= Patrick Huskinson =

British World War I flying ace (1897–1966)

- Born: 17 March 1897; Farndon, Nottinghamshire, England
- Died: 24 November 1966 (aged 69); London, England
- Military career
- Allegiance: United Kingdom
- Branch: Royal Air Force
- Rank: Air Commodore
- Units: No. 2 Squadron RFC; No. 19 Squadron RAF
- Commands: RAF Leconfield; RAF North Coates Fittes; No. 41 Squadron RAF; No. 70 Squadron RAF; No. 204 Squadron RAF
- Conflicts: First World War; Second World War
- Awards: Commander of the Order of British Empire; Military Cross & Bar; Officer of the Legion of Merit (United States)

Air Commodore Patrick Huskinson, CBE, MC & Bar (17 March 1897 – 24 November 1966) was an officer of the Royal Air Force (RAF), who served during the First and Second World Wars. He began his military career in the Royal Flying Corps as a fighter ace, but later switched to bombers. He became well enough versed in armaments that he was appointed Director of Armament Production by Winston Churchill at the start of the Second World War. After being invalided out of the RAF for blindness, he continued to serve as President of the Air Armaments Board and was responsible for designing ever larger bombs for the bombardment of Germany. Eventually, he designed Blockbuster bombs as large as ten tons.

== Early life ==
Patrick Huskinson was born the son of Colonel C. J. Huskinson, who commanded the local Territorial Army Regiment. The younger Huskinson attended Harrow School before entering the Royal Military College, Sandhurst, as a Gentleman Cadet. Upon graduation, he was commissioned into the Sherwood Foresters.

== First World War ==
After his commissioning as a second lieutenant on 20 October 1915, Huskinson was seconded from the Sherwood Foresters to aviation training, which included a Ground Gunnery School. Upon completion of training, he was appointed Flying Officer in the Royal Flying Corps on 21 March 1916. The following month, he began piloting a Royal Aircraft Factory B.E.2c for No. 2 Squadron. Shortly thereafter, he won the Military Cross for his determined prosecution of a hazardous bombing mission during the Battle of the Somme; it was gazetted on 27 July 1916. On 19 December 1916, he was appointed a Flight Commander and promoted to temporary captain.

On 1 January 1917, Huskinson was promoted to lieutenant. In early 1917, he was withdrawn from combat duty to attend the School of Special Flying at Gosport. He returned to the Western Front as a Spad VII pilot in 19 Squadron. Beginning on 24 October 1917, and running until 29 December, he ran off a string of seven aerial victories. He then upgraded to a Sopwith Dolphin, and ran off four more wins between 8 and 17 March 1918. The end result was three German planes destroyed and eight driven down out of control.

On 1 April 1918, coincident with the establishment of the Royal Air Force (RAF), Huskinson was confirmed as captain. Once again, he was withdrawn from battle; on 7 May 1918, he became an instructor at the Central Flying School. The new post carried with it the grade of major. He served out the rest of the war in this assignment, being variously an acting or a temporary major.

== Interbellum ==
Huskinson had a couple of short-lived squadron commands beginning 10 December 1918 and extending about a year. On 1 August 1919, he resigned his commission in the Sherwood Foresters and received a permanent commission as a captain in the RAF. His service as a flight lieutenant bore the same date.

On 10 March 1921, Huskinson married Ada Marie Dennehy; they honeymooned in the South of France.

After some inconsequential assignments, Huskinson attended Armament and Gunnery School beginning 23 February 1923. On 19 May 1924, he took up duties as armament officer, HQ 10 Group; on 20 October 1924, he moved to the same job for Coastal Area. On 1 January 1925, he was promoted to squadron leader. Later in 1925, on 21 September, he began a four-and-a-half-year stint on the staff of the Directorate of Training; he was responsible for setting up firing and bombing ranges.

After a stint as officer commanding, No. 41 Squadron RAF, Huskinson went on foreign assignment on 24 October 1931, on the Armament Staff at HQ Iraq Command. On 1 January 1933, he received another promotion, to wing commander.

Upon his return to Britain, Huskinson held a couple of armament officer positions beginning 1 April 1933, followed by command of a couple of air stations. On 1 July 1937, he was raised to group captain. On 14 March 1938, he became the RAF representative on the Ordnance Committee.

== Second World War ==
In early 1940, Huskinson was appointed as Director of Armament Production by Winston Churchill. In 1940, he also married Molly, his second wife. On 20 September 1940, he was brevetted a Temporary Air Commodore.

On 15 April 1941, Huskinson was blinded by the blast of a German bomb dropped during The Blitz. As a result, he was invalided out of the RAF on 25 January 1942. However, his expertise and talents were still needed; he was instantly appointed as President of the Air Armaments Board with two personal assistants and a secretary in an office in his home as a sop to his disability. Huskinson himself adapted to his blindness, using a Braille-like method of reading blueprints and drawings. As the war progressed, Huskinson was responsible for production of ever bigger bombs, all the way up to 12,000 and 22,000 pounds. These larger bombs size made transporting them to the airfield difficult. Huskinson designed the large bombs to be transportable in sections and easily assembled just before being loaded into the bomb bay. He also developed rockets, and improved gun turrets on bombers. He also arranged full-scale rehearsals for D-Day. He continued in this post through 1945.

== After the war ==
With the end of the war, Huskinson became Chairman of a London printing firm. On 9 October 1945, the United States, which had also used his blockbusters to bomb Germany, awarded him the Legion of Merit. He also received the Order of the British Empire from his own government. He wrote an account of his Second World War experiences in Vision Ahead, published in 1949.

Patrick Huskinson died at his home in Knightsbridge on 24 November 1966.

== Honours and awards ==
Military Cross (MC)

2nd Lt. Patrick Huskinson, Notts. and Derby. R. and R.F.C.

For conspicuous gallantry and skill. When attacking the enemy's communications, alone and without an observer, he descended to 800 feet in order to release his bombs on a train and station. He was under continuous fire and his engine and machine were seriously damaged, but he succeeded in flying back at a low altitude and safely landing within our lines. He was again heavily fired at as he crossed the lines.

Bar to Military Cross (MC)

Lt. (T./Capt.) Patrick Huskinson, M.C., Notts. and Derby. R., and R.F.C.

For conspicuous gallantry and devotion to duty.

== Bibliography ==
- Shores, Christopher F.; Franks, Norman & Guest, Russell F. (1990). Above the Trenches: a Complete Record of the Fighter Aces and Units of the British Empire Air Forces 1915–1920. London, UK: Grub Street. ISBN 978-0-948817-19-9.
