= Hilary Hood =

- Born: 13 May 1908; Paddington, London
- Died: 5 September 1940 (aged 32)
- Military career
- Allegiance: United Kingdom
- Branch: Royal Air Force
- Service years: 1927–1940
- Rank: Squadron leader
- Nickname: Robin
- Commands: No. 41 Squadron RAF
- Conflicts: World War II: Battle of Britain
- Awards: Distinguished Flying Cross

Squadron Leader Hilary Richard Lionel "Robin" Hood, DFC (13 May 1908 – 5 September 1940) was a Royal Air Force fighter pilot of the Second World War, who was killed during the Battle of Britain.

== Early life ==
Hilary Richard Lionel Hood was born on 13 May 1908, the younger son of John Lionel Bridport Hood, a theatrical manager and retired Royal Navy lieutenant, and Helene Margaret Hood (née Lessels).

Hood was educated at Oxted Preparatory School. While at this school, his father committed suicide. His mother remarried and moved to South Africa, while Hood was left in the guardianship of Henry Sykes JP. He continued his education at Tonbridge School.

== Royal Air Force ==
In September 1927 Hood was accepted as a cadet at the RAF College Cranwell. At Cranwell he rowed and played hockey for the college, the latter alongside fellow cadet Douglas Bader. He graduated from Cranwell on 28 July 1929.

Hood was posted to No. 23 Squadron RAF at RAF Kenley on 1 September 1929. He went to the Gunnery School at RAF Eastchurch for a month course after joining the squadron and remained part of No. 23 Squadron until May 1931. He was then posted to RAF Leuchars, before service with naval aviation training with HMS Courageous at Gosport. Hood was then posted to No. 23 Squadron, then serving in China, Shanghai and the Philippines with HMS Hermes, until 1933 when he returned to the United Kingdom and RAF Leuchars.

In late 1935 Hood served with No. 11 Flying Training School, RAF Wittering before returning to No. 23 Squadron at RAF Biggin Hill. Flying instructor duties followed with No. 5 Flying Training School at RAF Sealand and as chief flying instructor at No. 10 Squadron RAF at RAF Ternhill until February 1940.

In April 1940 Hood assumed command of No. 41 Squadron RAF flying Spitfires. Based initially at RAF Catterick and then RAF Hornchurch, Hood commanded the squadron through the early phases of the Battle of Britain. At 32 years of age, Hood was one of the oldest pilots to take part in the battle.

Reportedly during the Dunkirk evacuation, Hood caused a German bomber to crash in the sea, but does not appear to have made any claim. On 19 July he claimed both a Bf 109 destroyed, and a Ju 87 of LG 2.

=== Battle of Britain ===
On the afternoon of 5 September 1940, Hood led 12 Spitfires of No. 41 Squadron RAF from RAF Hornchurch with orders to patrol over Maidstone at 15,000 ft. As the squadron climbed, a large enemy bomber formation was met over the Thames Estuary. Hood took the squadron in line-astern formation and attacked the Do 17 bombers head-on. It is believed that while attacking, No. 41 Squadron were bounced by Bf 109s of JG 54.

Four Spitfires of No. 41 Squadron failed to return: Flight Lieutenant "Terry" Webster was killed in action, and Squadron Leader Hood was officially recorded as missing in action on 5 September 1940. His Spitfire was P9428, coded "EB – R".

The exact cause of Hood's demise remains unconfirmed, although one of the five combat claims made by JG 54 probably relate to this casualty. Hood was reported to have baled out, but his parachute became entangled with his aircraft with fatal consequences. Spitfire P9428 then crashed, engine-less and minus its port wing, near Nevendon. There is speculation that Hood was buried in a German war grave by mistake.

Hood was awarded the Distinguished Flying Cross, the award being gazetted after his death.

Hood is remembered on the Runnymede Memorial.
