= George Bennions =

RAF officer (1913–2004)

George Herman Bennions
- Born: 15 March 1913; Burslem, Stoke-on-Trent, Staffordshire
- Died: 30 January 2004 (aged 90)
- Military career
- Allegiance: United Kingdom
- Branch: Royal Air Force
- Service years: 1929–1946
- Rank: Squadron leader
- Nickname: Ben
- Unit: No. 41 Squadron RAF
- Conflicts: World War II: Battle of Britain
- Awards: Distinguished Flying Cross; Mentioned in Despatches
- Other work: Teacher (Woodwork, Metalwork & practical drawing)

George Herman Bennions, DFC (15 March 1913 – 30 January 2004), nicknamed "Ben", was a British flying ace who served with the Royal Air Force (RAF) during the Second World War. He was credited with having shot down at least twelve aircraft.

== Early life ==
George Bennions was born on 15 March 1913 in Burslem, Stoke-on-Trent, Staffordshire. His parents, Edward and Mary Bennions, both worked in the pottery industry. He joined the Royal Air Force in 1929 as an aircraft apprentice at RAF Halton and qualified three years later as an engine fitter. In 1935 Bennions married Avis Brown who died in 2000 and they had three daughters. Their son died in infancy.

Bennions trained as a pilot and in January 1936 joined No. 41 Squadron RAF in Aden as a sergeant pilot flying the Hawker Demon fighter. The squadron returned to England later that year to be re-equipped with the Hawker Fury, and again in 1940 with the Supermarine Spitfire. Bennions received his commission in April 1940.

== Wartime career ==
While stationed at RAF Hornchurch, he recorded his first success on 28 July 1940 when he shot down a Messerschmitt Bf 109 of JG 51. On the following day, after shooting down his second Bf 109, his Spitfire was damaged and he had to crash land in Kent. On 15 August 1940 while on a temporary rest break at RAF Catterick, his squadron was in action against a Luftwaffe force of 120 bombers and 21 Messerschmitt Bf 110 fighters along the Yorkshire coast near Hartlepool. Bennions destroyed one Messerschmitt Bf 110 of I./ZG 76 and damaged another. The squadron returned to Hornchurch and on 5 September Bennions shot down a Junkers Ju 88 and probably destroyed a Bf 109, and the following day two more Bf 109's. He claimed another Bf 109 on 9 September and further successes quickly followed bringing his tally to twelve destroyed (one German bomber, 11 fighters), five probably destroyed, and five damaged, including a Dornier Do 17. On 23 September 1940 he is credited by one source for shooting down Hans-Joachim Marseille over the English Channel. Marseille survived, and would go on to achieve 158 victories to rank as the most successful German ace against the Western Allies.

Bennions was severely wounded on 1 October 1940. That morning Bennions was about to go on leave but was scrambled (in Spitfire I X4559) to intercept Messerschmitts. He shot down one of the raiders before a shell exploded in his cockpit, blinding him in the left eye and severely damaging his right arm and leg. Badly burned and bleeding heavily he struggled to bail out, and somehow managed to open his parachute before losing consciousness. He was found in a field near Hatfield, and taken to hospital where swift action saved his right eye, but nothing could be done for the left. Bennions was transferred to Queen Victoria Hospital, East Grinstead, where he was one of the first pilots in the care of Sir Archibald McIndoe, the pioneer of plastic surgery for the treatment for severe burns. As one of "Archie's Guinea Pigs", Bennions became a founder member of the Guinea Pig Club. Also, as one who had parachuted to save his life, he was eligible to join the Caterpillar Club.

The day of his wounding, an award of the Distinguished Flying Cross (DFC) for Bennions was gazetted; the citation, published in The London Gazette, read:

Pilot Officer Bennions has led his section with great distinction. He has destroyed seven enemy aircraft and possibly several others. His determination and coolness have had a splendid influence on his squadron as a whole.

— London Gazette, No. 34958, 1 October 1940

Following remarkable recovery from his injuries, Bennions became a fighter controller and was promoted to squadron leader. In January 1943 he was mentioned in dispatches. He later served in North Africa as a senior controller and liaison officer with an American Fighter Group equipped with Spitfires. With only a limited flying category he was permitted to fly on convoy patrols; but was not allowed to take part in combat operations.

In October 1943, Bennions commanded a Ground control interception unit that was sent ashore at Ajaccio on Corsica. As he left the landing craft, an enemy glide bomb exploded, and he received shrapnel wounds. For the second time he became a patient of McIndoe at East Grinstead. For the rest of the war, Bennions was a senior fighter controller at various units in the North of England.

== Post-war ==
Bennions left the RAF in 1946, and took a teacher training course, returning to teach woodwork, metalwork and practical drawing at Catterick where he lived for the rest of his life. Bennions was a skilled silversmith, and had his own hallmark. His hobbies included building and sailing a dinghy with friends and also flying until his seventies a de Havilland Tiger Moth aircraft in which he owned a share. For many years he was an honorary member of the RAF Catterick Officers' Mess, where his invariably pleasant and unassuming manner seldom gave the younger serving members any inkling of his previous life. He was a keen golfer, and was elected captain of his local club before being made an honorary life member.

He died on 30 January 2004 and was buried at St Anne's Church in Catterick. The pallbearers at his funeral were flight crew from the nearby RAF station at Leeming. A thoroughfare in Catterick is named for him.
