= No. 41 Squadron RAF =

Flying squadron of the Royal Air Force

No. XLI Squadron RAF
- Squadron badge
- Active: 1916–1916; 1916–1918 (RFC); 1918–1919; 1923–1963; 1965–1970; 1972–present
- Country: United Kingdom
- Branch: Royal Air Force
- Type: Flying squadron
- Role: Test and evaluation
- Part of: No. 1 Group; Air and Space Warfare Centre
- Station: RAF Coningsby
- Mottos: Seek and destroy
- Aircraft: Eurofighter Typhoon FGR4
- Website: Official website

Commanders
- Notable commanders: Raymond Collishaw (Oct 1923 – Apr 1924); Raymond Hesselyn (Mar – Apr 1951); Christopher Harper (Oct 1994 – Jan 1997)

Insignia
- Tail badge

- Post 1950 roundel
- Tail codes: PN (Jan 1939–Sep 1939); E (Sep 1939 – Feb 1951); FA–FZ (Jaguars); EB-A–EB-Z (2010–present)

No. 41 Squadron Royal Air Force is a flying squadron of the Royal Air Force (RAF), currently operating as the Test and Evaluation Squadron (TES) for the RAF's Typhoon, presently based at RAF Coningsby in the English county of Lincolnshire in the United Kingdom. Its current official abbreviated title is 41 TES. The squadron was originally formed in April 1916; 110 years ago, during First World War as part of the Royal Flying Corps (RFC), and served on the Western Front as a ground attack and fighter squadron. Disbanded in 1919 as part of the post-war draw down, No. 41 Squadron was re-formed as an RAF squadron in 1923, and remained on home service until 1935, when it was deployed to Aden during the Abyssinian crisis.

During the Second World War, the squadron flew Supermarine Spitfire fighters, and saw action over Dunkirk and the during the Battle of Britain in the early years of the war. Combat operations were flown from Britain over German-occupied Europe during 1941–1944, before the squadron moved to the continent after the Normandy landings. During 1944–1945, the squadron supported the Allied advance into Germany, and it remained there until mid-1946 as part of the occupation force following the end of hostilities. In the post-war years, the squadron was disbanded and re-formed several times, operating a variety of jet aircraft in the fighter, reconnaissance, and interceptor roles. In 2006, the squadron was re-roled as the Fast Jet & Weapons Operational Evaluation Unit. It remained in this role until 2010, when it became the Test and Evaluation Squadron of the Royal Air Force.

== History ==
=== First World War (1916–1919) ===
No. 41 Squadron Royal Flying Corps (RFC) was formed at Fort Rowner, Gosport, in early April 1916, with a nucleus of men from No. 28 Squadron RFC. However, on 22 May 1916, the squadron was disbanded again when it was re-numbered 'No. 27 Reserve Squadron RFC'.

No. 41 Squadron was re-formed on 14 July 1916 with a nucleus of men from No. 27 Reserve Squadron, and equipped with the Vickers F.B.5 Gun Bus and Airco D.H.2 Scout. These were replaced in early September 1916 with the Royal Aircraft Factory F.E.8, and it was these aircraft which the squadron took on their deployment to France on 15 October 1916. Eighteen aircraft departed Gosport for the 225 miles (362 kilometres) flight to Saint-Omer, but only twelve actually made it, the others landing elsewhere with technical problems. The twelve pilots spent a week at Saint-Omer before moving to Abeele, where the ground crews reached them by road, and the remaining six pilots by rail, minus their aircraft.

The F.E.8 was already obsolete as a pure fighter, and the squadron used theirs mainly for ground attack. On 24 January 1917, the squadron claimed its first victories. These fell to Sergeant Pilot Cecil Tooms, who himself was killed in action only four hours later. While equipped with the F.E.8, the squadron participated in the Battle of Arras (April–May 1917) and the Battle of Messines (June 1917). By this time, the unit had become the last 'pusher' fighter squadron in the RFC. In July 1917, the squadron was re-equipped with the Airco DH.5 fighter, which proved disappointing; in October 1917, the squadron finally received the Royal Aircraft Factory S.E.5a fighter, with which they were equipped for the duration of the war.

The squadron provided distinguished service in the Battle of Cambrai (November 1917), and subsequently in the German spring offensive (March 1918), and the Battle of Amiens (August 1918). The squadron claimed its final victory of the war two days prior to the cessation of hostilities. In the aftermath, the unit was reduced to a cadre of just sixteen men on 7 February 1919, and returned to the United Kingdom. Their new base was RAF Tangmere, West Sussex, but they were moved to RAF Croydon, Surrey, in early October, and formally disbanded on 31 December 1919.

The squadron's pilots and ground crews were awarded four Distinguished Service Orders, six Military Crosses, nine Distinguished Flying Crosses, two Military Medals, and four Mentions in Dispatches. The pilots were credited with destroying 111 aircraft and 14 balloons, sending down 112 aircraft out of control, and driving down 25 aircraft and five balloons. Thirty-nine men were killed or died on active service, 48 were wounded or injured, and 20 pilots became prisoners of war, including Australian Captain Norman Bruce Hair.

=== Interwar period (1923–1938) ===
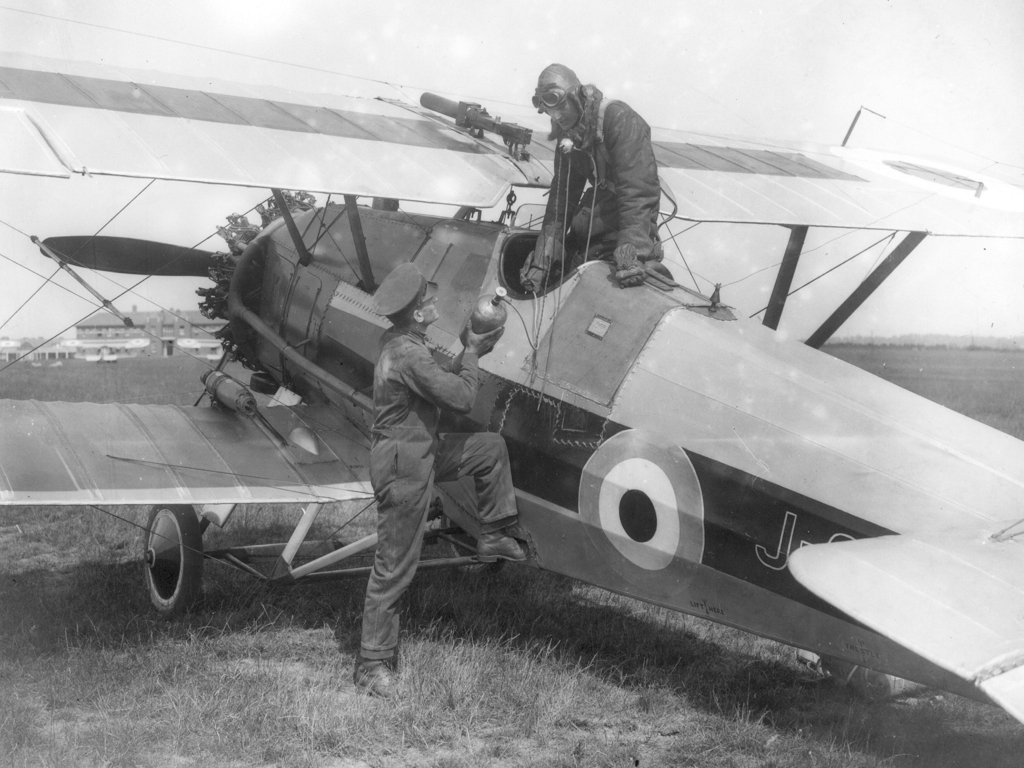
An Armstrong-Whitworth Siskin IIIa of No. 41 Squadron being serviced with oxygen at RAF Northolt during the 1920s

No. 41 Squadron reformed at RAF Northolt, Greater London, on 1 April 1923, equipped with the Sopwith Snipe. In 1924, it began receiving the first Armstrong Whitworth Siskin III biplanes. On 27 July 1929, eleven aircraft from the squadron flew to Calais to rendezvous with French aviation pioneer Louis Blériot and escort him back to Dover, in a re-enactment of the first crossing of the English Channel twenty years earlier. On 9 October 1930, following the R101 airship disaster in Beauvais, France, No. 41 Squadron pilots and ground crew formed a part of the Guard of Honour for the Lying-in-State of the forty-eight victims in the Palace of Westminster. Amongst the dead were the Secretary of State for Air, Brigadier General Lord Christopher Thomson, and the Director of Civil Aviation, Air Vice-Marshal Sir Sefton Brancker. Thousands filed past to pay their last respects.

During the 1930s, displays, sports, competitions, tactical exercises, and flying practice were a part of regular activity. In the summer of 1934, the squadron even performed a flying display for South Bucks Mothers' Union. On 1 July 1935, the squadron escorted an Imperial Airways aircraft to Brussels, with the Duke and Duchess of York on board, where they attend functions for British Week at the International Exhibition. During this period, No. 41 Squadron was also visited by a number of British and foreign government and military dignitaries. One of the first was Japanese General Matsui Iwane who, after the Second World War, was held accountable and executed for the 1937 'Rape of Nanjing', in which his armies murdered an estimated 300,000 Chinese civilians. British dignitaries included Prime Minister, Ramsay MacDonald; the Chief of Air Services, Marshal of the RAF Hugh Trenchard; the Air Officer Commanding in Chief Air Defence of Great Britain, Air Marshal Sir Edward Ellington; and the Air Officer Commanding Fighting Area, Air Defence of Great Britain, Air Vice-Marshal Hugh Dowding.

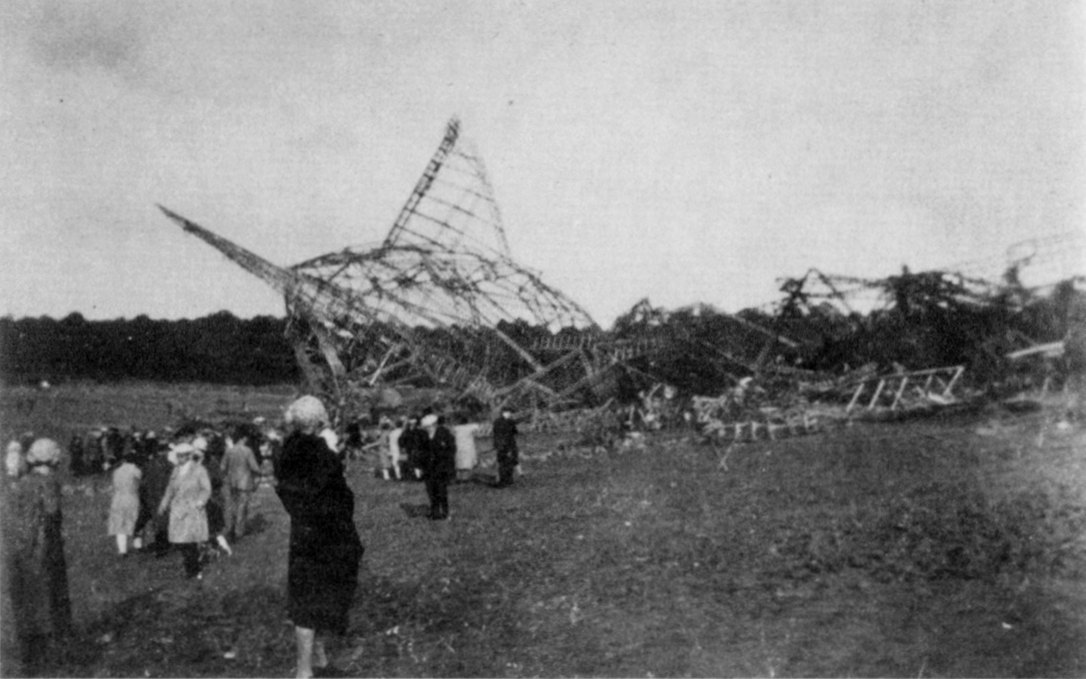
R101 disaster: 41 Squadron pilots and ground crew formed a part of the Guard of Honour for the Lying-in-State of the 48 victims in the Palace of Westminster on 9 October 1930.

In October 1935, the squadron was sent to the Aden Province with No. 12 Squadron and No. 203 Squadron, to help provide a deterrent to Italy in the region during the Abyssinian crisis of 1935–36, and to protect Aden in case of an airborne or seaborne attack by Italian forces. Although No. 41 Squadron visited British Somaliland once, which bordered Abyssinia, the unit was otherwise not involved in the crisis, and spent much of their time in flying training and periodic mail runs to Perim Island and Kamaran Island. On occasion, they assisted the resident unit, No. 8 Squadron, with air policing duties, and returned to the United Kingdom in August 1936. They were then based at RAF Catterick, Yorkshire, from September 1936, where they remained until May 1940.

On 30 December 1938, No. 41 Squadron was issued with the Supermarine Spitfire, becoming the third RAF squadron to receive them. By early February 1939, the squadron had received a full complement of twenty Mk.I Spitfires, at the cost of £129,130.

Around 200 pilots served with No. 41 Squadron between 1 April 1923 and 2 September 1939. During this period, no battle honours were granted, nor any decorations awarded, but the era produced ten Air Commodores, nine Air Vice-Marshals, two Air Marshals, and two Air Chief Marshals. During these same years, eleven men were killed and three injured in flying accidents, and three injured in aircrew accidents on the ground.

=== Second World War (1939–1945) ===
Following the declaration of war on 3 September 1939, No. 41 Squadron spent the first several months on monotonous routine patrols in the north of England. At the end of May 1940, the squadron flew south to RAF Hornchurch in Essex to participate in the evacuation of Dunkirk. Twelve days later, they returned to RAF Catterick, claiming six Axis aircraft destroyed and one probable, but also left behind two pilots, the squadron's first pilot killed in action, and their first lost as a prisoner of war. After resting for a few weeks, the squadron headed south again on 26 July 1940, to participate in the first phase of the Battle of Britain. In its two-week tour, the squadron claimed ten Axis aircraft destroyed, four probables and three damaged, for the loss of one pilot killed and a second wounded.

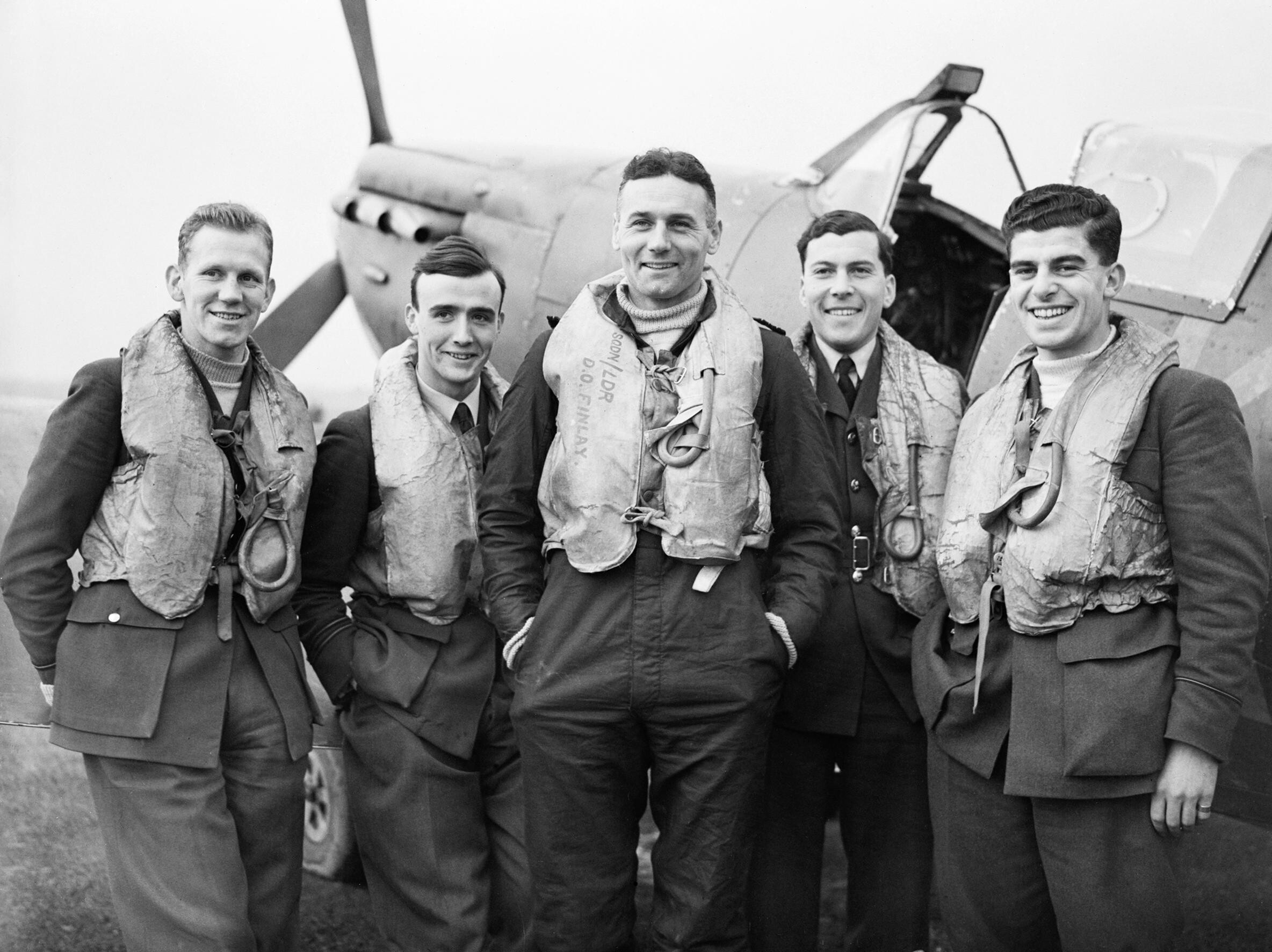
No. 41 Squadron personnel at RAF Hornchurch in late November 1940

Again, No. 41 Squadron returned north to Catterick for a few weeks rest, but returned to Hornchurch on 3 September 1940, where they remained until the end of February 1941. They were now in the thick of the Battle of Britain. The price was high, but so was the damage they inflicted on the Luftwaffe. On 5 September, the squadron experienced one of its blackest days. The commanding officer and officer commanding B Flight, were killed in action, and three other pilots were shot down and two were wounded in action; one of these was hospitalised for six months.

On 31 October 1940, the Battle of Britain was considered officially over. Forty-nine pilots flew with the squadron between 10 July and 31 October 1940. Of these, forty-two were British, two Canadian, two Irish, and two New Zealanders. Ten were killed and twelve wounded in action (44% casualties). The squadron claimed over a hundred victories from July 1940 to the end of that year.

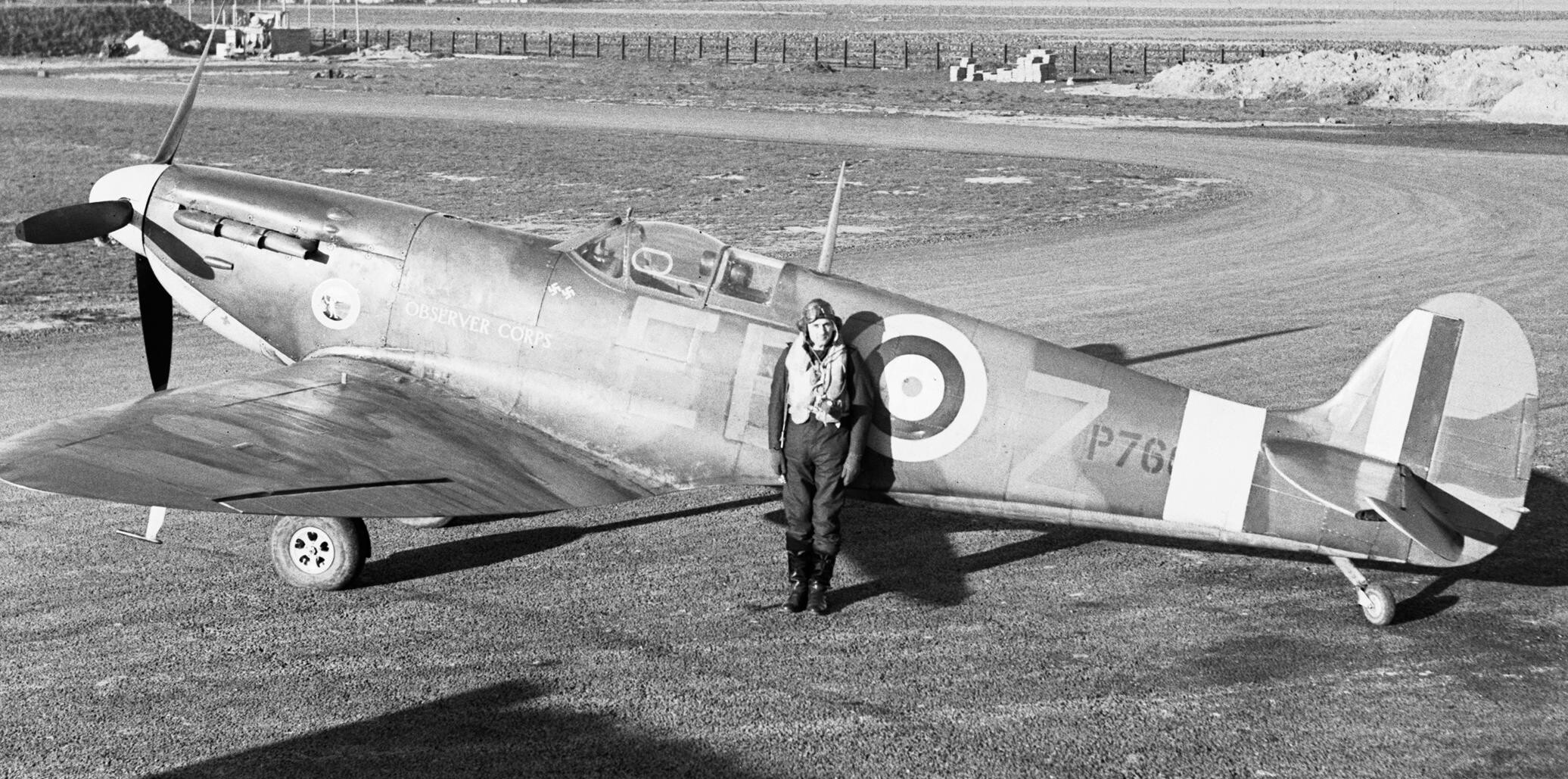
Squadron Leader Donald O. Finlay, officer commanding No. 41 Squadron in January 1941, standing with his Supermarine Spitfire Mk. IIa

On 23 February 1941, the squadron returned to Catterick for a well-earned break. Only four pilots remained from the original eighteen who landed in Hornchurch on 3 September 1940. However, in reality it is much worse: sixteen pilots had been killed, five wounded and hospitalised (who did not return) and fifteen otherwise posted away, in effect a 200% turnover since the unit's deployment to Hornchurch in early September. The squadron also now has its third commanding officer since then, and its fourth within ten months.

Following five months rest in Catterick, during which the last Battle of Britain hardened pilots departed and new recruits joined from the British Commonwealth Air Training Programme, the squadron headed south to RAF Merston, Sussex, on 28 July 1941, to join the Tangmere Wing, where the wing leader was Douglas Bader. There followed an intensive period of offensive activity over France.

On 12 February 1942, No. 41 Squadron took part in the attack on the German Kriegsmarine's Prinz Eugen, Scharnhorst, and Gneisenau after they escaped from Brest and made a dash up the Channel to the safety of their home ports. During these actions, No. 41 Squadron claimed three German aircraft destroyed and one damaged, but lost one pilot who failed to return.

The squadron also supported the ill-fated Canadian landings at Dieppe (Operation Jubilee) on 19 August 1942, completing three squadron-strength missions over the beaches. The pilots returned from the third without the Officer Commanding, Sqn Ldr Geoffrey Hyde, who was hit by flak and killed; he was the squadron's only casualty that day.

Tired, after a busy summer on the south coast fending off Messerschmitt Bf 109s and Focke-Wulf Fw 190s fulfilling the Luftwaffe's 'hit and run' strategy, the squadron was taken off operations until February 1943 and sent to RAF Llanbedr, Wales, for an extended period of rest. This heralded the start of an intensive period of turnover in the unit's ranks, as men were rested and fresh pilots brought in.

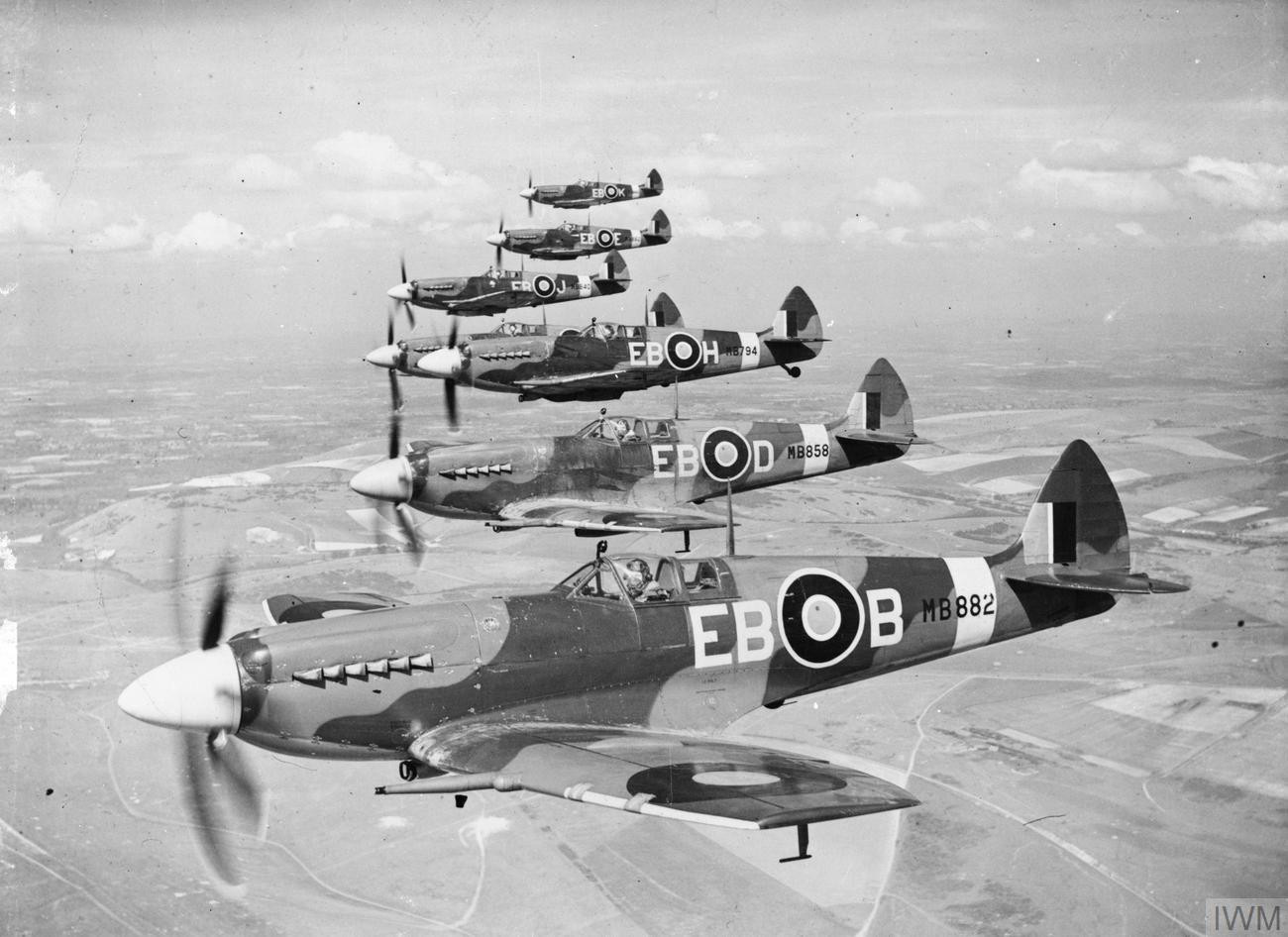
Seven Supermarine Spitfire Mk.XII of No. 41 Squadron on 12 April 1944

In February 1943, the unit became the first of only two squadrons to receive the new Griffon-engine Spitfire Mk.XII. Having rested, re-equipped and trained on the new aircraft, the squadron was sent back onto operations in April 1943, and claimed their first definitive victory in over ten months on 17 April. This was also the first by the RAF in the Mk.XII Spitfire.

From late June 1943, large scale bomber escorts to targets in France, Belgium, and the Netherlands, became a daily event, and Ramrod escorts to formations of between 50 and 150 Boeing Flying Fortresses and Martin B-26 Marauders became routine.

No. 41 Squadron provided air support in the lead-up to, and throughout the D-Day landings. On D-Day itself, 6 June 1944, three pilots were hit by flak over the bridgehead and one was killed. On 19 June, however, the squadron was pulled off air-support for the bridgehead in France, and was deployed solely in the destruction of Germany's newest weapon, the V-1 flying bomb. On 28 August 1944, the squadron claimed its last of fifty-three V-1s destroyed during the war. Several pilots succeeded in bringing them down after expending all their ammunition, by flying alongside them and placing their own wingtips underneath that of the V-1. The wind movement between both wingtips was sufficient to upset the V-1's gyroscope and send crashing it to the ground.

The squadron was re-equipped with the Spitfire Mk.XIV in September 1944, and during the ensuing three months, participated in 'Big Ben' operations against V-2 rocket launch sites, in Operation Market Garden at Arnhem and Nijmegen, in operations in the Walcheren campaign, and in the Allied Oil Campaign over Germany.

The squadron moved to the continent in early December 1944, making its base at Diest in Belgium. Ground targets were the squadron's chief prey as a member of No. 125 Expeditionary Wing, and the unit attacked anything moving on road, rail, or canal in Germany. Operating so close to the ground, flak also took its toll on pilots and aircraft. One pilot was killed, three wounded, and two shot down and taken prisoner.

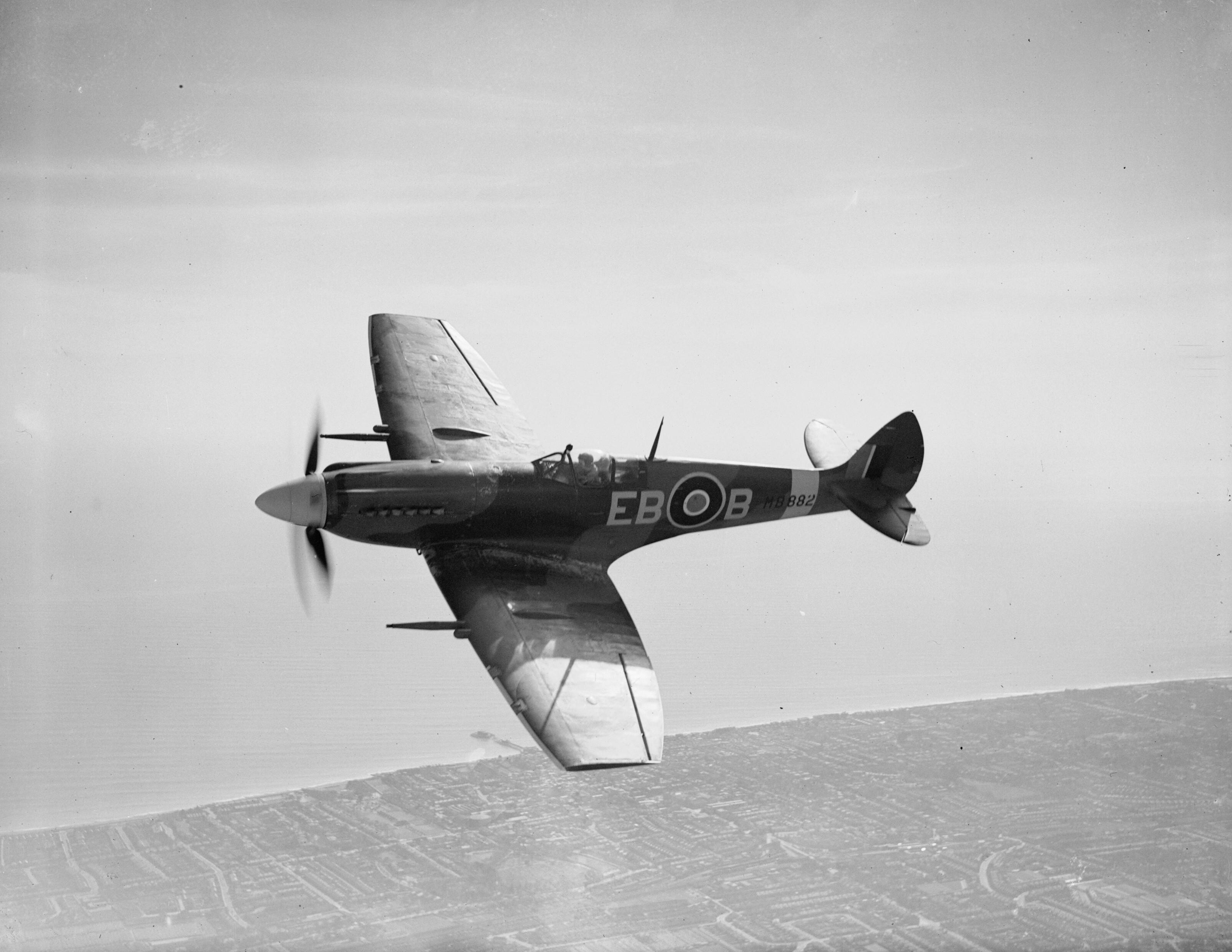
A No. 41 Squadron Supermarine Spitfire Mk.XII on 2 April 1944

In April 1945, the squadron moved forward with the advancing front, and made its first base in Germany, just south-west of the town of Celle, 140 miles (230 km) due west of Berlin, and only a short distance south-east of the Bergen-Belsen concentration camp. During April and early May 1945, German resistance crumbled. No. 41 Squadron claimed thirty-three enemy aircraft destroyed, two probably destroyed, and three damaged in the air, and twenty-one damaged on the ground, in the twenty-three days preceding 3 May 1945 (the date of the squadron's final claim). Their own casualties for the same period were no pilots killed or wounded in action, and no aircraft lost to enemy action, although some did sustain combat damage.

After the cessation of hostilities, the squadron was based a short time at Kastrup in the suburbs of Copenhagen, but returned to Germany, where it became a part of the Allied occupying forces, known as British Air Forces of Occupation. By the end of the war, No. 41 Squadron had claimed two-hundred aircraft destroyed, sixty-one probably destroyed, 109 damaged, and fifty-three V-1s destroyed. On 31 March 1946, still based on the continent, No. 41 Squadron was disbanded by re-numbering to No. 26 Squadron.

The squadron had two mascots during the war: 'Wimpy', a Bull Terrier with the tip of one ear missing, at RAF Catterick in 1939–40, and 'Perkin', a large black French Poodle, in 1943–44. The squadron's 325 Second World War pilots were men from Britain, Australia, Austria, Belgium, Canada, Czechoslovakia, France, the Republic of Ireland, the Netherlands, New Zealand, Norway, Palestine, Poland, White Russia, Rhodesia, South Africa, Trinidad, Uruguay, the United States, and Zululand.

No. 41 Squadron's pilots were awarded three Distinguished Service Orders, twenty-one Distinguished Flying Crosses, one Defence Medal, and one Mention in Dispatches, for their service during the Second World War with the unit. Sixty four were killed in action or died on active service, fifty-eight were wounded in action or injured in accidents, three were shot down but evaded capture and returned to the United Kingdom, and twenty-one pilots were shot down and became prisoners of war. The average age of a man who died in service with the squadron during the war was aged 23½.

=== Cold War (1946–1990s) ===
On 1 April 1946, only a day after being disbanded in Germany, No. 41 Squadron was re-formed at RAF Dalcross in Scotland as a fighter squadron, by re-numbering from No. 122 Squadron, and reverted to the Supermarine Spitfire, this time the Mk. F.21 variant.

The squadron flew its Spitfires for the last time on 18 August 1947, and became No. 41 Instrument Flying Rating Squadron, equipped with the Airspeed Oxford and North American Harvard. However, in June the following year, the squadron reverted to fighter defence and was re-equipped with the de Havilland Hornet F.1, followed later by the F.3 variant.

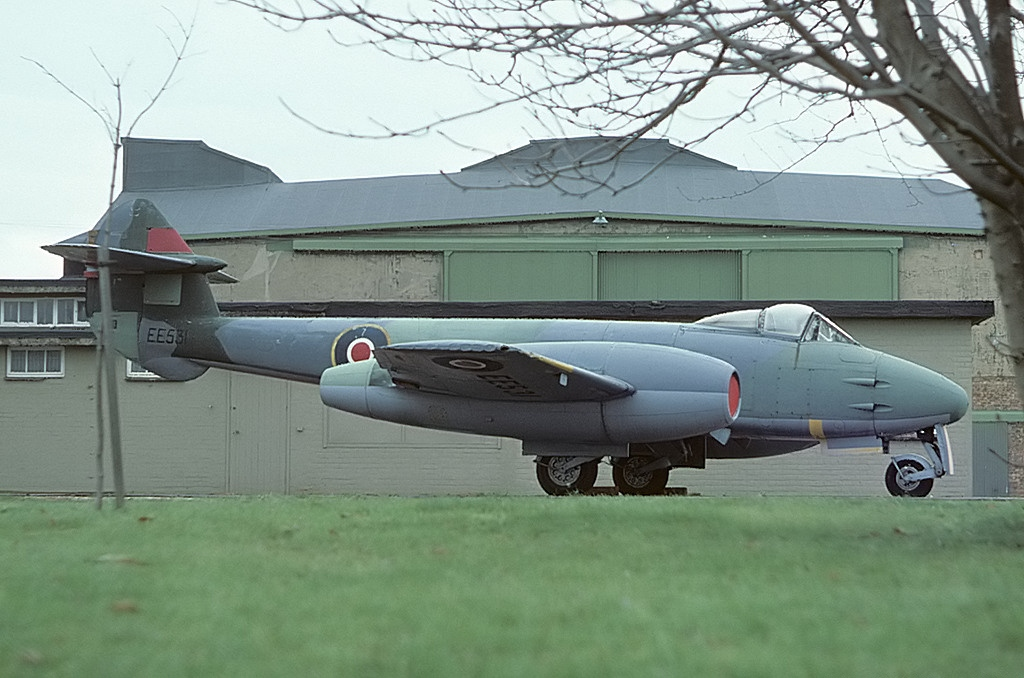
An RAF Gloster Meteor F.4 of the type operated by No. 41 Squadron during the 1950s

No. 41 Squadron became a day fighter unit again in January 1951 and entered the jet age, receiving its first jet-powered aircraft, the Gloster Meteor F.4 In April 1951 these were replaced by the Gloster Meteor F.8, and four years later the squadron received the Hawker Hunter F.5. On 14 July 1957, the squadron was presented with a standard displaying the unit's battle honours by the Chief of the Air Staff, Air Marshal Sir Theodore McEvoy, who had served three years with No. 41 Squadron as a young officer, following his graduation from RAF College, Cranwell in 1925.

However, no amount of nostalgia would save the unit from the government's budgetary axe. On 31 January 1958, as a part of a scheme to reduce the size of RAF Fighter Command, No. 41 Squadron fell to the same fate as No. 600 Squadron and No. 615 Squadron had before it, and was also disbanded. With the departure of No. 41 Squadron, its home station of RAF Biggin Hill ceased to be a Fighter Command airfield, its infrastructure deemed out-of-date for the requirements of modern warfare. The runways had become too short for the RAF's newest generation of aircraft and, as a result of encroaching development and civil air paths which now passed above, the base was no longer in a practical location. Fighter Command officially departed from the airfield on 1 March 1958. This gave No. 41 Squadron the curious distinction of being the last fighter squadron ever to be based at Biggin Hill. The departure of the unit marked the end of an era for the station, as thereafter it was relegated to non-operational status, and only used by the London University Air Squadron.

On 1 February 1958, just a day after being disbanded, No, 141 Squadron, based at RAF Coltishall, Norfolk, dropped the '1' at the beginning of its number and was thus reborn as No. 41 Squadron. In doing so, they automatically absorbed No. 141 Squadron's all-weather Gloster Javelin FAW.4 fighters and personnel.

No. 41 Squadron's standard, originally presented only six months previously, was handed over to No. 141 Squadron on 16 January 1958, just ahead of their renumbering, in a short ceremony attended by Air Officer Commanding-in-Chief, Fighter Command, Air Chief Marshal Sir Thomas Pike, and by No. 11 Group's Air Officer Commanding, Air Vice-Marshal Victor Bowling, himself a veteran No. 41 Squadron pilot from 1935.

Only remaining at Coltishall six months, the squadron moved to RAF Wattisham, Suffolk, on 5 July 1958, where the Gloster Javelins were replaced by FAW.8 variants in January 1960. By this time, No. 56 Squadron had also relocated to Wattisham. Whilst there, they hosted French Air Force Dassault Super Mystère fighters during French President Charles de Gaulle's state visit in April 1960. No. 41 Squadron remained at Wattisham for approximately five-and-a-half years, before the unit was disbanded again, on 31 December 1963.

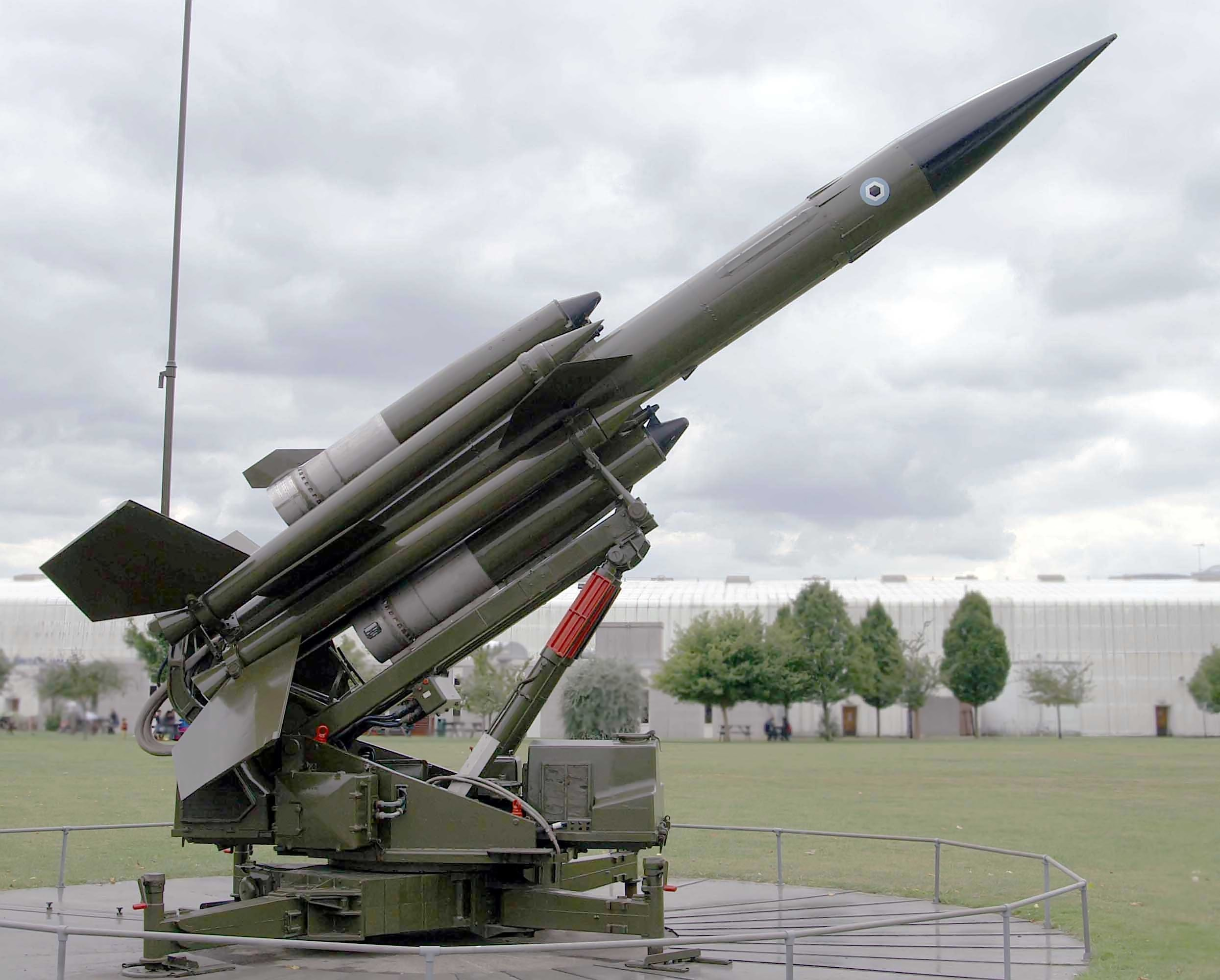
A Bristol Bloodhound surface-to-air missile, of the type operated by No. 41 Squadron from 1965 to 1970 at RAF West Raynham

On 1 September 1965, after a twenty-month break, No. 41 Squadron was re-formed at RAF West Raynham, Norfolk, but this time as a completely different structure. The unit remained firmly on the ground as a missile defence squadron, armed with Bloodhound Mk.II surface-to-air-missile (SAM). Changes to the SAM programme, however, saw No. 41 Squadron disbanded yet again just five years later, on 18 September 1970. The squadron standard was moved to the Church of St. Michael and St. George at RAF West Raynham, for safe-keeping.

==== Tactical reconnaissance ====
On 1 April 1972, at RAF Coningsby in Lincolnshire, the squadron was reborn as a tactical fighter reconnaissance and ground attack unit within No. 38 Group Air Support Command. To support them in their reconnaissance role, a 'Reconnaissance Intelligence Centre' or 'RIC' was formed. The RIC is composed of a number of Air Transportable Reconnaissance Exploitation Laboratories (ATREL), which enable the rapid developing of photographic images and their subsequent analysis. The ATRELs can be transported by air or road, and can be deployed with the squadron to forward operating bases.

In this role, they were equipped with the McDonnell Douglas F-4 Phantom FGR.2, but these were soon deemed to be unsuitable for the unit. Over the ensuing years, a strategic decision was made to change the role of the RAF's Phantoms from a fighter to an interceptor. This amendment, however, created consternation within some circles, as it was felt the squadron should maintain its role as a fighter and ground attack unit. Consequently, it was resolved to disband No. 41 Squadron and re-form it elsewhere to enable it to do so.

In preparation for this change, 'No. 41 Designate Squadron' was formed at RAF Coltishall, on 1 July 1976, and commenced training as a reconnaissance unit with SEPECAT Jaguar GR1 aircraft. The two squadrons operated independently of one another until 31 March 1977, when No. 41 Squadron was disbanded at Coningsby. This allowed the Coltishall-based No. 41 Designate Squadron to drop 'Designate' from their name, take possession of the standard, adopt the squadron badge, and become the new combat-ready No. 41 Squadron at RAF Coltishall a day later.

No. 41 Squadron's role changed to low-level reconnaissance and, in early 1978, it became part of NATO Supreme Allied Commander Europe Strategic Reserve. In 1980, the unit was assigned to the Allied Command Europe Mobile Force, and was subsequently involved in exercises at Bardufoss in Norway and Decimomannu in Sardinia.

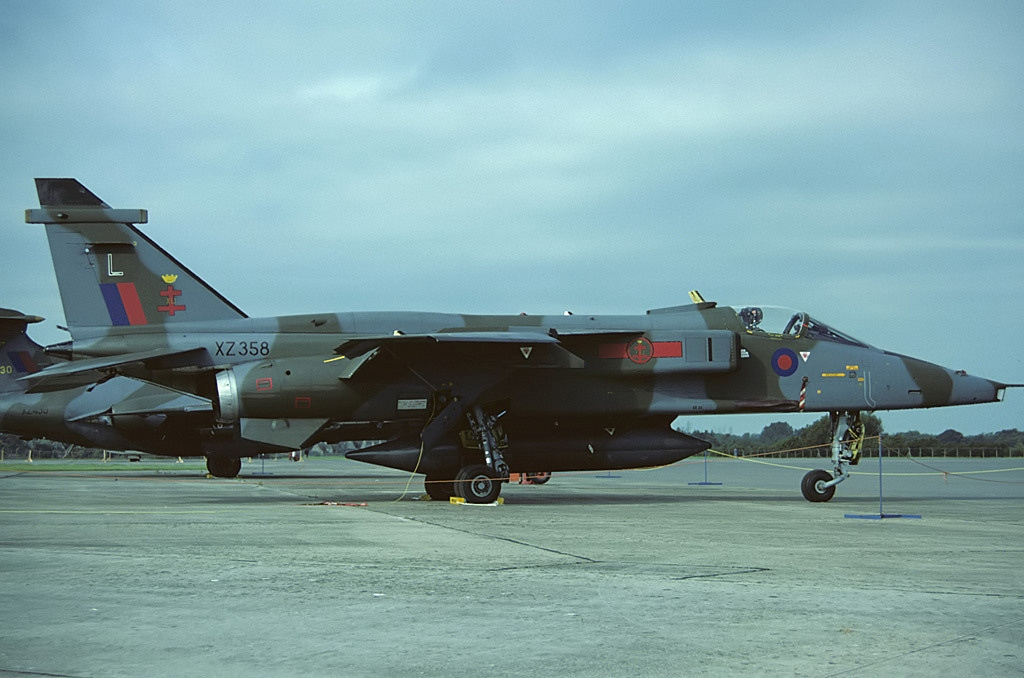
A SEPECAT Jaguar GR1 of No. 41 Squadron in 1982

In support of its reconnaissance role, the unit formed a RIC at Coltishall to process and interpret the photographs made by pilots, using sensors located in a large external pod. The photographic film was taken to the MAREL's (Mobile Aerial Reconnaissance Exploitation Laboratories) for processing and interpretation. Ideally, a mission report would have been generated within 45 minutes of 'engines off'. Smaller 'air-portable' RICs were also used during off-base deployments. As a result of this ability, the squadron has been involved in a number of conflicts over two decades during the 1990s and 2000s. In early 1991, during the Gulf War (Operation Granby) the squadron's Jaguar GR1 and GR1A aircraft flew a large number of reconnaissance and bombing missions against Iraqi forces as a part of the coalition forces.

In its aftermath, the squadron was deployed to Incirlik Air Base, in south-west Turkey, where it participated in the defence of Iraq's Kurdish minority within the boundaries of the country's northern no-fly zone (Operations 'Warden' and 'Resinate North') until April 1993. It was during this period that the large external photographic pods were replaced with smaller, more versatile, medium level pods.

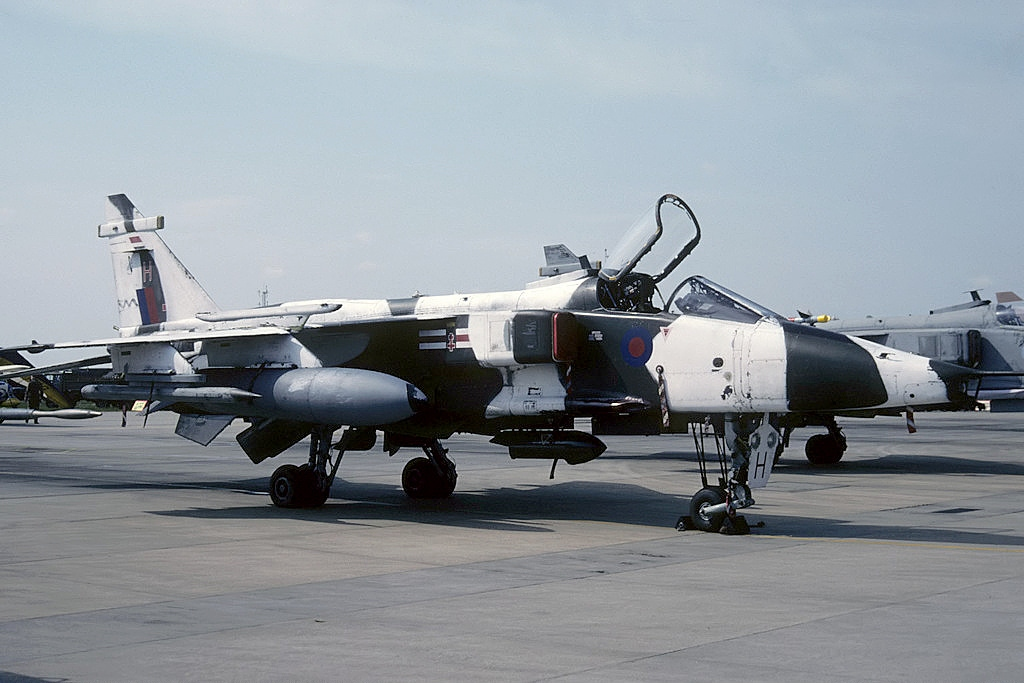
A No. 41 Squadron SEPECAT Jaguar GR1A wearing a snow camouflage paint scheme in 1996, applied for a NATO exercise in Bardufoss Air Station, Norway

Four months later, the squadron was deployed to southern Italy, where it flew policing duties over Bosnia in support of Operation Deny Flight until August 1995. It was during this time that one of the squadron's Jaguars became the first RAF aircraft to drop a bomb in anger over Europe since the end of the Second World War. The target was a Bosnian-Serb tank.

The squadron returned to Coltishall in August 1995. Despite the vital work they had performed in Iraq and Bosnia, the squadron found their photographic systems were inhibited by the use of photographic film, which required special handling and processing before any results could be viewed and analysed. This drawback was compounded by the inherent difficulties of moving hardcopy prints around the battlefield, particularly with the distances involved in modern warfare. To overcome these issues, the Jaguar Replacement Reconnaissance Pod (JRRP) was introduced in August 2000. The new system provided for the recording of a digital images by three cameras onto VHS-C super videotapes with electro optical sensors for day operations and infra-red sensors for night operations. Digital images were then analysed in the ATRELs through a Windows-based application, named 'Ground Imagery Exploitation System' (GIES). The GIES allowed image analysts to edit images and send them electronically.

=== 21st century (2000–present) ===
==== Withdrawal of Jaguar ====
This system was taken into battle on the Squadron's last operational deployment, during the Iraq War (Operation Telic) between March and April 2003. During the operation, they were based at Incirlik, once again, equipped with the more up-to-date Jaguar GR3.

In July 2004, the Defence Secretary announced that as a part of a re-organisation of the Defence Forces following a Government spending review, No. 41 Squadron would disband once again, on 31 March 2006. The defence white paper, Delivering Security in a Changing World: Future Capabilities, foresaw the retirement of the RAF's Jaguar aircraft two years early and the closure of RAF Coltishall. Advances in technology, it reasoned, would mean air defence could be maintained with fewer aircraft, thus allowing older equipment to be withdrawn from service earlier than originally intended. The authors planned that the RAF's future air combat force would be based around the multi-role Eurofighter Typhoon and Joint Combat Aircraft, in co-operation with the Panavia Tornado GR4 and British Aerospace Harrier GR7/GR9. Furthermore, the paper intended to reduce RAF trained manned strength from 48,500 to 41,000 by 1 April 2008.

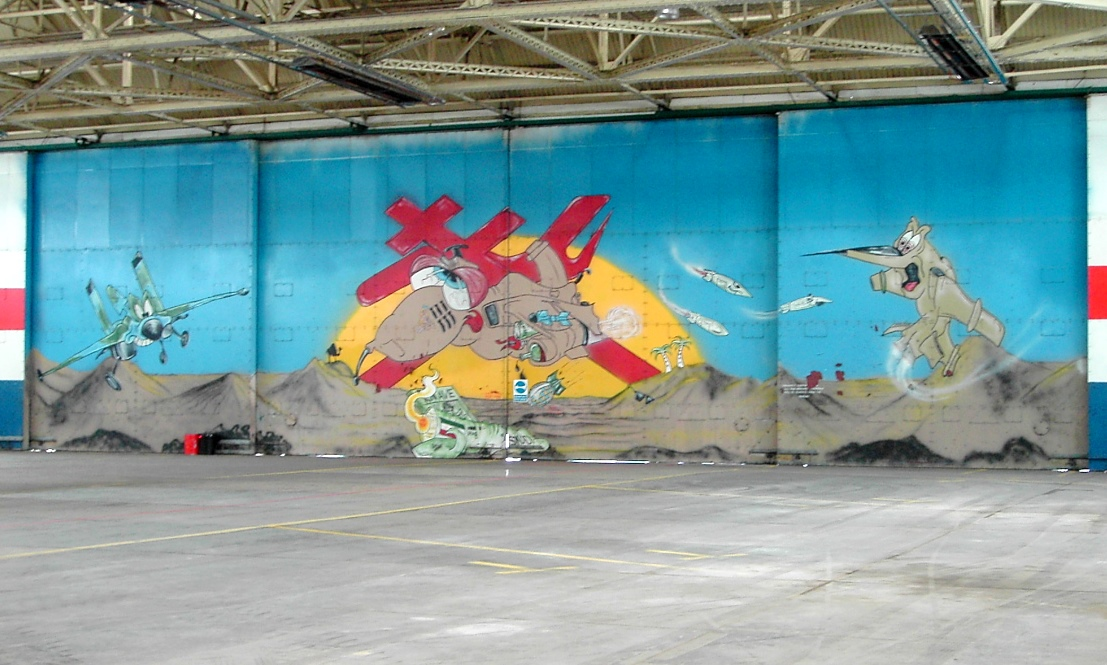
The interior of the doors on No. 41 Squadron's hangar at RAF Coltishall on 1 April 2006, the day the station was closed

As a result of these decisions, all of RAF Coltishall's squadrons would be directly affected. No. 16 (R) Squadron (the Jaguar operational conversion unit) and No. 54 (F) Squadron, would be disbanded by 1 April 2005 and their aircraft disposed of, and No. 41 Squadron by 1 April 2006. No. 6 Squadron, with the last of the RAF's Jaguars, would be moved to RAF Coningsby on 1 April 2006, itself disbanded by 31 October 2007. RAF Coltishall itself would be finally closed in December 2006, thus ending an over 66-year history.

The first of these draw-downs took place on 11 March 2005, when No. 16 Squadron and No. 54 Squadron held a combined passing-out parade. However, their disbandment had little immediate effect on the activity at Coltishall, as most Jaguar airframes and personnel were absorbed into No. 6 Squadron and No. 41 Squadron. However, with the departure of these latter squadrons in 2006, and the subsequent closure of the station in December, the close-knit RAF community was dispersed to other locations, and a quiet returned to the area, which has not existed since May 1940.

The following senior leaders of the RAF all served with No. 41 Squadron at some time in their career during the Jaguar period: Sir Stephen Dalton, Sir Richard Garwood, Sir Chris Harper, Sir Jock Stirrup, Sir Charles John Thomson, and Sir Glenn Torpy.

However, despite the Government's intention to disband No. 41 Squadron, and plans drawn up for final ceremonies to take place on the first weekend in April 2006, the unit was given a new lease on life only a short while before taking effect. Approval was received to move No. 41 Squadron to Coningsby with No. 6 Squadron on 1 April 2006, and to assume the role of the Fast Jet and Weapons Operational Evaluation Unit.

==== Fast Jet & Weapons Operational Evaluation Unit ====
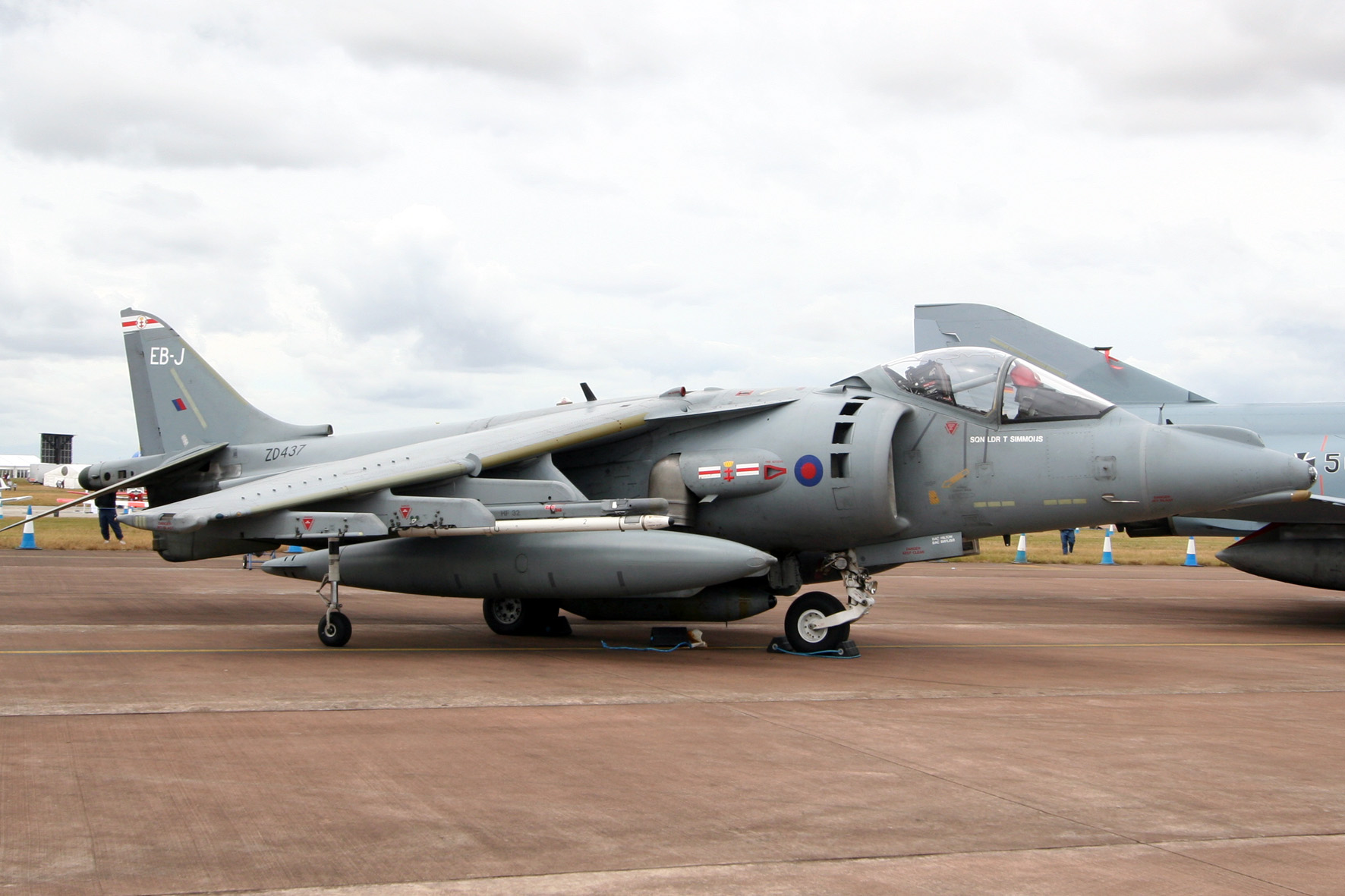
A BAe Harrier GR9 of No. 41 Squadron in 2010

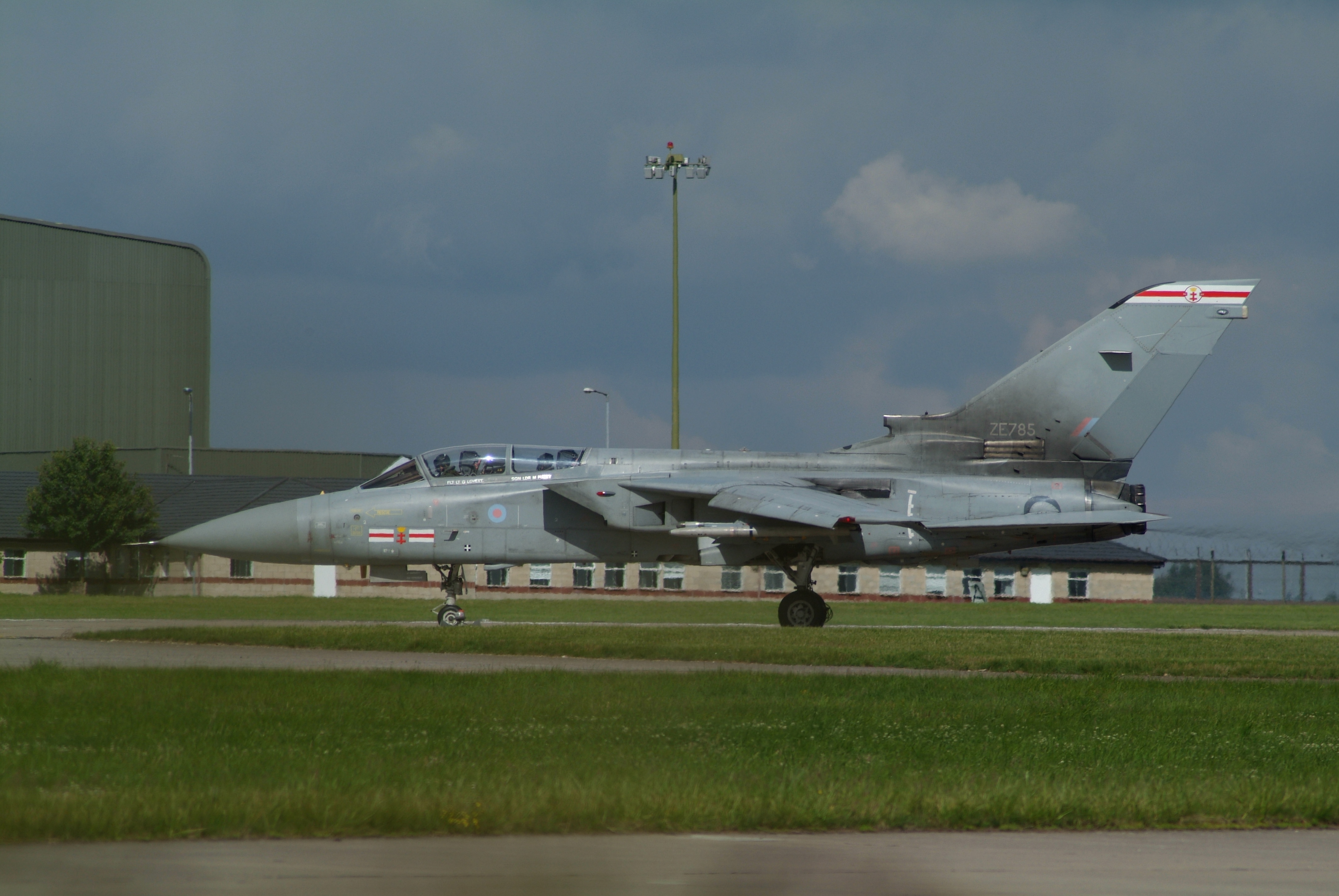
A Panavia Tornado F3 of No. 41 Squadron in 2007

The Fast Jet and Weapons Operational Evaluation Unit (FJWOEU) was formed was created on 1 April 2004 from the merger of the Strike Attack Operational Evaluation Unit; the Panavia Tornado F3 Operational Evaluation Unit; and the Air Guided Weapons Operational Evaluation Unit. The FJWOEU took over No. 41 Squadron's number plate on 1 April 2006, rescuing No. 41 Squadron from disbandment that would have otherwise resulted from the retirement of the RAF's Jaguar fleet. The squadron's fleet consisted of Panavia Tornado GR4, Panavia Tornado F3 and BAe Harrier GR9. In 2006 the squadron also celebrated its 90th anniversary. It remained in the role of FJWOEU until 2010, during that time testing numerous weapons and defence systems that were subsequently deployed by British forces on the front line, including Afghanistan.

==== Test and evaluation ====
On 1 April 2010, the Fast Jet Test Squadron (FJTS), then based at MOD Boscombe Down in Wiltshire, was amalgamated into No. 41 (Reserve) Squadron to create a new entity, No. 41 Squadron Test and Evaluation Squadron, in which form it continues today.

In September 2010, the squadron celebrated the 70th anniversary of the Battle of Britain, holding an event at RAF Coningsby attended by families of pilots of the Second World War era. The squadron applied war-era 'EB' codes to the tail fins of its current aircraft, recognising various war-time pilots and their aircraft. Originally, some of these codes were applied to the squadron's Harriers, but when these were retired, the codes were then applied to the squadron's Tornados, and subsequently Typhoons, that replaced them. They commemorated the following Second World War aircraft:

No. 41 Squadron 21st century aircraft with Second World War era commemorative markings
Current aircraft		Code	Historic aircraft		Date	Original pilot ‡
Type	Reg.	Code	Type	Reg.	Date	Original pilot ‡
Typhoon FGR4	ZJ947	EB-L	Spitfire Ia	K9805	August 1940	Wing Commander Edward A. Shipman
Tornado GR4	ZA447	EB-R	Spitfire Ia	P9428	September 1940	Squadron Leader Hilary R. L. 'Robin' Hood
Typhoon FGR4	ZJ930	EB-R	Spitfire Ia	P9428	September 1940	Squadron Leader Hilary R. L. 'Robin' Hood
Typhoon FGR4	ZJ914	EB-G	Spitfire Ia	N3162	September 1940	Flight Lieutenant Eric S. 'Lockie' Lock
Typhoon FGR4	ZJ912	EB-J	Spitfire Ia	X4559	September 1940	Squadron Leader George H. 'Ben' Bennions
Tornado GR4	ZG775	EB-Z	Spitfire IIa	P7666	November 1940	Group Captain Donald O. Finlay
Tornado GR4	ZA560	EB-Q	Spitfire Va	R7304	August 1941	Warrant Officer William A. 'Bill' Brew (RAAF)
Tornado GR4	ZA607	EB-X				
Typhoon FGR4	ZK339	EB-B	Spitfire XII	MB882	September 1944	Squadron Leaderr Terence 'Terry' Spencer
Typhoon FGR4	ZJ914	EB-H	Spitfire XIV	NH915	May 1945	Flight Lieutenant Derek Rake
Typhoon T3	ZJ815	EB-H	Spitfire XIV	NH915	May 1945	Flight Lieutenant Derek Rake
Typhoon FGR4	ZK339	EB-E				

‡ – rank indicated is final rank achieved upon leaving RAF service

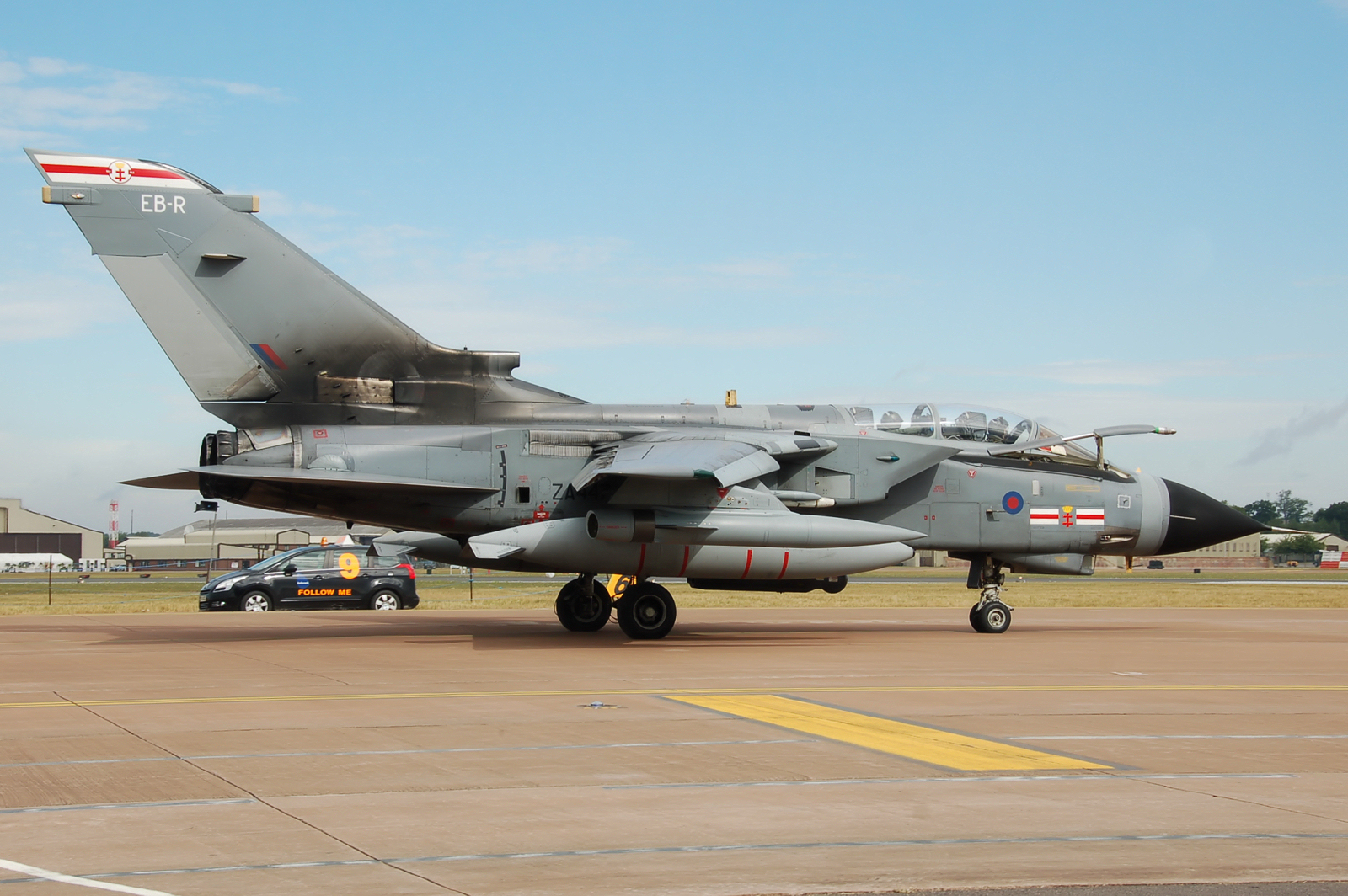
Panavia Tornado GR4 of No. 41 Squadron at the 2010 Royal International Air Tattoo, RAF Fairford

Commencing the draw-down of the RAF's Harrier force as a result of the Strategic Defence and Security Review 2010, No. 41 Squadron's three Harrier GR9 were transferred to No. 1 (Fighter) Squadron at RAF Cottesmore on 4 November 2010. No. 41 Squadron subsequently increased its fleet of Tornado GR4 to compensate the loss of the Harriers, and only operated the GR4 until April 2013.

On 29 April 2011, two of the squadron's Tornado GR4 flew with two Eurofighter Typhoons from RAF Coningsby in a flypast down over Central London for the Royal Wedding of Prince William and Catherine Middleton. One of the Tornados was flown by the squadron's then Officer Commanding, Wing Commander Rich Davies. In 2012, to mark the London 2012 Olympic Games, No. 41 Squadron unveiled special tail markings on Tornado GR4, ZA614, EB-Z, to commemorate the squadron's link with the Olympic Games. Group Captain Donald O. Finlay, who commanded the squadron from September 1940 to August 1941, had won bronze in the men's hurdles at the 1932 Los Angeles Games, won silver in the same event at the 1936 Berlin Games, and read the Olympic Oath at the commencement of 1948 London Games.

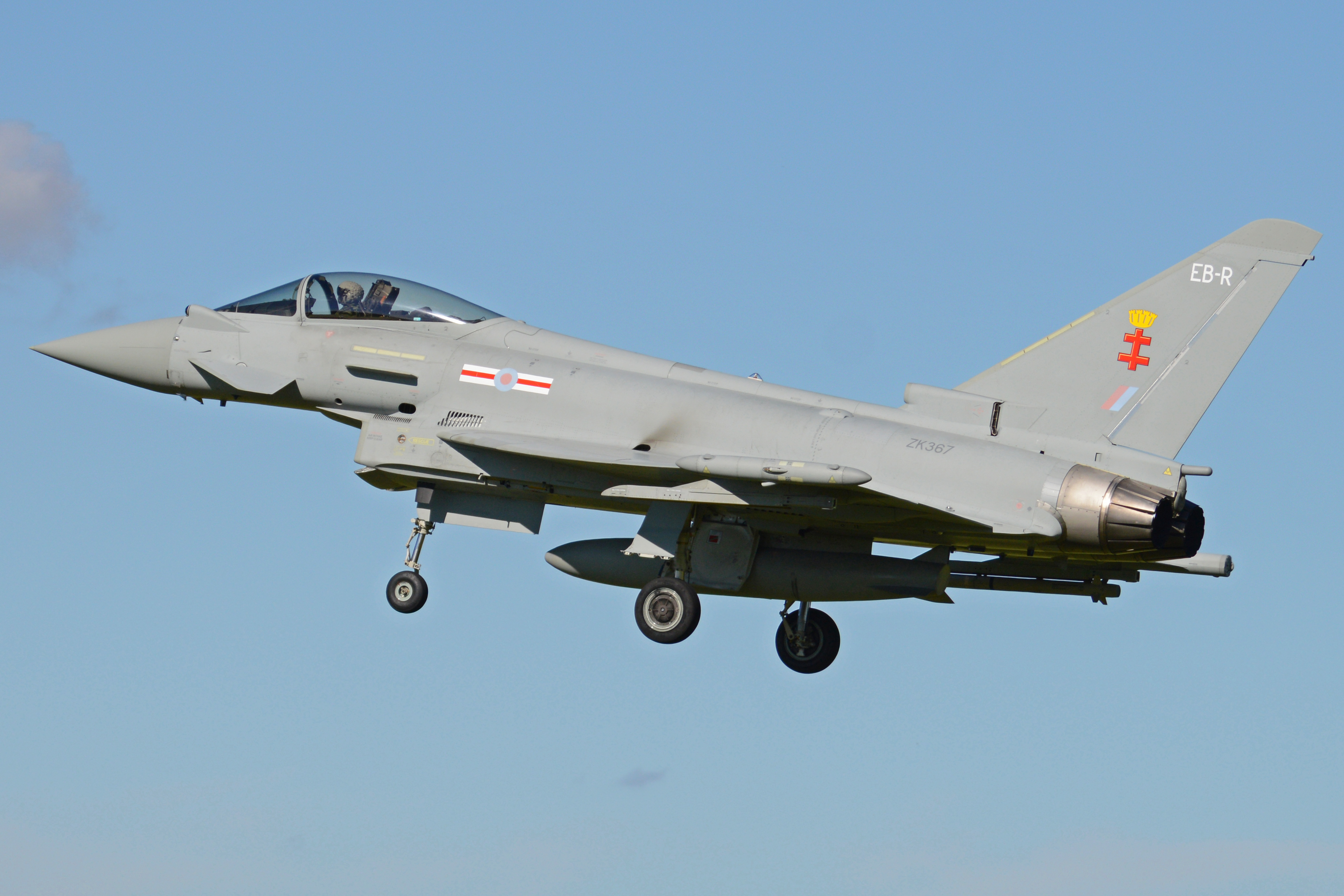
A Eurofighter Typhoon FGR4 of No. 41 Squadron in 2017

The first published history book of No. 41 Squadron, Blood, Sweat, and Valour, was launched at the Royal Air Force Club in London in December 2012, and recounts the unit's wartime activity during the war years August 1942 to May 1945. A second volume, entitled Blood, Sweat and Courage was launched at the RAF Club in December 2014, and covers the preceding war years, September 1939 to July 1942. Another major change took place on 22 April 2013, when No. 41 Squadron took over the Eurofighter Typhoon FGR4 of fellow RAF Coningsby based No. 17 (R) Test and Evaluation Squadron, which was began preparing for the introduction of the F-35B Lightning into RAF and Royal Navy service.

No. 41 Squadron's Second World War-era EB codes were carried over onto three of their new Typhoon aircraft. An additional Typhoon aircraft also joined the squadron, prompting the need for an eighth code, and the opportunity to honour another of the squadron's pilots. After having initially been coded EB-G for Flt Lt Eric S. 'Lockie' Lock the honour went to Gp Capt Derek S. V. Rake (1945) and Typhoon ZJ914 was coded EB-H.

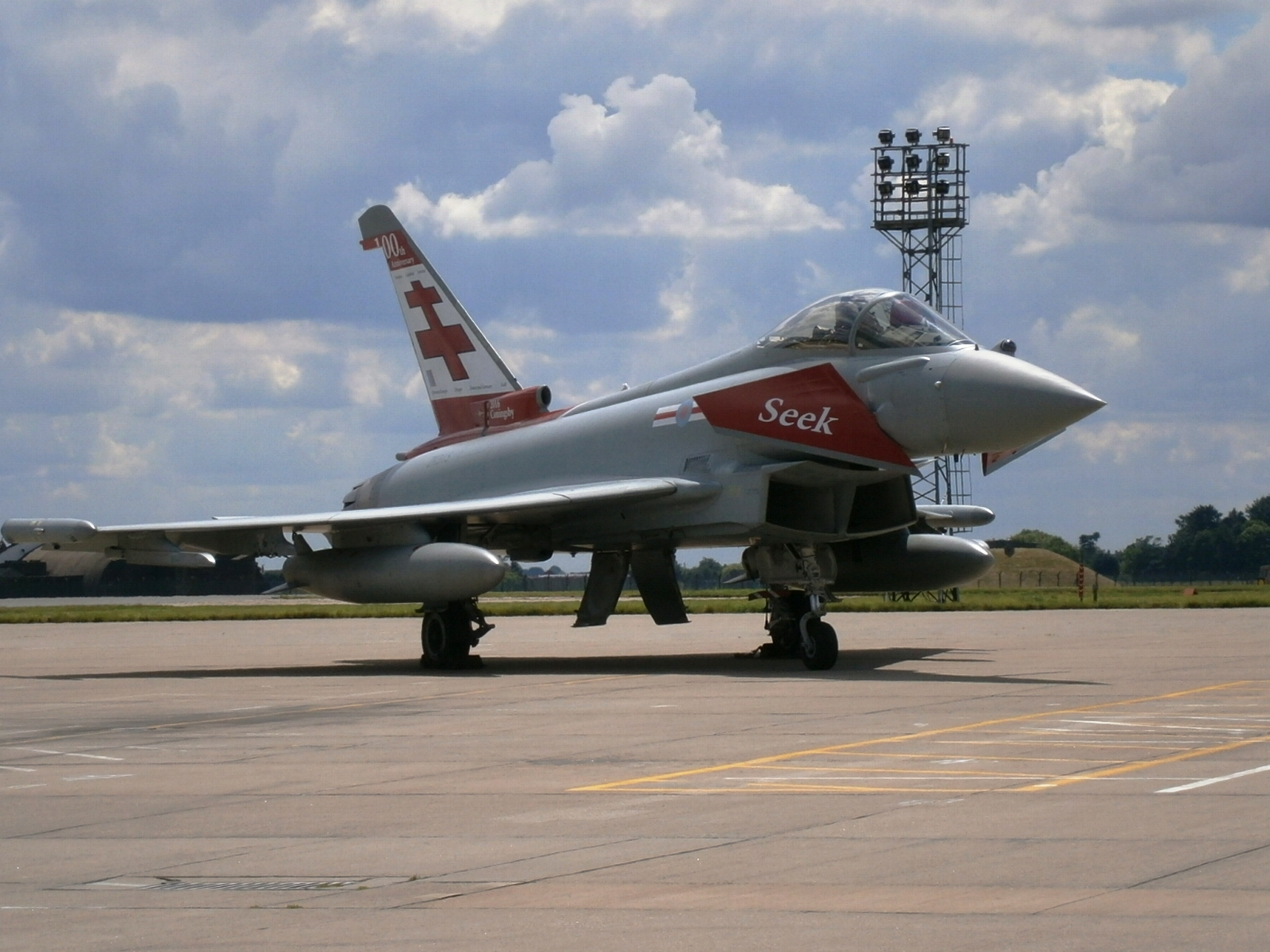
No. 41 Squadron's Eurofighter Typhoon ZK315 wearing a centenary paint-scheme on 14 July 2016

No. 41 Squadron celebrated its centenary in July 2016, by holding a parade and gala dinner at RAF Coningsby on 14 July, and a Friends and Families Open Day on 22 July. The No. 41 Squadron Association was also formed to coincide with the centenary.

The squadron's Panavia Tornados were phased out in late 2017, and the last flight in this aircraft type took place on Friday 13 October 2017. No. 41 Squadron retains the Eurofighter Typhoon FGR4.

All Second World War era EB codes have now been removed from the squadron's tailfins, but one Tornado has been preserved as a gate guardian at MOD Sealand, marked EB-X, which includes the squadron badge and centenary tail art.

== Aircraft operated ==
- Airco DH.1 Scout (April 1916)
- MF.7 Longhorn (April 1916)
- MF.11 Shorthorn (April 1916)
- Royal Aircraft Factory F.E.8 (July 1916)
- Airco DH.2 Scout (August 1916)
- Henri Farman HF.20 (August 1916)
- Vickers F.B.5 Gun Bus (September 1916)
- Airco DH.5 (July 1917)
- Royal Aircraft Factory S.E.5a (October 1917)
- Sopwith 7F.1 Snipe (April 1923)
- Armstrong Whitworth Siskin III and IIIa (April 1924)
- Bristol Bulldog 105A Mk. IIa (October 1931)
- Hawker Demon Mk. I (July 1934)
- Hawker Fury Mk. II (October 1937)
- Supermarine Spitfire Mk. I (December 1938)
- Supermarine Spitfire Mk. Ia (September 1939)
- Supermarine Spitfire Mk. IIa (October 1940)
- Supermarine Spitfire Mk. Ia (February 1941)
- Supermarine Spitfire Mk. IIa (March 1941)
- Supermarine Spitfire Mk. Va and Vb (July 1941)
- Supermarine Spitfire Mk. XII (February 1943)
- Supermarine Spitfire Mk. XIV (September 1944)
- Hawker Tempest Mk. V (September 1945)
- Supermarine Spitfire Mk. F.21 (April 1946)
- Airspeed Oxford AS.10 (August 1947)
- North American Harvard (August 1947)
- de Havilland Hornet F.1 (June 1948)
- de Havilland Hornet F.3 (August 1948)
- Gloster Meteor F.4 (January 1951)
- Gloster Meteor F.8 (April 1951)
- Hawker Hunter F.5 (July 1955)
- Gloster Javelin FAW.4 (February 1958)
- Gloster Javelin FAW.8 (January 1960)
- Bloodhound Mk. II (September 1965)
- McDonnell Douglas Phantom FGR.2 (April 1972)
- SEPECAT Jaguar GR1 (July 1976)
- SEPECAT Jaguar GR.3 (May 1997)
- SEPECAT Jaguar GR.3A and T4 (April 2006)
- BAe Harrier GR9 (April 2006)
- Panavia Tornado F3 (April 2006)
- Panavia Tornado GR4 (April 2006)
- Eurofighter Typhoon FGR4 (April 2013)

== Heritage ==
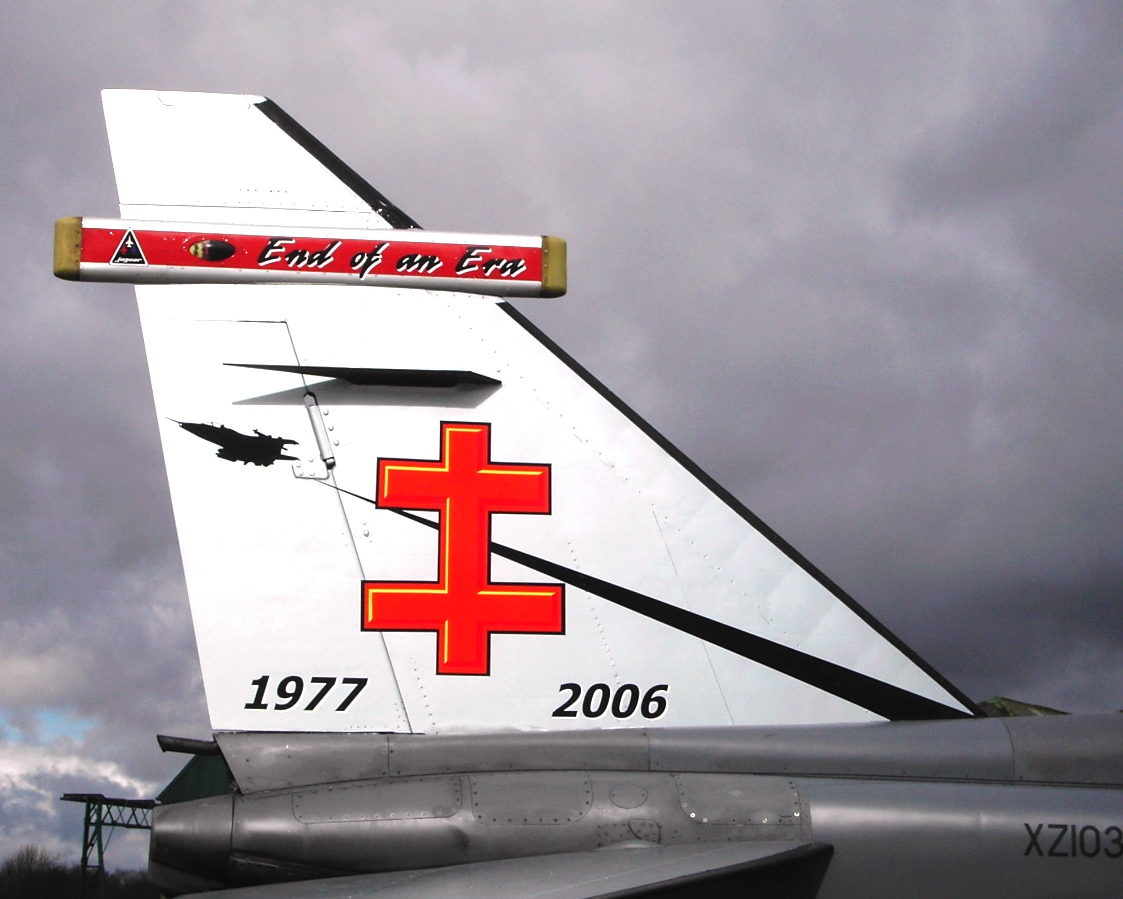
No. 41 Squadron SEPECAT Jaguar tail with a commemorative tail-fin showing the squadron's double-armed cross in 2006.

The squadron's badge features a red double-armed cross on a white background, originating from the squadron's association with Saint-Omer, France which was its first overseas base in 1916 during the First World War. The cross is part of the town's arms. The badge was approved by King George VI in February 1937.

The squadron's motto is seek and destroy.

== Battle honours ==
No. 41 Squadron has received the following battle honours. Those marked with an asterisk (*) may be emblazoned on the squadron standard.

- Western Front (1916–1918)*
- Somme (1916)*
- Arras (1917)*
- Cambrai (1917)*
- Somme (1918)
- Lys (1918)
- Amiens (1918)*
- Dunkirk (1940)
- Battle of Britain (1940)*
- Home Defence (1940–1944)
- Fortress Europe (1940–1944)*
- Dieppe (1940–1944)*
- France & Germany (1944–1945)*
- Arnhem (1944–1945)
- Walcheren (1944–1945)
- Gulf (1991)

== Notable pilots ==
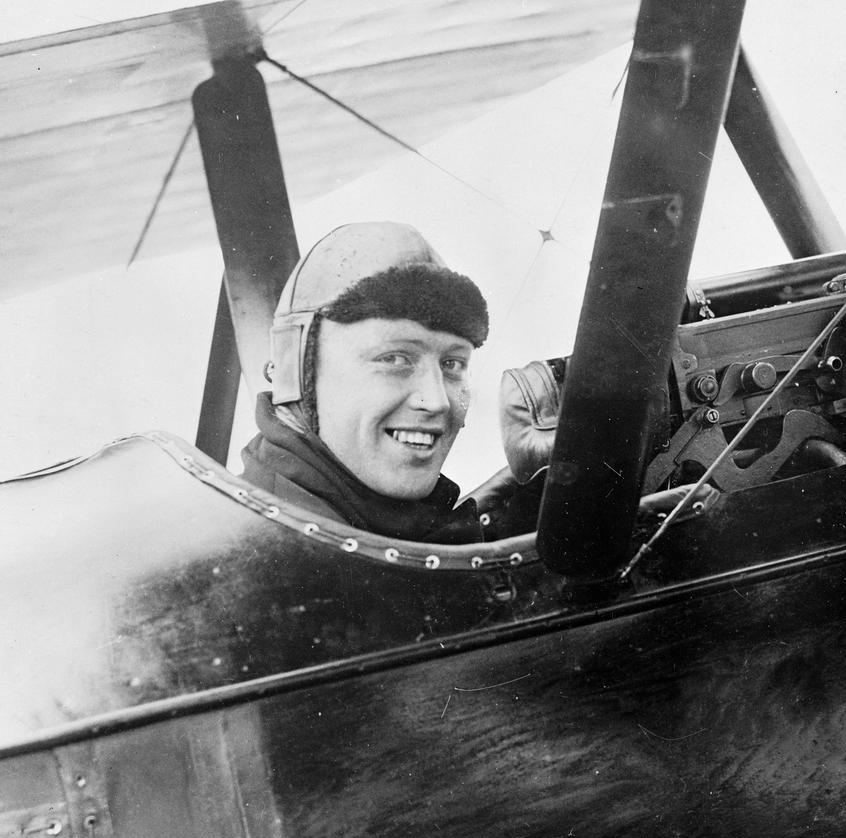
Sqn Ldr Raymond Collishaw DSO & Bar OBE DSC DFC, the third-highest-scoring Allied pilot of World War I.

- Captain Valentine Baker MC AFC served with 41 Squadron from 1916 to June 1917, and served briefly as a Flight Commander. He left the RAF in 1922 to work for Vickers-Armstrong. In 1934, however, he formed the Martin-Baker Aircraft Company with his colleague James Martin, to design new aircraft and offer flying lessons. One of their more notable pupils was Amy Johnson. The company went on to manufacture and market four different propeller aircraft, but Baker himself was killed in a flying accident in 1942, whilst test-flying the third of these. It was his death, however, that caused his business partner to rethink safety, and develop a means of assisted escape for pilots. As a result, Martin-Baker began to manufacture ejection seats in 1946, and still does today for both fixed wing and rotary military aircraft. Amongst 80 types of aircraft into which their seats have been fitted are the Jaguar, which 41 Squadron flew from 1977 to 2006, the Harrier, which the squadron flew from 2006 to 2010, and the Tornado and Typhoon, both of which they fly today. Martin-Baker ejection seats are now being fitted into the F-35 Joint Strike Fighter. Over 70,000 Martin-Baker ejection seats have been delivered to 93 air forces, which have saved almost 7,500 lives. It is a squadron legacy that in giving his own life, Baker has saved the lives of thousands of others.
- American Lieutenant Eugene Barksdale served with 41 Squadron from July to October 1918, during which time he claimed two victories and was wounded in action. In October 1918, he transferred to the American Expeditionary Force and returned home to become as USAAF test pilot. Clearly a talented pilot in this early era of flight, he is perhaps best known for having flown an Airco DH-4 light bomber from McCook Field in Dayton, Ohio, to Mitchel Field, which became Mitchel AFB in New York, a distance of some 600 miles (970 kilometres) solely on instruments. However, in August 1926, whilst testing a Douglas O-2 observation aircraft for spin characteristics over McCook Field, he was unable to recover the aircraft and was killed. Buried with full military honours at Arlington National Cemetery, the USAF's Barksdale Air Force Base near Bossier City, Louisiana, was named in his honour when opened in February 1933. The base is currently home to five squadrons of B52 Stratofortresses. Barksdale Street, on Hanscom AFB, Massachusetts, is also named after him.
- Canadian Squadron Leader Frederick R. G. McCall served on 41 Squadron from May to August 1918, in that time claiming 31 victories, which were in addition to a previous four claimed on 13 Sqn. His achievements on 41 were recognised with the award of a DSO and a DFC. Following the war, McCall was employed in civil aviation, and subsequently served at home as a Squadron Leader in the RCAF during World War II. He died in 1949, aged just 53, but by that time had dedicated over 30 years of his life to flying. In recognition of his service to Canadian aviation, a new airfield in Calgary was named McCall Field in his honour. That airfield is today Calgary International Airport.
- Having claimed 60 aerial victories during the First World War, Canadian Air Vice-Marshal Raymond Collishaw is considered the third-highest-scoring Allied pilot of the entire War. By his arrival on 41 Squadron in 1923 as its second peacetime Officer Commanding, he had been awarded no less than two DSOs, a military OBE, a DSC, a DFC, three MiDs, the French Croix de Guerre, and the three White Russian Orders of St. Stanislas, St. Anne, and St. Vladimir. Along with his significant victory tally, he was very much a legend in his own time. Collishaw retired in October 1943 and spent the rest of the war as a Regional Air Liaison Officer for Civil Defence UK. By the time he returned to his native Canada in 1946, he had also been awarded a CB and a civil OBE.
- Having graduated from Sandhurst in 1915, Air Commodore Patrick Huskinson was seconded to the RFC later that same year, and served on 2, 4, and 19 Squadrons before the cessation of hostilities. He was credited with 11 victories, and awarded two Military Crosses. Following the war, he commanded 204 and 70 Squadrons, and then spent four years in instructing roles at Cranwell. For the following 11 years from the mid-1920s, he fulfilled armament and ordinance roles in the United Kingdom and Middle East, with the exception of a 20-month period between February 1930 and October 1931 when he commanded 41 Squadron. Returning to ordinance in March 1938, he became vice president of the Ordnance Committee at Woolwich Arsenal, and then the Director of Armament Development with the Ministry of Aircraft Production in 1940, reporting to Lord Beaverbrook. In April 1941, however, Huskinson and his wife were seriously injured by Luftwaffe night-time bombing in the Blitz and Huskinson was blinded. Following nine months' convalescence, he was retired as an Air Commodore in January 1942. However, he immediately became the president of the Air Armament Board, which post he held until 1945. In this role, he was involved in the development of large bunker-busting bombs, such as the Tall Boy, and in several other technologies, despite his handicap. In 1945, he was appointed a CBE and awarded the U.S. Legion of Merit for his work in this role. Huskinson also wrote an autobiography in 1949 called Vision Ahead, which explains his career in some detail. He also recalls his "very happy years in charge of Number 41 Squadron". It was also Huskinson who wrote to the Mayor of St. Omer and obtained permission for 41 Squadron to use part of the Town Arms in its badge.
- Air Commodore Allen H. Wheeler CBE was granted a Short Service Commission in 1924, and served on 41 Squadron as a Flight Commander from September 1933 to August 1936. During this time, he was deployed to Aden with the squadron, arriving there six weeks ahead of the main group and aircraft, as a member of the advance party. From 1940 to 1944, Wheeler's postings related to experimental aircraft and aircraft development, both with the Performance Testing Squadron at Boscombe Down and the Aeroplane and Armament Experimental Establishment at Farnborough, for which he was mentioned in dispatches. Between February and October 1944, Wheeler was Station Commander at RAF Fairford, where he was involved in glider deployment for D-Day operations and the Arnhem landings. His contribution was recognised with the award of an OBE in the 1945 New Year's Honours. Following further postings, including to Asia and the Mediterranean, Wheeler returned to the Aircraft & Armament Experimental Establishment at Boscombe as it Commandant. He was appointed a CBE whilst there and retired in May 1955. Wheeler was subsequently employed as an aviation consultant and technical advisor to the film industry, and worked on such films as The Blue Max and Those Magnificent Men in their Flying Machines, and was even used as a pilot in the latter movie.
- Flight Lieutenant Thomas Weston Peel Long Chaloner, The Honourable Lord Gisborough, 2nd Baron Gisborough of Cleveland, Yorkshire, was a WWI pilot and ex-Prisoner of War who returned to RAF service during World War II. He served as 41 Squadron's Intelligence Officer for over five years of the War, and reported the squadron's activity, victories and losses up the chain of command on a daily basis. He refused further promotion.
- Squadron Leader George Bennions was posted to 41 Squadron in February 1936. It was here that he remained for the ensuing almost five years, and he was commissioned on the Sqn in April 1940. Bennions proved to be quite a talented pilot, and he claimed his first victory over the Channel in July 1940, during the earliest salvoes of the Battle of Britain. Over the months of August and September, Bennions' tally continued to rise to the point where he had claimed ten and one shared destroyed, seven probably destroyed, and five damaged, making him the second most successful pilot on 41 Squadron during World War II. Aside from his significant victory tally during the Battle of Britain, Bennions is of interest for one of those victories, which took place on 5 September 1940. Contemporary researchers credit him with a shared victory over Oblt Franz von Werra, the Group Adjutant of JG3, who was flying an Me109E. Von Werra's aircraft is believed to have been damaged by Bennions but finished off by 603 Squadron's Plt Off Basil Stapleton, forcing the German pilot to crash-land near Marden, Kent. Von Werra was captured unhurt and sent to Canada, as were the majority of German POWs, to hinder their chances of escape. However, von Werra nonetheless succeeded in escaping, and returned to Germany in April 1941. So unusual was this feat that he was the only German POW to succeed in doing so during the War. Von Werra's story was the subject of a book, and also of a film entitled The One That Got Away, which was released in 1957 and starred Hardy Krüger as von Werra.

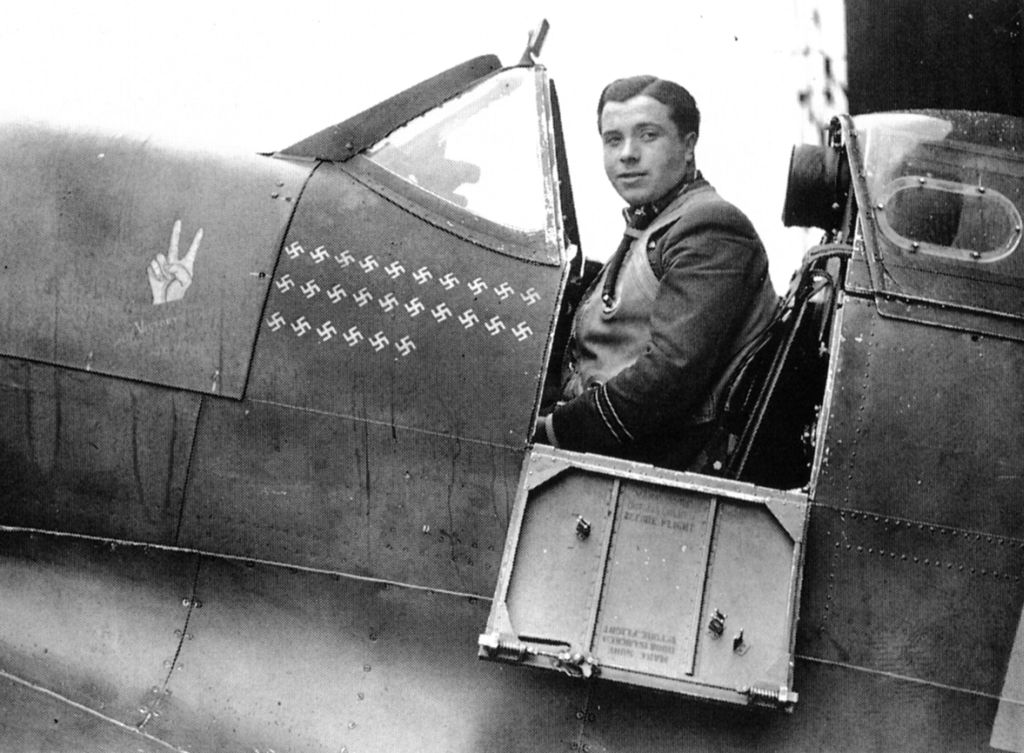
Flt Lt Eric S. Lock, July 1941

- Pilot Officer Eric Lock joined the RAF Volunteer Reserve in February 1939, and was posted to 41 Squadron as his first operational unit, in mid-June 1940. Lock's first operational sortie took place on 9 August 1940, which was uneventful, as was his second a few days later. However, between 15 August and 17 November 1940, Lock claimed no less than 22 aircraft destroyed, and he became the most successful RAF pilot of the Battle of Britain, and the equal second highest-scoring pilot in the RAF at the time. Over the three consecutive months of September, October, and November 1940, Lock was awarded a DFC, a Bar, and a DSO. On the afternoon of 5 September 1940, 41 Squadron's most intensive day of the Battle of Britain, Lock claimed three victories in a single sortie. The aircraft he flew that day, Spitfire Ia, N3162, EB-G, is recognised by 41 Squadron, which has the letters EB-G on one of their Typhoons, and by the BBMF, which has EB-G emblazoned on their Spitfire P7350. Lock was seriously wounded in action on 17 November 1940, and underwent multiple operations, which included three skin grafts, at the hands of Dr. Archibald McIndoe at East Grinstead. Following seven months' recuperation, he returned to operations with 611 Squadron in late June 1941. During July 1941, he added another three victories to his already impressive list, but on 3 August, he failed to return from a routine operation after attacking a German column on a road behind Boulogne. In recognition of his achievements and status in Battle of Britain history, he is remembered on several memorials and in his hometown of Bayston Hill, outside Shrewsbury, where a street is named after him. He remains today one of the RAF's top ten Aces of World War II, credited with some 25 aircraft destroyed and 7 probably destroyed, all bar three of which he achieved on 41 Squadron.
- Group Captain Donald O. Finlay: pre-war Olympian and Officer Commanding 41 Squadron, September 1940 to August 1941. 41 Squadron honoured Finlay during the 2012 London Olympics by painting the tail-fin of one of the unit's Tornados. Although that aircraft was recently retired, the squadron continues to honour Finlay with one of the Tornados marked up as EB-Z.
- South African Pilot Officer J. J. 'Chris' Le Roux flew with 41 Squadron for a short period in late 1940 to early 1941. In July 1944, by now OC, 602 Squadron, Le Roux was credited with attacking and seriously injuring General Erwin Rommel in his staff car, on a road outside Sainte Foy de Montgomerie, in Normandy. Strafing the vehicle, the driver lost control, struck a tree and spun off the road. Rommel fractured his skull when he was thrown from the vehicle. In doing so, Le Roux single-handedly removed Germany's commanding general from the Normandy battlefield.
- Dutch Flight Lieutenant Bram van der Stok was posted to 41 Squadron as a Fg Off in December 1941. Promoted to Actg Flt Lt and appointed OC A Flight in March 1942, he quickly claimed two victories, but was shot down over France the following month. Taken into immediate captivity, he was sent to Stalag Luft III, Sagan, where he remained until March 1944, when he took part in the mass escape of airmen that we know today as The Great Escape. All but three of the escapees were recaptured, and fifty of them were executed as retribution on Hitler's orders. Of the three that successfully made their escapes, van der Stok was one. Acting as a Dutch labourer on forged papers, he made it back the United Kingdom in early July 1944, travelling on a route, which took him through the Netherlands, Belgium, France, Spain, and Gibraltar. In 1963, United Artists released the film, The Great Escape, based upon a book of the same name, written by Australian author Paul Brickhill in 1950. In the film, a character broadly based on van der Stok was played by James Coburn.
- Canadian Sergeant Pilot George F. Beurling was posted to 41 Squadron in April 1942, but proved too head-strong, fought with other members of the unit, and gained a reputation for doing his own thing in the air and not remaining in formation or following orders. By the following month, he was requesting a transfer to Malta and it was granted. Nonetheless, in his brief time with 41 Squadron, he claimed his first two victories. In time, he became Canada's leading World War II ace, and was credited with 31 victories between May 1942 and December 1943. As a result, he was awarded a DSO, a DFC and two DFMs. However, he was 'retired' early from the RCAF in 1944 as his skill in cockpit was matched by streak of rebelliousness, and disrespect for authority. He had a reputation for ignoring team tactics and breaking formation to attack the enemy alone, and had gained two nicknames, 'Buzz Beurling' and the not-so-complimentary 'Screwball Beurling'.
- Prince Emanuel Vladimirovitch Galitzine was the great-great-grandson of Catherine the Great. He fled Russia with his parents and siblings in the wake of the October Revolution in 1917, and settled in England, where he was educated. Galitzine joined the RAF Volunteer Reserve on a Short Service Commission in late 1938, but left again to go to Finland in early 1940 to fight the Soviets attempting to occupy the country. Returning to London again in October 1940, after his mother was killed in the Blitz, Galitzine rejoined the RAFVR, but had to do so as an aircraftsman, though he was recommissioned in September 1941. Galitzine saw operational service in several squadrons before joining 41 Squadron as a Fg Off in May 1943, and he claimed a probably destroyed enemy aircraft with the unit in October. Following his tenure with the squadron, he was rested as personal assistant to Air Vice-Marshal Sir William Dickson, then commanding 83 Group, which was preparing for the Normandy invasion. When Dickson was posted to Italy, Galitzine accompanied him, adding Italian to an already impressive list of languages he spoke. Following the War, Galitzine worked in the civil aviation industry, but maintained links with Russia and, in 1998, attended the reburial and funeral service of the murdered Tsar and his family in St Petersburg.
- Flying Officer Peter Gibbs was a generally unassuming character who served with 41 Squadron between January 1944 and March 1945. He was an active pilot during his tour, and an avid musician. He became a professional musician after he left the RAF in August 1945, and joined the Philharmonia Orchestra in 1954. Within two years, he had joined the London Symphony Orchestra and during this time became (in)famous for a dressing down he gave to one of the century's most celebrated performing artists, Herbert von Karajan. The orchestra felt von Karajan had been unprofessional when conducting smaller, 'less important' concerts during a tour of the United States in 1956. He had often just bowed once and left the stage at the end of concerts, refusing to return for encores, despite the applause from the audience. The orchestra was slighted by this behaviour, and eventually had had enough. The last straw came when von Karajan left the stage in Boston after the last note was played, neither waiting for applause nor calls for an encore. The orchestra, in which Gibbs was playing first violin, was upset by this apparent insult to both them and the audience, but turned up nonetheless on time for an early rehearsal the following morning. Von Karajan, however, came in late, much to the disgruntlement of the orchestra. When he finally arrived, Peter Gibbs, an impromptu, self-appointed spokesman, stood up and addressed him directly, demanding an apology. He rebuked von Karajan, stating, "I did not spend four years of my life fighting bastards like you to be insulted before our own allies as you did last evening". Von Karajan ignored him completely and continued conducting as if nothing had happened. That night, however, during a concert, von Karajan chose his moment and, during the interval, refused to go back on stage until a letter was signed stating that Gibbs be immediately sacked. The orchestra's managers had little choice but to bow to the demand. Although Gibbs was never to play with the Philharmonia again after this incident, it is understood that von Karajan also never conducted the Philharmonia again after the tour either, and it is said that he vowed to never conduct an English orchestra again. All this time, Gibbs also flew privately. He had joined the Surrey Flying Club in June 1957, and then flew more-or-less continuously for the next 18 years. Gibbs bought himself a Tiger Moth and enjoyed peacetime flying. However, flying was also what brought about his premature death in December 1975. He took off for a brief flight in a Cessna from Glenforsa Airfield on the Isle of Mull in Scotland on Christmas Eve 1975, but failed to return. A search was mounted but no trace whatsoever could be found of him. Oddly, his body was found four months after his disappearance part way up a hill, approximately one mile from Glenforsa Airfield, without his aircraft, showing the signs of having lain there all that time. The original search for Gibbs had passed through the area at the time he had gone missing, but nothing had been seen. His body gave away no clues as to his cause of death. Gibbs' missing Cessna bewildered officials and his case soon became known as the 'Great Mull Air Mystery'. It was not until September 1986; almost 11 years after Gibbs' death, that his aircraft was located in the sea off Oban. The aircraft's remains also gave up no clue as to the reason it was there. It can only be assumed that Gibbs, for some reason, came down in the sea and that he had managed to free himself and swim ashore. It is thought he then tried to make his way back to the airfield, around a mile away, but, considering the time of year, location, and likely temperatures of both the water and air, probably succumbed to the effects of exposure.

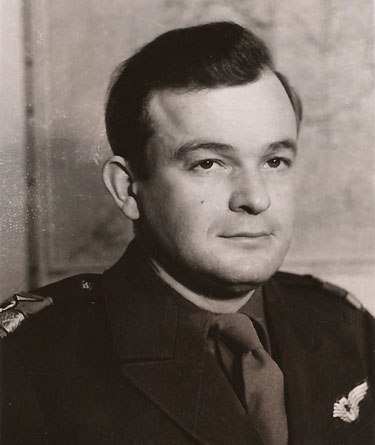
Aharon Remez, who served as an NCO pilot with 41 Squadron in 1945, became the first Commander of the Israeli Air Force in 1948.

- Palestinian Sergeant Pilot Aharon Remez was posted to his first and only operational unit, 41 Squadron, in April 1945, and served with the unit until March 1946, and was not commissioned in the RAF. Based in Germany during the last weeks of the war and beyond, he witnessed Nazi atrocities first hand, and often lent a personal hand. The officers of 41 Squadron turned a blind eye, and he was given special leave to allow him to be able to do so. This enabled him to commence assisted passage for many holocaust survivors to the Middle East. Remez left the RAF in 1946 and returned home to champion the formation of a Jewish State. This occurred in May 1948, and in July he was given the post of Brigadier General and the founder and first Commanding Officer of the Israeli Air Force. He held this post until December 1950. Remez was subsequently the Head of Purchasing Delegation, Israeli MOD mission to the United States, the Israeli Defence Minister's Aide for Aviation, a member of the House Committee & Foreign Affairs & Defence Committees of the 3rd Knesset, Director of the Dept for International Co-operation in the Foreign Affairs Ministry, Director General of the Israeli Ports Authority, and Chairman of the Israeli Aviation Authority. Remez was also the Israeli Ambassador to the United Kingdom from May 1965 to July 1970, and often met up with his former 41 Squadron colleagues from 1945 whilst based there.
- Squadron Leader Terry Spencer was originally commissioned with the Royal Engineers in December 1939, he transferred to the RAFVR as a Plt Off in October 1941. Following training, he was posted to 26 Squadron at Gatwick in November 1942, and remained with this unit until February 1944, in that time being promoted to Flt Lt, and he left the unit as a Flight Commander. Following a brief posting to 165 Squadron, Spencer was posted to 41 Squadron as OC A Flt at the beginning of May 1944. Arriving just prior to D-Day, he led the Squadron on a number of operations in advance support of the invasion, and then led the unit on anti-diver operations from June 1944, when the V1 Doodlebug menace commenced. Within four months, he had become a V1 Ace, with seven shot down, and also claimed a destroyed German fighter, thereby ending the career of a 171-victory Luftwaffe Ace Emil 'Bully' Lang. Spencer was posted to 350 Squadron within the same Wing to take command on 4 January 1945. On 26 February, however, he was hit by flak over Germany and captured. A month later, he escaped from camp by bicycle, and subsequently motorcycle, with another former 41 Sqn pilot, Sqn Ldr Keith 'Jimmy' Thiele, in a Steve-McQueen-style getaway, in which the pair made it back to Allied lines. Spencer returned to 350 Squadron, where he once again took over command on 2 April 1945. Only 17 days later, he was shot down once again, this time over Wismar Bay, in northern Germany. Blown out of his cockpit, the force deployed his parachute at a height of just 30–40 feet, which he miraculously survived, only to be captured again. The successful jump has since been credited by the Guinness Book of Records as having been the lowest authenticated survived bale-out on record. Spencer was injured and hospitalised, but liberated by advancing Allied armies approximately two weeks later. He was awarded an immediate DFC for his exploits. In 1947, he was also awarded the Territorial Efficiency Medal and the Belgian Croix de Guerre with Palm. Spencer was demobbed in December 1945 and headed to South Africa in spring 1946, taking three weeks to fly himself there in a single-engined Percival Proctor. He was employed there as the personal pilot of Ben du Preez, managing director of Kimlite Industries, which was a cover for illicit diamond buying. Spencer then returned to the United Kingdom where he met the actress Lesley Brook, who starred in at least 24 films between 1937 and 1948. They married in August 1947, and resided for a time on the Isle of Wight, before returning to South Africa in July 1948. On this occasion, he launched a new career by founding the aerial photography company in October that same year. The company enjoyed some success, but he was to become a more successful freelance photographer for LIFE Magazine, for whom he worked between September 1952 and September 1972. During his time with LIFE, he covered several conflicts, including Biafra, Congo, and the Vietnam War, and spent three months on tour with a then little-known band called The Beatles. When LIFE folded in 1972, Spencer moved to People magazine, where he spent the ensuing 20 years. He authored and published two books, the first a renowned coffee table book about The Beatles (It was Thirty Years Ago Today), and the second an autobiography (Living Dangerously), which he co-authored with his wife. Following his death in February 2009, The Times published a glowing obituary of a man who was a real-life adventurer, and whose life and exploits were the very stuff of 'boys own' magazines.

== Statistics ==
=== Bases 1916–2026 ===
Base	Location	Arrival	Base	Location	Arrival
Fort Rowner, Gosport	Hampshire	1 April 1916	Westhampnett	Sussex	21 June 1943
Fort Rowner, Gosport	Hampshire	14 July 1916	Tangmere	Sussex	4 October 1943
St. Omer	France	15 October 1916	Southend	Essex	7 February 1944
Abeele	Belgium	21 October 1916	Tangmere	Sussex	20 February 1944
Hondschoote	France	24 May 1917	Friston	Sussex	11 March 1944
Abeele	Belgium	15 June 1917	Bolt Head	Devon	29 April 1944
Léalvillers	France	3 July 1917	Fairwood Common	Glamorgan	16 May 1944
Marieux	France	22 March 1918	Bolt Head	Devon	24 May 1944
Fienvillers	France	27 March 1918	West Malling	Kent	19 June 1944
Alquines	France	29 March 1918	Tangmere	Sussex	26 June 1944
Savy	France	9 April 1918	Westhampnett	Sussex	27 June 1944
Serny	France	11 April 1918	Friston	Sussex	2 July 1944
Estrée Blanche (Liettres)	France	19 May 1918	Lympne	Kent	11 July 1944
Conteville	France	1 June 1918	B.56 Evere	Belgium	4 December 1944
St. Omer	France	14 August 1918	B.64 Diest/Schaffen	Belgium	5 December 1944
Droglandt	France	20 September 1918	Y.32 Ophoven	Belgium	31 December 1944
Halluin East	France	23 October 1918	B.80 Volkel	Netherlands	27 January 1945
Tangmere	Sussex	7 February 1919	Warmwell	Dorset	7 Mar 1945
Croydon	Surrey	8 October 1919	B.78 Eindhoven	Netherlands	18 March 1945
Northolt	Middlesex	1 April 1923	B.106 Twente	Netherlands	7 April 1945
Underway to Aden	Yemen	4 October 1935	B.118 Celle	Germany	16 April 1945
Khormaksar	Yemen	20 October 1935	B.160 Kastrup	Denmark	9 May 1945
Sheikh Othman	Yemen	18 March 1936	B.172 Husum	Germany	21 June 1945
Underway to Southampton	Hampshire	10 August 1936	B.158 Lübeck	Germany	11 July 1945
Catterick	Yorkshire	25 September 1936	Warmwell	Dorset	20 August 1945
Wick	Caithness	19 October 1939	B.158 Lübeck	Germany	6 September 1945
Catterick	Yorkshire	25 October 1939	B.116 Wunstorf	Germany	30 January 1946
Hornchurch	Essex	28 May 1940	B.170 Sylt	Germany	28 February 1946
Catterick	Yorkshire	8 June 1940	B.116 Wunstorf	Germany	29 March 1946
Hornchurch	Essex	26 July 1940	Dalcross	Scotland	1 April 1946
Catterick	Yorkshire	8 August 1940	Wittering	Cambridge	8 April 1946
Hornchurch	Essex	3 September 1940	B.158 Lübeck	Germany	29 June 1946
Catterick	Yorkshire	23 February 1941	Duxford	Cambridge	9 September 1946
Merston	Sussex	28 July 1941	Wittering	Cambridge	30 September 1946
Westhampnett	Sussex	16 December 1941	Acklington	Northumberland	11 November 1946
Merston	Sussex	1 April 1942	Wittering	Cambridge	20 December 1946
Martlesham Heath	Suffolk	15 June 1942	Church Fenton	Yorkshire	17 April 1947
Hawkinge	Kent	30 June 1942	Biggin Hill	Kent	29 March 1951
Debden	Essex	8 July 1942	Coltishall	Norfolk	1 February 1958
Longtown	Cumberland	4 August 1942	Wattisham	Suffolk	5 July 1958
Llanbedr	Merioneth	9 August 1942	West Raynham	Norfolk	1 September 1965
Tangmere	Sussex	16 August 1942	Coningsby	Lincolnshire	1 April 1972
Llanbedr	Merioneth	20 August 1942	Coltishall	Norfolk	1 April 1977
Eglinton	Londonderry	22 September 1942	Thumrait AB4	Oman	13 August 1990
Llanbedr	Merioneth	30 September 1942	Seeb AB	Oman	29 August 1990
Tangmere	Sussex	8 October 1942	Muharraq	Bahrain	7 October 1990
Llanbedr	Merioneth	11 October 1942	Incirlik	Turkey	September 1991
High Ercall	Salop	25 February 1943	Gioia del Colle	Italy	August 1993
Hawkinge	Kent	13 April 1943	Incirlik	Turkey	September 2002
Biggin Hill	Kent	21 May 1943	Coningsby	Lincolnshire	1 April 2006
Friston	Sussex	28 May 1943			

=== Officers Commanding 1916–2026 ===
Name	Commenced	Name	Commenced
Joseph Herbert Arthur Landon, DSO, OBE	20 July 1916	Anthony Frederick Osborne, DFC	30 April 1951
Frederick James Powell, OBE (POW)	3 August 1917	John Miller, CBE, DFC, AFC, FCA	July 1951
Geoffrey Hilton Bowman, DSO, DFC, MC & Bar	9 February 1918	Maxwell Scannell OBE, DFC, AFC	June 1953
Bernard Edward Smythies, DFC	1 April 1923	James Castagnola, DSO, DFC & Bar	September 1955
Raymond Collishaw, CB, DSO & Bar, OBE, DSC, DFC	1 October 1923	John William James Leggett, QCVSA	1 February 1958
Gilbert Ware Murlis-Green, DSO & Bar, MC & 2 Bars	15 April 1924	David Windle Hutchinson-Smith, AFC	October 1959
Frederick Sowrey, DSO, MC, AFC	8 February 1926	John Frederick Pinnington	24 November 1961
Robert Stanley Aitken, CB, CBE, MC, AFC	1 September 1928	William Kent AFC	25 September 1965
Patrick Huskinson, CBE, MC & Bar	6 February 1930	Henry Ellis Angell DFC	6 December 1965
Stanley Flamank Vincent, CB, DFC, AFC	24 October 1931	George Henry Dodd	August 1968
John Auguste Boret, CBE, MC, AFC	1 May 1933	Brian James Lemon MBE, AFC	1 April 1972
John Simon Leslie Adams	4 March 1937	Peter David Leonard Gover MBE, AFC, BSc	March 1974
Geoffrey Augustus Graydon Johnston, CBE	28 August 1939	Sir Charles John Thomson, GCB CBE, AFC	October 1976
Hilary Richard Lionel Hood, DFC	22 April 1940	Christopher Granville-White CBE	4 December 1978
Robert Charles Franklin Lister	8 September 1940	Hilton Henry Moses MBE	8 March 1982
Donald Osborne Finlay, DFC, AFC	14 September 1940	David Kenworthy Norriss, QCVSA	November 1984
Lionel Manley Gaunce, DFC	9 August 1941	David Henry Milne-Smith	March 1987
Petrus Hendrik Hugo, DSO, DFC & 2 Bars	20 November 1941	George William Pixton DFC, AFC	September 1989
John Clarke Fee	12 April 1942	Derek Stephen Griggs AFC, BA	March 1992
Geoffrey Cockayne Hyde	28 July 1942	Sir Christopher Nigel Harper KBE	17 October 1994
Thomas Francis Neil, DFC & Bar, AFC	3 September 1942	John Patrick Moloney, MA, BA	January 1997
Bernard Ingham, DFC	25 July 1943	Graham A. Wright, BSc, HCSC	August 1999
Ian George Stewart Matthew, DFC	20 November 1943	Mark William Gardner Hopkins, MBE, MA, MSc	March 2002
Arthur Allan Glen, DFC & Bar	26 January 1944	Richard M. J. MacCormac, MA	September 2004
Robert Hugh Chapman	28 May 1944	Gary Martin Waterfall, CBE	1 April 2006
Douglas Ian Benham, OBE, DFC, AFC	28 August 1944	Andrew Michael Myers, MBE, MA	8 June 2007
John Bean Shepherd, DFC & 2 Bars	8 April 1945	Richard Andrew Davies, CBE, MA	November 2009
Henry Ambrose, DFC & Bar	28 January 1946	Mark Owen Rodden	6 June 2012
Peter Wilson Lovell, DFC, AFC	1 April 1946	Steven Berry, MBE, MEng	5 December 2014
William Hoy, DFC, AFC	20 January 1948	James Jody McMeeking	15 September 2017
Herbert Harold Moon	13 October 1948	Lee Gordon	1 April 2020
James Wallace, DSO, DFC, AFC	November 1949	Atila Batu BSc	September 2022
Raymond Brown Hesselyn, MBE, DFC, DFM & Bar	19 March 1951	Laura Frowen	27 March 2025

=== Decorations awarded 1916–1946 ===
Name	Date of Award
Distinguished Service Order	6
CLAXTON, William G.	2 November 1918
LANDON, Joseph H. A.	4 June 1917
MCCALL, Frederick R. G.	3 August 1918
LOCK, Eric S.	17 December 1940
HUGO, Petrus H.	29 May 1942
BURNE, Thomas R.	29 May 1945
Military Cross	6
BAKER, Valentine H.	24 July 1917
CHAPPELL, Roy W.	22 June 1918
DENISON, Amos A.	3 February 1917
MACLEAN, Loudoun J. (Bar)	1 February 1918
TAYLOR, Frank H.	22 June 1918
WINNICOTT, Russell	18 March 1918
Distinguished Flying Cross	30
CLAXTON, William G.	3 August 1918
CLAXTON, William G. (Bar)	21 September 1918
HEMMING, Alfred S.	2 November 1918
MACLEOD, Malcolm P.	3 June 1919
MCCALL, Frederick R. G.	3 August 1918
SHIELDS, William E.	2 November 1918
SHIELDS, William E. (Bar)	8 February 1919
SODEN, Frank O.	8 February 1919
STEPHENS, Eric J.	3 June 1919
RYDER, E. Norman	19 April 1940
HOOD, Hilary R. L.	11 August 1940
WEBSTER, J. Terence	20 August 1940
BENNIONS, George H.	1 October 1940
LOCK, Eric S.	1 October 1940
LOCK, Eric S. (Bar)	22 October 1940
MACKENZIE, John N.	15 November 1940
LOVELL, Anthony D. J.	26 November 1940
BUSH, Charles R.	14 October 1941
MARPLES, Roy	14 October 1941
BEARDSLEY, Robert A.	17 October 1941
WINSKILL, Archie L.	6 January 1942
FINLAY, Donald O.	10 April 1942
GLEN, Arthur A.	29 May 1942
GLEN, Arthur A. (Bar)	5 November 1943
BENHAM, Douglas I. (Bar)	8 May 1945
REID, Daniel J.	1 June 1945
COLEMAN, Patrick T.	24 July 1945
COWELL, Peter	24 July 1945
STEVENSON, Ian T.	24 July 1945
SHEPHERD, John B. (2nd Bar)	14 September 1945
PIXTON, George W.	17 January 1991
Distinguished Flying Medal	1
PALMER, Wilfred	17 October 1941
Military Medal	2
BRIFFAULT, H. Lister, Cpl Mech	15 July 1919
WOOD, James, AM2	15 July 1919
Mention in Despatches	5
CLAXTON, William G.	8 November 1918
KNOWLES, John W., Chf Mech	11 July 1919
O'CONNOR, Martin, Snr Mech	11 July 1919
SHIELDS, William E.	11 July 1919
LOCK, Eric S.	17 March 1941
Croix de Guerre (Belgium)	2
BOWMAN, Geoffrey H.	15 July 1919
MacLEOD, Malcolm P.	15 July 1919
Croix de Guerre (France)	2
GILLESPIE, William J. (with Palm)	22 August 1919
MARCHANT, Clarence H. (with Palm)	12 February 1918

=== Prisoners of War 1916–1918 & 1939–1945 ===
World War I		World War II	
Name	Date of Capture	Name	Date of Capture
BUCKNALL, Claude V.	5 October 1918	APPLETON, Arthur S.	18 December 1944
CARTER, Guy L.	8 August 1918	BREW, William A.	27 August 1941
CLARK, Frederick S.	29 October 1917	BULL, Alan L.	12 August 1941
CLATON, William G.	17 August 1918	CHAPMAN, Raymond	12 August 1941
COOKE, Philip B.	28 September 1918	DRAPER, Gilbert G. F.	7 August 1941
CRAWFORD, Charles	24 September 1918	GRAHAM, Peter B.	1 September 1944
DEANE, George S.	26 November 1916	HARDING, Ross P.	13 February 1945
DWYER, Neville Augustus	22 September 1918	HAYWOOD, Douglas	27 August 1943
FRASER, Andrew	3 May 1917	HENRY, David J. V.	10 February 1945
HAIGHT, John L.	28 September 1917	HIND, Peter	31 August 1941
HAIR, Norman B.	7 June 1917	HOARE, Reginald M.	1 April 1943
HALL, Ernest O. W	27 October 1918	PALMER, Wilfred	12 April 1942
HEWAT, Harry B.	28 September 1918	PARRY, Hugh L.	7 February 1944
ISBELL, Arthur T.	21 March 1918	PRICKETT, Leslie A.	17 December 1943
MacGOWN, John C.	7 July 1917	ROOD, Albert van	12 April 1942
MILANI, Rudolph S.	28 May 1918	SLACK, Thomas A. H.	23 August 1944
MITCHELL, William	28 September 1918	STAPLETON, William A.	1 June 1940
POWELL, Frederick J.	2 February 1918	STOK, Bram van der	12 April 1942
SMITH, A. F.	28 September 1918	TEBBIT, Donald F. J.	22 February 1945
STURGESS, Thomas M.	26 June 1917	WAGNER, Herbert A.	2 June 1944
TELFER, Harry C.	28 September 1918	WILLIAMS, Marx G.	18 August 1941

=== Escapers and evaders 1939–1945 ===
Name	Period	Details
WINSKILL, Archie L.	August–November 1941	Evaded and returned to UK
SLACK, Thomas A. H.	July–August 1943	Evaded and returned to UK
PRICKETT, Leslie A.	August–December 1943	Evaded for four months, but captured
MAY, Stanley H.	September–October 1943	Evaded and returned to UK
PARRY, Hugh L.	September 1943 – March 1944	Evaded for six months, but captured
STOK, Bram van der	March 1944	Escaped in 'Great Escape' & returned to UK

=== Guinea Pig Club members ===
Name	Date of Injury	Service on 41 Sqn
BENNIONS, George H.	1 October 1940	16 February 1936 – 1 October 1940
LANE, Roy	26 August 1940	6 April – ca 27 September 1943
LOCK, Eric S.	17 November 1940	18 June-17 November 1940
WHALE, F. Victor	11 December 1944	7 March 1945 – 12 February 1946
WOOLLARD, Frederick G.	18 July 1944	18 December 1943 – 18 July 1944

=== Roll of Honour 1916–2026 ===
Name	Nationality	Date	Name	Nationality	Date
1916–1919			1939–1945		
ALEXANDER, Thomas M.	British	17 August 1918	EAST, Walter R.	British	3 May 1943
ARBERY, Ernest E.	British	6 June 1917	FLEMING, Douglas	Canadian	23 November 1941
BAILEY, Louis J.	British	17 June 1917	GAMBLEN, Douglas R.	British	29 July 1940
BARWELL, Humphrey E.	British	3 February 1918	GARVEY, Leonard A.	British	30 October 1940
BROWNING, Stanley F.	British	3 May 1917	GAUNCE, Lionel M.	Canadian	19 November 1941
BUSH, John S. de L.	British	25 August 1917	GILDERS, John S.	British	21 February 1941
CHAPMAN, Alfred J.	British	18 September 1917	GILLITT, Frank N.	British	22 October 1942
CHIPCHASE, Benjamin	British	20 March 1918	GOODALL, Bernard B.	New Zealander	15 August 1942
CODY, Samuel F. L.	British	23 January 1917	GRAY, James A. B.	British	3 October 1943
DOUGLAS, Frederick W.	Canadian	12 August 1918	HARRIS, Albert	British	18 October 1939
ECCLES, Charley G.	British	25 May 1917	HARRISON, Ronald	British	22 October 1942
EDWARDS, Arthur W.	British	10 October 1917	HIND, Peter	British	8 July 1942
FRASER, Alistair H.	British	11 August 1918	HOGARTH, Rycherde H. W.	South African	18 July 1943
GORDON, John A.	Canadian	12 August 1918	HOGG, Ralph V.	British	10 December 1940
HOLMAN, Gerald C.	British	17 September 1917	HOOD, Hilary R. L.	British	5 September 1940
JACKSON, Harold	British	7 June 1917	HUNT, Leonard	British	16 September 1941
JONES, Harold E.	British	22 November 1917	HYDE, Geoffrey C.	British	19 August 1942
MacGREGOR, Donald A. D. I.	British	30 November 1917	JENKIN, Thomas E.	British	5 May 1942
MARTIN, Frederick W. H.	Canadian	9 August 1918	JONES, Horace	British	18 October 1939
McARDLE, Hugh F.	British	18 September 1917	JURY, Richard D.	British	18 August 1941
McCONE, John P.	Canadian	24 March 1918	LANGLEY, Gerald A.	British	15 September 1940
MITCHELL, William	British	10 October 1918	LECKY, John G.	British	11 October 1940
MORRIS, Walter A.	British	2 October 1918	LEGARD, William E.	British	1 June 1940
NICHOLLS, Edward C. H. R.	British	20 September 1918	LLOYD, Philip D.	British	15 October 1940
O'LONGAN, Paul C. S.	Irish	1 June 1917	McADAM, John	British	20 February 1941
PAYNE, Hubert	British	4 January 1917	MORGAN, Harry P. D.	British	27 August 1941
PERKINS, Thorold	British	31 May 1917	MOTTERSHEAD, Clifford H.	British	2 March 1945
PINK, Alan L.	British	30 October 1918	MURRIN, Wilfred F.	British	18 May 1943
STANLEY, Frederick	British	26 October 1917	ODDY, Clifford	British	17 July 1944
SWANN, Gerald H.	British	18 October 1917	O'NEILL, Desmond H.	Irish	11 October 1940
TAYLOR, Robert E.	Canadian	17 September 1917	OVERALL, Horace E. H.	Canadian	6 November 1939
THOMPSON, William G.	British	14 July 1917	OXENHAM, Russel E. G.	British	24 September 1942
TOOMS, Cecil S.	British	24 January 1917	POYNTON, T. Rex	Zululand	23 April 1943
TRIMBLE, Alan V.	British	25 August 1918	ROBINSON, Kenneth B.	Irish	7 June 1944
TUCKER, Donald C.	British	24 March 1918	SCOTT, Thomas R.	British	22 October 1942
TURNBULL, John S.	British	17 June 1918	SCOTT, William J. M.	British	8 September 1940
WEISS, Edward S.	British	22 November 1917	SHEA, David J.	Canadian	13 March 1944
WHITEHEAD, Reginald M.	British	22 November 1917	SHEPHERD, John B.	British	22 January 1946
WINNICOTT, Russell	British	6 December 1917	SHORT, Roger L.	British	17 July 1944
			THOMAS, John I.	British	24 April 1943
1923–1939			VALIQUET, Charles N.	Canadian	9 May 1942
			VAN GOENS, Ryklof	Dutch	17 August 1944
ADDAMS, Anthony C.	British	16 June 1926	VINCENT, Arthur	British	18 October 1939
ALLDAY, Francis	British	9 June 1936	VYKOUKAL, Karel J.	Czech	21 May 1942
BAILEY, Allan S.	British	9 June 1936	WAINWRIGHT, Derek W.	British	10 June 1942
BAKER, Frank	British	18 May 1934	WATTS, Edward G. H.	British	12 April 1942
BRADBURY, Geoffrey	British	20 May 1928	WEBSTER, J. Terence	British	5 September 1940
MITCHELL, Kenneth	British	18 July 1939	WHITEFORD, Cyril J. L.	Rhodesian	13 October 1941
ST. GEORGE-TAYLOR, Harold	British	9 October 1924			
SAWYER, Wilfred	British	6 August 1930	1946–present		
SERJEANT, George V.	British	16 March 1939			
SLOWEY, Henry E.	New Zealander	23 August 1932	SHEPHERD, John B.	Canadian	22 January 1946
VAUGHAN-FOWLER, Denis G.	British	7 August 1931	WILKINSON, Frank A.	British	16 April 1948
			ROBINSON, Thomas	British	15 August 1949
1939–1946			McDONALD, Gordon A.	British	18 June 1951
			BRANTHWAITE, John	British	19 August 1951
ALLAN, Reginald C.	Australian	20 July 1942	BANGS, Peter R.	British	19 August 1951
ALLEN, John J.	Australian	20 June 1942	MUNROE, John P. J.	British	17 April 1956
ANGUS, Robert A.	British	20 February 1941	COULSTON, Roger T.	British	13 October 1956
BACHE, Leslie L.	British	13 October 1941	TAYLOR, Earl	American	11 July 1958
BALASSE, Maurice A. L.	Belgian	23 January 1945	HATCH, John L.	British	29 August 1961
BEDNARZ, Jozef	Polish	1 February 1943	NORTHALL, John C. P.	British	29 August 1961
BLITZ, Morris	British	13 October 1940	WATSON, Robert	British	23 August 1967
BODKIN, W. Fred	Canadian	28 August 1941	KIRKLAND, Terence W.	British	9 August 1974
BOYD, Robert J.	British	6 September 1943	JELLICOE, Brian A.	British	17 December 1975
BOYLE, John G.	Canadian	28 September 1940	TENNET, H. Keith	British	17 December 1975
BRIGGS, Michael F.	British	2 April 1941	ROE, Brian	British	21 May 1983
CHALDER, Harry H.	British	10 November 1940	MESSENGER, Michael J.	British	21 May 1983
CHATTIN, Peter W.	British	3 September 1944	ARMSTRONG, Paul T.	British	21 May 1983
COPE, Arthur R.	Australian	9 March 1943	SWASH, Derrick	British	21 May 1983
COPLEY, John J. H.	British	14 September 1939	WINSHIP, Stuart	British	21 May 1983
CROKER, Eric E.	New Zealander	2 June 1941	MANNHEIM, Andrew S.	British	17 June 1987
DUNSTAN, Bruce P.	British	12 February 1942	NOBLE, Greg	British	23 January 1996

== See also ==
- List of RAF squadrons
