= John Fraser Drummond =

British fighter pilot (1918–1940)

- John Fraser Drummond
- Born: 19 October 1918; Liverpool, England
- Died: 10 October 1940 (aged 21); Portslade, Sussex, England
- Burial place: Thornton, Liverpool
- Military career
- Allegiance: United Kingdom
- Branch: Royal Air Force
- Service years: 1938–1940
- Rank: Flying Officer
- Service number: 40810
- Units: No. 46 Squadron; No. 92 Squadron
- Conflicts: Second World War: Battle of Britain †
- Awards: Distinguished Flying Cross

John Fraser Drummond, DFC (19 October 1918 – 10 October 1940) was a fighter pilot and flying ace who flew with the Royal Air Force during the Second World War. He was killed after his aircraft collided with another during the Battle of Britain.

== Background ==
The younger of two siblings, he was born to middle-class parents, William and Nellie, in Liverpool on 19 October 1918. From the age of eleven he attended boarding schools (Deytheur Grammar School in Llansantffraid, Powys, then Wellington School, Somerset).

A capable student, he passed his school certificates in a wide range of subjects and left with the senior prize for divinity.

After a short spell working at a timber merchant with his father, he applied to join the RAF.

== RAF career ==
He passed his medical in November 1937 and began training in April 1938. He was granted a short service commission as an acting pilot officer on probation with effect from 4 June 1938. In January 1939 he was assigned to 46 Squadron based at RAF Digby in Lincolnshire. He flew the Gloster Gauntlet briefly before the squadron was re-equipped with Hurricanes. On 4 April 1939 he was confirmed as a pilot officer.

On 21 October 1939 the squadron attacked a formation of Heinkel 115s – an action which prompted a visit from the king a fortnight later. The squadron spent most of the next six months in training.

=== Norway ===
After the German invasion of Norway on 9 April, No. 46 Squadron was part of the British air forces sent to Norway. They sailed on HMS Glorious and by 27 May 1940 were stationed in Bardufoss in the far north of the country.

On 29 May flying Hurricane L1794 Drummond saw four enemy aircraft and attacked a Heinkel He 111 of Kampfgeschwader 26. Although Drummond hit the starboard engine he was hit in turn by return fire, causing his cockpit to fill with smoke. He turned to return to Bardufoss but his engine failed. Bailing out, he landed in the freezing waters of Ofotfjord and was rescued by HMS Firedrake.

On 2 June he was patrolling in Hurricane W2543 over Narvik. He saw two Junkers Ju 87s attacking a destroyer over Ofotfjord. He shot down one of them, watching it force-land and burst into flames.

On 7 June he was in the air at 04.00 when he saw three He 111s. He attacked the two, hitting one that he last saw flying damaged towards the Swedish border, claiming this as a victory.

That same afternoon he attacked a formation of four He 111s. He claimed one downed and damaged two more, but again was hit by return fire, piercing the windscreen, clipping his goggles and helmet before ricocheting out of the cockpit hood.

The British evacuation of Norway, Operation Alphabet began the same day. Unlike the other squadron pilots, he did not fly his Hurricane to the aircraft carrier Glorious but instead returned with the ground crew component on SS Arandora Star. This was fortuitous for him, as Glorious was sunk on the return journey, killing eight of Drummond's fellow Hurricane pilots.

For his service in Norway Drummond was awarded the Distinguished Flying Cross on 26 July 1940 with a citation that mentioned that last day's exploits in detail.

Citation from the London Gazette:

Pilot Officer John Fraser DRUMMOND (40810). During operations in Norway, this officer shot down two enemy aircraft and seriously damaged a further three. On one occasion, as pilot of one of two Hurricanes which attacked four Heinkel Ill's, he damaged one of the enemy aircraft and then engaged two of the others. Despite heavy return fire, Pilot Officer Drummond pressed home his attack, silenced the rear guns of both aircraft and compelled the Heinkels to break off the engagement.

For the next ten weeks he flew convoy and defensive patrols and trained Polish and Czech pilots to fly Spitfires at RAF Hawarden.

=== No. 92 Squadron and the Battle of Britain ===
On 5 September he was posted to 92 Squadron, serving with several legendary pilots including Bob Stanford Tuck, Brian Kingcome, Allan Wright and Geoffrey Wellum. He had been promoted flying officer on 3 September 1940.

Drummond first saw action on 9 September, defending an attack on Biggin Hill. On 11 September Drummond attacked a Messerschmitt Bf 109 that was attacking a Hurricane, following it until he ran out of ammunition. He saw two more Bf 109s about to attack him, but managed to half-roll and return to base safely.

Throughout September Drummond and 92 Squadron were involved in sporadic sorties to defend south eastern England. Meanwhile, the Luftwaffe began The Blitz on major cities. On 21 September a bomb smashed into a Drummond family home in Liverpool, killing John's grandmother and aunt while they slept.

On the morning of 23 September, flying Spitfire QJ-T (X4422), Drummond attacked a Bf 109 attacking another Spitfire. Feldwebel Kuepper of 8./Jagdgeschwader 26 tried to escape but Drummond pressed home his attack, firing short bursts until Kuepper was forced down in a pond near Grain Fort on the Isle of Grain and captured unhurt.

The next day 92 Squadron intercepted an incoming raid over the Thames estuary. Fighting through the Bf 109 fighter escort they attacked the Ju 88 bombers. Having damaged one, Drummond pulled away chased by three Bf 109s. He turned circle, attacking and damaging two of them, arriving safely back at Biggin Hill.

On 5 October he took off a few minutes after the rest of the squadron. Before he could catch up, he saw twelve Bf 109s over Dungeness and launched a solo attack. He fired on the rear fighter, hit it then watched it crash in the sea. He then attacked a Henschel Hs 126 of 4 (H)/31 flying low over the water, finally bringing it down two miles from the French coast. Its pilot, Leutnant Klaeden, was taken prisoner.

During the Battle RAF artist Cuthbert Orde drew his portrait. Out of the 3,000 or so pilots in Fighter Command, less than 200 of the most noteworthy had been selected for a study in Orde's iconic style.

=== Death ===
On the morning of 10 October 1940, Drummond was part of a patrol east of Brighton. A Dornier Do 17 was intercepted and all 9 Spitfires of the patrol descended on it. They were hindered by iced-up windscreens that prevented them from using their deflector sights.

Drummond and Pilot Officer Bill Williams both attempted beam attacks from either flank. They missed and continued turning towards each other, and their Spitfires collided. Drummond baled out but was too low for his parachute to open effectively. Still alive after hitting the ground, a priest was able to administer the last rites before Drummond died in his arms.

His Spitfire, R6616 crashed close by, landing on a flintstone wall that bordered Jubilee Field (now Easthill Drive) and St Mary's Convent in Portslade. When his body was examined, Drummond was found to have been wounded in his left arm and leg. Bill Williams, it later transpired, had been shot through the head so was already dead when the planes collided.

During the war Drummond had claimed 8 aircraft destroyed (and 1 shared), 3 'probables' and 4 damaged.

== Funeral and memorials ==
Drummond's funeral took place at St Michael's church, Blundellsands, Liverpool, on 15 October 1940, four days before his 22nd birthday. He is buried in Thornton Garden of Rest.

John Drummond is commemorated on the Battle of Britain Memorial, Capel-le-Ferne, and the Battle of Britain Monument in London. His name is on two memorials in his home district of Crosby. One is inside St Michael's church where his funeral was held, the other in Alexandra Park.

He is listed in the book of remembrance at St Clement Danes, the RAF church in London. He is also recorded in the book of remembrance, the casualties list and on the roll of honour in St Georges Chapel at Biggin Hill. There is also a plaque at Wellington School commemorating John Drummond and another old boy who flew in the Battle of Britain, Edward Graham.

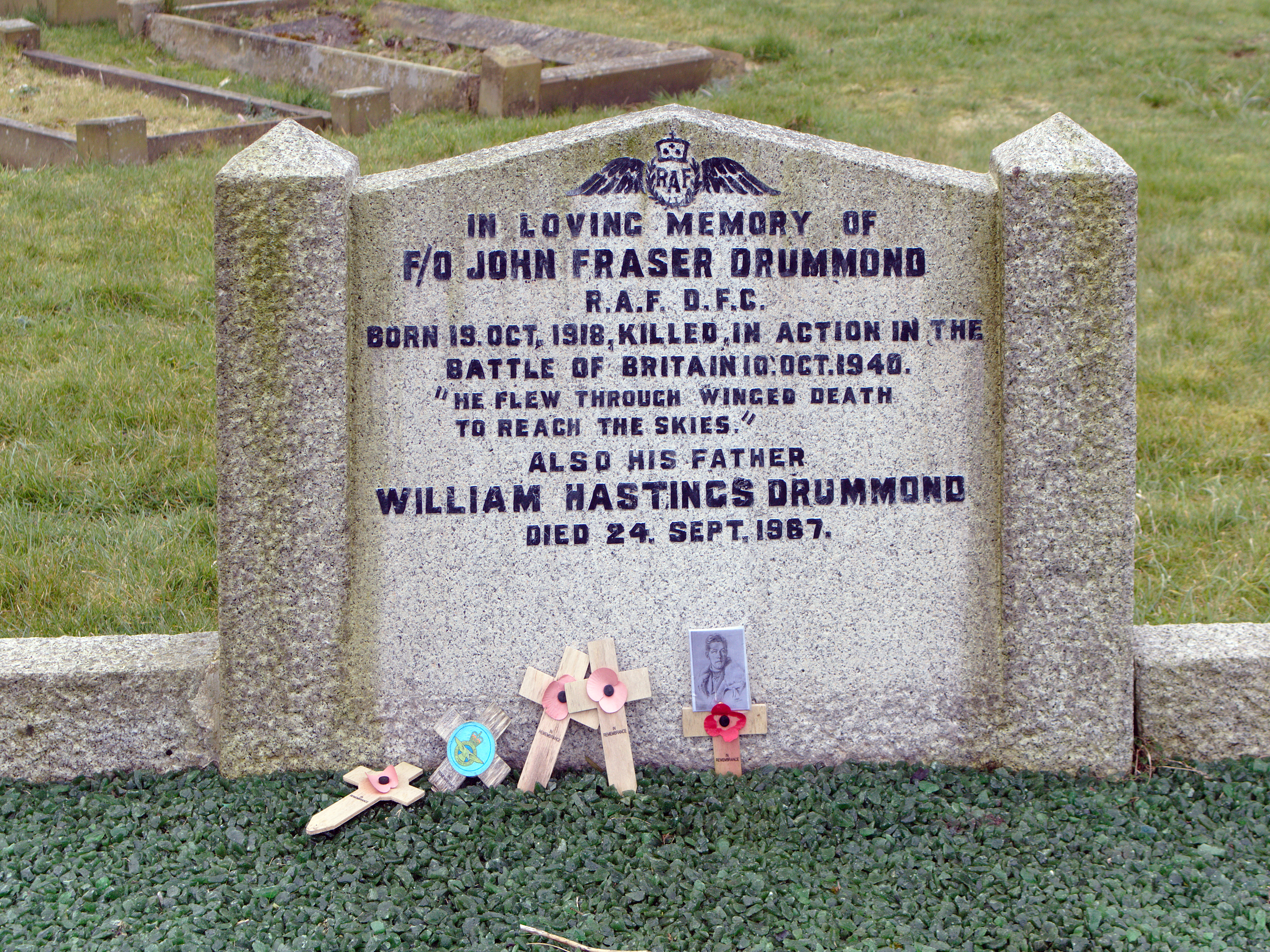
Gravestone in Thornton Garden of Rest

== First Light ==
Geoffrey Wellum's best-selling memoir, First Light, mentions Drummond. In 2010 it was dramatised for TV by the BBC, with Alex Waldmann playing John Fraser Drummond.

== Combat Record 1940 ==
Date	Flying	Location	Kills	Probables	Damaged
29 May	Hurricane I L1794	Narvik	1 * Heinkel He 111		
2 June	Hurricane I N2543	SE Narvik	1 * Junkers Ju 87		
7 June	Hurricane I L1793	2m N Narvik	1 * Heinkel He 111		
7 June	Hurricane I L1805	10m E Narvik	1 * Heinkel He 111		2 * Heinkel He 111
11 Sept	Spitfire I N3248	10m NW Dungeness		1 * Messerschmitt Bf 109	
23 Sept	Spitfire I X4422	Tonbridge – N Chatham	1 * Messerschmitt Bf 109E		
24 Sept	Spitfire I X4422	Maidstone area		1 * Messerschmitt Bf 109E	1 * Messerschmitt Bf 109E; 1 * Junkers Ju 88
27 Sept	Spitfire I X4330	Sevenoaks – S Westerham	0.3 * Messerschmitt Bf 110		
27 Sept	Spitfire I X4487	1m from High Halden	1 * Junkers Ju 88		
30 Sept	Spitfire I X4051	Brighton		1* Messerschmitt Bf 110	
5 Oct	Spitfire I	Dungeness	1 * Messerschmitt Bf 109E; 1 * Henschel Hs 126		
TOTAL			8 kills, 1 shared	3 probables	4 damaged

(Sources for all combat record: Aces High – A Tribute to the Most Notable Fighter Pilots of the British and Commonwealth Forces in WWII and Aces High Volume 2 and 92 Squadron Operations Record Book)
