= Cuthbert Orde =

British pilot and artist

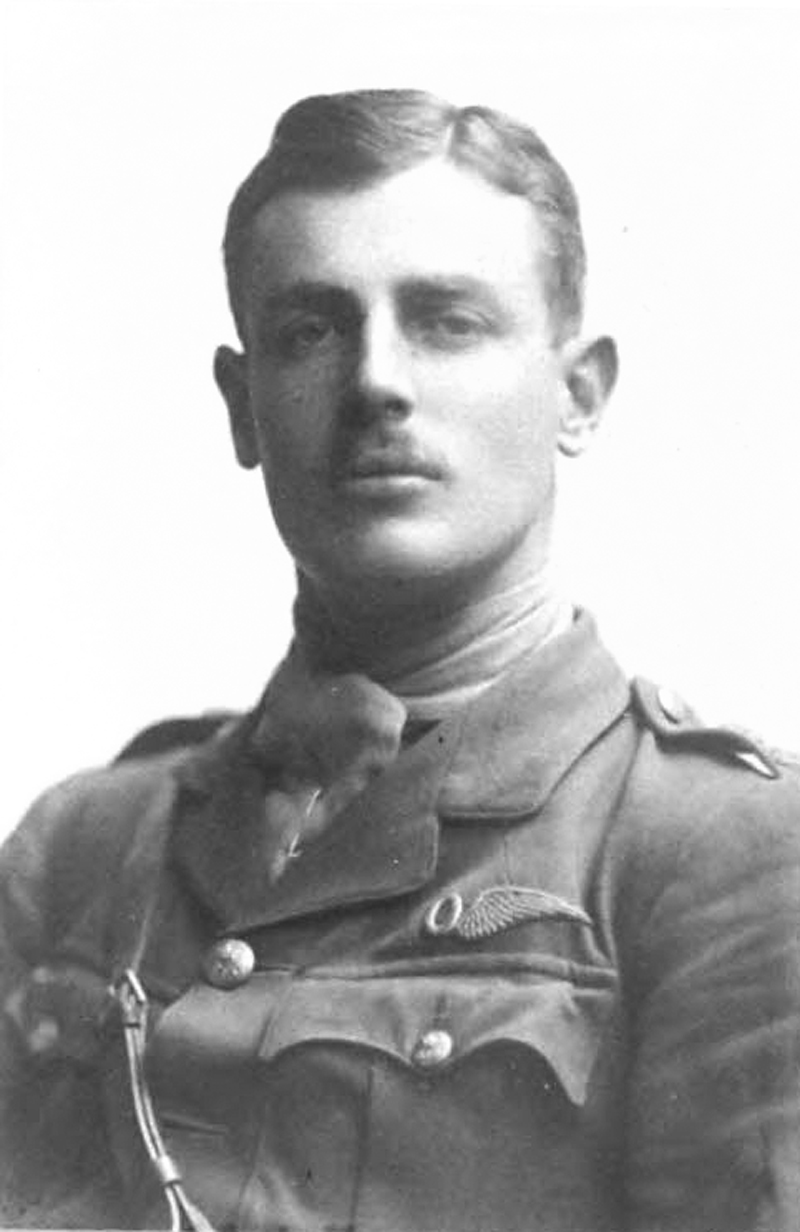
- Cuthbert Orde in Royal Flying Corps uniform, 1916
- Born: 18 December 1888; Great Yarmouth, Norfolk, England
- Died: 19 December 1968 (aged 80); London, England
- Education: Framlingham College
- Notable work: Bombing up a Wellington; Roland Stanford Tuck 1916-1987
- Style: Illustration
- Spouses: Lady Eileen Wellesley (m. 1887; died 1952) Alexandra Dalziel (m. 1953)
- Military career
- Allegiance: United Kingdom
- Service: Army Service Corps (1914–1916); Royal Flying Corps (1916–1919)
- Enlisted: 1914–1919
- Rank: Lieutenant (Army); Captain (Flying Corp)
- Wars: First World War
- Awards: 1914 Star
- Other work: Artist

Captain Cuthbert Julian Orde (18 December 1888 – 19 December 1968) was an artist and First World War pilot. He is best known for his war art, especially his portraits of Allied Battle of Britain pilots.

== Family background ==
Orde was born on 18 December 1888 in Great Yarmouth, Norfolk, the second of five children. He attended Framlingham College 1902–07.

His parents were Sir Julian Walter Orde and Alice Georgiana Orde of Hopton House, Hopton, Norfolk.

Sir Julian was the long-serving – from at least 1903 until 1914 – Secretary of the Automobile Car Club of Britain and Ireland (which became the Royal Automobile Club). In response to the Motor Car Act 1903 raising the speed limit to a mere 20 mph, in 1904 he went to the Isle of Man where, with permission of his cousin the Governor, he started the TT races. He was also an early member of the Royal Aero Club of the United Kingdom, serving on its committees as early as 1909. This may have inspired his sons to join the Royal Flying Corps.

The family had a strong military tradition going back several centuries. Orde's great-grandfather was Major-General James Orde.

== Military career ==
Orde served throughout the First World War, starting by becoming a second lieutenant in the Army Service Corps on 15 August 1914.

He was a lieutenant when he qualified as a pilot for the Royal Flying Corps in a Maurice Farman biplane on 10 May 1916. Accordingly, on 10 June 1916 he was promoted from Flying Officer (Observer) to Flying Officer.

On 1 August 1917 he was promoted to flight commander. Because he had served in the early part of the war, he was awarded the 1914 Star. He was a captain by time of his application for the medal in December 1917. His home address for delivery of the medal was given as Apsley House, Piccadilly – his father-in-law's house on Hyde Park Corner; Orde had married Lady Eileen Wellesley daughter of Arthur Wellesley, 4th Duke of Wellington, in 1916.

He was given the rank of temporary major on 16 August 1918. He relinquished his commission on 15 January 1919 on grounds of ill health, and retained the rank of captain.

Both of Orde's brothers served in the war, and both died in a five-year period.

His younger brother Herbert Walter Julian Orde joined the navy before the war. An episode of bravery aboard HMS Helmuth in November 1914 saw him awarded the Distinguished Service Cross in April 1915. He died a month later when HMS Goliath was torpedoed off the Dardanelles.

Their elder brother Michael Amyas Julian Orde – like Cuthbert a second lieutenant in the Army Service Corps – qualified as a pilot a few months before Orde, on 27 Oct 1915. He was shot down and listed as missing on 14 March 1916. He was taken prisoner and held until the end of the war. He died on 6 August 1920 in a flying accident on Salisbury Plain. He was 32.

== Artistic career ==
Throughout his life Orde strongly identified himself as an artist. In the early 1920s he had a painting studio in Paris. His entries in phone directories for forty years – from 1929 up to his death in 1968 – list him as him "Orde, Cuthbert; Artist".

In his book Pilots of Fighter Command: Sixty Four Portraits, Orde wrote an essay explaining the circumstances of his portraits of World War II pilots.

Having been hired to produce illustrations of bomber stations in the summer of 1940, Air Commodore Harald Peake from the Air Ministry saw some of Orde's drawings and was impressed by his portraiture. It was the height of the Battle of Britain and public attention was focused on the fighter pilots. Peake asked Orde to make a large number of portraits of them, Orde enthusiastically agreed, and at the start of September set off to work.

It is unclear how many portraits he drew in the year or so with RAF Fighter Command. Some sources say up to 300, though Orde only lists 160 in his book Pilots of Fighter Command. What is clear is that he only drew a small fraction of "The Few".

In no case did I choose the sitter myself. He was selected either by Group Headquarters or by the station commander and, generally speaking, four or five in each squadron were chosen, the four or five who were considered the most valuable. So it was for them rather in the nature of a mention in dispatches, I merely being the scribe who wrote out the dispatch.

Taking around two hours per picture, Orde drew men whose names have become familiar to those interested in the history of the Battle; Douglas Bader, Sailor Malan, Robert Stanford Tuck, Johnnie Johnson, Archie McKellar, John Freeborn. He usually created monochrome pictures of the men using charcoal and white chalk, though some colour portraits were painted, such as that of Bob Stanford Tuck and a second portrait of Sailor Malan.

In drawing the cream of the pilots, names and uniforms soon became out of date as subjects were promoted and decorated. On finishing his drawing of Hugh Dundas, Orde joked, "I've left room for the DFC. The people I draw always seem to get it." Four days later Dundas did.

The daily peril of these men's lives was apparent. Orde states that some choices were killed before he had chance to draw them. Many did not live much longer after their portrait was done. John Drummond was drawn on 5 October 1940, shortly after landing from what turned out to be his final kill, and is pictured still in his aviator jacket instead of the uniformed outfit Orde commonly depicted. He died five days later. However, having flown in combat himself and lost both his brothers in military incidents twenty years earlier, the proximity of death will not have been new to Orde.

Although all the pilots were lauded, Orde was clear that there was an elite among them.

I think a squadron of pilots can be divided into three groups: natural leaders and fighters at the top; then the main body of solid talent containing the germ of leaders of the future, chaps whose qualities will develop with experience; and then I suppose the tail, two or three perhaps, who will never be quite good enough to earn distinction but who nevertheless are pulling their weight for all it may be worth.

Despite this, he was adamant that the airmen's extraordinary deeds were the doings of ordinary people.

I have often been asked if I have found a definite type of Fighter pilot... I have thought about this a lot, but I feel sure that the answer is "No"... The most striking thing about the Fighter pilots – "operational Fighter pilots", grand title that, isn't it? – is their ordinariness. Just "You, I, Us and Co.", ordinary sons of ordinary parents from ordinary homes. So when you wonder where they come from, dear reader, whoever you may be, contemplate your own home, your profession and your background, and you have the answer. You have everything in common with them, or at least I hope you have, for they are just people who read the poster that reads "It all depends on YOU". They are not a race apart.

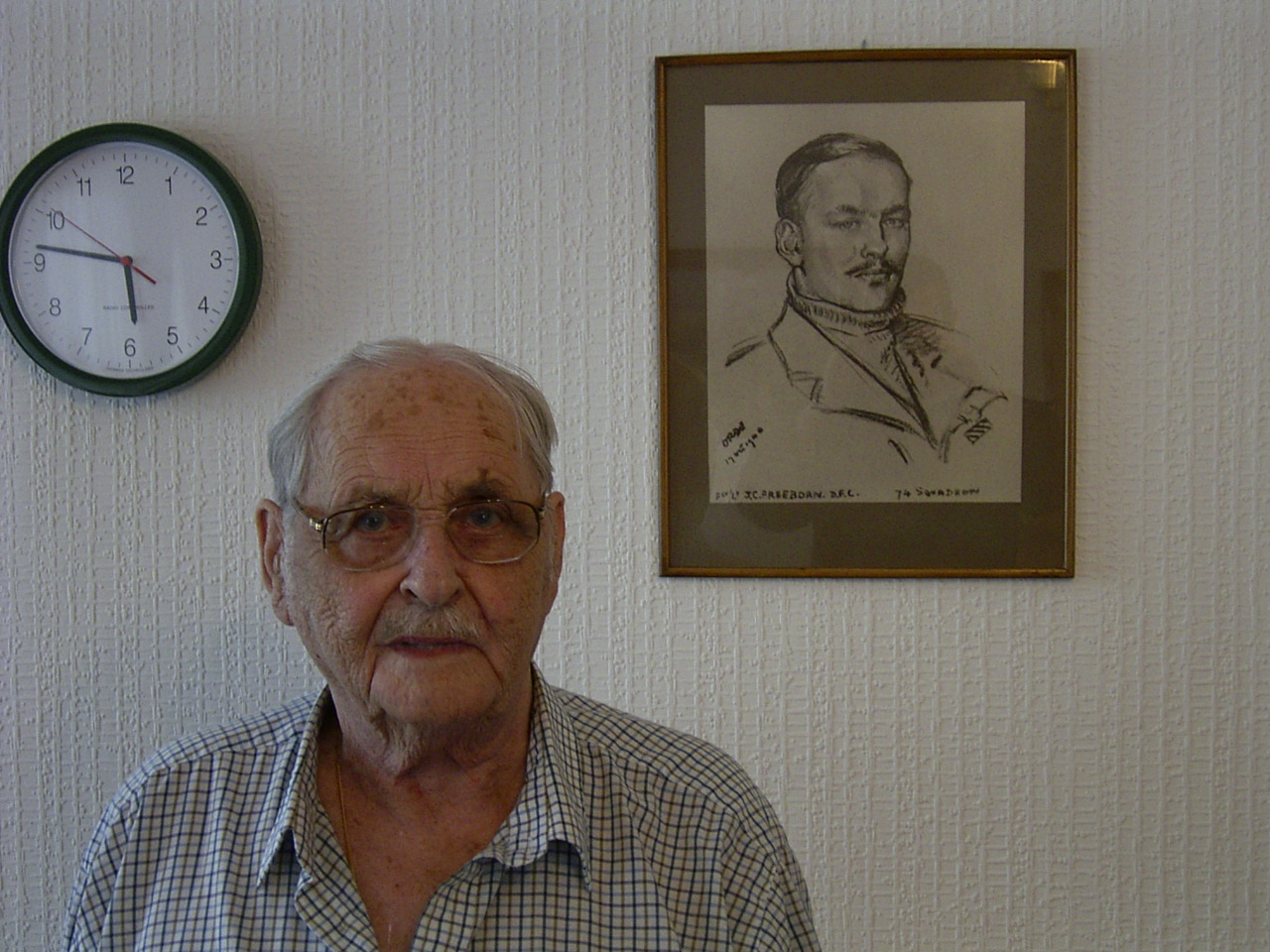
John Freeborn DFC* in front of his portrait by Cuthbert Orde, 2004

The drawings had already appeared in magazines even before the book was published, and have been continually reprinted in a wide variety of publications ever since.

Orde remained a professional artist, and was still taking commissions for military portraits long after the war, such as one of Air Chief Marshal Sir James Robb in 1958.

He was an inaugural painter-member of the Society of Aviation Artists, formed in 1955. In 1962 a book review in Flight magazine declared, "Cuthbert Orde...whom no-one has managed to convey more effectively the character and courage of RAF fighter pilots". His work was also part of the painting event in the art competition at the 1932 Summer Olympics.

== Selection of World War II portraits ==
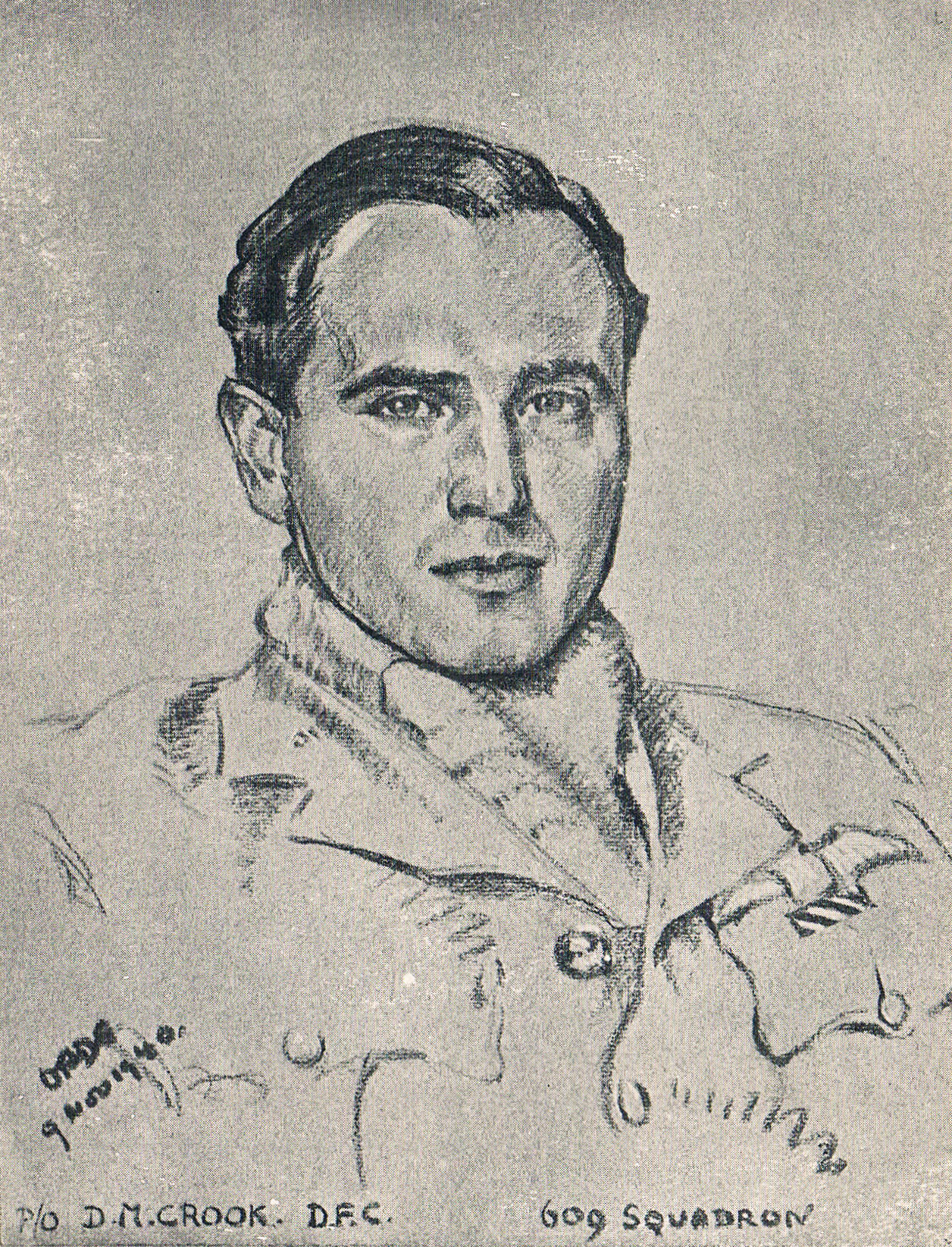
David Moore Crook, 1940

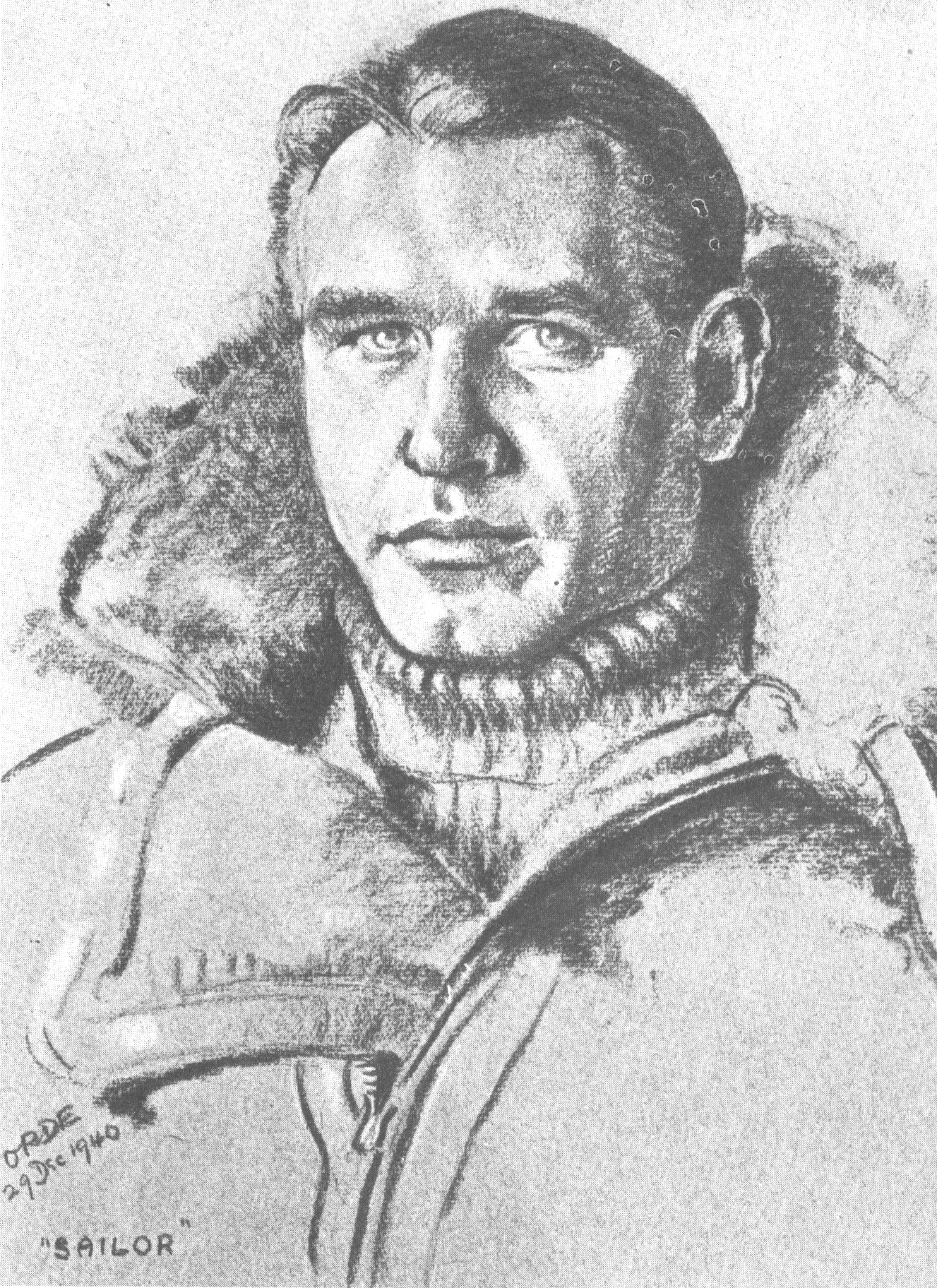
Sailor Malan, 1940

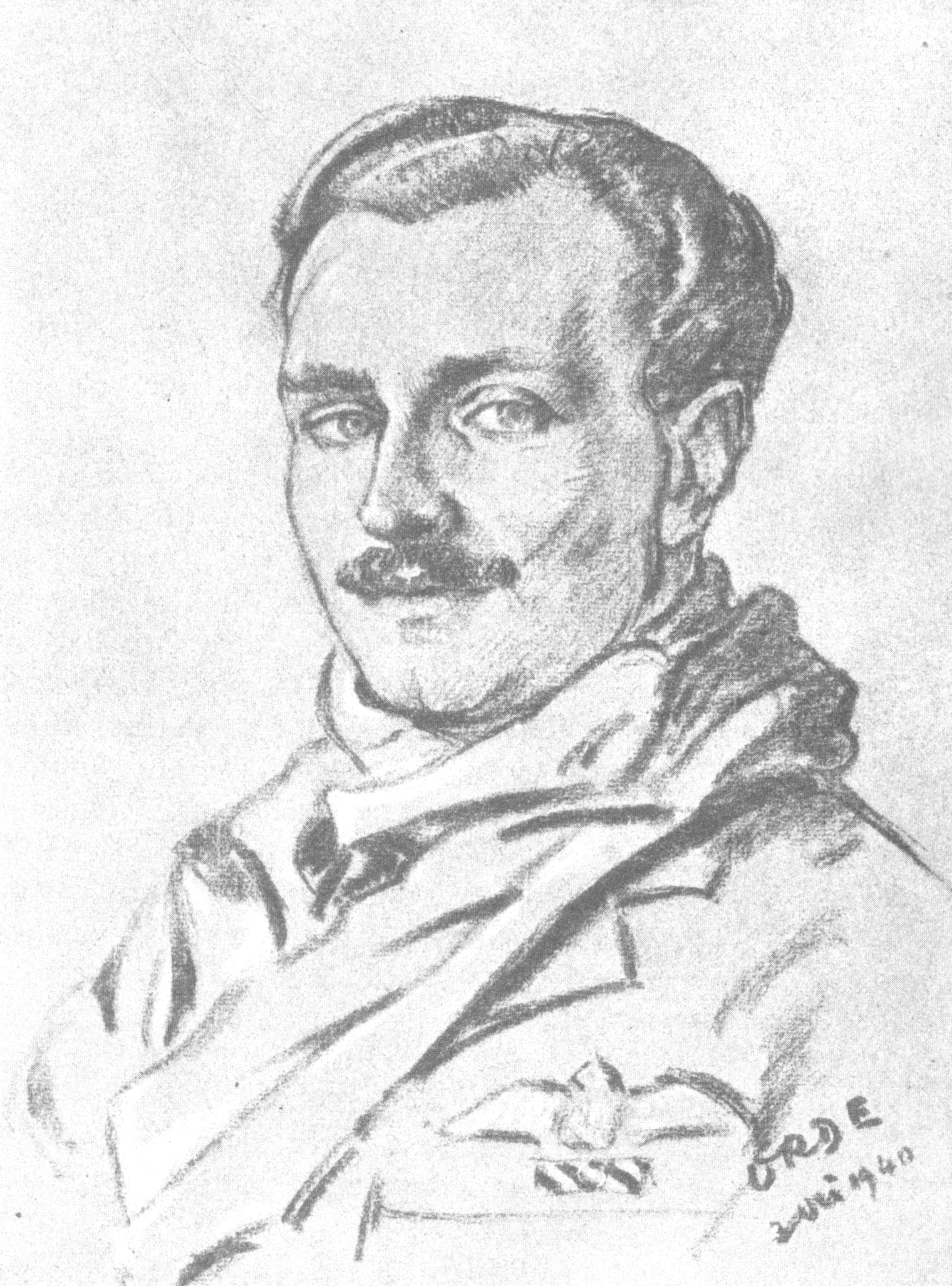
Archie McKellar, 1940

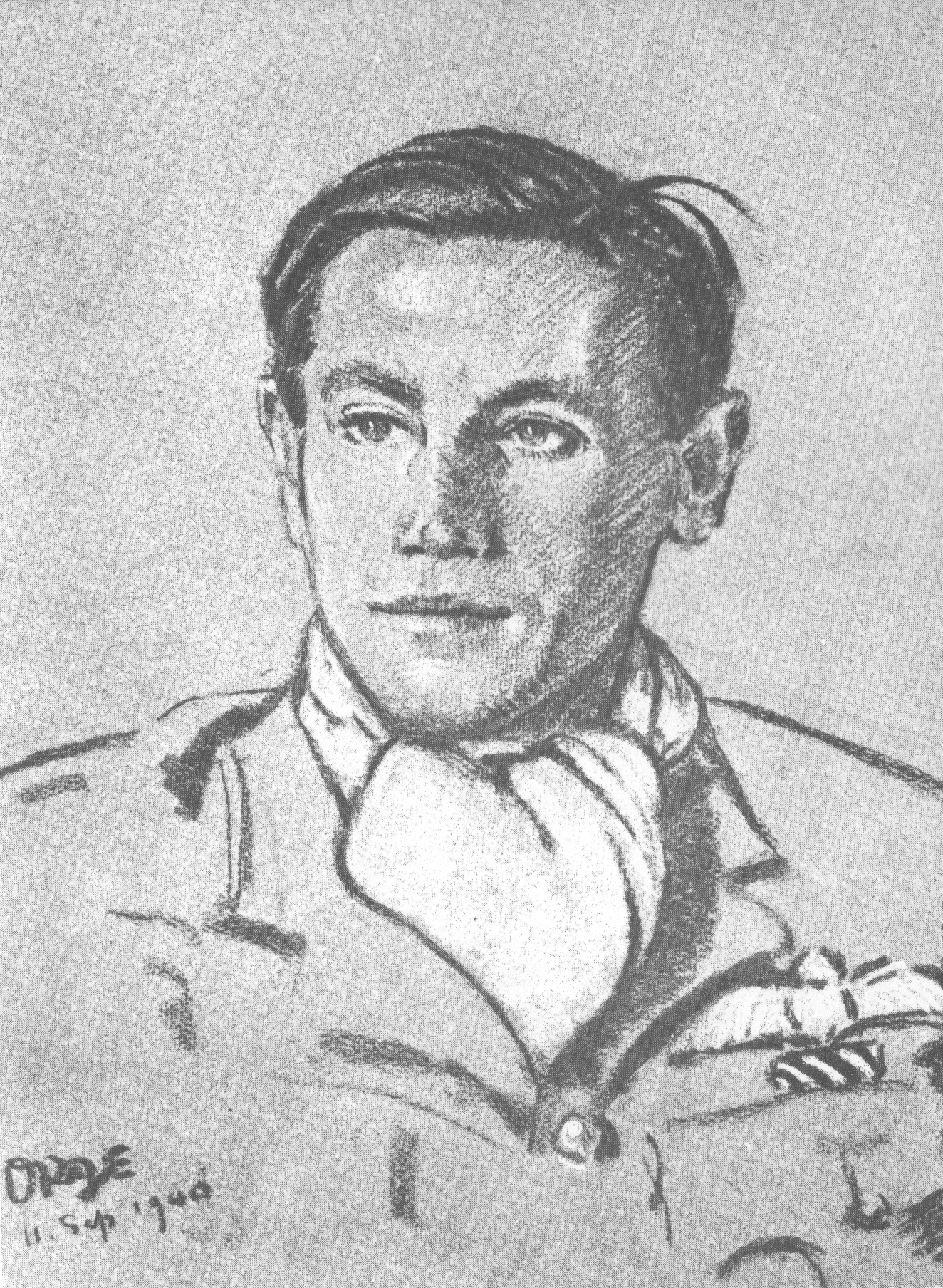
Harold Bird-Wilson, 1940

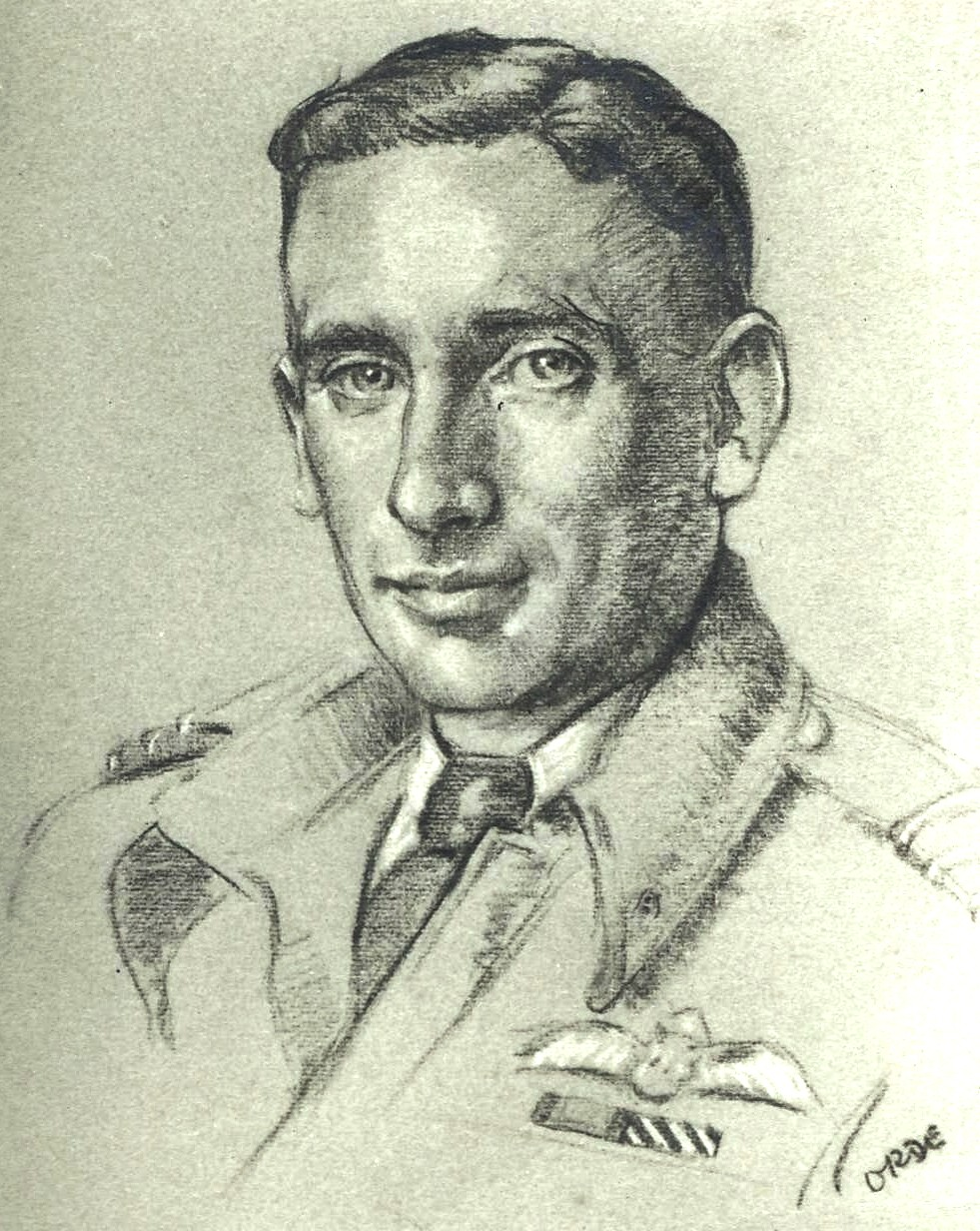
Walter Churchill, c1941

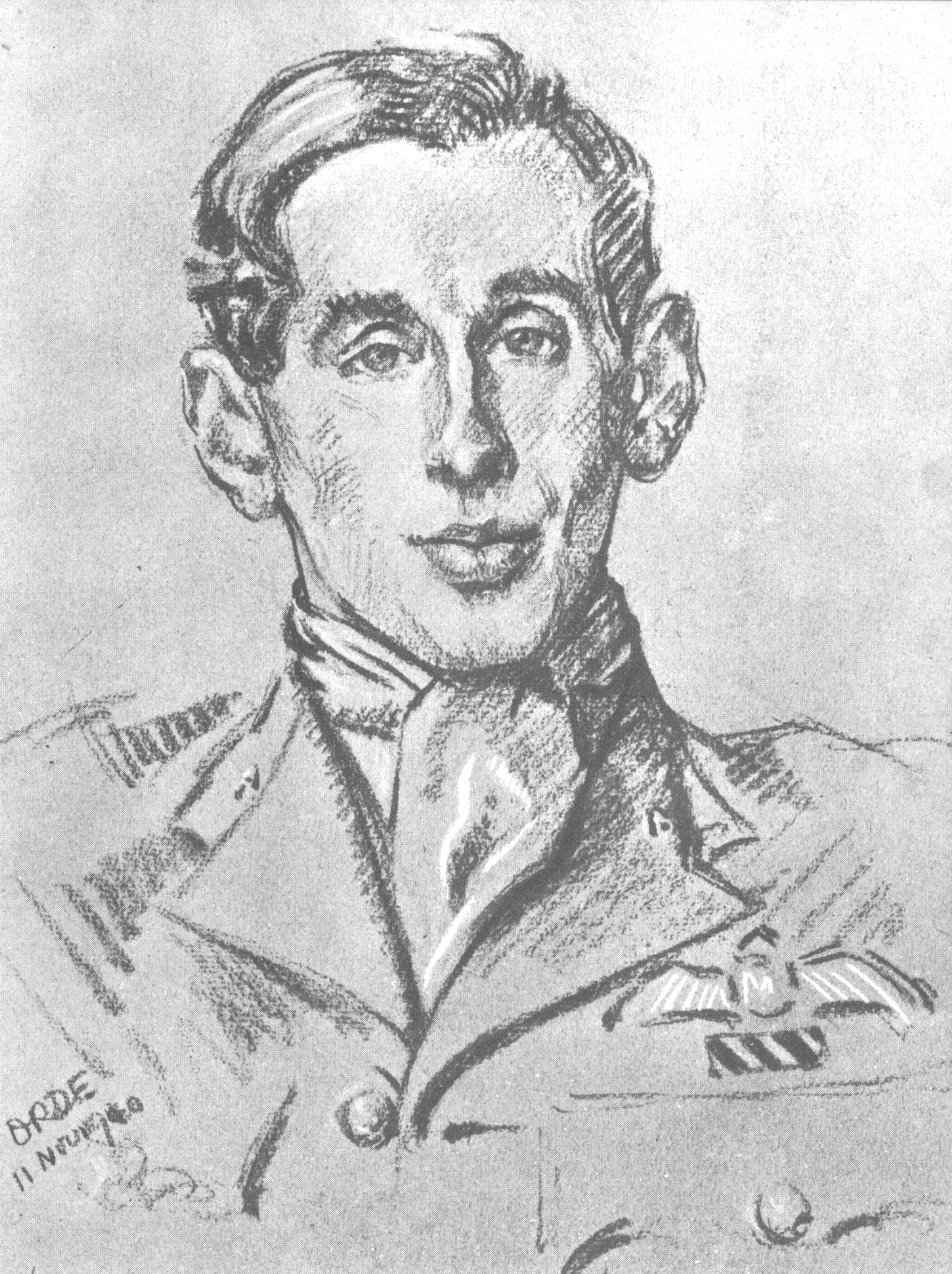
John Dundas (ace), 1940

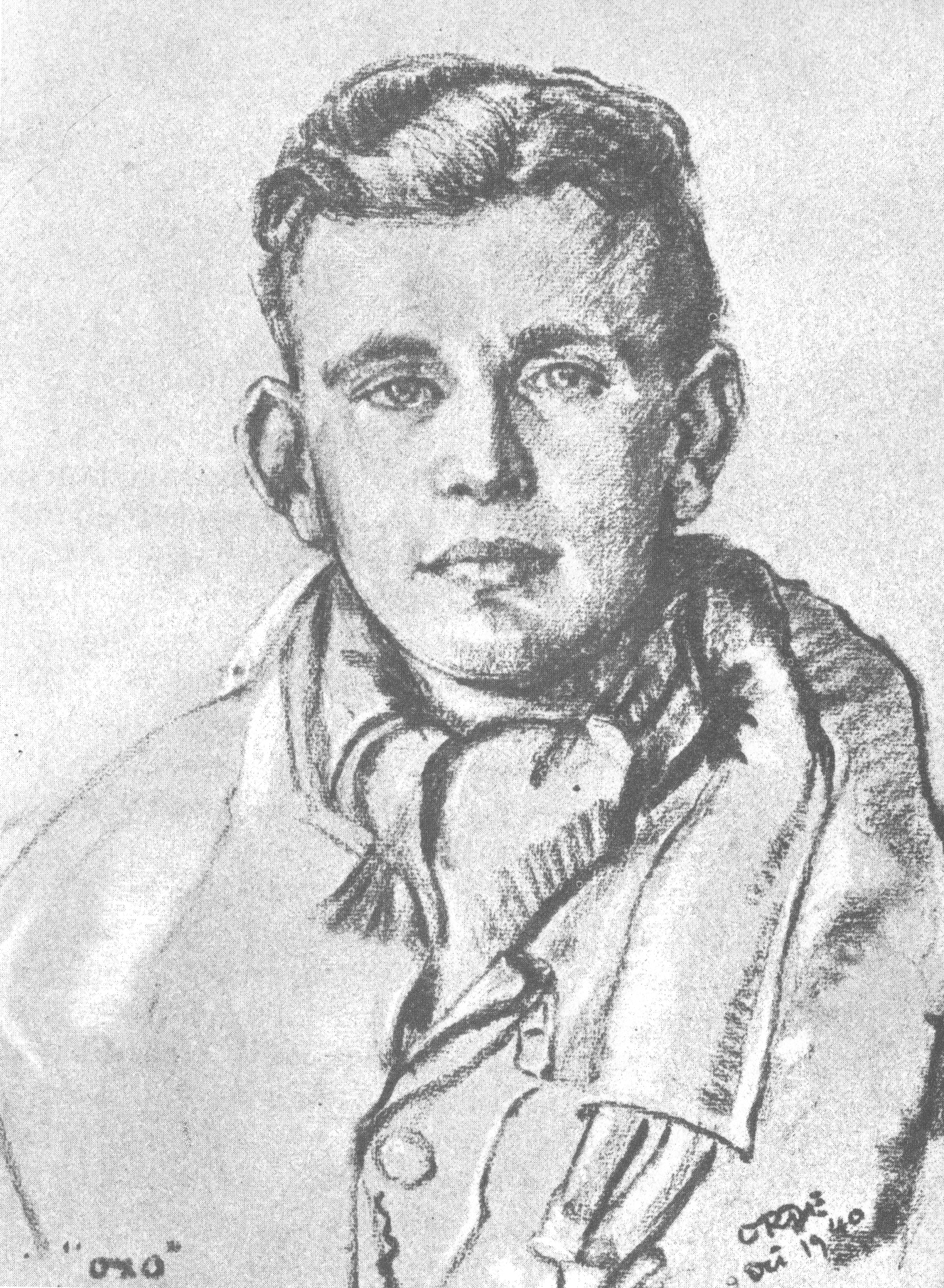
Bobby Oxspring, 1940

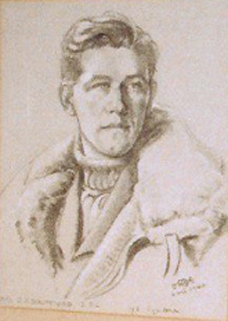
John Drummond, 1940

John Mungo-Park, 1940

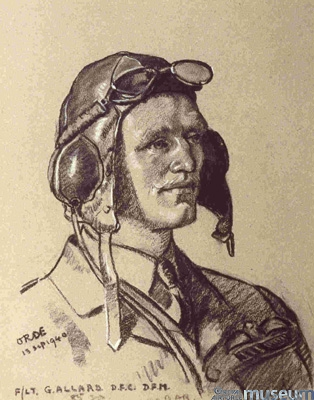
Geoffrey Allard, 1940

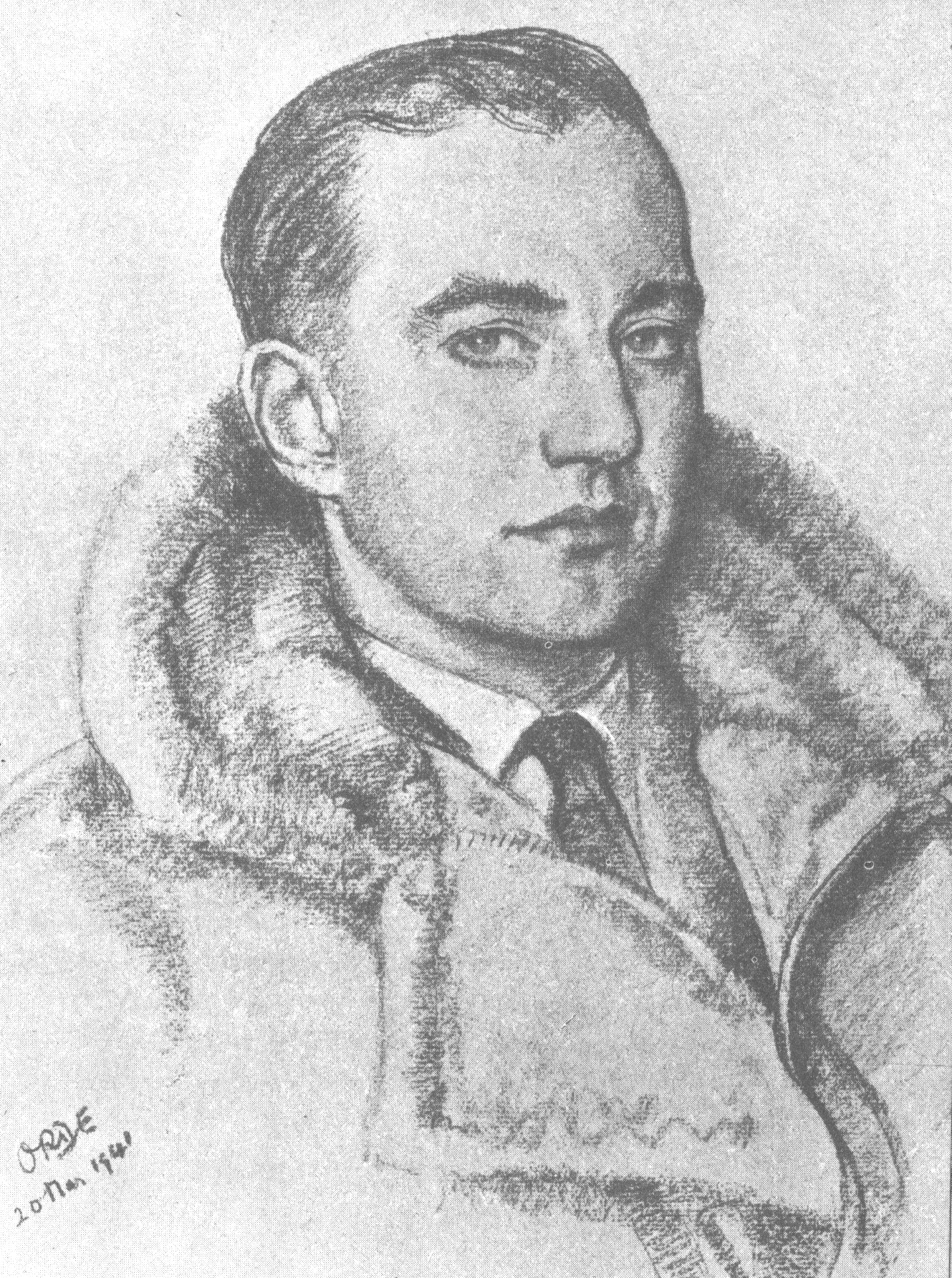
Gerald Edge, 1941

Douglas Bader, 1941

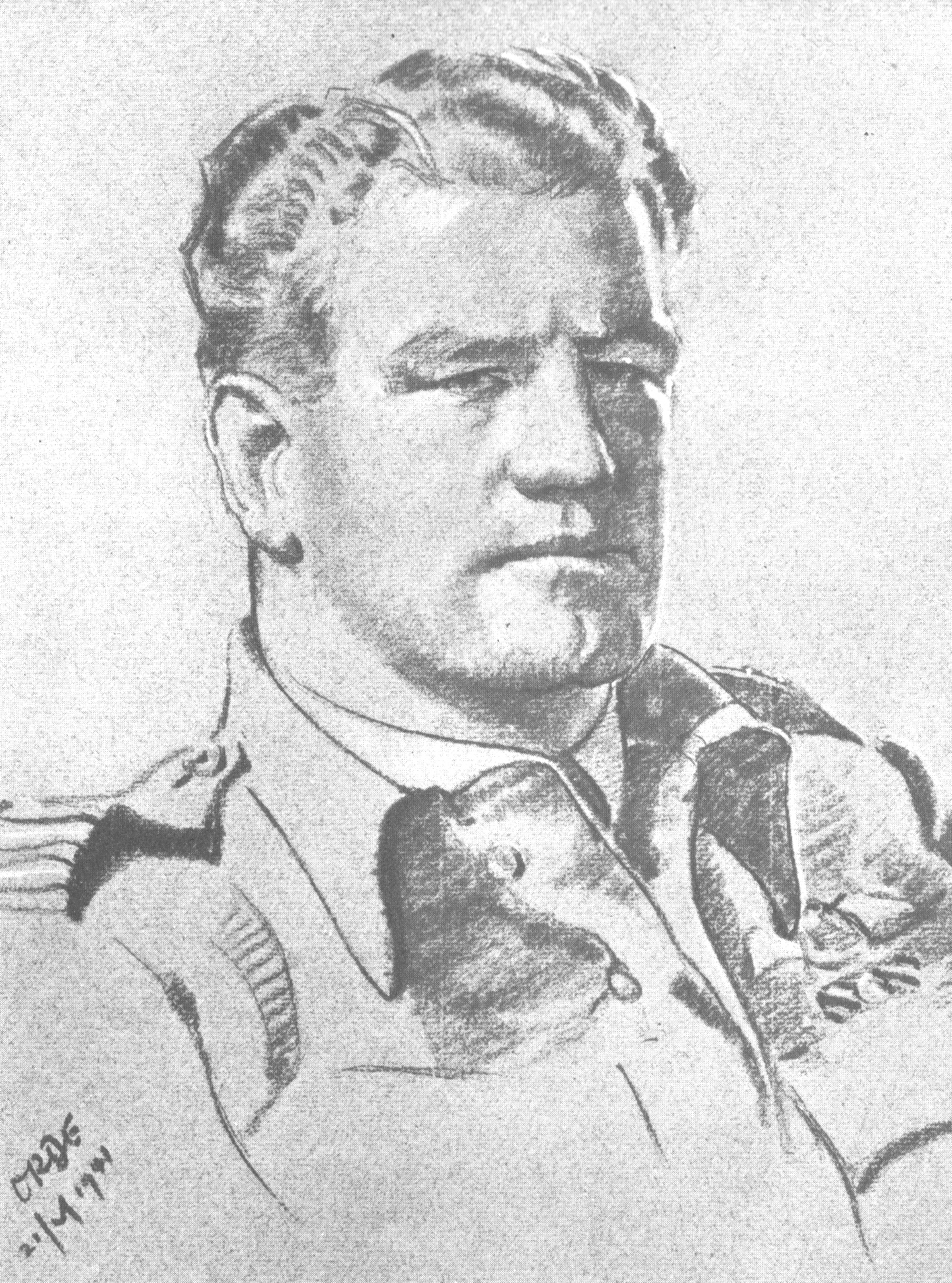
Alan Deere, 1941

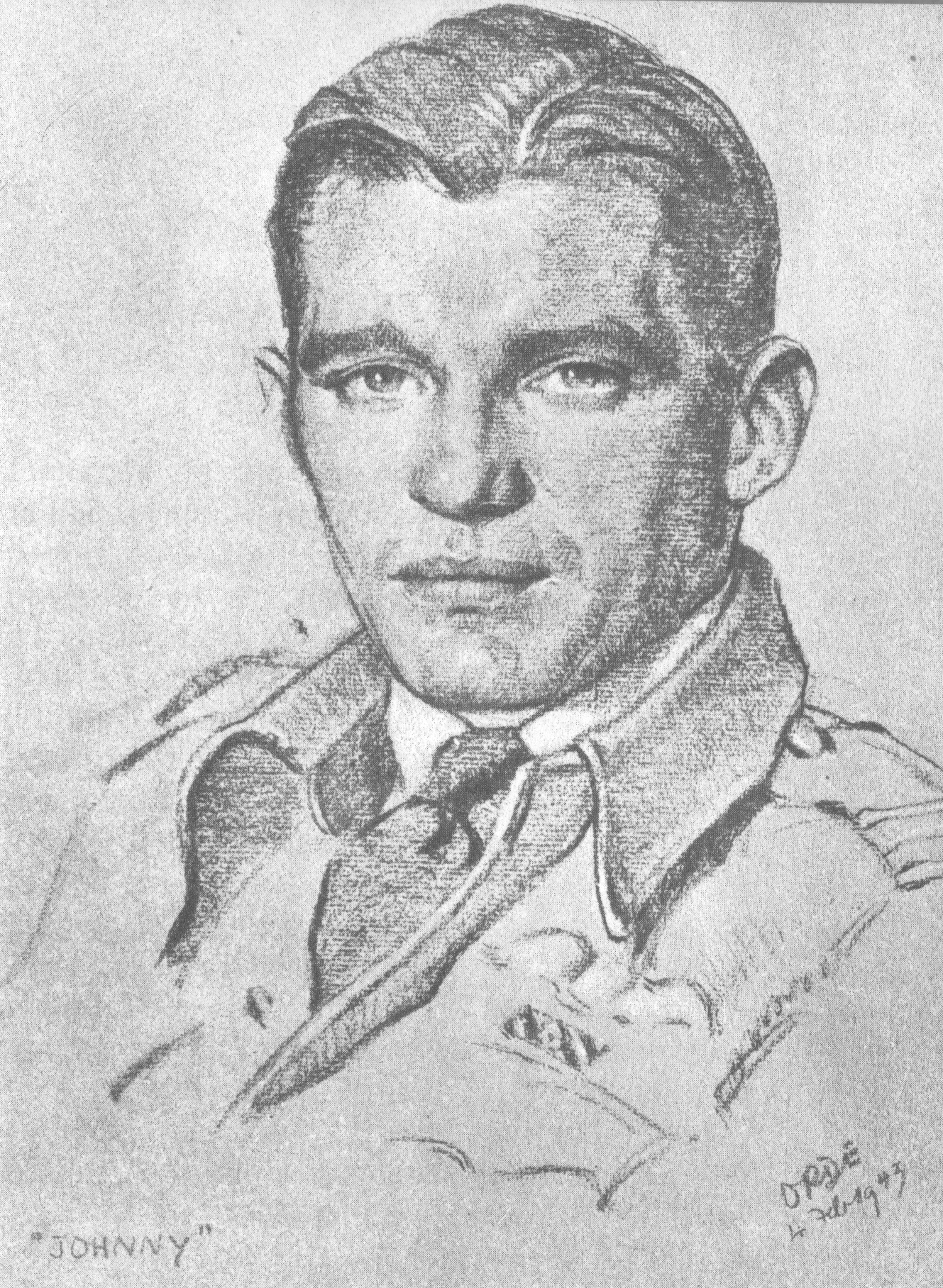
James 'Johnnie' Johnson, 1943

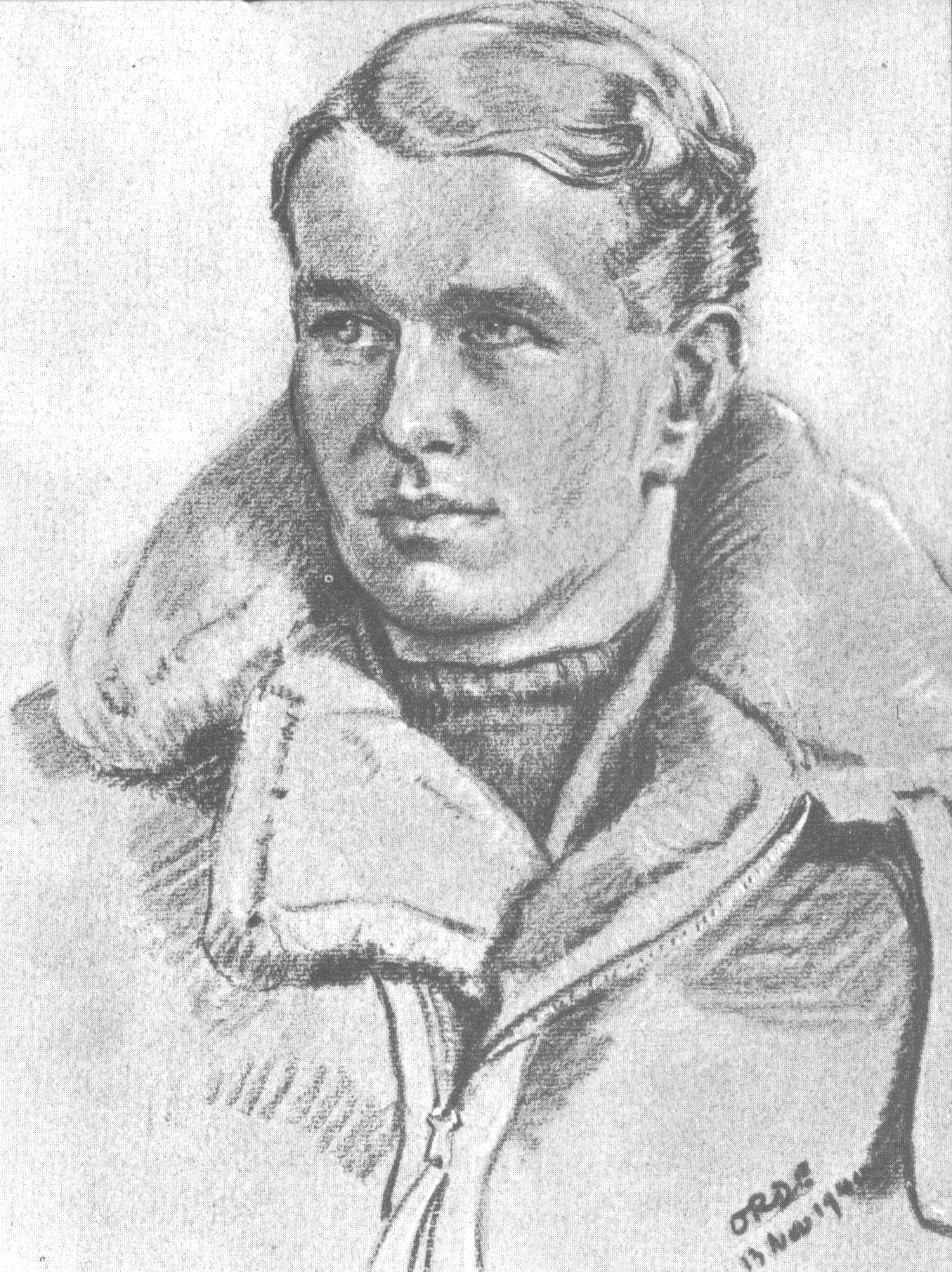
John "Cats Eyes" Cunningham

Sailor Malan, 1940

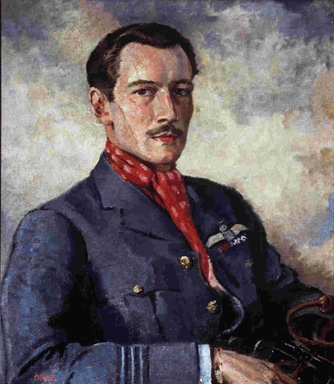
Robert Stanford Tuck, 1941

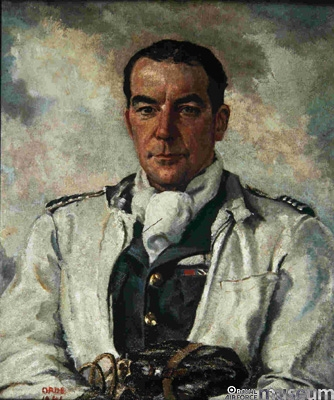
Harry Broadhurst, 1941

== Family ==
Orde married Lady Eileen Wellesley (13 February 1887 – 31 October 1952), daughter of Arthur Wellesley, 4th Duke of Wellington, on 11 September 1916 at St Bartholomew-the-Great, Smithfield, London. Eileen Orde died on 31 October 1952, aged 65. Orde was remarried a year later, to Alexandra Dalziel. She died in London almost thirty years after her husband in May 1997, aged 89.

They had two children. A daughter, Julian, was born on 31 December 1917. Julian had been a common name in the Orde family for generations, for both boys and girls. A second daughter, Jane, was born on 6 March 1921. The National Portrait Gallery has several photographs of Eileen and the children taken in May 1921.

Julian became a poet, writer and actor. She married Ralph Abercrombie in London in 1949. She died in 1974, aged 56.

Jane married David Macindoe, Vice-Provost of Eton College, in 1944. She died on 7 July 1995, aged 74. They had four children, Peter (who died in infancy), Sophia, Angus and Catriona.
