= John Freeborn =

British flying ace (1919–2010)

John Connell Freeborn
- Squadron Leader John Freeborn, c. 1944
- Born: 1 December 1919; Middleton, Yorkshire
- Died: 28 August 2010 (aged 90); Southport, Merseyside
- Military career
- Allegiance: United Kingdom
- Branch: Royal Air Force
- Service years: 1938–1948
- Rank: Wing commander
- Service number: 70854
- Units: No. 74 Squadron RAF; No. 602 Squadron RAF
- Commands: No. 118 Squadron RAF; No. 286 Wing RAF
- Conflicts: Second World War: Battle of Dunkirk; Battle of Britain
- Awards: Distinguished Flying Cross & Bar
- Other work: Regional Director for Minster Minerals soft drinks Author

John Connell Freeborn, DFC & Bar (1 December 1919 – 28 August 2010) was a fighter pilot and flying ace in the Royal Air Force (RAF) during the Second World War.

In 1939, he shot down another RAF fighter in a friendly-fire incident that marked the first death of an RAF fighter pilot in the war, as well as the first aircraft shot down by a Supermarine Spitfire. The following year, he flew more operational hours than any other RAF pilot during the Battle of Britain.

== Early life ==
Freeborn was born in Middleton in West Yorkshire. His father Harold was a branch manager with the Yorkshire Penny Bank (now Yorkshire Bank), and he was something of a disciplinarian at home. Freeborn remembered that his mother Jean (née Connell) was a stern woman, saying 'I never saw her smile'. He had five siblings, two sisters and three brothers.

They moved to Headingley when Freeborn was still an infant. He later attended Leeds Grammar School and, although a bright and confident pupil, his dislike of petty authority made him glad to leave as soon as possible.

Later, during the war, he borrowed a Gloster Gauntlet and flew up to revisit his alma mater, giving an aerobatic display before landing on the school cricket pitch. Freeborn described the irony of having the masters who, only a few years earlier, had berated and beaten him telling a new crop of pupils what a shining example he was.

He joined the RAF on a short service commission in January 1938. In training, he was flying solo after 4 hours 20 minutes logged flight time, a little over half the average; his accuracy at firing whilst in the air was more than twice the average. Commissioned as an acting pilot officer on probation on 26 March 1938 he initially flew Gloster Gauntlets, but in October 1938 he joined 74 Squadron, and from February 1939 flew Spitfires.

In July 1939 Freeborn was one of the 74 Squadron pilots to fly Spitfires to France to celebrate Bastille Day with the French Air Force.

== Second World War ==
=== Battle of Barking Creek ===
On 6 September 1939, Freeborn took part in an action later called the Battle of Barking Creek, in which two No. 56 Squadron Hurricanes were intercepted and shot down by aircraft from No. 74 Squadron, thereby becoming the first aircraft destroyed by a Spitfire. Freeborn shot down the aircraft killing Pilot Officer Montague Hulton-Harrop.

Freeborn felt that his commanding officer, Sailor Malan, tried to evade responsibility for the incident. At the ensuing court martial, Malan testified for the prosecution against his own pilots, stating that Freeborn had been irresponsible, impetuous, and had not taken proper heed of vital communications. During the trial, Freeborn's counsel, Sir Patrick Hastings, called Malan "a bare-faced liar."

Though the court exonerated Freeborn completely, he regretted the death of Hulton-Harrop for the rest of his life. In 2009, he said, "I think about him nearly every day. I always have done ... I've had a good life, and he should have had a good life too."

Whilst Freeborn and Malan's working relationship continued to be professional and exceptionally effective, the case strained their personal relationship. It is noteworthy that Malan did not recommend Freeborn for either of his subsequent medals. On Malan's departure in March 1941, Freeborn was not given command.

=== Dunkirk ===
Confirmed in his rank of pilot officer on 17 January 1940, his first taste of enemy action was over Dunkirk covering the British Expeditionary Force's escape. 74 Squadron was there for six days from 21 to 27 May 1940. During that time they scored 19 confirmed kills—two of them Freeborn's—and 10 probable kills, with only four losses.

During one action his engine was hit by return fire from a Junkers Ju 88 and crash-landed in France. Evading the advancing German troops, at one point pinned down by machine-gun fire hiding in a cemetery, he walked for several days to Calais, where a Blenheim took him back to England.

=== Battle of Britain ===
Freeborn fought throughout the Battle of Britain as part of 74 Squadron. On 10 July he claimed a Bf 109 of JG 51 and on 24 July shared a Dornier Do 17 'unconfirmed'. Another Bf 109 was claimed on 28 July. On 11 August 1940, the squadron flew into battle four times in eight hours, destroying 23 enemy aircraft, three by Freeborn (2 Bf 110s and a Bf 109) and damaging 14 more. That evening, back at base in Hornchurch, Winston Churchill congratulated the squadron and their ground crew. On 13 August he claimed a Dornier Do 17, but was shot down again, although he wasn't hurt. Freeborn's accomplished flying made him an ace during the Battle of Britain, with seven confirmed kills and he was awarded the Distinguished Flying Cross on 13 August 1940 and promoted to command a flight on 28 August. His DFC citation said:

This officer has taken part in nearly all offensive patrols carried out by his squadron since the commencement of the war, including operations over the Low Countries and Dunkirk, and, more recently, engagements over the Channel and southeastern England. During this period of intensive air warfare he has destroyed four enemy aircraft. His high courage and exceptional abilities as a leader have materially contributed to the notable successes and high standard of efficiency maintained by his squadron.

Freeborn's portrait was drawn by war artist Cuthbert Orde in August 1940 and on 3 September he was promoted to flying officer. He claimed another Do 17 on 11 September and a share in a JG 27 Bf 109 on 17 November. By the end of November he had been with his squadron longer than any other Battle of Britain pilot and had flown more operational hours. Three Bf 109s (and one shared) were claimed on 5 December.

=== Later war ===
Freeborn received a Bar to his DFC in February 1941. The citation read:

This officer has continuously engaged in operations since the beginning of the war. He has destroyed at least twelve enemy aircraft and damaged many more. He is a keen and courageous leader.

In June 1941 he was posted to No 57 Operational Training Unit at RAF Hawarden, training pilots from overseas to fly Spitfires. On 3 September, he was promoted to war substantive flight lieutenant.

Following American entry into the war at the end of 1941, Freeborn was posted to the United States. He trained pilots at bases in Alabama, then moved on to test piloting new aircraft, including the P-47 Thunderbolt (which he hated), the P-51 Mustang, P-38 Lightning, B-17 Flying Fortress and A-20 Havoc.

In December 1942 he returned to the UK and served as a flight commander with 602 Squadron flying Spitfires. He flew escort operations to bombers attacking German shipping and installations on the French and Dutch coasts.

In June 1943 he joined 118 Squadron as commanding officer, again flying Spitfires. This only lasted three months before the squadron moved to Scotland for less-confrontational patrolling and training duties.

On 1 January 1944, he was promoted to the temporary rank of squadron leader (seniority from 1 July 1943). He was promoted to war substantive squadron leader on 30 April.

In June 1944 Freeborn was promoted to become the RAF's youngest flying wing commander, commanding 286 Wing based at Grottaglie in southern Italy. This was a period of frenetic activity, attacking German installations and convoys in the Balkans and defending Allied ones in Italy. In December, he was posted to RAF Netheravon.

Freeborn was always an outspoken and forthright man, and never held back from expressing his opinion even when it was as iconoclastic as disliking Sailor Malan. Of Douglas Bader, Freeborn told one author that "[h]e was not universally popular with his comrades, he made me sick. I’ve never met such a self-opinionated fool in all my life."

== After the war ==
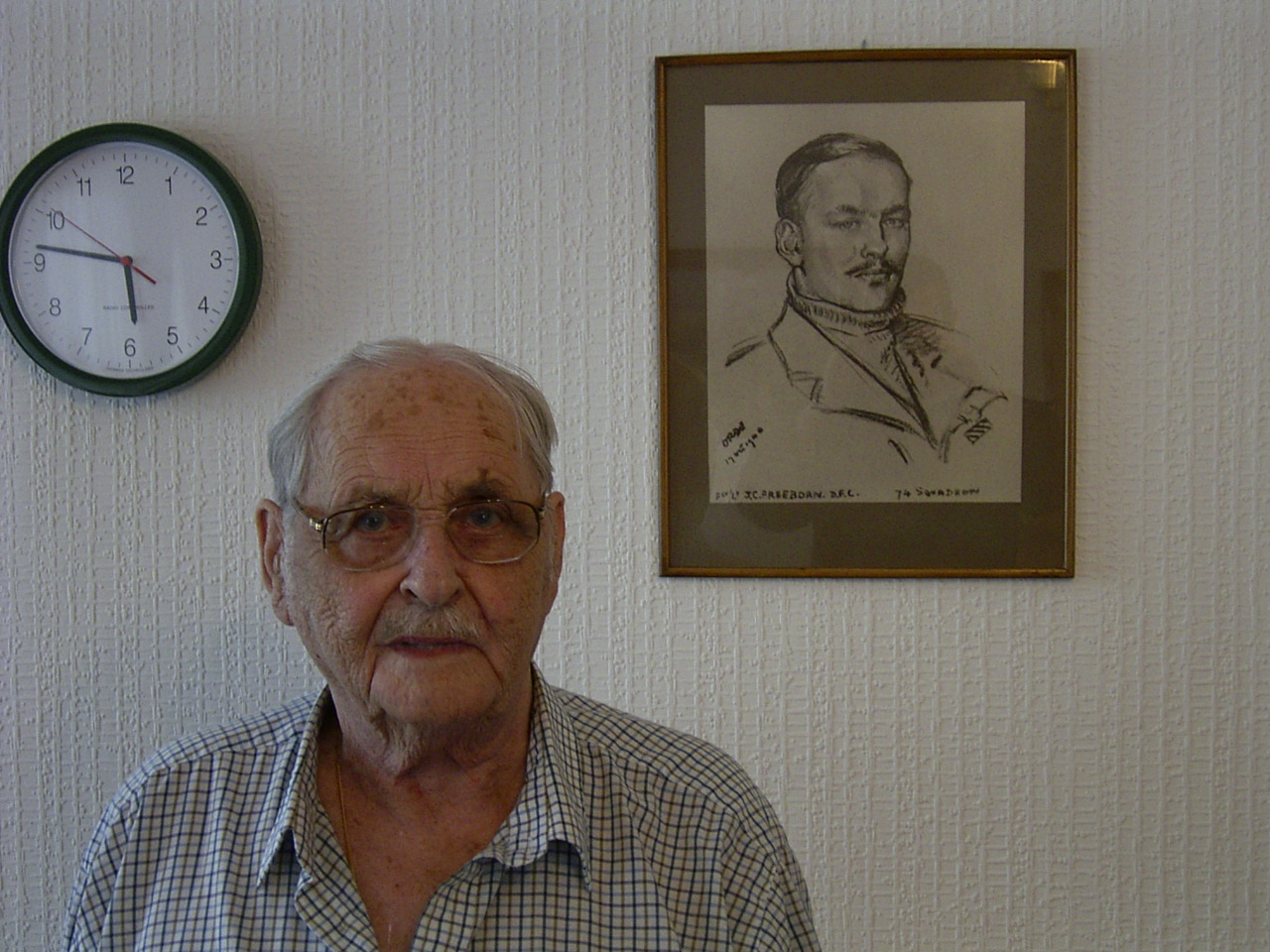
John Freeborn in front of his portrait by Cuthbert Orde, 2004

Believing the post-war RAF to be "run by nincompoops", Freeborn resigned in 1946. He remained in the reserves for another two years, receiving a substantive promotion to flight lieutenant on 1 November 1947 (seniority from 1 September 1945). He had flown 42 different aircraft during his years of service.

In civilian life, Freeborn qualified as a driving instructor, but soon joined Tetley Walker to serve as a regional director for their Minster Minerals soft drinks brand. He took early retirement and moved to Spain in the early 1980s, but later returned to the UK.

Although popular as an interviewee and event guest, for many years he shied away from committing his story to more lasting record. He relented to talk at length to military historian Bob Cossey, which led to the biography of his military career, A Tiger's Tale, in 2002. This, in turn, gave rise to Tiger Cub, Freeborn's own account of his time in 74 Squadron, which he co-authored with Christopher Yeoman and published in 2009.

Freeborn died in Southport and Formby Hospital on 28 August 2010.

== Personal life ==
Freeborn married Rita Fielder in early 1944, reportedly after she broke off her previous engagement to John's cousin after seeing a picture of John in the Yorkshire Post; they had one daughter, Julia. Rita died in 1979. Freeborn married his second wife, Margaret Ena (known as Peta) Thomas, in 1983. She died in 2001.

== Combat record ==
Chronicle of aerial victories
Date	Flying	Location	Kills	Probables	Damaged
22 May 40	Spitfire I	10m N Calais	1 Junkers Ju 88		
27 May 40	Spitfire I	5m from Dunkirk	1 Messerschmitt Bf 109		
10 July 40	Spitfire I	2m E Deal, Kent	1 Messerschmitt Bf 109		
28 July 40	Spitfire I	Dover	1 Messerschmitt Bf 109		
11 Aug 40	Spitfire I	Dover; 30m E Harwich; off Margate	2 Messerschmitt Bf 110; 1 Messerschmitt Bf 109	1 Messerschmitt Bf 109	
13 Aug 40	Spitfire I	Thames Estuary off Birchington	1 Dornier Do 17		
11 Sep 40	Spitfire I	SE London	1 Dornier Do 17		
14 Sep 40	Spitfire I	Lowestoft			0.3 Heinkel He 111
17 Nov 40	Spitfire II	Nr Brighton	0.5 Messerschmitt Bf 109		
5 Dec 40	Spitfire II	10-15m off Dungeness; 10m Boulogne; Nr Dover	2.5 Messerschmitt Bf 109		1 Messerschmitt Bf 109
5 Feb 41	Spitfire II P7366	S Dover			0.25 Dornier Do 17
4 Mar 41	Spitfire II	15m N Dunkirk			0.5 Messerschmitt Bf 109
TOTAL			11 kills, 2 shared	1 probable	5 damaged

An additional 3.3 unconfirmed kills are attributed to him:

- 21 May 1940, 1 Junkers Ju 88, near Dunkirk
- 24 May 1940, 1 Messerschmitt Bf 109, near Dunkirk
- 27 May 1940, 1 Messerschmitt Bf 109, near Dunkirk
- 24 July 1940, 0.3 Messerschmitt Bf 109, off Dover

(Source for all combat record: Aces High – A Tribute to the Most Notable Fighter Pilots of the British and Commonwealth Forces in World War II)
