= Claude Taylor (cricketer) =

English cricketer (1904–1966)

Personal information
- Full name: Claude Hilary Taylor
- Born: 6 February 1904; Leicester, Leicestershire, England
- Died: 28 January 1966 (aged 61); Sherfield on Loddon, Hampshire, England
- Batting: Right-handed
- Bowling: Leg break googly

Domestic team information
- Years: Team
- 1946–1947: Buckinghamshire
- 1923–1926: Oxford University
- 1922–1927: Leicestershire

Career statistics
Competition	First-class
Matches	88
Runs scored	3,378
Batting average	24.83
100s/50s	9/8
Top score	105
Balls bowled	1,484
Wickets	21
Bowling average	43.80
5 wickets in innings	–
10 wickets in match	–
Best bowling	2/6
Catches/stumpings	66/–
- Source: Cricinfo, 13 August 2011

Claude Hilary Taylor (6 February 1904 – 28 January 1966) was an English cricketer. Taylor was a right-handed batsman who bowled leg break googly. He was born in Leicester, Leicestershire.

Taylor made his first-class debut for Leicestershire against Sussex in the 1922 County Championship, after completing five seasons in the First XI at Westminster School. His school record in his final year was among the very strongest in the country, and he took six wickets when Charterhouse were dismissed before lunch for 25 on a plum wicket at Vincent Square. That autumn he began reading Classics at Christ Church, Oxford, and the following summer made his first-class debut for Oxford University Cricket Club against Lancashire. He made history in this year by becoming the first freshman to score a century in The University Match, making 109 against Cambridge University. He gained his Oxford Blue in the 1923 season. Taylor went on to make 42 first-class appearances for the university, the last of which came against Cambridge University in 1926. During his time playing for Oxford, Taylor scored 2,018 runs at an average of 28.42, making 5 half centuries and 5 centuries, with a top score of 115. This score came against Sussex in 1923. As an occasional bowler, Taylor took 14 wickets at a bowling average of 34.07, with best figures of 2/9.

While studying at Oxford, Taylor continued to play for Leicestershire at the end of each academic year. In 1924, when he played the second half of the season for Leicestershire, Taylor was notable for being the only Leicestershire batsman to score a century in that season, when he scored 123 against Hampshire at the County Ground, Southampton. He continued to play for Leicestershire until the end of the 1927 season, by which time he had made 45 first-class appearances for the county. In these, he had scored 1,327 runs at an average of 21.06, with three half centuries and four centuries, with his highest score being the 123 he made against Hampshire in 1924. With the ball, his occasional leg spin took 7 wickets at an average of 56.71, with best figures of 2/6. He also appeared in a single first-class match for the Free Foresters in 1927 against his former university.

Taylor would appear in minor county cricket nearly twenty years later, appearing for Buckinghamshire after World War II, with his debut coming against Dorset in the 1946 Minor Counties Championship. He made 15 further Minor Counties Championship appearances for Buckinghamshire, the last of which came against Bedfordshire in 1947. On occasion he also captained Buckinghamshire. For many years he was a schoolmaster at Eton College, where Henry Blofeld was among the pupils he coached. Along with Buckinghamshire team-mate and fellow Eton master David Macindoe, he was the joint-author of the book Cricket Dialogue.

Taylor married Margaret Peebles, the sister of the English Test cricketer Ian Peebles. He died in Sherfield on Loddon, Hampshire, on 28 January 1966.
