= David Macindoe =

English cricketer

Personal information
- Full name: David Henry Macindoe
- Born: 1 September 1917; Eton, Buckinghamshire, England
- Died: 3 March 1986 (aged 68); Eton, Berkshire, England
- Batting: Right-handed
- Bowling: Right-arm medium-fast

Domestic team information
- Years: Team
- 1937–1946: Oxford University
- 1937–1947: Buckinghamshire

Career statistics
Competition	First-class
Matches	42
Runs scored	747
Batting average	14.36
100s/50s	–/2
Top score	51
Balls bowled	10,149
Wickets	152
Bowling average	28.54
5 wickets in innings	5
10 wickets in match	1
Best bowling	6/61
Catches/stumpings	38/–
- Source: Cricinfo, 1 September 2011

Major David Henry Macindoe MC (1 September 1917 – 3 March 1986) was an English cricketer. Macindoe was a right-handed batsman who bowled right-arm medium-fast. His bowling was characterised by a long run-up and a high arm action. The son of Patrick Macindoe and Cicely Broadbent, he was born at Eton, and educated at Eton College.

== First-class debut ==
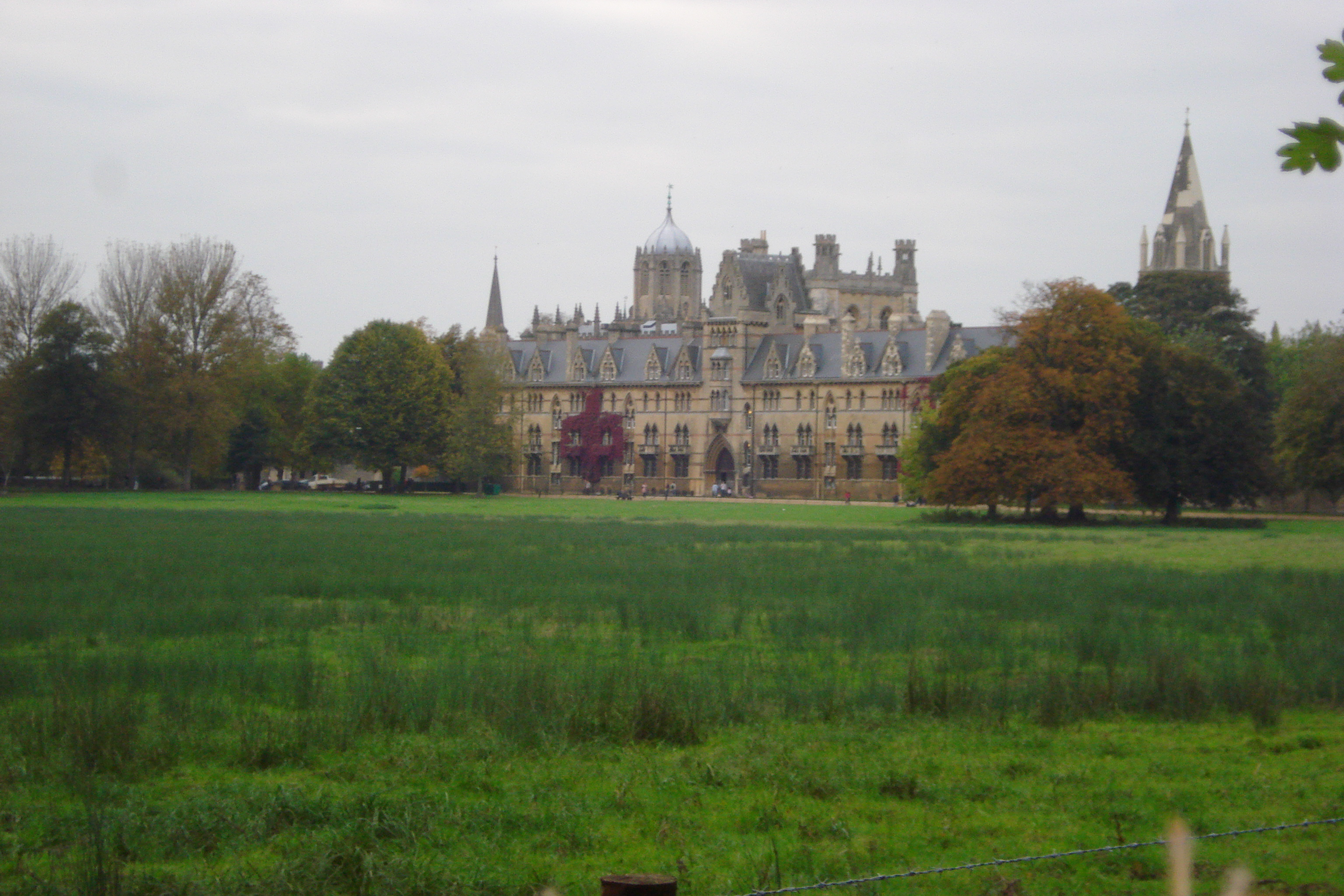
Macindoe studied at Christ Church, Oxford before WWII, following the war he resumed his studies there

While studying at Christ Church, Oxford, Macindoe made his first-class debut for Oxford University against Gloucestershire in 1937. He made the majority of his first-class appearances for the university prior to World War II, making 31 appearances between 1937 and 1939. During this period he took 118 wickets, which came at a respectable average of 28.92. His debut season was his most successful, with him taking 44 wickets at 24.40. A competent lower order batsman, he had his best season with the bat in the 1939 season, scoring 296 runs for the university at a batting average of 29.90, with a high score of 51. He scored both of his first-class fifties in this season, with the score of 51 coming against the Minor Counties. He played a first-class match for the Gentlemen in 1937, becoming the first freshman since Sammy Woods in 1888 to be selected for the Gentlemen. He also played once for the Gentlemen of England in 1938 against the touring Australians.

Prior to the war, Macindoe also played Minor counties cricket for Buckinghamshire, making his debut for the county in the 1937 Minor Counties Championship against Hertfordshire. With university commitments, he played infrequently for the county, making eight appearances.

== World War II and after ==
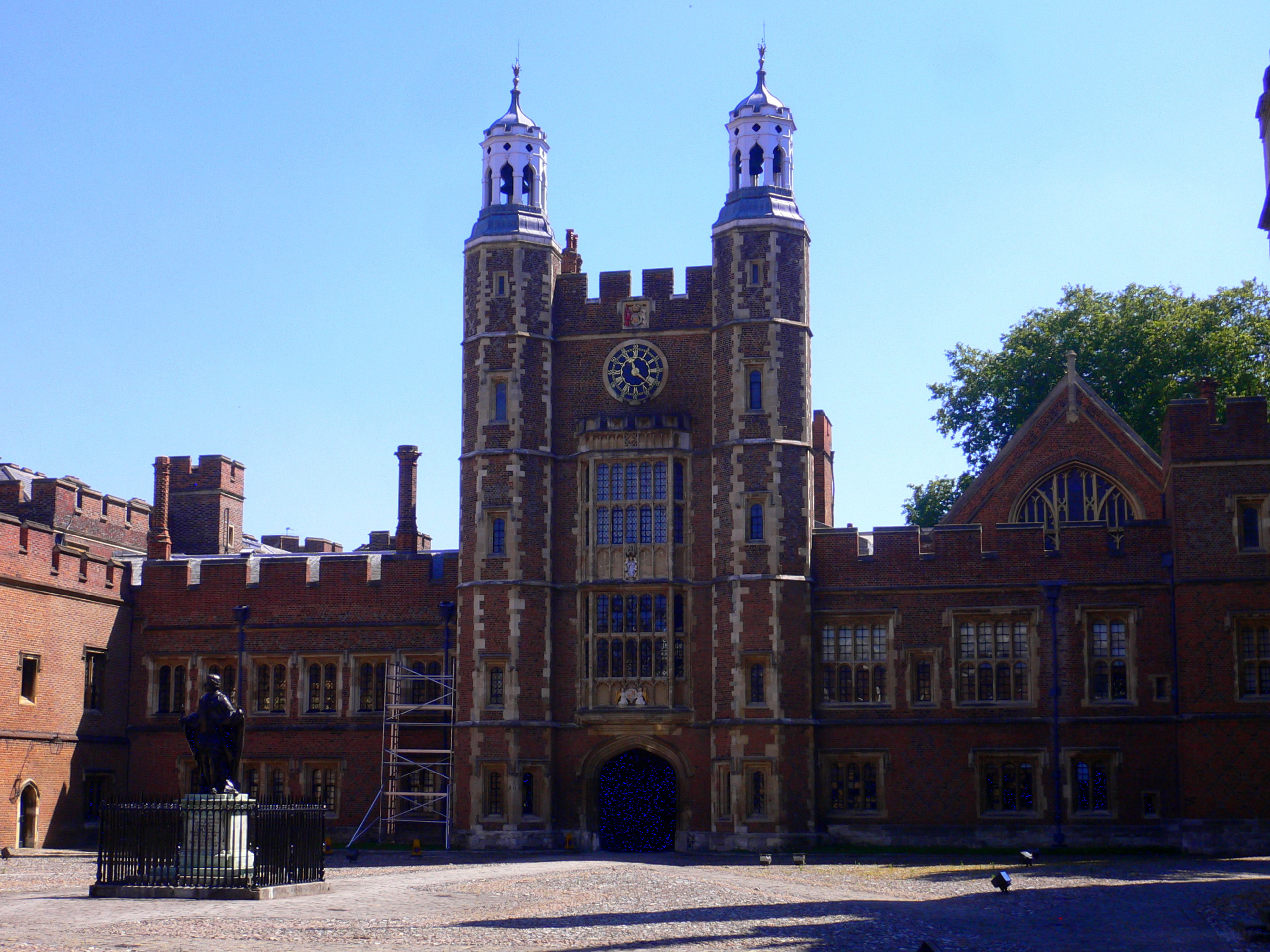
Macindoe taught at Eton College for many years, eventually becoming its Vice-Provost

Macindoe served in World War II, by 1940 he was serving in the Royal Artillery holding the rank of 2nd Lieutenant. He was awarded the Military Cross in 1945, with an announcement being made in the London Gazette on 10 April 1945. He left the military in September 1946, upon resigning his commission he was honourably granted the rank of Major.

After the war he returned to Christ Church, Oxford, where in 1946 he was the President of the university's Vincent's Club. Returning to the university cricket team, he made ten further first-class appearances for Oxford University in 1946, the last of which came against Cambridge University. In the 1946 season, he took 34 wickets at an average of 27.23, with best figures of 6/61, which came against Lancashire. This brought the total number of wickets he took for Oxford University to 149, which came at an average of 27.80. His total number of runs scored for the university stood at 747 runs at an average of 14.94. After the war he also resumed playing for Buckinghamshire, playing for the county in the 1947 season and making ten appearances in that season.

In 1949, he began his teaching career at Eton College, where in his youth he had been educated. He taught English and Latin, as well as coaching cricket at the college. He was part of the Territorial Army in 1952, which coincided with him heading the Combined Cadet Force at Eton. His role as master of college lasted until 1960. Macindoe along with Claude Taylor, who was his predecessor in the cricket role at Eton, as well as his former Buckinghamshire teammate, was the joint-author of the book Cricket Dialogue. He ended his teaching career as the Vice-Provost of Eton.

== Personal life ==
Macindoe married Jane Orde, the daughter of Captain Cuthbert Orde and Lady Eileen Wellesley, in 1944. The couple had four children. Their first child, Peter, was born in 1944 and died in 1947. Macindoe died suddenly at Eton on 3 March 1986, having suffered a heart attack. His wife survived him by nine years.
