= Bobby Oxspring =

British flying ace

Robert Wardlow Oxspring
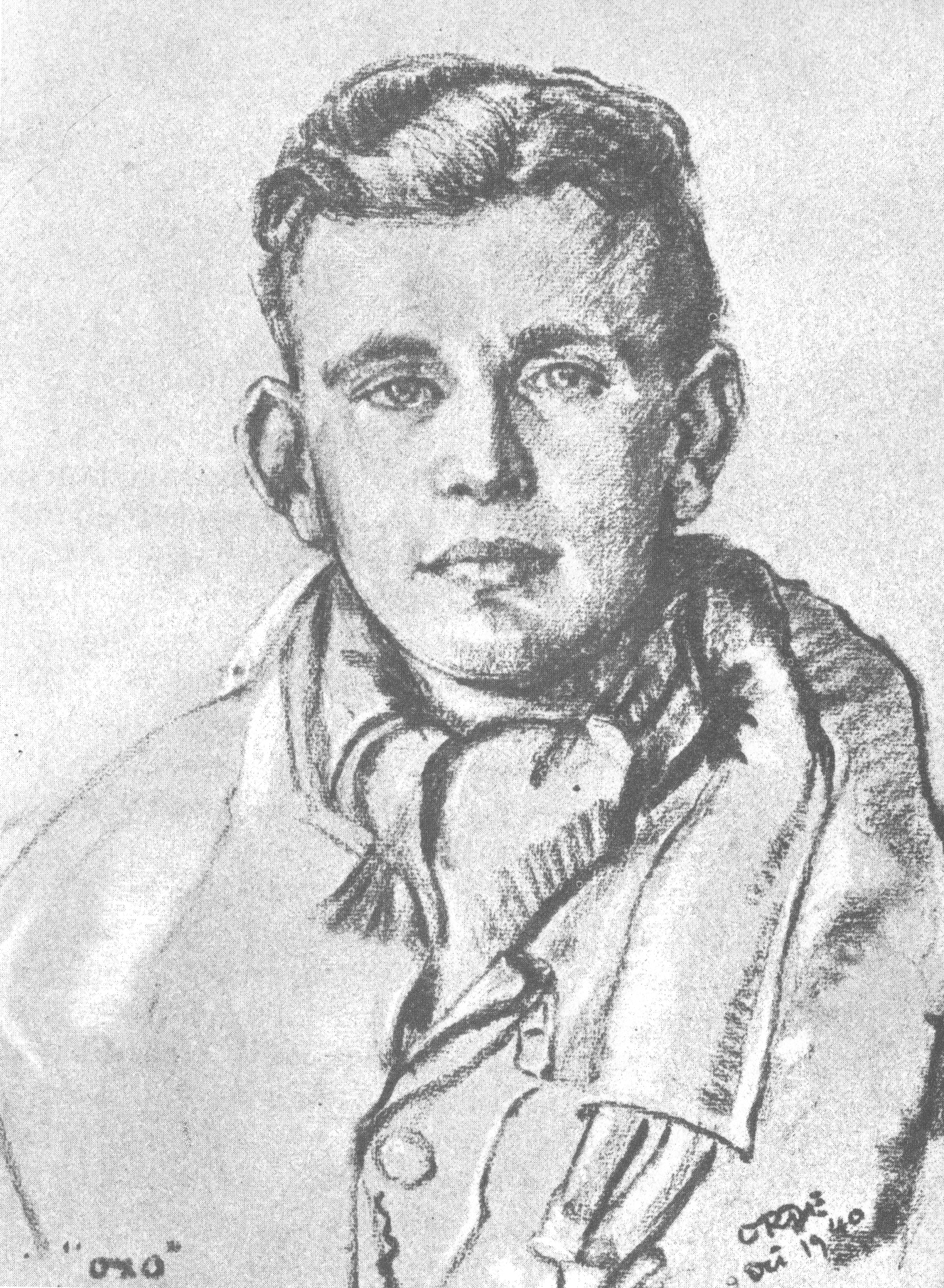
- Bobby Oxspring by Cuthbert Orde, 1940
- Born: 22 May 1919; Sheffield, Yorkshire, England
- Died: 8 August 1989 (aged 70); Stamford, Lincolnshire, England
- Burial place: Cranwell, Lincolnshire
- Military career
- Allegiance: United Kingdom
- Branch: Royal Air Force
- Service years: 1938–1968
- Rank: Group Captain
- Nickname: Bobby
- Service number: 40743
- Units: No. 66 Squadron; No. 41 Squadron
- Commands: RAF Gatow (1965–67); No. 73 Squadron (1949); No. 54 Squadron (1948); Detling Wing (1945); No. 141 Wing (1944–45); No. 222 Squadron (1942); No. 72 Squadron (1942, 1942–1943); No. 91 Squadron (1942)
- Conflicts: Second World War: Battle of Britain; Circus offensive; Operation Jubilee; Tunisian campaign; Operation Diver
- Awards: Distinguished Flying Cross & Two Bars; Air Force Cross; Airman's Cross (Netherlands)

Robert Wardlow Oxspring, DFC & Two Bars, AFC (22 May 1919 – 8 August 1989) was a Royal Air Force (RAF) officer and flying ace of the Second World War. He was credited with the destruction of at least fifteen aircraft and four V-1 flying bombs.

From Sheffield, Oxspring, the son of a former fighter pilot of the Royal Flying Corps, joined the RAF on a short service commission in 1938. Once his training was completed, he was posted to No. 66 Squadron. He flew Supermarine Spitfire fighters during the Battle of Britain and achieved several aerial victories, his successes resulting in an award of the Distinguished Flying Cross (DFC). After periods of service during the Circus offensive of 1941 as a flight commander with other squadrons, in January 1942 he was appointed commander of No. 91 Squadron. Later in the year he led No. 72 Squadron but in mid-August was briefly detached from the unit to command No. 222 Squadron during its participation in Operation Jubilee. Award a Bar to his DFC for this work, he resumed command of No. 72 Squadron and later took it to North Africa. He led it during much of its service in the Tunisian campaign, claiming several more aerial victories until he was rested from operations in April 1943 and awarded a second Bar to his DFC. After a period on ground duties, in March 1944 he resumed operational flying with command of a fighter wing, leading it during Operation Diver and destroying several V-1 flying bombs. He ended the war as commander of the Detling Wing.

Oxspring continued to serve in the RAF in the postwar period. After training on jet fighters, he was given command of No. 54 Squadron, flying de Havilland Vampires. He was awarded the Air Force Cross for his leadership of a flight of Vampires making a demonstration tour of the United States and Canada; it was the first time jet aircraft had flown across the Atlantic. He went on to hold a series of staff and command posts in his later service in the RAF, ending his career in 1968 as a group captain. In his retirement, he lived in Lincolnshire and published his autobiography. He died on 8 August 1989 after a period of ill health.

== Early life ==
Robert Wardlow Oxspring was born in Sheffield, in the United Kingdom, on 22 May 1919. His father, also named Robert, had served in the First World War as an infantryman in the British Army before transferring to the Royal Flying Corps; he flew with No. 54 Squadron and then No. 66 Squadron and was credited with sixteen aerial victories and twice awarded the Military Cross. Oxspring was educated at Sheffield's De la Salle College and then, in March 1938, joined the Royal Air Force (RAF).

Oxspring's initial training was at No. 4 Elementary & Reserve Flying Training School at Brough Aerodrome and after passing this phase in May, he was granted a short service commission as an acting pilot officer. He then trained at No. 2 Flying Training School at Brize Norton and at the end of the year was sent to No. 66 Squadron, in which his father had previously served. Known as 'Bobby' in RAF service, he was described by a fellow pilot, Hubert Allen, as "a tallish, good-looking, fair-headed bloke". No. 66 Squadron was based at Duxford and in the process of equipping with the Supermarine Spitfire fighter; it was the second RAF squadron to become operational with the aircraft.

== Second World War ==
On the outbreak of the Second World War, No. 66 Squadron was tasked with interception duties and also conducted patrols along the North Sea coastline. In mid-May 1940, Oxspring was posted to No. 263 Squadron as a reinforcement pilot after it had served in the Norwegian campaign but after ten days he returned to No. 66 Squadron, now based at Horsham St Faith. At the end of May the squadron assisted in the provision of aerial cover for the evacuation of the British Expeditionary Force from Dunkirk.

=== Battle of Britain ===
For the early stages of the Battle of Britain, No. 66 Squadron was based at Coltishall and was mostly engaged in patrolling duties. Oxspring's first aerial victory was achieved on 29 July, when he shared in the destruction of a Heinkel He 111 medium bomber near a shipping convoy several miles from Lowestoft. He reported seeing the bomber ditch in the sea and its crew take to a dinghy. In early September his squadron moved to No. 11 Group's sector, being based at Kenley and becoming more intensively involved in the aerial fighting over the southeast of England. Oxspring, now holding the rank of flying officer and commanding one of the squadron's flights, shot down a He 111 to the east of Rye on 11 September.

On 15 September, now known as Battle of Britain Day, Oxspring destroyed a Dornier Do 17 medium bomber to the south of Chatham and damaged a pair of He 111s over Gravesend. He shot down one Messerschmitt Bf 109 fighter and damaged a second about 10 miles (16 km) north of Hawkinge on 18 September. A He 111 was destroyed by Oxspring near Hastings on 24 September and three days later he shot down a Messerschmitt Bf 110 heavy fighter and damaged a Do 17 over Kent. On the last day of the month, he destroyed a Bf 109 in the vicinity of Biggin Hill. He shot down another Bf 109 over Chatham on 5 October. His last aerial victory of the Battle of Britain was on 13 October, when he destroyed a Bf 109 to the east of Maidstone. On 25 October Oxspring was shot down over Tunbridge Wells but was able to bail out, albeit with minor wounds. The wreckage of his Spitfire came down at Capel.

By this time the pace of operations had slowed with the Luftwaffe switching to nighttime bombing raids although No. 66 Squadron remained in No. 11 Group's sector, relocating to Biggin Hill in November. The same month, in recognition of his services of the previous several weeks, Oxspring was awarded the Distinguished Flying Cross (DFC). The citation, published on 8 November in the London Gazette, read:

One day in September, 1940, Flight Lieutenant Oxspring was engaged on an offensive patrol with his squadron. Whilst acting as rear guard, he sighted and engaged several Messerschmitt Bf 109's 3,000 feet above. After driving them off, he led his section in an attack against a large formation of enemy bombers and succeeded in destroying a Dornier 17 at short range and also in damaging two Heinkel III's. He has at all times led his section with skill and determination, and has destroyed six enemy aircraft.

— London Gazette, No. 34987, 8 November 1940

He was one of the The Few selected by RAF Fighter Command to have a portrait drawn by the official war artist Cuthbert Orde, sitting for it on 9 December. Little flying was done over the winter months but the squadron began re-equipping with the updated Spitfire Mk IIa. In February 1941 it relocated to Exeter and then Cornwall where the squadron engaged in patrolling duties. Two months later, Oxspring was rested from operations and assigned to No. 59 Operational Training Unit at Crosby-on-Eden as an instructor.

=== Circus offensive ===
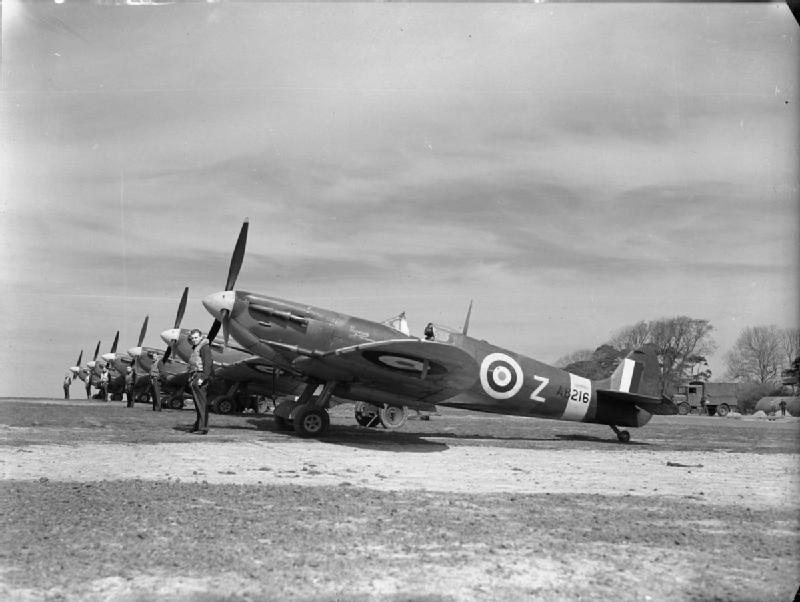
Oxspring in May 1942 standing in front of his personal Supermarine Spitfire when commander of No. 91 Squadron at Hawkinge

Oxspring returned to operations in September with a posting to No. 616 Squadron at Westhampnett but was there for just a week when he was transferred to No. 41 Squadron. By this time he held the rank of flight lieutenant and commanded one of the squadron's flights. Based at Tangmere and equipped with Spitfires, No. 41 Squadron was engaged in the RAF's Circus offensive as well as Rhurbarbs, flying sorties to German-occupied Europe.. In January 1942, Oxspring was appointed commander of No. 91 Squadron. Like his previous unit, this was equipped with Spitfires and engaged in the Circus offensive but operated from Hawkinge.

After six months of leading No. 91 Squadron, Oxspring was given a new command; this was the Spitfire-equipped No. 72 Squadron, which was based at Biggin Hill and engaged in offensive operations. Arriving at the squadron on 12 July, he flew his first sortie, a diversion raid to Abbeville, with it the next day. He probably destroyed a Focke Wulf 190 fighter near Calais on 26 July, as the squadron carried out a sweep to Saint-Omer.

On 13 August Oxspring, along with seven of his pilots, was attached to No. 222 Squadron; he was to lead it in Operation Jubilee, the Allied amphibious attack on Dieppe. In the early morning of 19 August, the squadron provided aerial cover for the beach at Dieppe and did not engage any Luftwaffe fighters. Later in the morning, it again sortied to Dieppe to help cover the Canadian forces evacuating the beaches after the attack was abandoned. Oxspring resumed command of No. 72 Squadron three days later. In September, he was subsequently awarded a Bar to his DFC, at least in part due to his leadership of No. 222 Squadron during its operations over Dieppe. The published citation read:

This squadron commander has rendered much valuable service. His skill, whether in attacks on the enemy's ground targets and shipping or in air combat, has been of a high order. He has destroyed at least 7 enemy aircraft.

— London Gazette, No. 35709, 15 September 1942

=== North Africa ===
Oxspring and his named Spitfire, 'Nigeria', while at No. 91 Squadron

In October, No. 72 Squadron began preparing for a move to an overseas posting. It duly went to Gibraltar and onto Algiers, commencing operations from Maison Blanche with Spitfire Mk. VCs on 17 November. Oxspring achieved his first aerial victory in North Africa on 25 November, when he damaged a Bf 109 and claimed another as probably destroyed, both near Mateur. The next day, he damaged a Junkers Ju 88 medium bomber near Djedeida. He damaged a Macchi C.202 fighter, also in the vicinity of Djedeida, on 29 November and the following day damaged a Savoia-Marchetti SM.79 medium bomber in the Tebourba area. He damaged a MC.202 over Tunis on 1 December and two days later damaged a Bf 109 over Tebourba. He destroyed a Bf 109 over Bizerta on 5 December. Oxspring's final aerial victory of the year was on 22 December when he shot down a Fw 190 near Oued Zarga.

On 2 January 1943, No. 72 Squadron engaged several fighters of the Luftwaffe's JG 51 in the vicinity of Pont du Fahs; Oxspring shot down one Bf 109 and damaged a second. It is thought one of these was flown by German flying ace Anton Hafner. Otherwise, much of January was spent on ground support duties and the squadron then spent three weeks of February re-equipping with the Spitfire Mk. IX. During that month, Oxspring was awarded a second Bar to his DFC with the citation reading:

During initial operations from forward airfields in North Africa Squadron Leader Oxspring led his formation on many sorties. He destroyed one enemy aircraft, bringing his total victories to 8. His outstanding devotion to duty and fine fighting qualities have been worthy of high praise.

— London Gazette, No. 35904, 12 February 1943

Back on operations, Oxspring damaged a Fw 190 near Béja on 28 February and shot down a Bf 109 the next day in the same area. He destroyed another Bf 109 and damaged a second on 11 April near Majaz al Bab. In late April he was rested from operations. Under his leadership, No. 72 Squadron was the RAF's most successful fighter squadron of the North African theatre.

=== Later war service ===
Oxspring's next posting was to the headquarters of No. 242 Group at Majaz al Bab. There he served as a liaison officer between the RAF and the British Army, ensuring requests for air support were acted on as the ground troops advanced into Tunisia. Later in the year, he returned to the United Kingdom and took up a post at the headquarters of Fighter Command, working as a staff officer in the Tactics and Training Branch. In early January 1944 he was promoted to temporary squadron leader, and two months later was appointed leader of No. 24 Wing.

From late June to August, No. 24 Wing was involved in Operation Diver, the British campaign against the V-1 flying bombs that were launched against England. Flying a Spitfire Mk. XIV, Oxspring destroyed four V-1s, on 23 and 29 June, and 6 and 16 July. During this time his substantive rank was made up to squadron leader. In September he was appointed commander of No. 141 Wing, based at Deanland, and then the fighter wing at Detling, his final command of the war.

By the end of the war, Oxspring was credited with the destruction of fifteen aircraft, two of which were shared with other pilots, and four V-1s. He is also credited with damaging thirteen aircraft and the probable destruction of two more. (Note: Hall credits Oxspring with five V-1s destroyed, one shared with another pilot.)

== Postwar service ==
After the end of the war in Europe, Oxspring was posted to the Central Fighter Establishment at Tangmere. Granted a permanent commission in the RAF as a flight lieutenant in September, he then went to the United States to undertake a staff officers course at Fort Leavenworth. His next post was back in the United Kingdom, training on jet fighters. On 10 January 1947, he was one of several British officers given royal recognition of the award of the Dutch Airman's Cross. Later that year he was promoted to squadron leader.

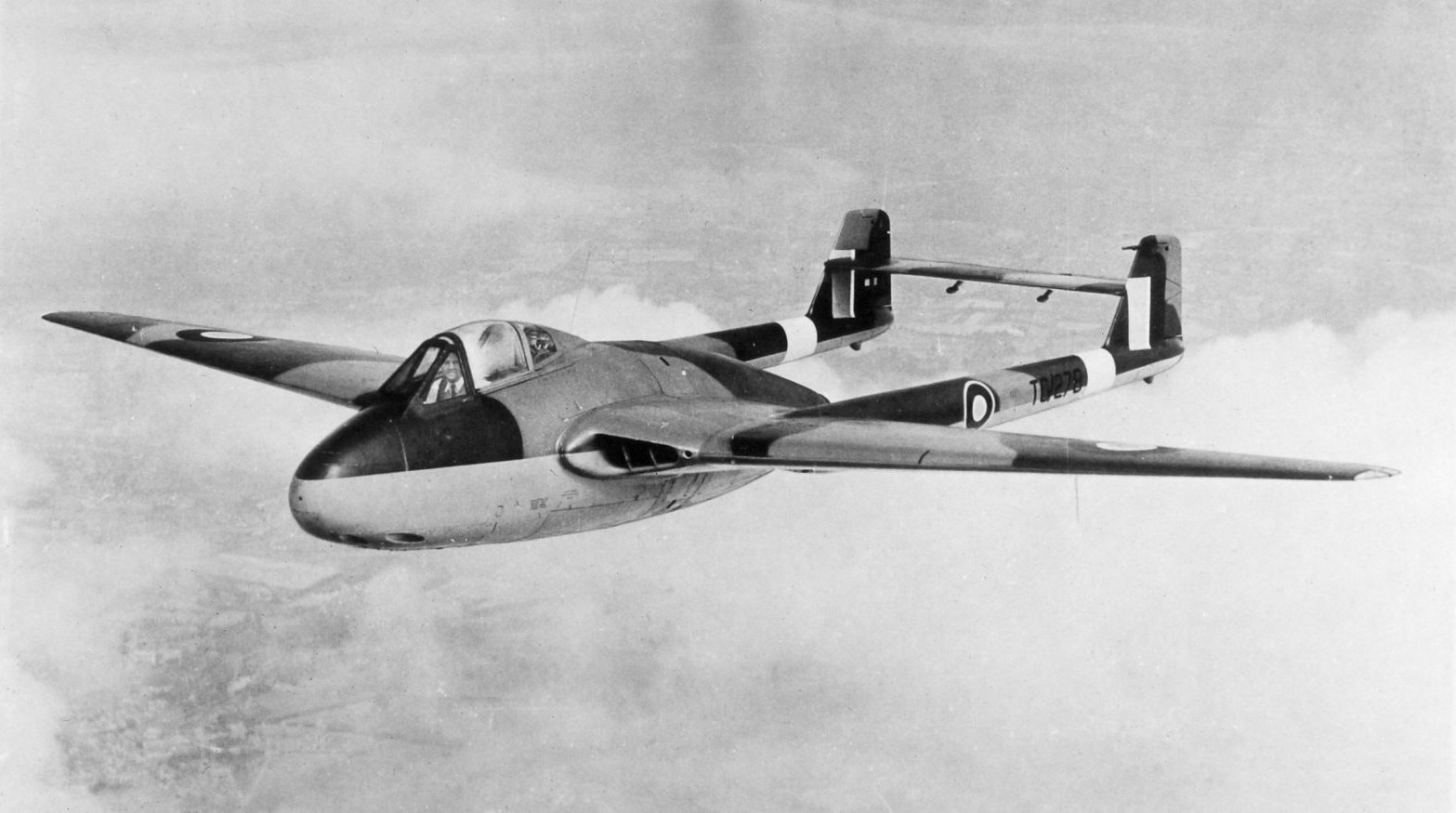
A de Havilland Vampire jet fighter

In May 1948, following the death of its nominal commander, Squadron Leader Frank Howell, Oxspring became commander of No. 54 Squadron. This was equipped with the de Havilland Vampire jet fighter at Odiham and later in the year Oxspring led a flight on a demonstration tour to the United States and Canada. This was the first time jet aircraft crossed the Atlantic and Oxspring was subsequently awarded the Air Force Cross for this exploit in the 1949 New Year Honours. By this time he had relinquished command of the squadron and was serving in the Middle East. After attending a course at the RAF Flying College at Manby, he commanded a wing of Gloster Meteor jet fighters and led it in a flypast at the Queen's Coronation Review in 1953. At this time, he held the rank of wing commander.

From 1955 to 1958 Oxspring served as an exchange officer with the United States Air Force, in its Air Defence Command. He then returned to the United Kingdom with a posting to the staff at the Air Ministry. Promoted to group captain, he subsequently served at the Ministry of Defence until 1965. At that time, he was appointed commander of the RAF station at Gatow in Berlin. He retired from the RAF on 29 February 1968.

== Later life ==
Oxspring retired to Lincolnshire where he wrote his autobiography, Spitfire Command, which was published in 1984 by William Kimber & Co. His final years were marred by a prolonged illness and he died on 8 August 1989. He is buried at Cranwell Parish church, Lincolnshire. His medals, which in addition to his DFC with two bars, AFC and Airman's Cross, included the 1939–1945 Star with Battle of Britain clasp, the Air Crew Europe Star with France and Germany clasp, the Africa Star with North Africa 1942-43 clasp, the Italy Star, the War Medal 1939–1945, and the 1953 Coronation Medal, was put up for auction in 2008 following the death of his wife. They fetched £44,000.
