= Robert Stanford Tuck =

British fighter pilot and test pilot (1916–1987)

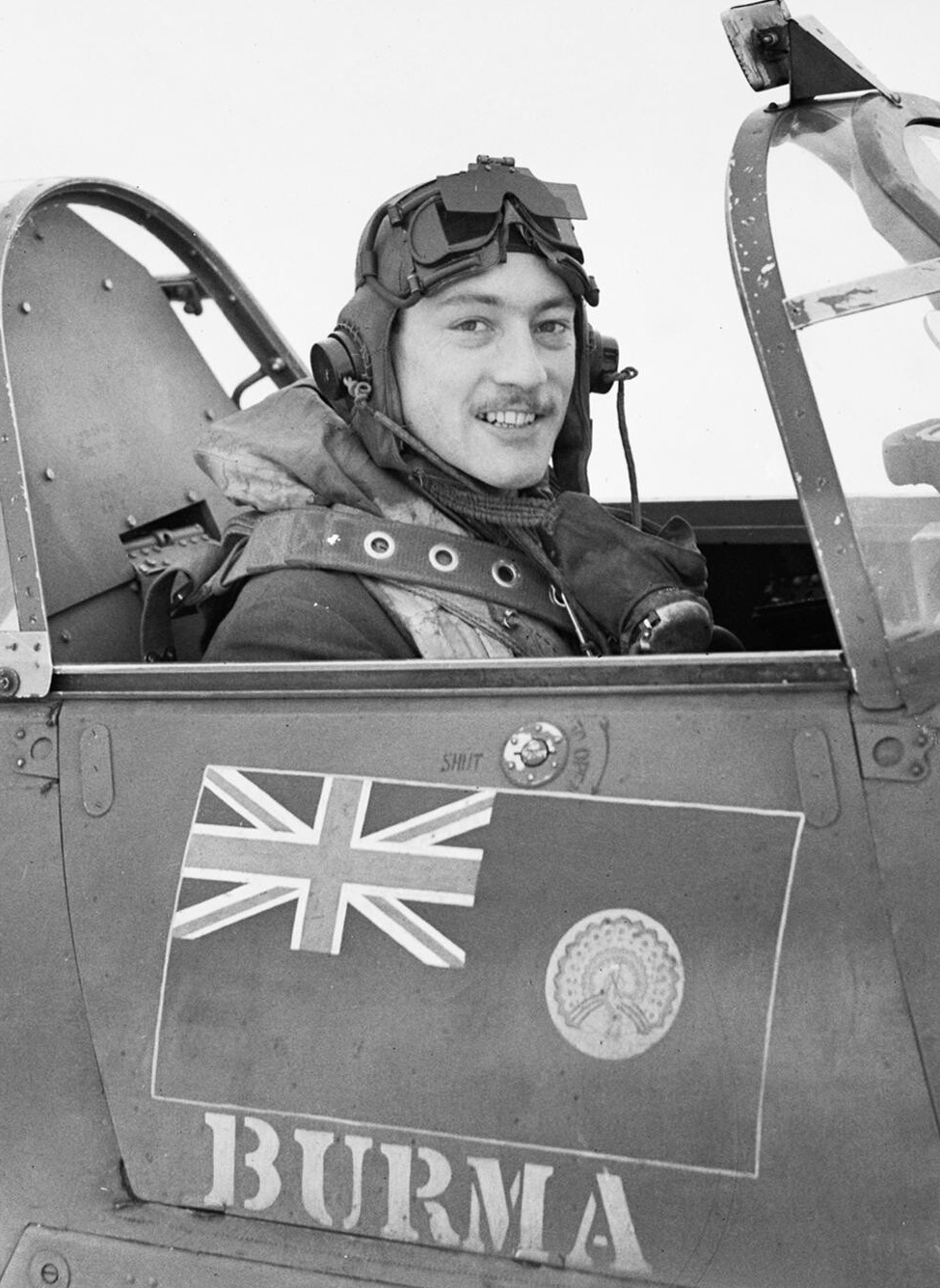
- Stanford Tuck in the cockpit of his Hurricane c. 1940.
- Born: 1 July 1916; Catford, London
- Died: 5 May 1987 (aged 70); Canterbury, Kent
- Military career
- Allegiance: United Kingdom
- Branch: Royal Air Force
- Service years: 1935–1949
- Rank: Wing commander
- Nickname: Bob
- Commands: RAF Coltishall (1947–48); No. 257 Squadron (1940–42)
- Conflicts: Second World War: Battle of France; Battle of Britain; Circus offensive
- Awards: Distinguished Service Order; Distinguished Flying Cross & Two Bars; Air Force Cross; Mentioned in Despatches (3); Distinguished Flying Cross (United States)

Wing Commander Robert Roland Stanford Tuck, DSO, DFC & Two Bars, AFC (1 July 1916 – 5 May 1987) was a British fighter pilot, flying ace and test pilot. Tuck joined the Royal Air Force (RAF) in 1935 and first engaged in combat during the Battle of France, over Dunkirk, claiming his first victories. In September 1940 he was promoted to squadron leader and appointed commander of No. 257 Squadron. In 1941–1942, Tuck participated in fighter sweeps over northern France. On 28 January 1942, he was hit by anti-aircraft fire, was forced to land in France, and was taken prisoner. At the time of his capture, Tuck had claimed 29 enemy aircraft destroyed, two shared destroyed, six probably destroyed, six damaged and one shared damaged.

== Early years ==
Robert Stanford Tuck was born on 1 July 1916 in Catford, southeast London. He was educated at St Dunstan's College and once he finished his schooling in 1932, joined the Merchant Navy as a sea cadet. He was a seaman on the SS Marconi, making a return voyage to South Africa in 1933. He later worked for a window joinery company before joining the RAF on a short service commission as an acting pilot officer in September 1935.

After completing his training at No. 3 Flying Training school at Grantham, Tuck joined No. 65 Squadron in August 1936 as an acting pilot officer on probation. The squadron was based at Hornchurch and was in the process of being equipped with the Gloster Gauntlet bi-plane fighter so much time was spent to become operational on this new type of aircraft. Tuck's pilot officer rank was confirmed in February 1937 with effect from the previous December. Then in May, No. 65 Squadron began to convert to the Gloster Gladiator biplanes. On 17 January 1938, practising formation flying in a Gladiator over the town of Uckfield in East Sussex, Tuck was involved in a fatal mid-air collision with another pilot. Tuck escaped by parachute, with injuries to his face for which he was hospitalised. He was involved in another mid-air collision in April, but this time both pilots were uninjured. In September he was promoted to flying officer.

== Second World War ==
As part of the Hornchurch Wing, No. 65 Squadron, which had been equipped with Supermarine Spitfire fighters since the previous May, was involved with interception duties from the early stages of the Second World War, making its first scramble on 5 September 1939. However, it had seen no action by the time Tuck departed the squadron on 1 May 1940. His new assignment was flight commander at No. 92 Squadron. This was based at Croydon and equipped with Spitfires.

=== Battle of France ===
Tuck led his first combat patrol on 23 May 1940, over Dunkirk, claiming three German fighters shot down. The following day he shot down two German bombers and as aerial fighting intensified over the next two weeks his score rapidly mounted. Tuck was awarded the Distinguished Flying Cross (DFC) on 11 June and received it from King George VI at RAF Hornchurch on 28 June. The citation for this award, published in The London Gazette, read:

"During May 1940 this officer led his flight in company with his squadron on two offensive patrols over Northern France. As a result of one of these patrols in which the squadron engaged a formation of some 60 enemy aircraft, the Squadron Commander was later reported missing, and the flight commander wounded and in hospital. Flight Lieutenant Tuck assumed command, and on the following day led the squadron, consisting of only eight aircraft, on a further patrol engaging an enemy formation of fifty aircraft. During these engagements the squadron has shot down ten enemy aircraft and possibly another twenty-four. Throughout the combats this officer has displayed great dash and gallantry.

— London Gazette, No. 34870, 11 June 1940

=== Battle of Britain ===
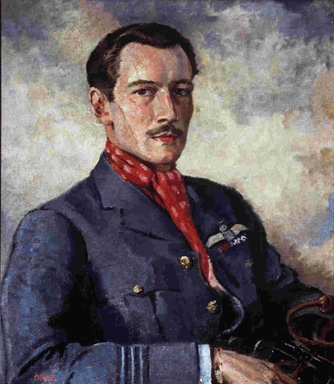
Bob Stanford Tuck, colour painting by Cuthbert Orde, 1941

His combat successes continued into July and August as the Battle of Britain gathered pace, although he himself was forced to bail out on 18 August. While attacking a formation of Junkers Ju 88s over Kent, he shot one down and damaged another. However, during a head-on attack, when he overtook one of the Ju88s, cannon shells hit his Spitfire and he was forced to bail out near Tunbridge Wells. He fell at Tucks Cottage, near Park Farm, Horsmonden. (Note: Forrester states that it was near the Plovers Estate of Lord Cornwallis at Horsmonden, Kent.) In another incident on 25 August, Tuck's Spitfire was badly damaged during combat with a Dornier Do 17 bomber, which he destroyed 15 miles off the coast. His aircraft had a dead engine, but he glided it back to dry land and made a forced landing.

On 11 September, during the height of the Battle of Britain, Tuck was promoted to acting squadron leader and posted to command the Hawker Hurricane-equipped No. 257 Squadron RAF, based at RAF Coltishall (his substantive rank had been raised to flight lieutenant on 3 September). He led his squadron into combat through September and continued to claim further victories. His last two official victories of the Battle were on 28 October, where he claimed two "probable" Bf 109s. He received a Bar to his DFC on 25 October. The official citation for his second DFC, published in the London Gazette reads:

Since 11 June 1940, this officer has destroyed six enemy aircraft, and probably destroyed or damaged six more. One day in August 1940, he attacked three Junkers 88's, destroyed two and damaged the third. Later in the month he intercepted two Ju 88's at 15,000 feet, and in a head-on attack, destroyed one. In a similar attack on the second, a cannon shell blew away his oil and glycol tank and a piece of his propeller, but he reached the coast and landed by parachute. In September 1940, he shot down one Messerschmitt 110 and probably a Messerschmitt 109, and one week later destroyed a Bf 109 over the sea. Flight Lieutenant Tuck has displayed gallant and determined leadership.

— London Gazette, No. 34978, 25 October 1940

The identity of this later victory, achieved on 23 September 1940, is believed by one source to be the future German ace Hans-Joachim Marseille. Flying Bf 109 E-7, Werknummer (W.Nr) 5094, Marseille was pursued to the Cap Gris-Nez area near Calais, France, and forced to take to his parachute. He was later rescued by a Heinkel He 59 float plane. Tuck was credited with the destruction of W.Nr. 5094, whose pilot, Marseille, was the only recorded German airman rescued in the location on that date. Tuck's official claim was for a Bf 109 destroyed off Griz Nez at 09:45—the only pilot to submit a claim in that location. Another source states that Pilot Officer George Bennions from No. 41 Squadron RAF dispatched Marseille. This same source credits Tuck with a victory over Oberleutnant Walter Radlick of III. Gruppe of Jagdgeschwader 53.

=== Fighter sweeps ===
In January 1941, Tuck was awarded the Distinguished Service Order (DSO) and the citation published in the London Gazette read:

This officer has commanded his squadron with great success, and his outstanding leadership, courage and skill have been reflected in its high morale and efficiency. Since 4 October 1940, he has destroyed four hostile aircraft, bringing his total victories to at least eighteen.

— London Gazette, No. 35037, 7 January 1941

In March 1941, Tuck was awarded a second Bar to his DFC, the citation published in the London Gazette reading:

This officer has displayed conspicuous gallantry and initiative in searching for and attacking enemy raiders, often in adverse weather conditions. Since December 1940, he has destroyed three enemy bombers and one fighter, thus bringing his total victories to twenty two.

— London Gazette, No. 35134, 11 April 1941

In June 1941, Tuck survived being shot down over the English Channel, being rescued by a Gravesend coal barge. Tuck claimed a total of seven destroyed, four probables and two damaged on the Hawker Hurricane.

Tuck had an extraordinary piece of ill-fortune when he intercepted a German bomber heading towards Cardiff. He fired at extreme range in poor light, causing it to jettison its bombs in open countryside instead of on the city. The last of its stick of bombs caught one corner of an army training camp and killed one soldier. The soldier was the husband of Tuck's sister.

Having already been the subject of one of Cuthbert Orde's iconic charcoal drawing portraits in September 1940, Tuck sat for a second picture by Orde – this time a full colour oil painting – in 1941.

In July 1941, Tuck was promoted to acting wing commander and appointed wing leader at RAF Duxford, where he led fighter sweeps into northern France. After a brief trip to America with Adolph Malan and Harry Broadhurst to evaluate lend-lease aircraft and train American pilots, he returned to a posting at RAF Biggin Hill as wing leader, from where he flew his last missions.

=== Prisoner of war ===
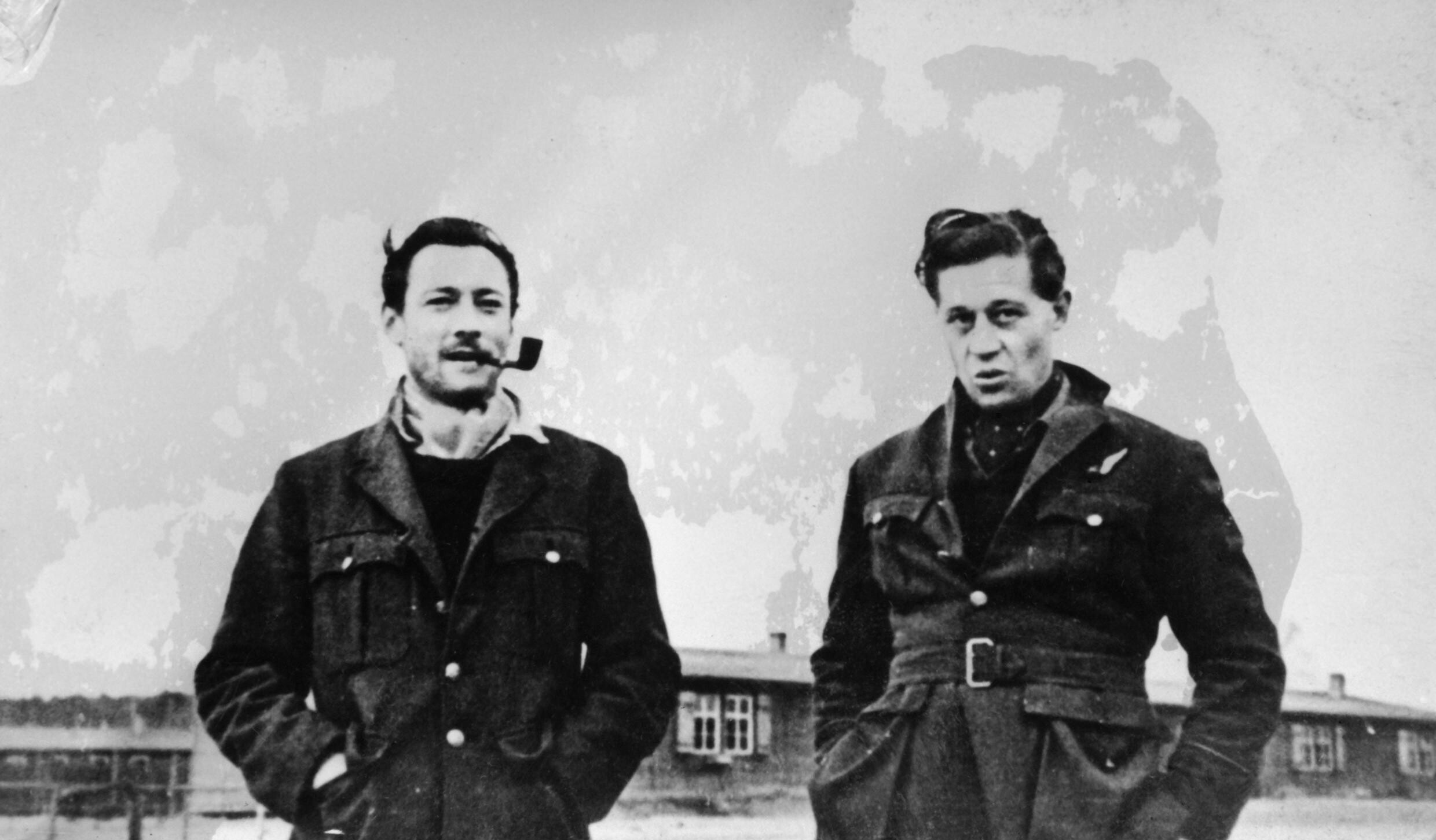
Tuck in captivity at Stalag Luft III, with Roger Bushell

Tuck's final wartime mission occurred on 28 January 1942, when he was shot down over Northern France while on a low-level fighter sweep known as a "Rhubarb" mission over northern France. After his Spitfire was hit by enemy ground-based flak near Boulogne, forcing him to crash land, he was captured by the German troops he had been firing upon just before his aircraft was hit.

Tuck later recorded he feared for his life as their mood was very hostile. However, he noted his "Tuck's luck" came to his rescue when his captors spotted that, by remarkable chance, one of his 20mm cannon shells had gone precisely down the barrel of a similar-sized ground weapon before exploding. This had caused the barrel of the German gun to peel open "like a banana". The German troops thought this was so hilarious that, in their enthusiasm to slap his back in congratulations saying "Good shooting Tommy!", they were actually trampling the bodies of their dead comrades.

Tuck was first sent to the Stalag Luft III prisoner-of-war camp at Żagań (Sagan), where he participated in some of the early planning for the Great Escape but was moved to Belaria, a subcamp of Stalag Luft III, before the mass breakout happened in March 1944. He remained at Belaria until he finally escaped from captivity along with the Polish RAF Battle of Britain ace, Zbigniew "Zbishek" Kustrzyński, on 1 February 1945 by hiding in a barn during the westward march. They finally found the advancing Russian front line where Kustrzynski's Russian, learned from his childhood in Moscow where his father was a Polish embassy official, was crucial to their being accepted by the battle-weary Russian soldiers. They had to fight alongside the Russian troops until they were eventually transported to Odessa, where they boarded a ship to Southampton, England.

== Post-war RAF career ==
Tuck's squadron leader rank was made permanent in September 1945, and he became a temporary wing commander in April 1946. He received his final decoration, the American Distinguished Flying Cross, on 14 June 1946 "in recognition of distinguished services rendered in connection with the war". Having had his permanent rank made up to wing commander in July 1947, he retired from the RAF and active service on 13 May 1949. His final accredited aerial kills numbered 27 (plus two shared) destroyed, one (plus one shared) unconfirmed destroyed, six probables and six (plus one shared) damaged.

== Later life ==
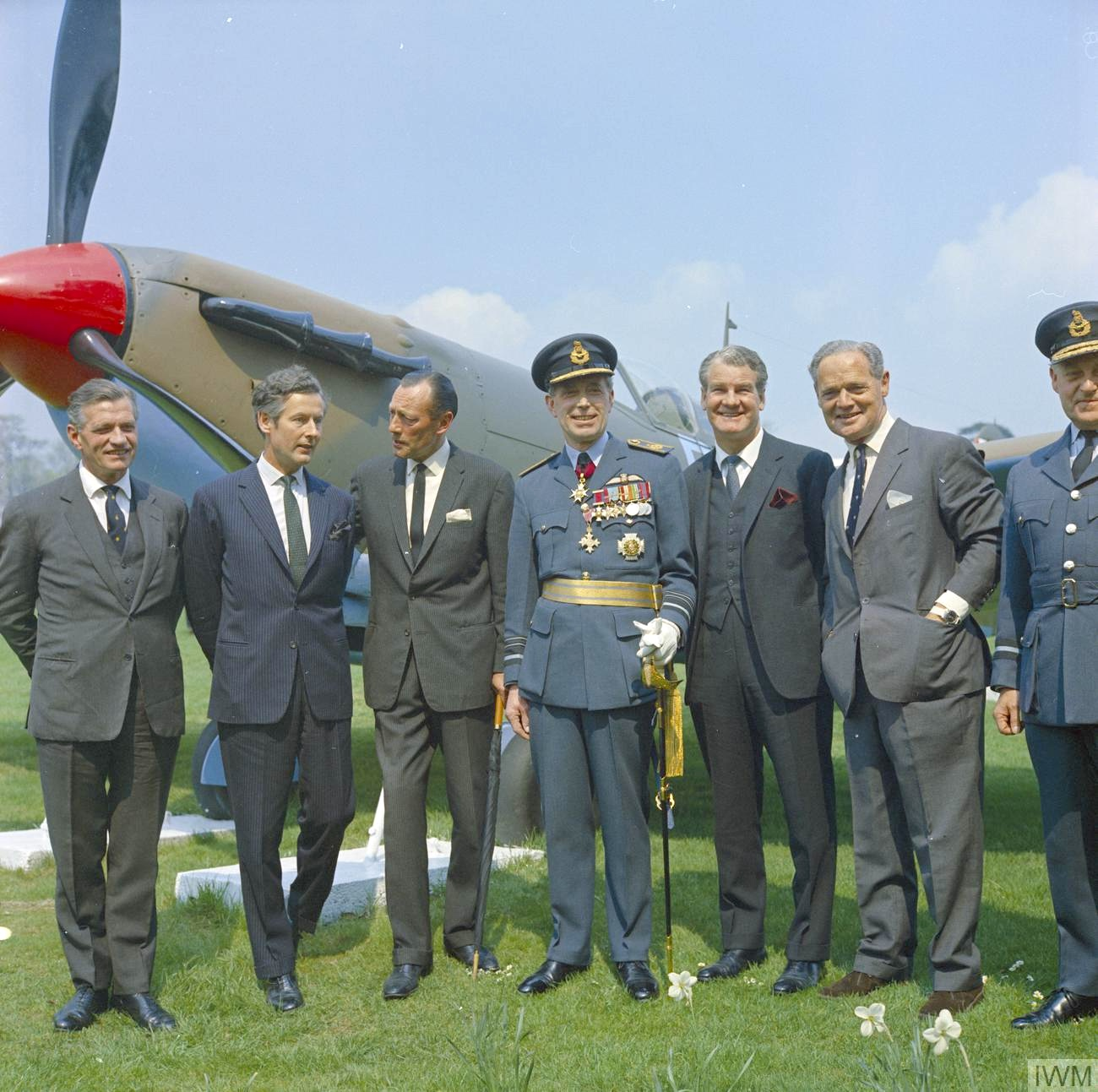
Tuck with several other World War II aces, 1968

Returning to civilian life, Tuck worked for the aircraft manufacturer English Electric until 1955. He and his wife Joyce, whom he married in 1945, then moved to The Lynch at Eastry with their family where he started a mushroom farm. The following year he was the subject of an episode of This Is Your Life and his biography Fly For Your Life, written by Larry Forrester, was published. He retired to Sandwich Bay in the 1970s, where he was a member of St. George's Golf Club.

Tuck also worked as a technical adviser to the 1969 film Battle of Britain. He had already developed a friendship with the German fighter ace Adolf Galland, who was also a technical advisor to the film. Tuck became the godfather of Galland's son Andreas Hubertus, born 7 November 1966.

Robert Stanford Tuck died on 5 May 1987 at the age of 70.

== Memorials ==
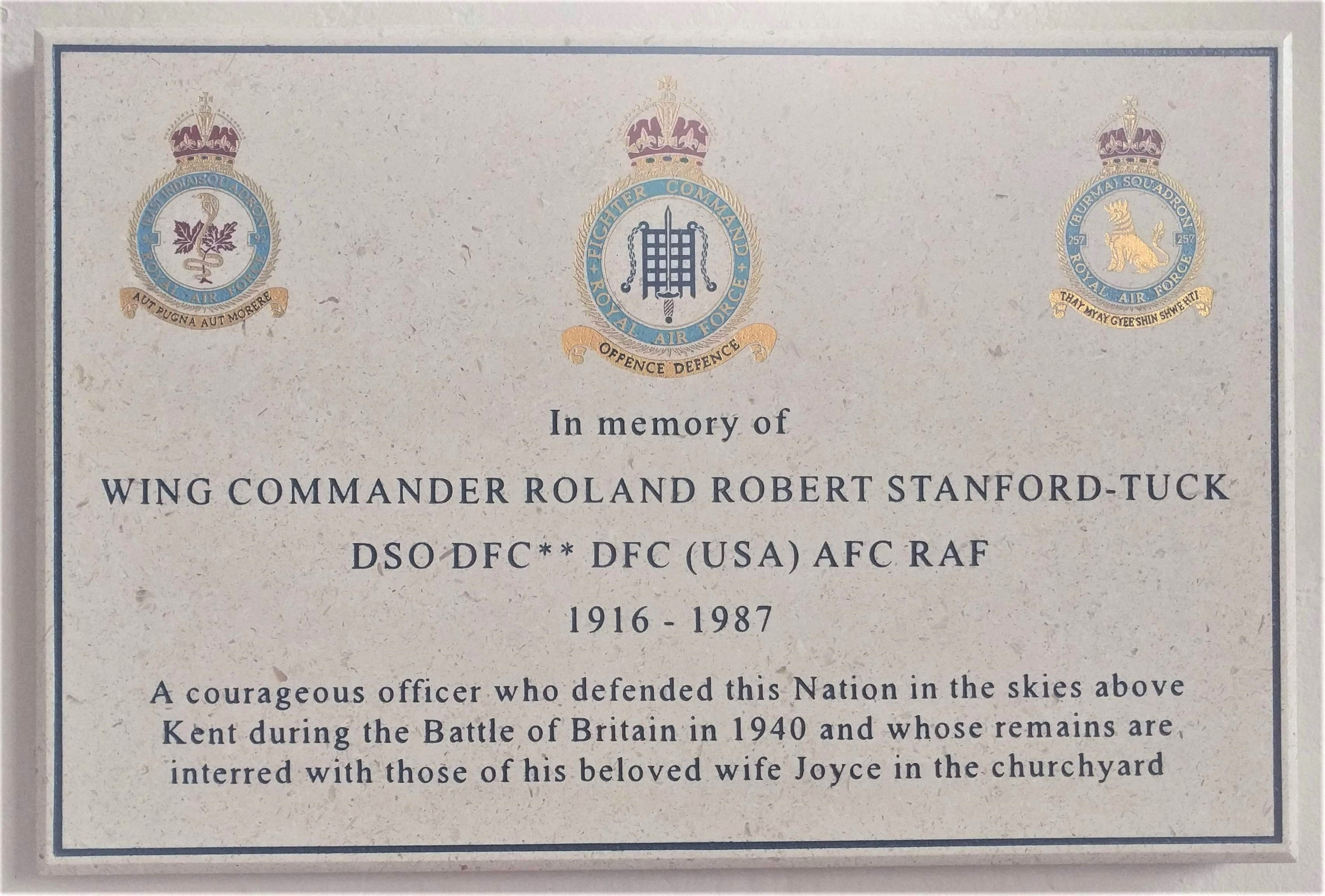
Plaque in St Clement's Church, Sandwich, Kent

On 9 May 2008, a plaque was unveiled in Tuck's memory at the Parish Church of St Clement, Sandwich, Kent. It reads: "In memory of Wing Commander Roland Robert Stanford-Tuck DSO DFC** DFC(USA) AFC RAF. 1916–1987. A courageous officer who defended this nation in the skies above Kent during the Battle of Britain in 1940 and whose remains are interred with those of his beloved wife Joyce in the Churchyard".

Military offices
Preceded by Aleksander Gabszewicz	Commanding Officer RAF Coltishall; 1946–1948	Succeeded by Denis Spotswood
