= Sydney Philip Smith =

- Born: 10 May 1896; Aldershot, Hampshire, England
- Died: 6 April 1918 (aged 21) (KIA); Villers-Bretonneux, Somme, France
- Burial place: Arras Flying Services Memorial, Pas de Calais, France
- Military career
- Allegiance: United Kingdom
- Branch: British Army
- Service years: 1914–1918
- Rank: Captain
- Units: Army Service Corps; No. 6 Squadron RFC; No. 46 Squadron RFC
- Conflicts: World War I • Western Front
- Awards: Distinguished Service Order; Croix de Guerre (France)

Captain Sydney Philip Smith DSO, (10 May 1896 – 6 April 1918) was a British First World War flying ace, who was credited with five aerial victories, before being shot down and killed, the 76th victory of Manfred von Richthofen.

== Military service ==
Smith was born in Aldershot, and educated at King's College School, Wimbledon, where he joined the Officers' Training Corps and was reportedly a crack shot, captaining his school rifle team at the annual schools competition at Bisley. He enlisted at the outbreak of war in the Public Schools Battalion, before being commissioned as a temporary second lieutenant of the Army Service Corps in December 1914. Smith served with the Wessex Divisional Train, going to France in March 1915.

Smith qualified as a pilot on 24 May 1916, and on 14 June was seconded to Royal Flying Corps, and appointed a flying officer. He was posted to No. 6 Squadron to fly the Royal Aircraft Factory BE.2d.

He wrote home to his father in October 1916;

"A letter by way of a change this time. Things have been happening with a vengeance since I returned. I daresay you heard from the aunts about some of 'em: my observer getting a "Blighty" in the leg; fellows being blown to pieces by bombs, etc., etc. Well the day after I brought down Captain Duff wounded, I went up in the same machine on a "Shoot" with another observer, and got it in the neck properly from "Archie": my propeller was smashed, petrol tank punctured [emptied itself all over my observer's feet in about 2 seconds!], both main spars of the two top planes split right through, engine cowl pierced and about 27 holes in other parts of the machine. This was all from 2 practically simultaneous bursts dead over the machine, and they sounded like the crack of doom! However, we managed to struggle painfully back to the aerodrome, feeling jolly lucky that there was enough propeller left to drag us back and also that the spare petrol tank was intact [machine is still in the process of rebuilding!!]..."

He was appointed a flight commander with the acting rank of captain on 22 December 1916. Despite piloting a grossly obsolescent two-seater reconnaissance aircraft, Smith, and his observer Air Mechanic 2nd Class Backhouse, scored his first victory on 17 March 1917, destroying a German Albatros D.II fighter over Becelaere. On 1 May 1917, piloting RE-8 "4196" with Observer Lieutenant Hayman, Smith was attacked by five Albatros scouts, and wounded in the right heel during the engagement. This was referred to in a letter sent to his father from Second Lieutenant Waight, in May 1917:

"He was attacked by five hostile machines, all firing as hard as they could go. Unfortunately, Phillip could not reply as both his and the Observer's gun jammed, and were therefore helpless. Phillip did the only thing possible under the circumstances and endeavoured to out manoeuvre his opponents, which he did with wonderful skill. An unlucky shot hit Phillip in the right heel, which must have been very painful when he used the rudder controls. However he kept going until his engine was hit in the carburettor and engine bearers, which, of course, forced him to land. In spite of his wound he made a perfect landing. He was taken to the dressing station ... He is known by many officers outside the Flying Corps for the many brave deeds he has performed at various times, which he considers very ordinary things. He was, without a doubt, a very brave man, and that means a very great deal in the Flying Corps ... He has been recommended four times for a decoration and all in this Squadron are intensely annoyed as he has not got it up to the present..."

Smith was promoted to lieutenant on 1 July 1917. Recovered from his wound, Smith transferred to No. 46 Squadron flying the Sopwith Camel in March 1918. He shared a pair of claims on 16 March 1918, being aided by George Thomson. After another claim on 24 March, he shared his final victory, an Albatros C, on 2 April with Lieutenants Donald MacLaren and Alexander Vlasto, and Second Lieutenant Roy McConnell.

"Whilst on C.O.P. at 5,000 feet over Courcelles, Captain Smith fired 50 rounds at 200 yards range at E.A. who was flying West at 1000 feet above him. E.A. turned East and dived. Captain Smith and the other pilots got on his tail and dived down on him firing about 750 rounds at a range varying from 50 to 100 yards. E.A. then dived vertically as if hit and Captain Smith overshot him, the other pilots, with the exception of Lieutenant McClaren, pulled out. He fired another 100 rounds at 50 yards range and the E.A. went down out of control and crashed S. of Courcelles."

His commanding officer at No. 46 Squadron, Major R. H. S. Mealing, described Smith as "wonderfully brave, perhaps too brave". Twice he had returned with his Camel badly damaged by ground fire; "D6407" on 27 March and "D6489" on 30 March.

On 6 April 1918, flying Camel "D6491", he led a ground attack mission with Lieutenants R. K. MacConnell, J. R. Cole, and V. M. Yeates. They attacked troops and transports near La Motte, dropping sixteen 25-pound (11 kg) Cooper bombs and firing some 450 rounds of ammunition. However, Smith did not return and was last seen by MacConnell at 15.30 hours over La Motte.

Smith fell to the guns of a Fokker Dr.I flown by Manfred von Richthofen. The Red Baron's combat report read, "...The English plane which I attacked started to burn after only a few shots from my guns. Then it crashed, burning near the little wood northeast of Villers Bretonneux, where it continued burning on the ground."

He was listed as "missing in action" by the Air Ministry. After the war Smith's father, determined to find his son's remains, travelled to France with former Camel pilot Donald Gold, who had witnessed the shooting down of Smith's aircraft. Although they were successful in locating and mapping the crash position and found several pieces of the Camel's wreckage, he was unable to discover any trace of his son. As Smith has no known grave he is commemorated on the Arras Flying Services Memorial.

Smith was later featured in No. 46 Squadron comrade Victor Maslin Yeates' wartime classic novel Winged Victory as the character 'Beal'.
