= Cecil Marchant =

Cecil James Marchant
- Born: 15 June 1895; London, England
- Died: 30 May 1965 (aged 69)
- Military career
- Allegiance: United Kingdom
- Branch: British Army; Royal Air Force
- Service years: 1913–1919
- Rank: Captain
- Nickname: "Chaps"
- Units: King's Own Yorkshire Light Infantry; The Duke of Cambridge's Own (Middlesex Regiment); No 46 Squadron RFC/No. 46 Squadron RAF
- Conflicts: World War I; Western Front
- Awards: Military Cross

Captain Cecil James Marchant MC (15 June 1895 – 30 May 1965) was an English flying ace during World War I. He was credited with nine aerial victories.

== Early life and military career ==
Cecil James Marchant was born in London, and enlisted into the Army in 1913, when he was 18 years old. He served in the 2nd Battalion, King's Own Yorkshire Light Infantry, and had achieved the rank of sergeant by 8 October 1914, when he received a mention in despatches from the Commander-in-Chief, Field-Marshal Sir John French. He was commissioned as a second lieutenant in the 14th Battalion, The Duke of Cambridge's Own (Middlesex Regiment) on 22 July 1915.

== Flying service ==
Marchant served about 18 months in the trenches, before being transferred to the Royal Flying Corps. He was granted Royal Aero Club Aviator's Certificate No. 3971 on 1 August 1916, and was appointed a flying officer the same day, as was customary on completion of pilot training, and transferred to the General List.

His first assignment was as a Sopwith Pup pilot in No. 46 Squadron in early 1917. He was promoted to lieutenant on 1 March 1917. That combat tour ended in June.

On 1 January 1918, Marchant was appointed a flight commander with the temporary rank of captain. He returned to No. 46 Squadron in February 1918, which had been re-equipped with the Sopwith Camel. He scored his first aerial victory on 22 March, and ran his tally to nine over the next 45 days.

He was awarded the Military Cross, which was gazetted on 22 June 1918. His citation read:

Temporary Captain Cecil James Merchant, General List and Royal Flying Corps.

"For conspicuous gallantry and devotion to duty. He, with two other pilots of his squadron, bombed a freight train from a height of 50 feet, three trucks being derailed. Again, on a later occasion he, with five other pilots, bombed and fired at a column of enemy transport with such good effect that three-quarters of the personnel became casualties and most of the vehicles were destroyed. Whilst on a low bombing reconnaissance during the recent operations he brought down two hostile two-seater machines out of control and shot down a third in flames. He has at all times displayed marked gallantry and resource."

On 2 July 1918, Marchant was wounded severely enough to require his removal from combat duty for hospitalization. He was temporarily appointed a 3rd Class Staff Officer in the Air Ministry on 6 October 1918, and again on 10 February 1919. On 20 March 1919, he was appointed an adjutant; this time, he was an acting captain, though drawing the pay and allowances as a lieutenant.

=== List of aerial victories ===
List of aerial victories
| No. | Date/time | Aircraft | Foe | Result | Location | Notes |
|---|---|---|---|---|---|---|
| 1 | 22 March 1918 @1500 hours | Sopwith Camel; Serial number C1554 | LVG reconnaissance aircraft | Driven down out of control | Bullecourt | Victory shared with Donald Roderick MacLaren |
| 2 | 23 March 1918 @1015 hours | Sopwith Camel s/n B9211 | Reconnaissance aircraft | Driven down out of control | Croisilles | |
| 3 | 23 March 1918 @1030 hours | Sopwith Camel s/n B9211 | Reconnaissance aircraft | Set afire; destroyed | Mory | |
| 4 | 23 March 1918 @1410 hours | Sopwith Camel | Albatros D.V | Driven down out of control | Morchies | |
| 5 | 3 April 1918 @1245 hours | Sopwith Camel s/n B9211 | Albatros reconnaissance aircraft | Destroyed | Map grid 57 D L32 | Victory shared with Maurice Freehill |
| 6 | 20 April 1918 @1000 hours | Sopwith Camel s/n B9211 | Albatros reconnaissance aircraft | Destroyed | Harnes | Victory shared with Maurice Freehill |
| 7 | 25 April 1918 | Sopwith Camel | LVG reconnaissance aircraft | Destroyed | West of Lens | Victory shared with Philip Tudhope |
| 8 | 2 May 1918 @1700 hours | Sopwith Camel s/n B9211 | Pfalz D.III | Driven down out of control | Estaires | Victory shared with John Henry Smith |
| 9 | 6 May 1918 @1800 hours | Sopwith Camel | DFW reconnaissance aircraft | Captured | Saint-Venant | Victory shared with Victor Yeates, John Henry Smith, Donald Roderick MacLaren, H T W Manwaring |

== Post World War I ==
Postwar, Marchant worked in his family's business. He was also a prime mover in organising squadron reunions.

Cecil James Marchant died on 30 May 1965.

== Bibliography ==
- Shores, Christopher F.; Franks, Norman & Guest, Russell F. (1990). Above the Trenches: a Complete Record of the Fighter Aces and Units of the British Empire Air Forces 1915–1920. London, UK: Grub Street. ISBN 978-0-948817-19-9.
