= Roy McConnell =

Roy McConnell may refer to:

- Roy McConnell (footballer) (1927–2003), Australian rules footballer
- Roy McConnell (RAF officer) (1898–1987), Canadian World War I flying ace
