= Philip Tudhope =

Philip Murray Tudhope
- Born: 27 September 1898; Orange Free State
- Died: Unknown
- Military career
- Allegiance: Union of South Africa
- Branch: Aviation
- Rank: Lieutenant
- Unit: No. 46 Squadron RAF
- Awards: Distinguished Flying Cross

Lieutenant Philip Murray Tudhope (born 27 September 1898, date of death unknown) was a World War I flying ace credited with six aerial victories.

Tudhope joined the Royal Flying Corps in May 1917. On 3 March 1918, he was assigned to 46 Squadron. On 25 April 1918, he joined with Captain Cecil Marchant and Lieutenant E. Smith to destroy an LVG two-seater reconnaissance plane. He then set afire a Pfalz D.III on 30 May. His last four victories were "out of control" wins over Fokker D.VIIs. The last two of these, on 17 September, were during a melee, and were shared with Captain Donald MacLaren and four other RAF pilots; the Fokkers fell and collided with one another.

== Honors and awards ==
For his actions in France, Tudhope received the Distinguished Flying Cross in 1919. The citation read:

"On 18 October this officer displayed marked presence of mind and initiative. Seeing an enemy battery proceeding along a road towards a town which he knew was held by our troops, Lieut. Tudhope descended to a low altitude to accelerate its progress. So successful was this manoeuvre that the leading gun was driven into the hands of our infantry and captured; the remainder wheeled about and retired, pursued by this officer."
