= Winged Victory (novel) =

1934 novel by Victor Maslin Yeates

- Author: V. M. Yeates
- Language: English
- Genre: War novel, Historical fiction
- Publisher: Jonathan Cape
- Publication date: 1934
- Publication place: England

Winged Victory is a 1934 novel by English World War I fighter pilot Victor Maslin Yeates that is widely regarded as a classic description of aerial combat and the futility of war.

== Basic structure ==
The novel concerns World War I, the existence pilots lead and the fear involved in flying early biplanes. Its protagonist, Tom Cundall, plans to leave the Royal Air Force when his service is up and live on a West Country farm with his friends. However, by the time he is due to leave the Air Force, all his friends have "gone west". This leaves him a broken man. The narrative combination of action, pathos, humour and humility set against the huge casualties of the RAF in 1918 makes Winged Victory one of the classics of Great War literature.

The book is semi-autobiographical, V. M. Yeates having served with 46 Squadron flying Sopwith Camels in 1918 and also having lost all his friends in the war. T. E. Lawrence praised it on its release with the words "Admirable, admirable, admirable. One of the most distinguished histories of the war ... masterly". However, it went out of print due to a lack of a publisher and was soon forgotten. Yeates died in 1934 from tuberculosis.

It had a resurgence in popularity with RAF pilots during World War II because of its accurate descriptions of air warfare. The book was reissued with a new preface and a tribute by Henry Williamson in 1961 (it was Williamson who encouraged Yeates to complete the book after World War I). It was reprinted in 1972 in paperback by Richard Clay (The Chaucer Press) Ltd., and republished in paperback in 2004. Yeates wrote in the flyleaf of Williamson's copy of Winged Victory that: "I started [writing the book] in April 1933 in Colindale Hospital. I could not write there, so walked out one morning, the doctor threatening death. I wrote daily till the end of the year. My chief difficulty was to compromise between truth and art, for I was writing a novel that was to be an exact reproduction of the period and an exact analysis and synthesis of a state of mind."

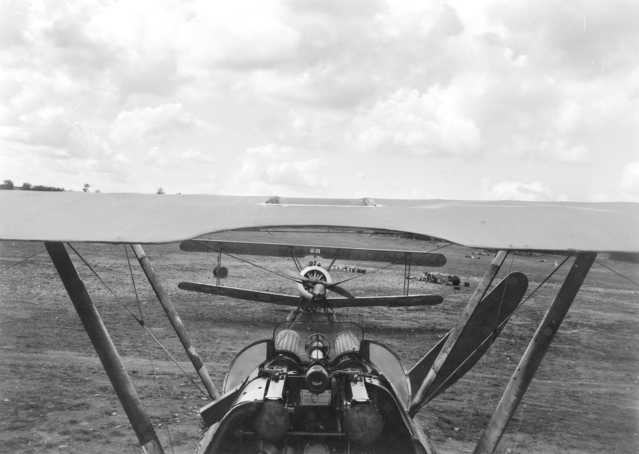
Pilot's view from cockpit of Sopwith Camel.

== Descriptions of aerial combat ==
Winged Victory features depictions of World War I aerial combat.
"They flew over the ghastly remains of Villers-Bretonneux which were still being tortured by bursting shells upspurting in columns of smoke and debris that stood solid for a second and then floated fading away in the wind. All along the line from Hamel to Hangard Wood the whiter puff-balls of shrapnel were appearing and fading multitudinously and incessantly ... A flaming meteor fell out of a cloud close by them and plunged earthwards. It was an aeroplane going down in flames from some fight above the clouds. Where it fell the atmosphere was stained by a thanatognomonic black streak ... Tom sitting there in the noise and the hard wind had the citied massy earth his servant tumbler, waiting upon his touch of stick or rudder for its guidance; instantly responding, ready to leap and frisk a lamb-planet amid the steady sun-bound sheep ... Some of the cloud peaks thrust up to ten thousand feet; in the blue fields beyond there was an occasional flash of a tilting wing reflecting the sun. Mac climbed as fast as he could. In a few minutes they were at ten thousand, and the Huns, a mile above them, were discernable as aeroplanes, bluely translucent ... Rattle of guns and flash of tracers and the Fokker in a vertical turn, red, with extension on the top planes. Tom hated those extensions. He was doing a very splitarse turn for a Hun, but tracers seemed to be finding him. Got him, oh got him: over, flopping over, nose dropping, spinning."

== Philosophy about war ==
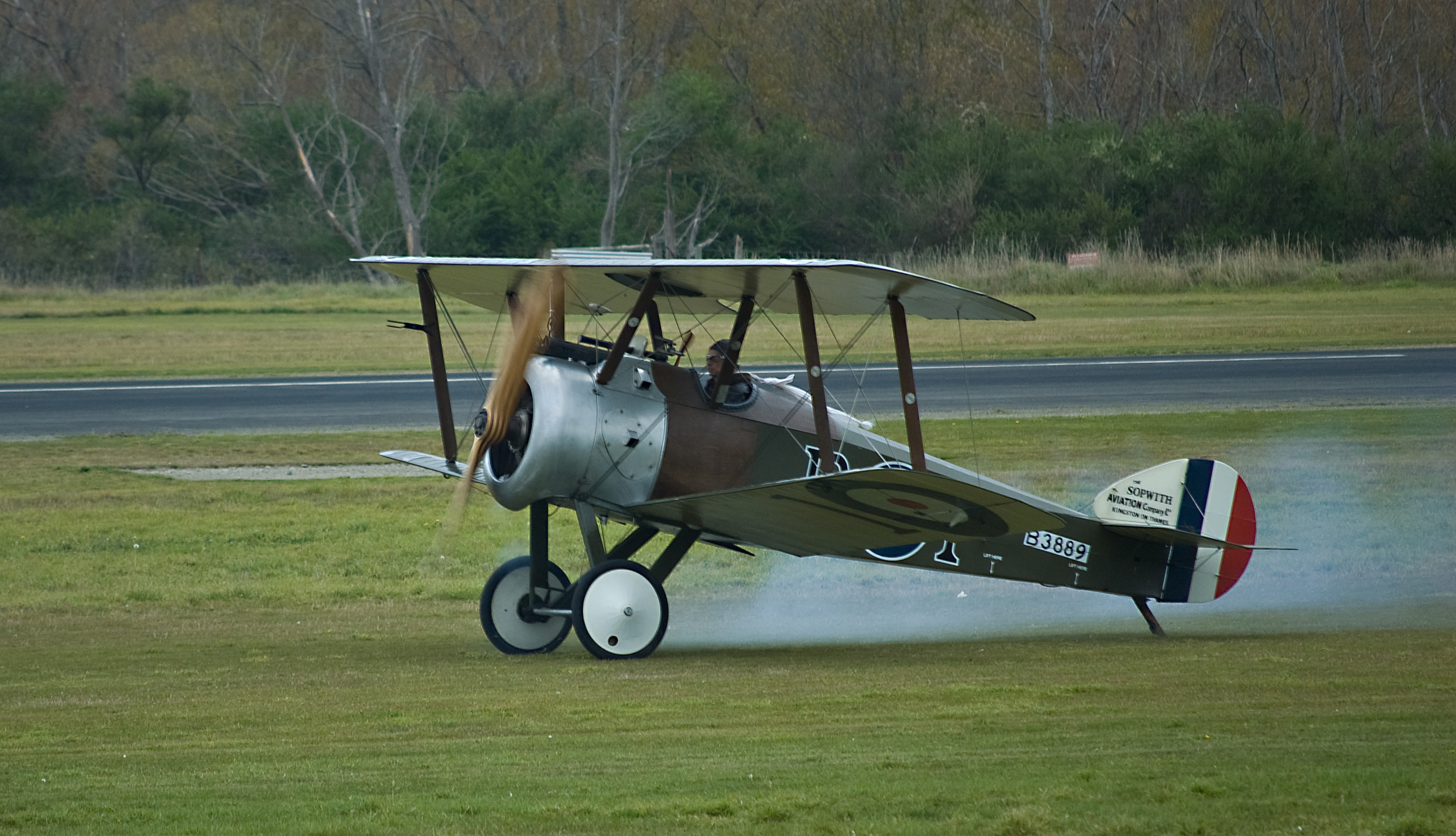
Sopwith Camel, the type of First World War aircraft flown by VM Yeates

In Winged Victory some characters offer a prescient and pessimistic view of the causes of war, far removed from the jingoism of many of Yeates' contemporary writers: "For there's one thing financiers cannot or will not see. They have visions of a frontierless world in which their operations will proceed without hindrance and make all human activities dependent on them; but their world is impossible because finance is sterile, and a state living by finance must always have neighbours from which to suck blood, or it is like a dog eating its own tail...an intense war-fever inoculation was carried out by the press. It took rather less than three months, I believe, to make the popular demand for war irresistible...There'll be a famous orgy of money snatching over our bones." Other characters express contrary sentiments - the above argument is rendered a "bitter snarl" by another. Above all, Yeates reproduces the typical arguments of a 1918 RFC mess, and we see the characters portraying a wide and complex range of views about the war.

== Challenging of perceptions of the War in the Air ==
One of the most notable things about Winged Victory is how it challenges the common perception of the war in the air during the First World War, especially when compared with other contemporary fiction. Unlike most other "air" novels of the time (e.g. Biggles ), it fits neatly into the canon of so-called "Disenchantment" novels, which while well regarded in the present day, were largely ignored.

While it acknowledges that there are high scoring aces, who seem invulnerable (notably the character of "Mac"), most of the characters find the war interminably unpleasant, alternatively horrid and dull, enlivened only by regular nihilistic drinking binges. Equally, it acknowledges the serious flaws in allied aircraft by 1918. While many more modern sources (including Wikipedia) list the Sopwith Camel as an excellent, almost unsurpassed aircraft, Yeates, via Cundall, complains that it was too slow, and could not climb high enough - flaws so serious that Cundall's squadron is regularly assigned to ground attack, being covered by SE5as.

The desired aircraft is neither the Camel, not its replacements the Sopwith Snipe or Sopwith Salamander (wrongly assumed by Cundall to be a new fighter variant instead of a ground attack aircraft), but instead the Sopwith Dolphin. This tellingly reveals that pilots such as Yeates and his contemporaries in 46 squadron valued height, and the concurrent ability to strike unseen, running counter to the common image of swirling dogfights.

== Trivia ==
The title, "Winged Victory", was not Yeates' choice - it was forced on him by his original publisher, who wanted the book to appear more patriotic and exciting. Yeates' original choice of title was the much more apt, bleaker "Wingless Victor".

Yeates was credited with five enemy aircraft shot down in World War I (2 + 3 shared). Some of the characters of the book have real names of pilots who served in 46 Squadron at the time, like ace George Edwin Thomson (21 enemy aircraft shot down, called "Tommy" in the book, and who is transferred to Home Establishment before April 1918), Harry Noel Cornforth Robinson (called "Robinson" in the book, 10 aircraft destroyed), and Horace Gilbert Wanklyn Debenham ("Debenham" in the book, six enemy aircraft destroyed). There are some with names very similar to real names, like Flight Commander "MacAndrews (Mac)" who is based upon Canadian ace Donald MacLaren (48 enemy aircraft and six balloons shot down), who served in 46 Squadron at the time.

Curiously, the Sphere Books 1969 edition of the book and the subsequent Mayflower Books 1972 edition have an illustration of SE5as dogfighting with Fokker D.VIIs on the cover when the only aircraft the main characters fly is the Sopwith Camel. (The 1974 Mayflower reprint shows Sopwith Camels). The 1962 reprint of the Jonathan Cape edition, however, has a fly leaf with two Sopwith Camels depicted.

It was a large inspiration in the work of Derek Robinson, particularly the 1971 Booker Prize-nominated Goshawk Squadron.
