= Freehill =

Freehill is a surname. Notable people with the surname include:

- Francis Freehill (1854–1908), Australian solicitor and activist
- Mary Freehill (born 1946), Lord Mayor of Dublin
- Maurice Freehill (1899–1939), British World War I flying ace
