= Roy McConnell (RAF officer) =

Roy Kirkwood McConnell
- Born: 19 December 1898; Victoria, British Columbia, Canada
- Died: 22 November 1987 (aged 88)
- Military career
- Allegiance: Canada
- Branch: Aviation
- Service years: 1917-1919; 1940-1945
- Rank: Squadron Leader
- Unit: No. 46 Squadron RAF
- Awards: Distinguished Flying Cross
- Other work: Returned to service during World War II

Squadron Leader Roy Kirkwood McConnell (19 December 1898 – 22 November 1987) was a World War I flying ace from Canada credited with seven aerial victories. His award of the Distinguished Flying Cross noted both aerial victories, as well as gallantry in hazardous ground attack missions.

He returned to his native Canada in 1919, and made his living in the business world until 1940. He then returned to military service, joining the Royal Canadian Air Force in a junior rank and rapidly rising to become a squadron leader. After holding crucial posts in training aviators for the war effort, he was medically discharged in April 1945.

== Early life ==
Roy Kirkwood McConnell was born 19 December 1898 in Victoria, British Columbia, Canada. He graduated from Victoria High School, British Columbia in 1916. He was a student when he enlisted into military service on 1 May 1917 in Victoria. He named his next of kin as Thomas McConnell. After joining the military, the younger McConnell stayed in Canada until August 1917.

== World War I ==
After shipping to the British Isles, McConnell underwent aviation training that began on 14 September 1917 at Ternhill, England. After completion of training, he was assigned to No. 46 Squadron of the Royal Flying Corps on 11 November 1917. He would not score his first aerial victory until 23 March 1918. By 8 September 1918, he had run his string to seven wins. On 16 September 1918, he was withdrawn from combat and posted to the Home Establishment in England. He was awarded a Distinguished Flying Cross on 28 September 1918.

== List of aerial victories ==
See also Aerial victory standards of World War I

No.	Date/time	Aircraft	Foe	Result	Location	Notes
1	23 March 1918 @ 1410 hours	Sopwith Camel serial number C1572	Albatros D.V	Driven down out of control	Morchies, France	
2	2 April 1918 @ 1245 hours	Sopwith Camel	German two-seater	Destroyed	Courcelles	Victory shared with Donald MacLaren, Sydney Philip Smith, two other aces
3	4 May 1918 @ 1800 hours	Sopwith Camel s/n C1643	Albatros D.V	Driven down out of control	North of Bullecourt, France	Victory shared with Donald MacLaren, another pilot
4	8 July 1918 @ 0530 hours	Sopwith Camel s/n D9407	Fokker D.VII	Driven down out of control	Fromelles, France	Victory shared with Donald MacLaren
5	1 August 1918 @ 1200 hours	Sopwith Camel s/n D6693	German two-seater	Destroyed	Armentières, France	Victory shared with Donald MacLaren, two other pilots
6	3 August 1918 @ 1835 hours	Sopwith Camel s/n C9411	Fokker D.VII	Destroyed	East of Lens, France	
7	8 September 1918 @ 0700 hours	Sopwith Camel s/n D6693	Rumpler two-seater	Set afire in midair; destroyed	South of Peronne, France	

== Post World War I ==
McConnell's Distinguished Flying Cross was gazetted on 3 December 1918, with the award citation appearing in the Edinburgh Gazette on the 5th:

"This officer has accounted for five enemy machines—destroying two and driving down three out of control, proving himself a gallant fighting airman. He has also shown conspicuous bravery in attacking troops and transport."

He returned to Canada on 27 February 1919. He was a businessman engaged in sales between the World Wars. However, he joined the Royal Canadian Air Force as a pilot officer in May 1940 to serve in World War II. He was promoted rapidly, rising to Squadron Leader in 1941. He was posted to five different training schools in Canada, holding responsible posts in each. He was medically discharged in April 1945.
