= Clive Brewster-Joske =

Australian fighter pilot (1896–1947)

Clive Alexander Brewster
- Born: Clive Alexander Brewster-Joske; October 1896; Suva, Colony of Fiji
- Died: 23 April 1947 (aged 50); Delhi, British Raj
- Military career
- Allegiance: United Kingdom; Australia
- Branch: Australian Imperial Force; British Army; Royal Air Force; Royal Australian Air Force
- Rank: Group Captain
- Units: 55th Battalion, AIF; No. 1 Squadron RFC; No. 46 Squadron RFC
- Commands: Fiji Defence Force
- Conflicts: World War I; Western Front; World War II
- Awards: Order of the British Empire; Military Cross; Legion d'honneur (France); Order of Saint Olav (Norway)
- Other work: Prominent in civic life of Fiji between the World Wars

Group Captain Clive Alexander Brewster-Joske OBE, MC (October 1896 – 23 April 1947), later known as Clive Brewster, was a Fiji-born British subject of Australian heritage. He became a flying ace during World War I and was credited with eight aerial victories. Upon his return to civil life post-war, he became a leading citizen of Fiji being entrusted by several foreign governments as their consular agent. He returned to service at the beginning of World War II, rising first to the rank of lieutenant colonel, then to that of group captain.

== Early life ==
Clive Alexander Brewster-Joske was born in Fiji in October 1896, the son of Alexander Joske and Emily Undine Joske. He was of Australian heritage, and was educated in Melbourne, Australia. He joined the British Army's 37th Division in September 1914, serving in the Royal Artillery.

== World War I ==
When he was commissioned as a temporary second lieutenant on 15 June 1915, he was serving in the 55th Infantry Battalion of the Australian Imperial Force. He went into combat as an infantry officer in July 1915. On 15 November 1915, he transferred to the Royal Flying Corps from the Motor Machine Gun Service. He learned an observer's duties by performing them; he corrected artillery fire via a wireless transmitter, photographed enemy positions, and manned the observer's machine gun when attacked. He was initially assigned to No. 1 Squadron for these observer's duties. After his first victory claim was not confirmed, he scored his first aerial success on 29 February 1916.

He then trained as a pilot, and on 24 September 1916 was appointed a flying officer from the General List, with the rank of temporary 2nd lieutenant and seniority from 27 February 1916. With effect 1 September 1916, Brewster-Joske was promoted to temporary lieutenant "while serving with R.F.C." by the War Office. He was posted to No. 46 Squadron, with whom he would gain the remainder of his victories, scoring his second on 2 June 1917. In late September 1917, he earned 46 Squadron's first decoration, a Military Cross. The award citation said simply, "For conspicuous gallantry and devotion to duty in taking part in 29 air fights, in which he has destroyed seven hostile machines." The Gazette of 19 September 1917 listed his appointment as a flight commander with the rank of acting captain.

He was withdrawn from combat duty in November 1917, which would have scotched his position as acting captain as he was no longer a flight commander. On 23 June 1918, he was again promoted to acting captain to be employed as a staff officer, serving until the armistice on 11 November 1918.

== List of aerial victories ==
Confirmed victories in the below list are numbered; unconfirmed victories are denoted "u/c".

Combat record
No.	Date/Time	Aircraft/ Serial No.	Opponent	Result	Location	Notes
No. 1 Squadron RFC
u/c	2 January 1916	Vickers Gunbus	Aviatik reconnaissance aircraft		Passchendaele	
1	29 February 1916 @ 1035 hours	Morane Parasol serial number 5119	Aviatik reconnaissance aircraft	Set afire; destroyed	Passchendaele	Pilot: R. A. Saunders. Shared with Frederick Powell.
No. 46 Squadron RFC
2	2 June 1917 @ 1800 hours	Sopwith Pup s/n B1709	Albatros D.III	Driven down out of control	Houthulst	
3	7 June 1917 @ 1030 hours	Sopwith Pup s/n B1709	Albatros D.III	Destroyed	Wervicq-Comines	
4	17 June 1917 @ 1930 hours	Sopwith Pup s/n B1709	Albatros D.V	Driven down out of control	Lens	
5	3 September 1917 @ 1030 hours	Sopwtih Pup s/n B1716	Albatros D.V	Destroyed	Menen	
6	4 September 1917 @ 0800 hours	Sopwith Pup s/n A7335	Albatros D.V	Driven down out of control	East of Menen	
7	16 September 1917 @ 1315 hours	Sopwith Pup s/n A7335	Albatros D.III	Driven down out of control	Écourt-Saint-Quentin	
8	22 September 1917 @ 1015 hours	Sopwith Pup s/n A7335	Albatros D.III	Destroyed	North of Brebières	Shared with Lt. R. L. M. Ferrie.

== Post World War I ==
Brewster-Joske returned to Australia on the Makura in late 1918; his return was reported in the Sydney Morning Herald on 23 December 1918. On 11 April 1919, he was transferred to the unemployed list of the Royal Air Force, officially ending his original stint of military service.

Brewster-Joske returned to Fiji. He became one of its leading citizens. On 24 June 1920, his monarch approved of his service as Consul of Norway at Suva, with jurisdiction covering Fiji, the Gilbert and Ellice Islands, the Solomon Islands, and "other islands within the jurisdiction of His Majesty's High Commissioner for the Western Pacific."

In 1922, his father died in Suva, leaving his mother widowed.

On 17 February 1932, Brewster-Joske was awarded the Legion of Honour by the President of the French Republic for his service as France's consul at Suva.

He must have involved himself with local military affairs, as on 3 June 1935, Major Brewster-Joske of the Fiji Defence Force was awarded the Order of the British Empire for his services.

On 18 February 1936 Norway awarded him the Order of Saint Olav for his consular service on its behalf. However, the honour was overshadowed by tragedy; on 14 March 1936 his mother died at her home at 6 Wentworth Road, Vaucluse, Australia.

Brewster-Joske subsequently changed his surname via deed poll to Brewster on 18 November 1938. In the process, he was noted as "a natural born British subject". As another war loomed in 1939, he took command of the local military, being granted the rank of lieutenant colonel. The next year, with World War II in full spate, he transferred to the Royal Australian Air Force as a group captain in Administration and Training.

Brewster died on 23 April 1947 in Delhi, India, while returning to Fiji from Britain. He fell 80 feet (24 m) from a window at his room in the Taj Mahal Hotel. A coroner returned a verdict of accidental death.
