= George Edwin Thomson =

Scottish World War I flying ace

- Born: 19 September 1897; Rangoon, Burma
- Died: 23 May 1918 (aged 20); Port Meadow, Oxford, England
- Burial place: Wolvercote Cemetery, Oxford, England
- Military career
- Allegiance: United Kingdom
- Branch: British Army; Royal Air Force
- Service years: ca 1916–1918
- Rank: Captain
- Units: King's Own Scottish Borderers; Royal Flying Corps: No. 46 Squadron; No. 7 Training Depot Station
- Awards: Distinguished Service Order; Military Cross; Distinguished Flying Cross

Captain George Edwin Thomson DSO MC (19 September 1897 – 23 May 1918) was a Scottish World War I flying ace credited with 21 aerial victories. He was the second ranking ace of his squadron, and one of the leading Sopwith Camel aces.

== Early life and service ==
George Edwin Thomson was the son of James and Ellen Thomson, who were native to Glenfuccan, Helensburgh, Dunbartonshire, Scotland. He was born in Rangoon (now Yangon), Burma (now Myanmar) on 19 September 1897.

Thomson went to the United Kingdom in order to join the King's Own Scottish Borderers. He transferred to the Royal Flying Corps in September 1916. His appointment as a Flying Officer with the rank of temporary second lieutenant was dated 30 December 1916.

== Flying service ==
Thomson was seriously injured during flight training; the accident left him with lasting scars to his face. Nevertheless, he joined 46 Squadron during the summer of 1917, to fly a Sopwith Pup. On 25 September 1917, he scored his first victory flying Pup no. B2196, destroying an enemy reconnaissance plane.

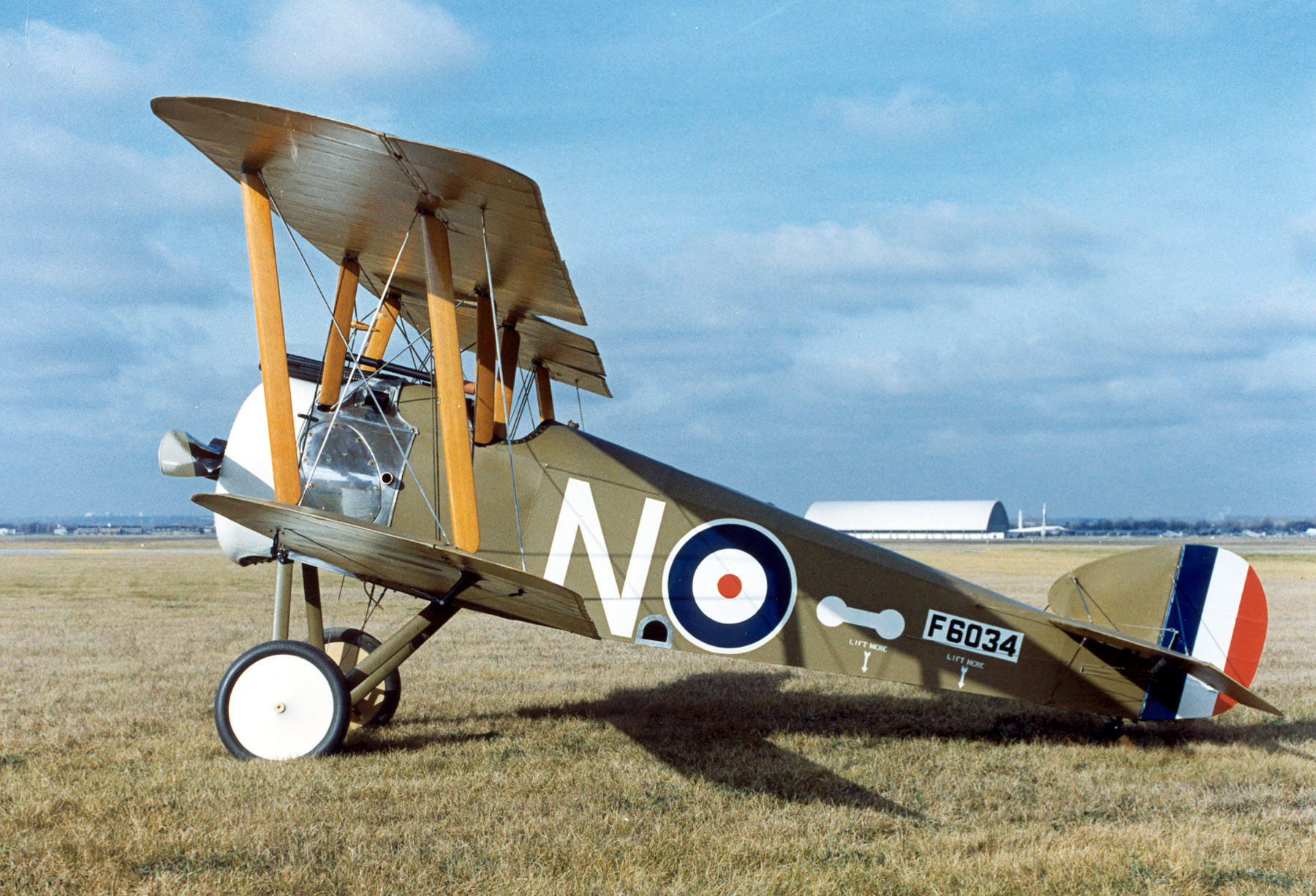
Thomson successfully used seven different Camels in his campaign of aerial victories.

Then 46 Squadron re-equipped with Sopwith Camels. On 30 November 1917, Thomson used Camel no. B3514 to destroy an Albatros D.V and capture a Pfalz D.III. On 10 December, he drove down another D.V out of control, using Camel no. B2451.

He would not score again until 18 January 1918, when he drove another two-seater down out of control, still using B2451. In February, he would use Camel B9131 to drive down an Albatros two-seater.

Then came March. He used four different Camels and reeled off fifteen victories within the month, including four on the 16th, three on the 23rd, and two on the 17th. The three on the 23rd brought his total to 21. His tally included five enemy planes destroyed; he shared one of these triumphs with fellow ace Sydney Smith. He also drove down fifteen enemy planes out of control; one of these victories was also shared with Smith, and another with Horace Debenham. The remaining win was the captured Pfalz.

Thomson was awarded the Military Cross on 22 April 1918. The Distinguished Service Order followed on 22 June. He also received the Distinguished Flying Cross, gazetted 21 September 1918.

== Death ==
He was then transferred to the Home Establishment in England as an instructor. On 23 May 1918, he took off from No. 7 Training Depot at Port Meadow, Oxford. His plane burst into flames and he died in the fiery crash. He was buried at Wolvercote Cemetery, Oxford.

== Honours and awards ==
Military Cross (MC)

T./Capt. George Edwin Thomson, Gen. List and R.F.C. For conspicuous gallantry and devotion to duty. On one occasion, when testing his machine, he observed a hostile two-seater machine between himself and the lines. He dived on it and fired sixty rounds at a close range, rendering the observer insensible. He then pulled up under the tail of the enemy machine, fired another thirty rounds, and observed it going down in a slow spin. He has accounted for six enemy machines, and has rendered continuous gallant and valuable service.

Distinguished Service Order (DSO)

Lt. (T./Capt.) George Edwin Thomson, M.C., Gen. List, and R.F.C. For conspicuous gallantry and devotion to duty. On one occasion, encountering a number of enemy two-seater planes, he dived on one of these and sent it down in flames. On returning to our lines, he dived on to another enemy machine, the observer of which was seen to collapse in his cockpit, the hostile machine going down completely out of control. On the following day, observing a hostile two-seater machine, he dived on it, engaging it at 100 yards range. On the hostile plane going down in a slow spin, he followed it to within 2,500 feet, but was compelled to withdraw owing to heavy machine-gun fire from the ground. He has, in all, accounted for twenty-one enemy machines, and has at all times during recent operations displayed the most marked skill and gallantry.

Captain Thomson also won the Distinguished Flying Cross, gazetted 21 September 1918.
