= Lionel Gaunce =

Canadian WWII flying ace (1915–1941)

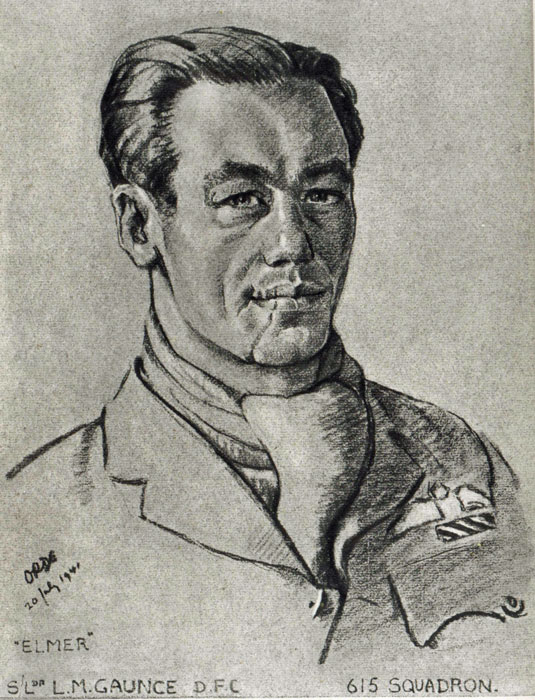
- Portrait of Gaunce, made by Cuthbert Orde in 1941
- Born: 20 September 1915; Lethbridge, Alberta, Canada
- Died: 19 November 1941 (aged 26) off the French Coast
- Military career
- Allegiance: Canada
- Branch: Royal Air Force
- Service years: 1936–1941 †
- Rank: Squadron Leader
- Commands: No. 41 Squadron; No. 46 Squadron
- Conflicts: Second World War: Battle of France; Battle of Britain; Circus offensive
- Awards: Distinguished Flying Cross

Lionel Gaunce, DFC (20 September 1915 – 19 November 1941) was a Canadian flying ace who served with the Royal Air Force (RAF) during the Second World War. He was credited with having shot down at least six aircraft.

Born in Lethbridge, Alberta, Gaunce joined the RAF in 1936 and after his training was completed was posted to No. 3 Squadron. At the time of the outbreak of the Second World War, he was recovering from injuries caused by his involvement in a road crash. In early 1940 he was sent to France to serve with No. 615 Squadron. He flew through the early stages of the Battle of France but achieved the first of his aerial victories during the Battle of Britain. From late October 1940 he led No. 46 Squadron until he took ill at the end of the year. Limited to ground duties for several months, he returned to operational flying in July 1941 as commander of No. 41 Squadron. He was killed when his Supermarine Spitfire fighter crashed into the sea off the French coast after being hit by anti-aircraft fire.

== Early life ==
Lionel Manley Gaunce was born on 20 September 1915 to Hope and Earl Gaunce in Lethbridge, a town in Alberta, Canada. Educated in Edmonton, he served in the Canadian Militia with the Loyal Edmonton Regiment for two years until January 1936, at which time he joined the Royal Air Force (RAF) on a short service commission. His initial flight training was at No. 9 Elementary and Reserve Flying Training School at Ansty before receiving his commission as an acting pilot officer at Uxbridge. He then went on to No. 5 Flying Training School at Sealand. Once he gained his wings and completed his training, he was posted to No. 3 Squadron in October.

At the time of his posting, No. 3 Squadron was based at Kenley and operated the Bristol Bulldog fighter but a few months later started to receive the more modern Gloster Gladiator fighter. Gaunce was confirmed in his pilot officer rank at the start of 1937, and eighteen months later was promoted to flying officer. He was made an acting flight lieutenant and became a flight commander in April 1939. Two months later he was involved in a road accident, crashing his motorcycle into a car. Hospitalised for just over a month as a result of his injuries, he spent several more weeks after his discharge recuperating.

== Second World War ==
Gaunce did not return to operational duties with No. 3 Squadron until after the outbreak of the Second World War. In the interim, he had returned to his previous rank of flying officer. By this time, the squadron was operating the Hawker Hurricane fighter from Croydon. In February 1940 he was posted to No. 615 Squadron which, at the time, was based in France as part of the Advanced Air Striking Force. His new unit, which was equipped with Gladiators, saw little action other than patrols until the commencement of the German invasion of France and the Low Countries on 10 May. Its aircraft upgraded to Hurricanes, it was heavily involved in bomber escort and interception duties. It was withdrawn to England on 23 May for a rest. On its return, Gaunce and five other pilots were briefly detached from the squadron to form a flight of Gladiators and sent to Manston. There it joined No. 604 Squadron, but this detachment was only for a week and Gaunce then returned to Kenley to rejoin his squadron.

=== Battle of Britain ===
No. 615 Squadron quickly became drawn into the aerial fighting over the English Channel and southern England and on 20 July, Gaunce destroyed a Messerschmitt Bf 109 fighter near Cap Gris-Nez. Five days later he shot down another Bf 109 near Dover. On 6 August, he was promoted to flight lieutenant. On 12 August, while on a sortie to the east of Beachy Head, he shot down one Bf 109 and claimed another as probably destroyed. He damaged a Messerschmitt Bf 110 heavy fighter south of Brighton on 16 August, and damaged what he claimed as a Heinkel He 113 fighter but what was actually a Bf 109 two days later near Kenley. He himself was shot down in the engagement, baling out of his Hurricane and receiving minor burns. In recognition of his aerial successes in the aerial campaign over the south of England, he was awarded the Distinguished Flying Cross. This was gazetted on 23 August and the published citation read:

This flight commander has displayed excellent coolness and leadership since the return of the squadron to England. In July, 1940, his flight took part in resisting an enemy air attack on Dover, when three of our aircraft were attacked by forty Junkers 87's. At least two of the enemy aircraft were shot down. Flight Lieutenant Gaunce has shot down three enemy aircraft since returning to England.

— London Gazette, No. 34929, 23 August 1940

Briefly hospitalised before returning to No. 615 Squadron, on 26 August Gaunce destroyed a Bf 109 over the Thames Estuary. The same day he was shot down, baling out and coming down into the sea. Burnt and suffering shock, he was treated at Herne Bay hospital. He did not return to his unit until 15 September. By this time the squadron was resting at Prestwick in Scotland after its extensive operations over southeast England.

In late October Gaunce was promoted to acting squadron leader and appointed commander of No. 46 Squadron. This Hurricane-equipped unit was based at Stapleford Tawney but the Luftwaffe's offensive against England was declining in intensity by this time and it was only infrequently in action. On 11 November, the squadron was scrambled to intercept a raid mounted by the Corpo Aereo Italiano (Italian Air Corps). Gaunce shot down one Fiat CR.42 fighter and probably destroyed a second, both to the east of Orford Ness. He also, with another pilot, shared in the destruction of a Fiat BR.20 medium bomber near Harwich. The following month he took ill and relinquished command of No. 46 Squadron.

=== Later war service ===
Gaunce was kept in a non-flying role for several months until, in July 1941, he was given command of No. 41 Squadron. His new unit was equipped with Supermarine Spitfire fighters and was engaged in Fighter Command's Circus offensive, carrying out sorties to German-occupied France as part of the Tangmere wing. On 20 August he damaged a Bf 109 near Le Havre, and the following day shared in the probable destruction of another near Dunkirk. He damaged a Bf 109 over Saint-Omer on 27 August, and the following day, near Le Havre, damaged a second. On 1 September, his squadron leader rank was made substantive. He damaged a Bf 109 to the south of Boulogne, his final aerial victory. Flying a sortie to France on 19 November, his Spitfire was hit by anti-aircraft fire as he passed near Ivigny. He was seen to crash into the sea off Janville and presumed to have been killed.

Gaunce was survived by his wife of four years, Queenie Paula Scott, and is commemorated on the Runneymeade Memorial at Englefield Green. After the war, a mountain in Alberta's Jasper National Park was named for him. He is credited with the shooting down of six aircraft, one of which was shared with another pilot. He is also credited with three aircraft probably destroyed, one being shared, and six damaged.
