= Harry Robinson (RAF officer) =

Harry Noel Cornforth Robinson
- Born: 25 December 1898; West Hartlepool, Durham, England
- Died: 2 June 1926 (aged 27)
- Military career
- Allegiance: United Kingdom
- Branch: British Army; Royal Air Force
- Service years: 1917–1926
- Rank: Flight lieutenant
- Units: No. 46 Squadron RFC; No. 70 Squadron RAF
- Conflicts: World War I • Western Front; Iraqi revolt
- Awards: Military Cross; Distinguished Flying Cross; Croix de guerre (France)

Flight Lieutenant Harry Noel Cornforth Robinson (25 December 1898 – 2 June 1926) was a British World War I flying ace credited with 10 aerial victories. After winning the Military Cross and Croix de guerre, he remained in service post-war, winning the Distinguished Flying Cross in Iraq.

== World War I ==
Robinson was commissioned as a temporary second lieutenant (on probation) on the General List of the Royal Flying Corps on 10 May 1917, and was confirmed in his rank and appointed a flying officer on 12 July 1917.

He was posted to No. 46 Squadron, initially flying the Sopwith Pup, until the squadron was re-equipped with the Sopwith Camel in November 1917. It would be 28 December 1917 before he scored his first aerial victory, being responsible for capturing a German reconnaissance aircraft. His second victory came on 11 March 1918, when he drove down out of control an Albatros D.V. Then, between 21 and 24 March, he scored six more victories.

On 28 March 1918 Robinson was appointed a flight commander, with the rank of acting captain, and was reassigned to No. 70 Squadron, where he gained two more victories in April and May. He was also awarded the Military Cross which was gazetted on 3 May 1918. His citation read:

Temporary Second Lieutenant Harry Noel Cornforth Robinson, General List and RFC.

"For conspicuous gallantry and devotion to duty. While on an offensive patrol he had trouble with his petrol pressure and was forced to turn back towards our lines. On his way back he saw seven enemy scouts attacking two of our artillery machines. He immediately dived on to the enemy and drove one of them down. During this operation one of his guns jammed. The enemy still continued the attack and he again dived on them, but his remaining gun also jammed. Though both his guns were out of action and he had very little petrol left, he continued to dive on the enemy repeatedly and eventually drove them away. He showed splendid courage and resource."

== Post-war career ==
Robinson remained in the RAF after the end of the war, relinquishing his acting rank of captain on 27 March 1919. He was granted a short service commission with the rank of flying officer on 24 October 1919, and later saw active service in Iraq, where he was awarded the Distinguished Flying Cross, gazetted on 28 October 1921. His citation read:

Flying Officer Harry Noel Cornforth Robinson, MC, RAF.

"For gallantry and devotion to duty. A gallant and daring pilot, especially while operating round Samawah and Nasiriyeh. His keenness at all times has been much marked."

On 24 October 1923 Robinson was granted a permanent commission with the rank of flying officer, and was promoted to flight lieutenant on 1 January 1925.

Robinson died on 2 June 1926, with the Hartlepool Mail reporting that he had been "ill for seven months".

== List of aerial victories ==
Combat record
No.	Date/Time	Aircraft/ Serial No.	Opponent	Result	Location
No. 46 Squadron RFC
1	28 December 1917 @ 1200 hours	Sopwith Camel s/n B2429	German reconnaissance aircraft	Captured	West of Havrincourt, France
2	11 March 1918 @ 1645 hours	Sopwith Camel s/n B5425	Albatros D.V fighter	Driven down out of control	Dury, France
3	21 March 1918 @ 1200 hours	Sopwith Camel s/n B9158	Albatros D.V	Driven down out of control	Map grid 57C E20
4	22 March 1918 @ 1730–1800 hours	Sopwith Camel s/n B9158	Albatros reconnaissance aircraft	Destroyed	Hendecourt, France
5	22 March 1918 @ 1730–1800 hours	Sopwith Camel s/n B9158	LVG reconnaissance aircraft	Driven down out of control	Bullecourt, France
6	23 March 1918 @ 1000–1005 hours	Sopwith Camel s/n B5425	LVG reconnaissance aircraft	Destroyed	Vaulx, France
7	23 March 1918 @ 1000–1005 hours	Sopwith Camel s/n B5425	LVG reconnaissance aircraft	Driven down out of control	Vaulx, France
8	24 March 1918 @ 1600 hours	Sopwith Camel s/n B5425	Albatros reconnaissance aircraft	Destroyed	Sailly-Saillisel, France
No. 70 Squadron RAF
9	6 April 1918 @ 1545 hours	Sopwith Camel s/n C8217	Albatros reconnaissance aircraft	Driven down out of control	Bray, France
10	15 May 1918 @ 0700 hours	Sopwith Camel s/n C8217	Pfalz D.III fighter	Driven down out of control	Map grid 57D R4

== See also ==
- Aerial victory standards of World War I
- List of World War I aces credited with 10 victories
- Winged Victory
