= Arthur Lee (RAF officer) =

Air Vice Marshal, Royal Air Force

Arthur Stanley Gould Lee
- Born: 31 August 1894; Boston, Lincolnshire, England
- Died: 21 May 1975 (aged 80); London, England
- Military career
- Allegiance: United Kingdom
- Branch: British Army (1915–18); Royal Air Force (1918–46)
- Service years: 1915–1946
- Rank: Air Vice Marshal
- Units: Nottinghamshire and Derbyshire Regiment; No. 46 Squadron RFC
- Commands: RAF Hornchurch (1935–37); No. 10 Squadron RAF (1929–31)
- Awards: Military Cross; Mentioned in Despatches; Commander of the Royal Order of George I (Greece)

Air Vice Marshal Arthur Stanley Gould Lee, MC (31 August 1894 – 21 May 1975) was a senior officer of the Royal Air Force (RAF). He began his flying career in the Royal Flying Corps during the First World War, scoring seven confirmed victories to become a flying ace and rising to the rank of captain. He continued his service in the RAF, serving throughout the Second World War before retiring in 1946 to devote himself to writing, including several volumes of autobiography.

== Military career ==
=== First World War ===
Lee was commissioned as a temporary second lieutenant on 23 February 1915, to serve in the Nottinghamshire and Derbyshire Regiment. He later transferred to the Royal Flying Corps; he wrote in his book No Parachute on 19 May 1917, six pilots, newly arrived in France and still to be allocated to a squadron, were each given a new B.E.2e to ferry between RFC depots at St Omer and Candas. One crashed in transit, three crashed on landing and one went missing (the pilot was killed). Lee, the pilot of the only aircraft to arrive safely, wrote in a letter to his wife:

I felt rather a cad not crashing too because everyone is glad to see death-traps like Quirks written off, especially new ones.

He was promoted to lieutenant on 1 July 1917. Posted to No. 46 Squadron RFC to fly the Sopwith Pup, Lee gained his first aerial victory on 4 September 1917 by driving down out of control an Albatros D.V north-east of Polygon Wood. A week later, on 11 September 1917 he shared in the driving down of a Type C reconnaissance aircraft with Captain Maurice Scott and Lieutenants Eric Yorath Hughes and E. Armitage, south of the Scarpe River. Lee, Scott and Hughes repeated this feat ten days later and, the following day, 22 September, Lee drove down another D.V over Sailly-en-Ostrevent. Lee's fifth victory, on 30 September, which made him an ace, was gained over Vitry, driving down a DFW reconnaissance aircraft. He was appointed a flight commander with the temporary rank of captain on 20 November, and completed his victory string ten days later on 30 November, driving down another DFW over Havrincourt-Flesquières in the morning and destroying an Albatros D.V west of Bourlon in the afternoon.

Lee was awarded the Military Cross on 4 February 1918, which was gazetted in July:

Temporary Second Lieutenant (Temporary Captain) Arthur Stanley Lee, Nottinghamshire and Derbyshire Regiment and Royal Flying Corps. For conspicuous gallantry and devotion to duty. He bombed an enemy battery and fired on their gunners with his machine gun, and then attacked and drove off three enemy machines. While flying in very low clouds he lost his way, and could not steady his compass, and after flying for some distance, in what he believed to be the direction of our lines, he landed in open country, and was at once attacked and fired on by enemy cavalry. He had kept his engine running and succeeded in getting off, and, having fired on the enemy, found his position and returned to our lines. On another occasion he made a flight in a very thick mist, drove down an enemy machine, bombed an enemy position, and assisted the infantry to repel an enemy attack. He showed splendid courage and initiative.

=== Inter-war career ===
Lee remained in the Royal Air Force (RAF) post-war, being granted a short service commission as a flight lieutenant on 24 October 1919, which was made permanent on 19 March 1924. He was posted to serve on the staff of the Headquarters of No. 1 Group, based at RAF Kidbrooke, on 15 July 1924. On 4 October 1925 Lee was transferred to serve at the Air Ministry, but only stayed there for a month as he was posted to the RAF Depot on 4 November, before being sent to Iraq to serve in No. 5 Armoured Car Company from 18 November, then as a staff officer at the Headquarters of RAF Iraq Command from 16 February 1926.

On 1 July 1927 Lee was promoted to squadron leader, returning to the United Kingdom to attend a course at the RAF Staff College, Andover from 16 August. On 17 December 1928 he was posted to No. 10 (Bomber) Squadron based at RAF Upper Heyford, initially as a flight commander, before taking command of the squadron. From 4 February 1931 Lee served on the staff of the Headquarters of the Coastal Area, and on 4 January 1932 was posted to the Air Staff in the Directorate of Organisation and Staff Duties, later serving in the Directorate of Operations until 24 September 1934, and receiving promotion to wing commander on 1 July 1934. In 1935 Lee attended a course at the Imperial Defence College, which he completed in early December, and on 22 December was appointed station commander of RAF Hornchurch.

On 15 October 1937 Lee was transferred to the Special Duty List when seconded for duty with the Turkish Government to serve as an instructor at the newly formed Turkish Air Force Staff College. He was promoted to group captain on 1 November 1938.

=== Second World War ===
Lee was released from his post in Turkey in March 1941, and soon after arriving in Egypt was appointed Senior Officer Administration to Air Vice Marshal John D'Albiac, commander of the British Air Forces in Greece, supporting the Greeks following the Italian invasion. Despite early successes the intervention of the Germans soon put the Allied forces on the defensive, and the British were eventually driven out, first to Crete, then to Egypt. For the rest of 1941 Lee served as a staff officer (operations) in the Headquarters of RAF Middle East Command, then as Deputy Senior Air Staff Officer in the Desert Air Force.

Lee eventually returned to Britain to be appointed Senior Air Staff Officer of No. 12 Group in RAF Fighter Command, and was appointed a temporary air commodore on 1 November 1942. On 29 December 1942 he was granted permission to wear the insignia of a Commander of the Royal Order of George I with swords, conferred by George II, King of the Hellenes. On 8 June 1944 he received a mention in despatches.

In September 1944, following the coup in Romania that brought the country over from the Axis to the Allies, Lee was appointed Head of the Air Section for the British Element of the Control Commission in Romania. On 19 February 1945 he was appointed chief of the British Military Mission to the Yugoslav Government of Marshal Josip Broz Tito, with the acting rank of air vice marshal, finally relinquishing his acting rank on 13 July 1945.

== Post-war career ==
Lee retired from the RAF on 21 January 1946, and was permitted to retain the rank of air vice marshal.

Following his retirement Lee pursued a career as a writer, something that had begun as early as 1917 when he wrote detailed daily letters to his wife, which later became the basis for his book No Parachute: A Fighter Pilot in World War I, published in 1968. While a serving officer Lee has been awarded prizes for essay-writing in 1924 and 1925, served as the first editor of The Hawk, the Royal Air Force Staff College's annual magazine, from 1929, and compiled a history of RAF Hornchurch in 1936. He wrote several works of autobiography, biographies, histories and a novel.

== Publications ==
Autobiography

- Special Duties: Reminiscences of a Royal Air Force staff officer in the Balkans, Turkey and the Middle East. London: S. Low, Marston & Co., Ltd. 1946. ISBN 978-0091201401.
- Open Cockpit: A Pilot of the Royal Flying Corps. London: Jarrolds. 1969. ISBN 978-0091201401.
- No Parachute: A Fighter Pilot in World War I. Harper & Row. 1970. ISBN 978-0060125486.
- Fly Past: Highlights From a Flyer's Life. London: Jarrolds. 1974. ISBN 978-0091201401.

Historical/biographical

- The Royal House of Greece. London: Ward Lock. 1948.
- Crown Against Sickle: The Story of King Michael of Rumania. London: Hutchinson. 1949.
- The Empress Frederick writes to Sophie, her daughter, Crown Princess and later Queen of the Hellenes: Letters, 1889-1901. London: Faber & Faber. 1955. (editor)
- Helen, Queen Mother of Rumania, Princess of Greece and Denmark: An Authorized Biography. London: Faber & Faber. 1956.
- The Son of Leicester: The Story of Sir Robert Dudley, titular Earl of Warwick, Earl of Leicester, and Duke of Northumberland. London: Gollancz. 1964.
- The Flying Cathedral: The Story of Samuel Franklin Cody. London: Metheun. 1965.
- The Story of Aigua Blava and Xiquet: Sketches of a Catalan Paradise. London: Marshall-Lea Books. 1973. ISBN 978-0903757003.

Fiction

- An Airplane in the Arabian Nights. London: T. Werner Laurie. 1947.
