= Maurice Freehill =

British World War I flying ace

Maurice Michael Freehill
- Born: 21 January 1899; Battersea, London, England
- Died: 3 February 1939 (aged 40); York Military Hospital, Yorkshire, England
- Military career
- Allegiance: United Kingdom
- Branch: British Army; Royal Air Force
- Service years: 1917–1939
- Rank: Squadron Leader
- Units: Hampshire Regiment; No. 46 Squadron RFC/RAF; No. 80 Squadron RAF; No. 25 Squadron RAF; No. 5 Armoured Car Coy. RAF; No. 1 Squadron RAF; No. 55 Squadron RAF; No. 41 Squadron RAF; No. 58 Squadron RAF
- Conflicts: World War I
- Awards: Distinguished Flying Cross

Squadron Leader Maurice Michael Freehill DFC (21 January 1899 – 3 February 1939) was a British World War I flying ace credited with seven aerial victories, who went on to serve in the Royal Air Force until his death in 1939.

== Biography ==
=== World War I ===
Freehill was born in Battersea, London, the son of Eugene and Lilian Freehill. On 20 January 1917, the day before his 18th birthday, he enlisted into the Hampshire Regiment as a private. He soon transferred to the Royal Flying Corps as a cadet, being appointed a probationary temporary second lieutenant on 21 June, and was appointed a flying officer and confirmed in his rank on 13 September.

Posted to No. 46 Squadron RFC, flying the Sopwith Camel, he scored his first victory on 23 March 1918, destroying an enemy aircraft over Bullecourt. On 1 April the Royal Flying Corps merged with the Royal Naval Air Service to form the Royal Air Force, and Freehill's unit became No. 46 Squadron RAF. His next two victories, on 3 and 20 April, were over Albatros C reconnaissance aircraft, both shared with Captain Cecil Marchant. On 30 May he drove down a Fokker Dr.I over Estaires, and then accounted for three Fokker D.VIIs; one each on 7 and 15 August, before transferring to No. 80 Squadron for his seventh and final victory on 3 October, having been appointed temporary captain on 30 September.

Freehill was subsequently awarded the Distinguished Flying Cross, which was gazetted on 7 February 1919. His citation read:

Lieutenant (Acting Captain) Maurice Michael Freehill.
A brilliant leader who has destroyed five enemy aircraft and has displayed conspicuous bravery in attacking enemy troops on the ground. On 4th November, observing that a machine-gun post was holding up the advance of our infantry, he attacked it from a very low altitude, inflicting heavy casualties on the crews and putting them to flight. Later on he carried out a reconnaissance of the Army front at a height of 50 feet in the face of intense machine-gun fire, bringing back most valuable information.

=== Post-war career ===
Freehill remained in the Royal Air Force post-war, being granted a permanent commission on 1 August 1919 with the rank of lieutenant, retaining his acting rank of captain for a time.

On 23 August 1923 Freehill was sent to the Electrical and Wireless School at RAF Flowerdown for a course of instruction, before being posted to No. 25 Squadron at RAF Hawkinge on 5 December 1923.

On 1 July 1925 Freehill was promoted from flying officer to flight lieutenant, and on 22 September 1925 was posted to No. 5 Armoured Car Company, part of RAF forces in Iraq. He remained in Iraq to serve in No. 1 Squadron from 25 June 1926, and No. 55 Squadron from 1 November 1926, before returning to the UK, being posted to the Depot at RAF Uxbridge on 16 October 1927. He then served as an instructor at the Central Flying School at RAF Wittering from 17 January 1928, and at No. 2 Flying Training School at RAF Digby from 5 April 1928.

Freehill returned to Iraq to rejoin No. 55 Squadron on 18 January 1930, before serving with No. 41 (F) Squadron at RAF Northolt from 27 April 1932. He was posted to the School of Photography at RAF South Farnborough on 24 October 1936, and was promoted to squadron leader on 1 April 1937. He was then posted to No. 58 (Bomber) Squadron at RAF Boscombe Down for flying duties on 22 April 1937.

Squadron Leader Freehill died at York Military Hospital on 3 February 1939.
