= Victor Maslin Yeates =

British World War I flying ace

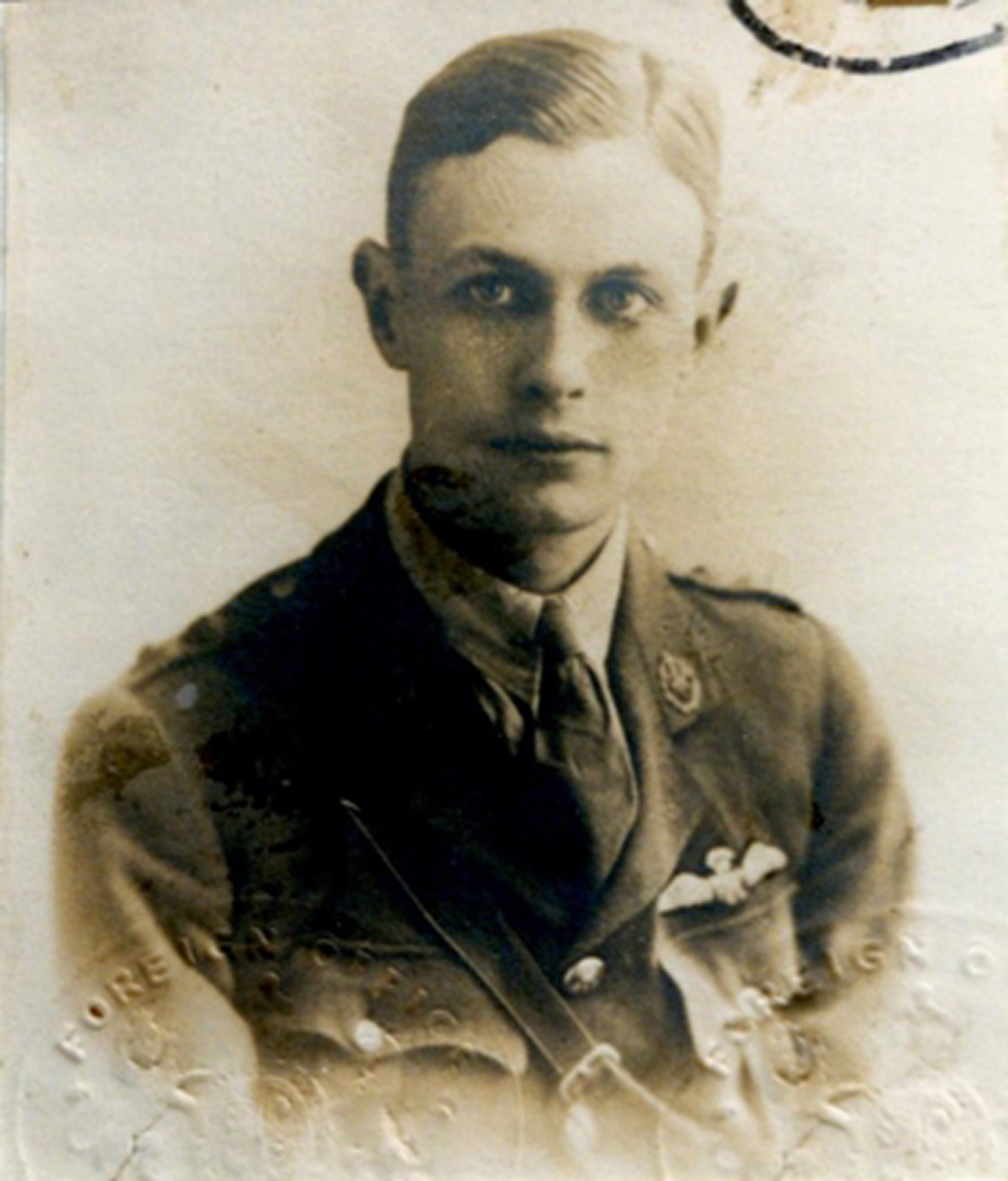
Victor Maslin Yeates, passport photo in RFC uniform, 1918

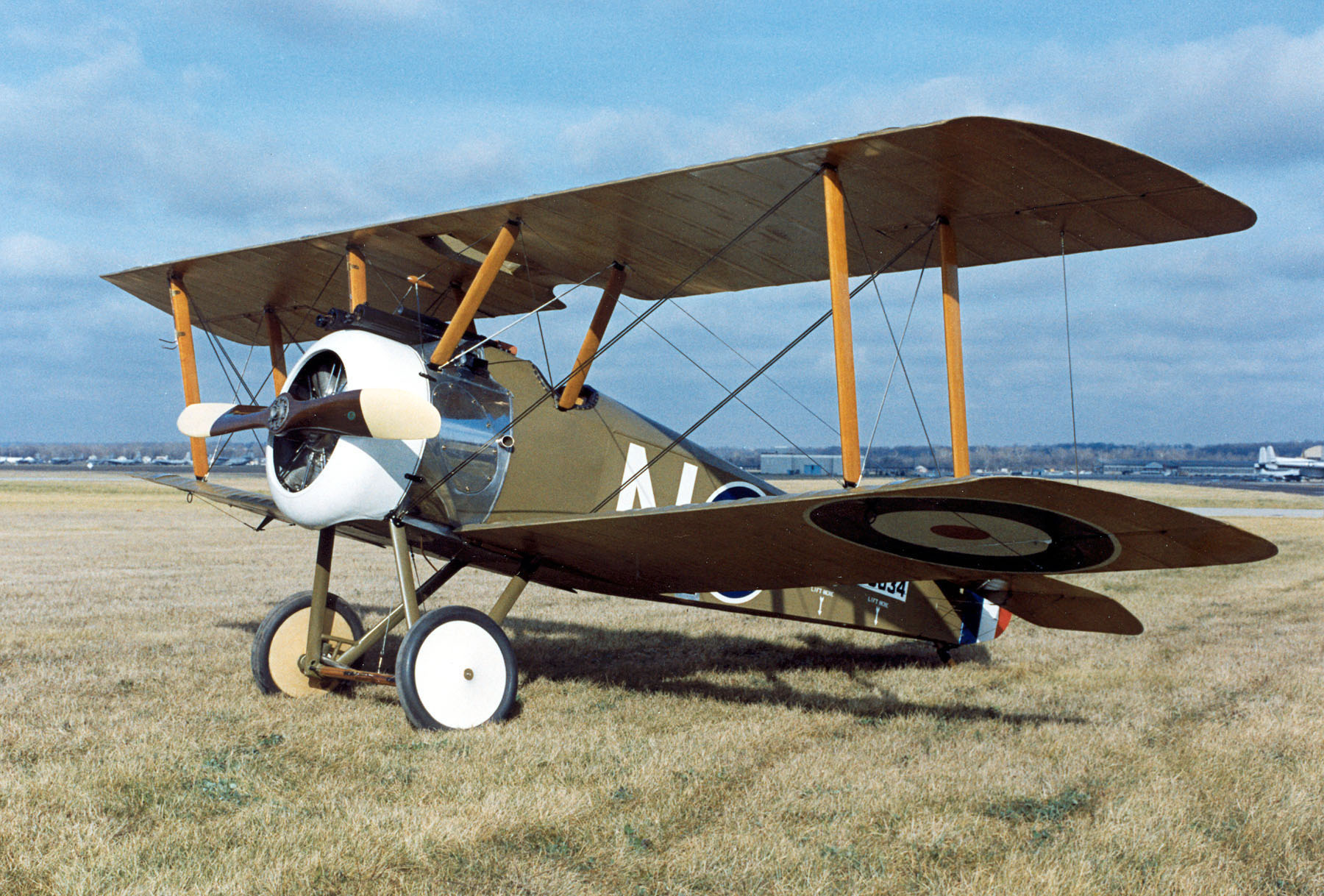
Sopwith Camel.Type of First World War aircraft flown by V. M. Yeates

Victor Maslin Yeates (30 September 1897 — 15 December 1934), often abbreviated to V. M. Yeates, was a British fighter pilot in World War I. He wrote Winged Victory, a semi-autobiographical work widely regarded as one of the most realistic accounts of aerial combat and the futility of war.

== Early life ==
Yeates was born at Dulwich, and educated at Colfe's School, where according to Henry Williamson he read Keats under the desk during Maths, explored woods, fields and ponds and kept a tame tawny owl.

== World War 1 ==
He enlisted the Inns of Court Officers' Training Corps in 1916, and transferred to the Royal Flying Corps (later the Royal Air Force) in May 1917. He married in July 1917, at the age of 19 and while in training, to the disapproval of his parents. Initially serving with No. 46 Squadron, to which he was posted in February 1918, by then he had logged twelve hours of dual flying instruction and fifty-three hours solo, of which the last thirteen hours were in a Sopwith Camel.

The German Spring Offensive began just over a month later, and he flew intensively, many operational flights consisting of highly dangerous ground strafing and bombing. Yeates was posted to 80 Sqn on 9 August from 46 Sqn and joined B Flight, and left the Squadron on 31 August after the move to a new airfield at Allonville. He was invalided back to England suffering from Flying Sickness D (for Debility), brought about by the strain and conditions of constant flying. He was given one month's sick leave, further extended to 7 November 1918, when he was transferred to TDS Fairlop as an assistant flying instructor, being demobilized from the R.A.F. on 23 May 1919.

During the conflict he had flown 110 sorties, 248 hours in Sopwith Camels, force landed four times, was shot down by ground fire and scored five victories (two enemy aircraft destroyed, a share in three others and with Capt. D. R. MacLaren brought down a balloon in flames), thereby achieving "ace" status.

== Winged Victory ==
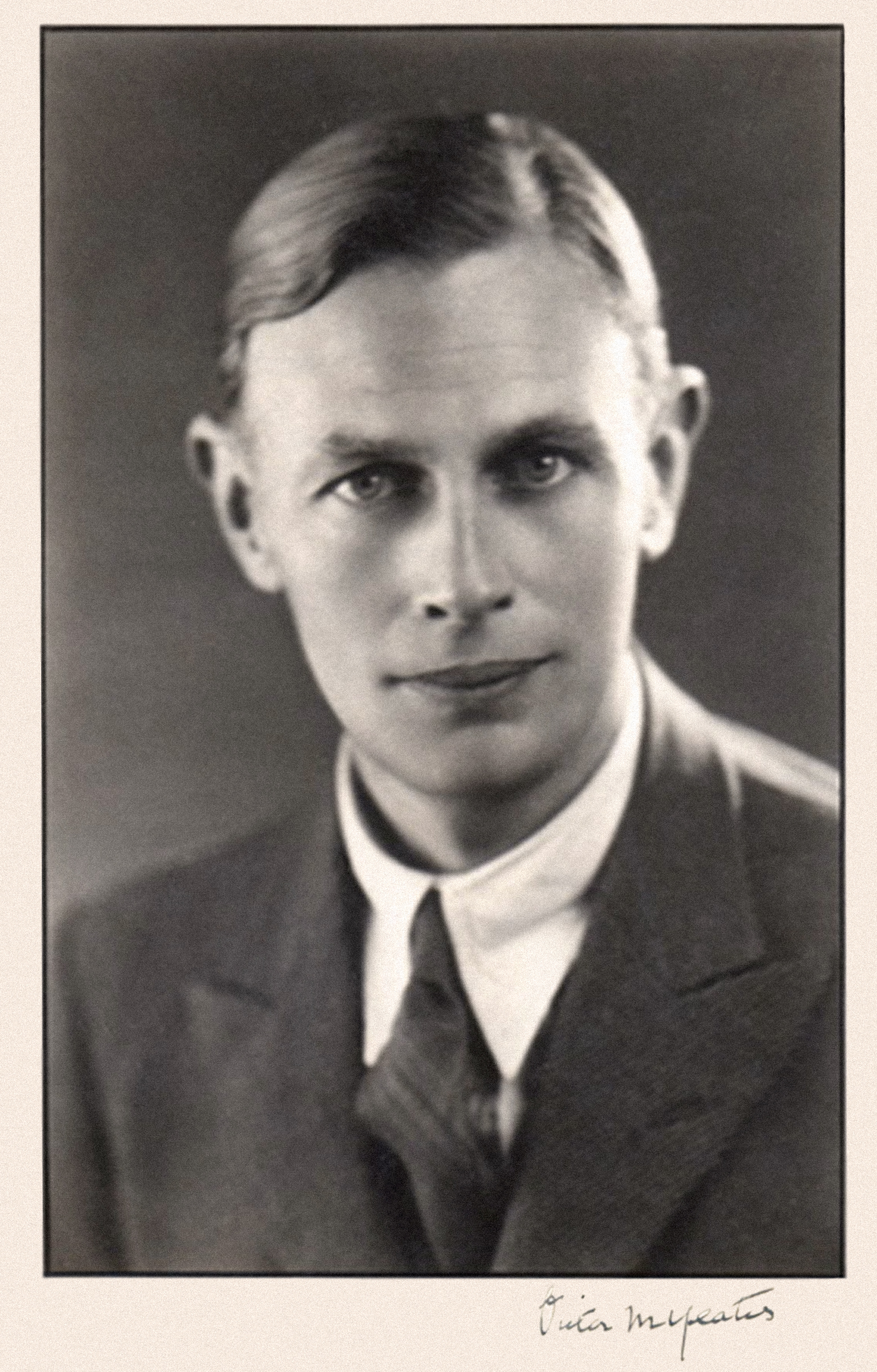
Victor Maslin Yeates, 1934

Yeates is now best known for his semi-autobiographical book Winged Victory, which remains well regarded as an authentic depiction of World War I aerial combat. Yeates's school friend Henry Williamson helped him edit the manuscript, assisted in finding a publisher, and eventually contributed a foreword to a republished edition of Winged Victory. There he supported a review in the New York Saturday Review of Literature, that it was "one of the great books of our time."

Yeates wrote in the flyleaf of Williamson's copy of Winged Victory that: "I started [writing the book] in April 1933 in Colindale Hospital. I could not write there, so walked out one morning, the doctor threatening death. I wrote daily till the end of the year. My chief difficulty was to compromise between truth and art, for I was writing a novel that was to be an exact reproduction of the period and an exact analysis and synthesis of a state of mind."

=== Descriptions of aerial combat ===
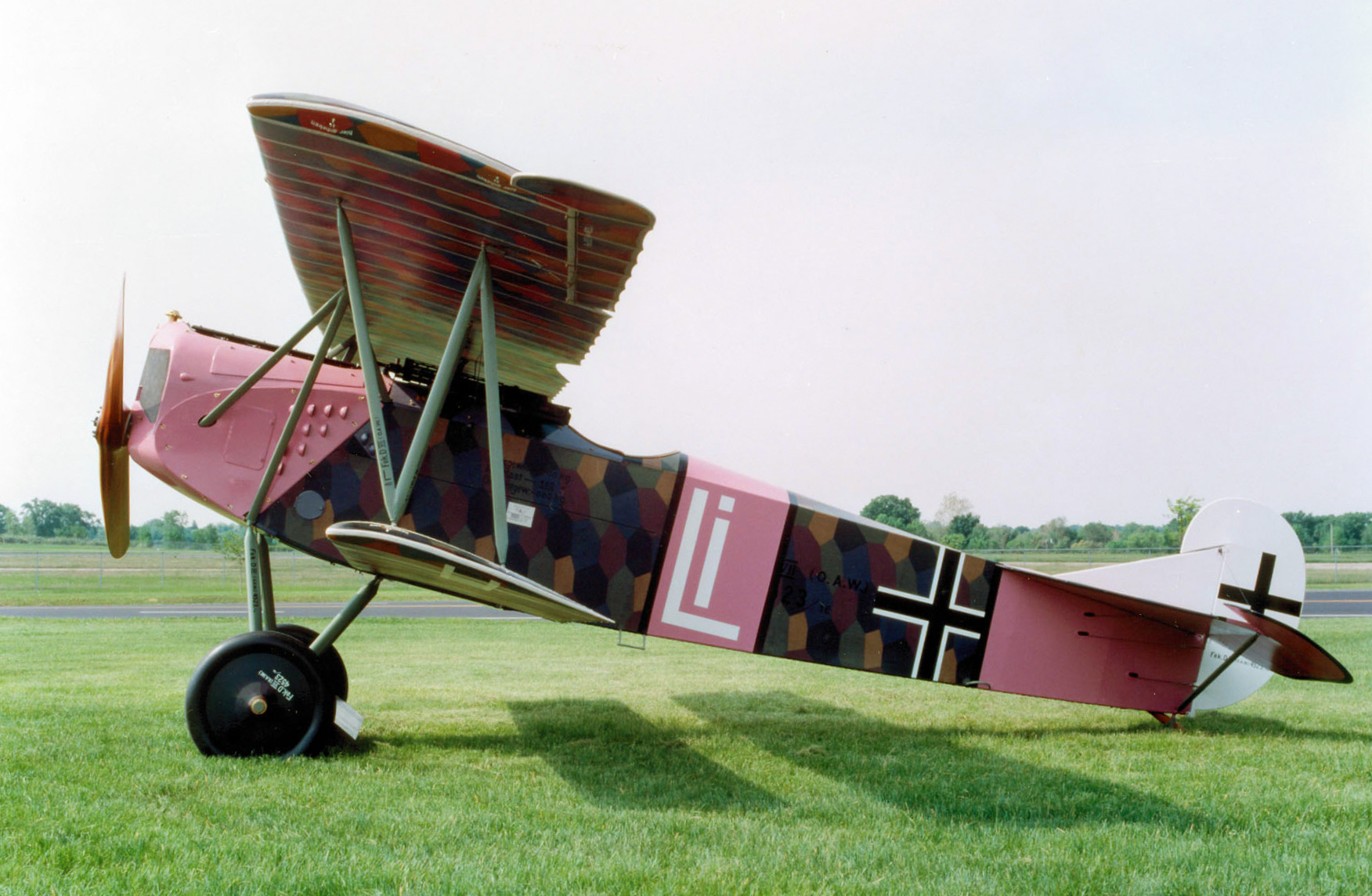
Fokker DVII.Type of First World War aircraft attacked by VM Yeates.

Winged Victory is remarkable for its depictions of World War I aerial combat, such as the following excerpt:

They flew over the ghastly remains of Villers-Bretonneux which were still being tortured by bursting shells upspurting in columns of smoke and debris that stood solid for a second and then floated fading away in the wind. All along the line from Hamel to Hangard Wood the whiter puff-balls of shrapnel were appearing and fading multitudinously and incessantly...A flaming meteor fell out of a cloud close by them and plunged earthwards. It was an aeroplane going down in flames from some fight above the clouds. Where it fell the atmosphere was stained by a thanatognomonic black streak...Tom sitting there in the noise and the hard wind had the citied massy earth his servant tumbler, waiting upon his touch of stick or rudder for its guidance; instantly responding, ready to leap and frisk a lamb-planet amid the steady sun-bound sheep...Some of the cloud peaks thrust up to ten thousand feet; in the blue fields beyond there was an occasional flash of a tilting wing reflecting the sun. Mac climbed as fast as he could. In a few minutes they were at ten thousand, and the Huns, a mile above them, were discernable as aeroplanes, bluely translucent...Rattle of guns and flash of tracers and the Fokker in a vertical turn, red, with extension on the top planes (Fokker DVII). Tom hated those extensions. He was doing a very splitarse turn for a Hun, but tracers seemed to be finding him. Got him, oh got him: over, flopping over, nose dropping, spinning.

The novel's discursiveness and realism make it one of the most intriguing descriptions of life on the Western Front: the interactions with French residents, the diet of the officer's mess, travel on home leave and recuperation at Army Medical facilities; what officers talked about, the tunes on the gramophone, the food on offer, the narrator's heroic drinking. Yeates is also interested in the management styles of the series of squadron commanders who pass through and their efforts to make the narrator a more aggressive fighter pilot. The narrator is tormented by his inability to match the out-and-out warriors and aces who constitute the ideal. He is deeply honest about the growing stress and debilitation as his friends die one by one and he longs for his tour of duty to reach its end.

=== Philosophy about war ===
In Winged Victory Yeates regularly expressed disillusion with the war, with his senior officers and with the causes of war, more typical of the 1930s than of the time he describes:

"For there's one thing financiers cannot or will not see. They have visions of a frontierless world in which their operations will proceed without hindrance and make all human activities dependent on them; but their world state is impossible because finance is sterile, and a state living by finance must always have neighbours from which to suck blood, or it is like a dog eating its own tail...an intense war-fever inoculation was carried out by the press. It took rather less than three months, I believe, to make the popular demand for war irresistible...There'll be a famous orgy of money snatching over our bones."

The novel is occasionally over-written or unduly discursive but contains a realistic portrait of RFC and then RAF life and operations on the Western Front, starting with the launch of Operation Michael, the gigantic German Spring Offensive on 21 March 1918. The narrator and his squadron are ground down by ground attack operations against the German army, as the Allied Armies fight for their lives, while faster scouts (fighters) such as the S.E.5 and the Bristol Fighter dogfight with German fighters. The Camel role is unglamorous and very dangerous, machine gunning trenches and approach routes at 100 miles per hour (160 km/h) a few hundred feet up in un-armoured aircraft, with a constant threat from machine-gun fire from the soldiers beneath them.

== Death ==
Yeates died at the age of thirty seven at Fairlight Sanatorium, Hastings, East Sussex, from tuberculosis in December 1934. His grave is in Hastings Cemetery. He was survived by his wife Norah Phelps Yeates (née Richards) and his four children Mary, Joy Elinor, Guy Maslin and Rosalind; all of whom had lived with Yeates in a small house in Kent on the Sidcup by-pass of the Dover Road.
