= No. 46 Squadron RAF =

Defunct flying squadron of the Royal Air Force

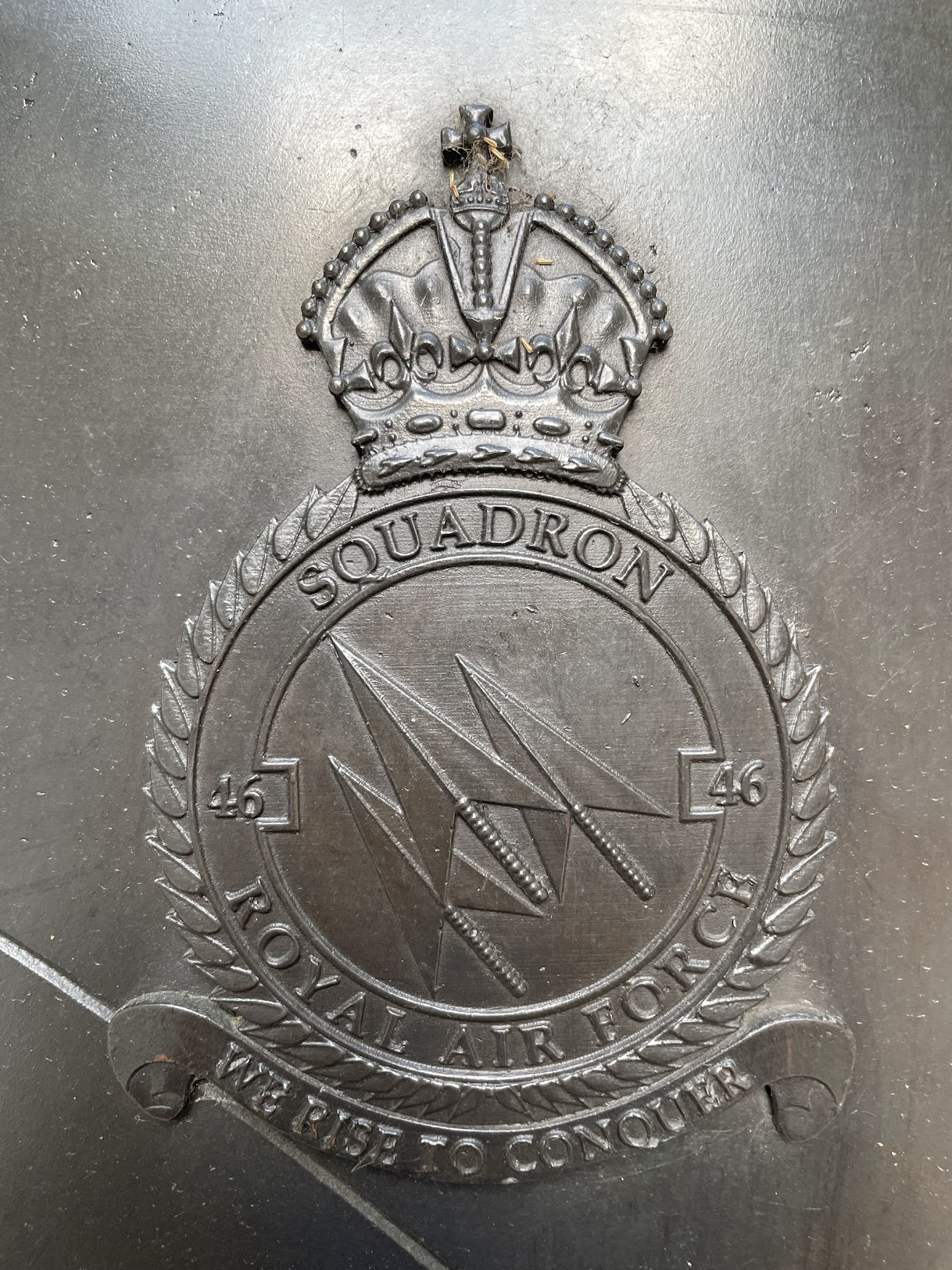
- Heraldic badge of the squadron displayed on the Battle of Britain Monument in London
- Active: 19 April 1916 – 31 December 1919; 1936 – 20 February 1950; 15 August 1954 – 30 June 1961; 1 December 1966 – 31 August 1975
- Country: United Kingdom
- Branch: Royal Air Force
- Motto: "We rise to conquer"
- Battle honours: Western Front, 1916–18: Messines, 1917*: Cambrai, 1917*: Home Defence, 1917: Somme, 1918*: Hindenburg Line: Norway, 1940*: Battle of Britain, 1940*: Home Defence, 1940–41: Fortress Europe, 1941: Malta, 1941–42*: El Alamein*: Egypt & Libya, 1942–43: Mediterranean 1942–43: South-East Europe, 1944*: Honours marked with an asterisk are those emblazoned on the Squadron Standard

Insignia
- Squadron badge heraldry: Two arrowheads, surmounted by a third, all in bend. The arrows in the badge signify speed in getting into action and their position and number represent three aircraft climbing.
- Squadron codes: RJ Apr 1939 – Sep 1939; PO Sep 1939 – Jun 1941; XK Jan 1945 – Feb 1950
- Post-1950 squadron roundel

No. 46 Squadron of the Royal Flying Corps and the Royal Air Force, formed in 1916, was disbanded and re-formed three times before its last disbandment in 1975. It served in both World War I and World War II.

== World War I ==
No. 46 Squadron was formed at Wyton aerodrome on 19 April 1916, from a nucleus trained in No. 2 Reserve Squadron; it moved to France in October of that year equipped with Nieuport two-seater aircraft.

The squadron undertook artillery co-operation, photography, and reconnaissance operations until May 1917, when it took on a more offensive role after rearming with the Sopwith Pup. It was based at the aerodrome at La Gorgue from 12 May to 6 July 1917.

The change from a corps to a fighter squadron came at a moment when Allied air superiority was being seriously challenged by Germany, in particular through the introduction of the "circuses" formed and led by Manfred von Richthofen. Operating under the 11th Army Wing, the squadron was intensively engaged and had many combats with the enemy. In July 1917, No. 46 Squadron returned to Sutton's Farm (later Hornchurch) in Essex, for the defence of London, which had been heavily raided by Gotha bombers a short time before; no enemy aircraft penetrated its patrol area. The squadron returned to France at the end of August.

In addition to offensive patrol work, the unit undertook extensive ground strafing and did close support work in the attack on Messines Ridges.

In November 1917, the squadron was equipped with Sopwith Camels, and gave valuable assistance to the infantry in the Battle of Cambrai attack.

During the last year of the war, the squadron bombed lines of communication and ammunition dumps in the enemy's rear areas.

Intensive low-level ground attack work was carried out after the German spring offensive, in March 1918; 46 Squadron suffered high casualties as a result.

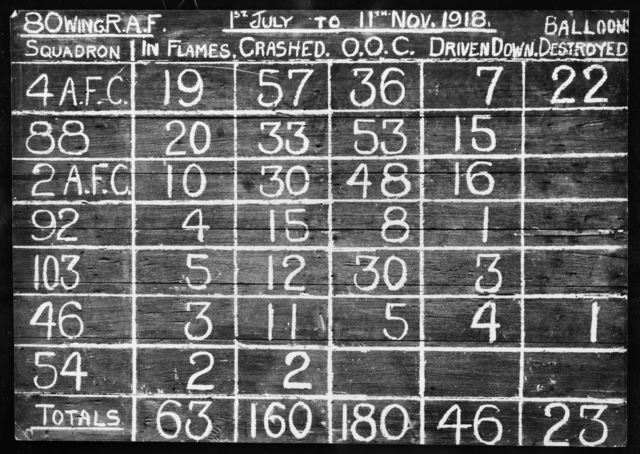
A scoreboard listing the claims for aircraft destroyed by No. 80 Wing between July and November 1918.

In June 1918, the squadron became part of No. 80 Wing RAF, at Serny, Pas-de-Calais. From 26 June, it was commanded by Lieutenant-Colonel Louis Strange. The wing specialised in large scale attacks on enemy airfields. In October and November, the squadron was heavily involved in attacks during the German Great Retreat, during the weeks before the signing of the Armistice.

Towards the end of January 1919, the squadron was reduced to a cadre, and in February it was returned to England early; it was disbanded on 31 December.

During the war, 46 Squadron claimed 184 air victories, creating 16 aces.

- Donald MacLaren joined the squadron in November 1917. MacLaren was credited with shooting down 48 aeroplanes and six balloons, making him one of the top aces of World War I;
- Cecil (Chaps) Marchant;
- George Thomson;
- Harry Robinson;
- Clive Brewster-Joske;
- Roy McConnell, DFC;
- Maurice D. G. Scott;
- Maurice Freehill;
- Philip Tudhope.
- Arthur Gould Lee, who authored No Parachute and later achieved the rank of later Air Vice Marshal
- Victor Yeates, the author of Winged Victory,

== Between wars ==
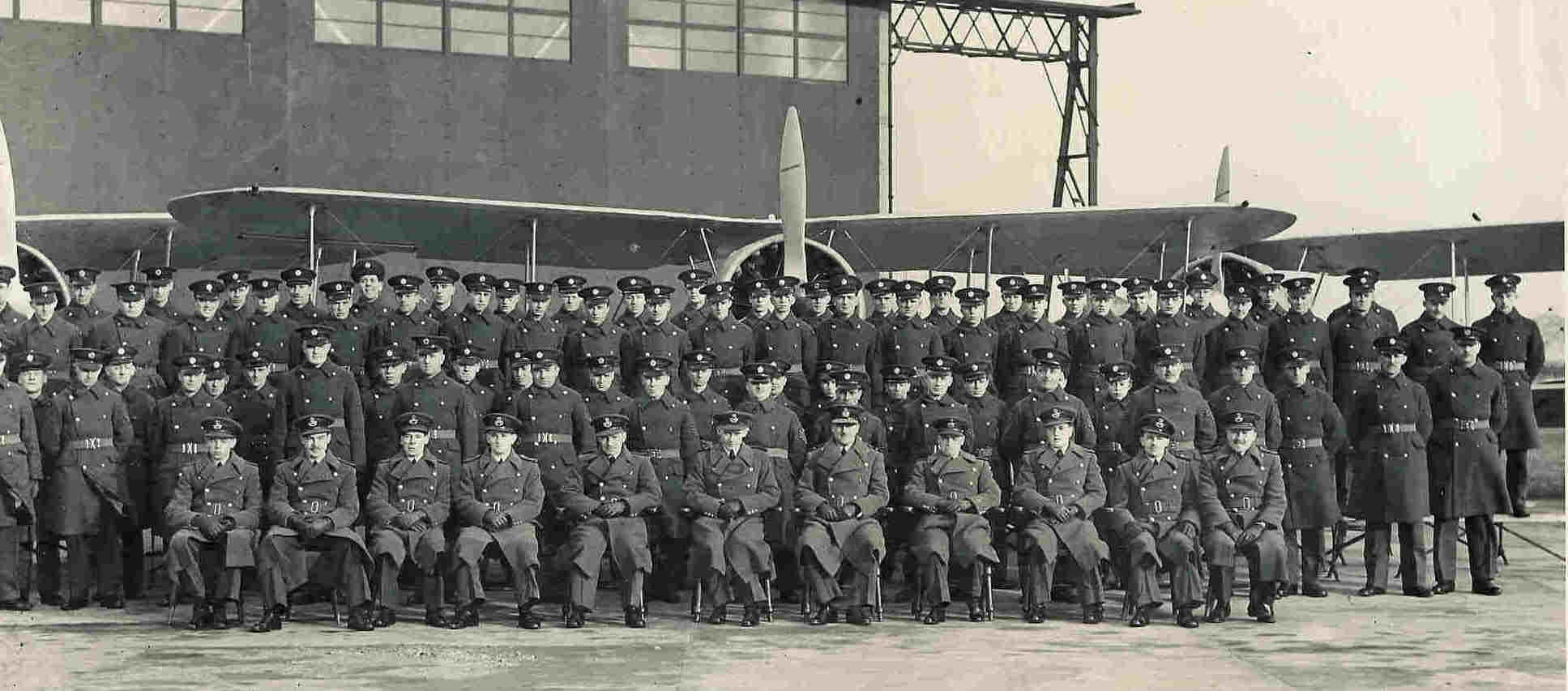
AOC presents Squadron Plaque to 46 Squadron at RAF Kenley, 1938.

The squadron was re-formed at Kenley under the RAF expansion scheme in 1936 by equipping B flight of No. 17 Squadron RAF as a full squadron. Gloster Gauntlets were the first airplanes to be allocated, and with these craft normal peacetime training activities were carried out. Wing Commander Bunny Currant, a future ace, joined the squadron as a sergeant pilot. Wing Commander Ian Gleed DSO DFC, another future ace, was posted the squadron as his first assignment after earning his wings on Christmas Day 1936.

== World War II ==
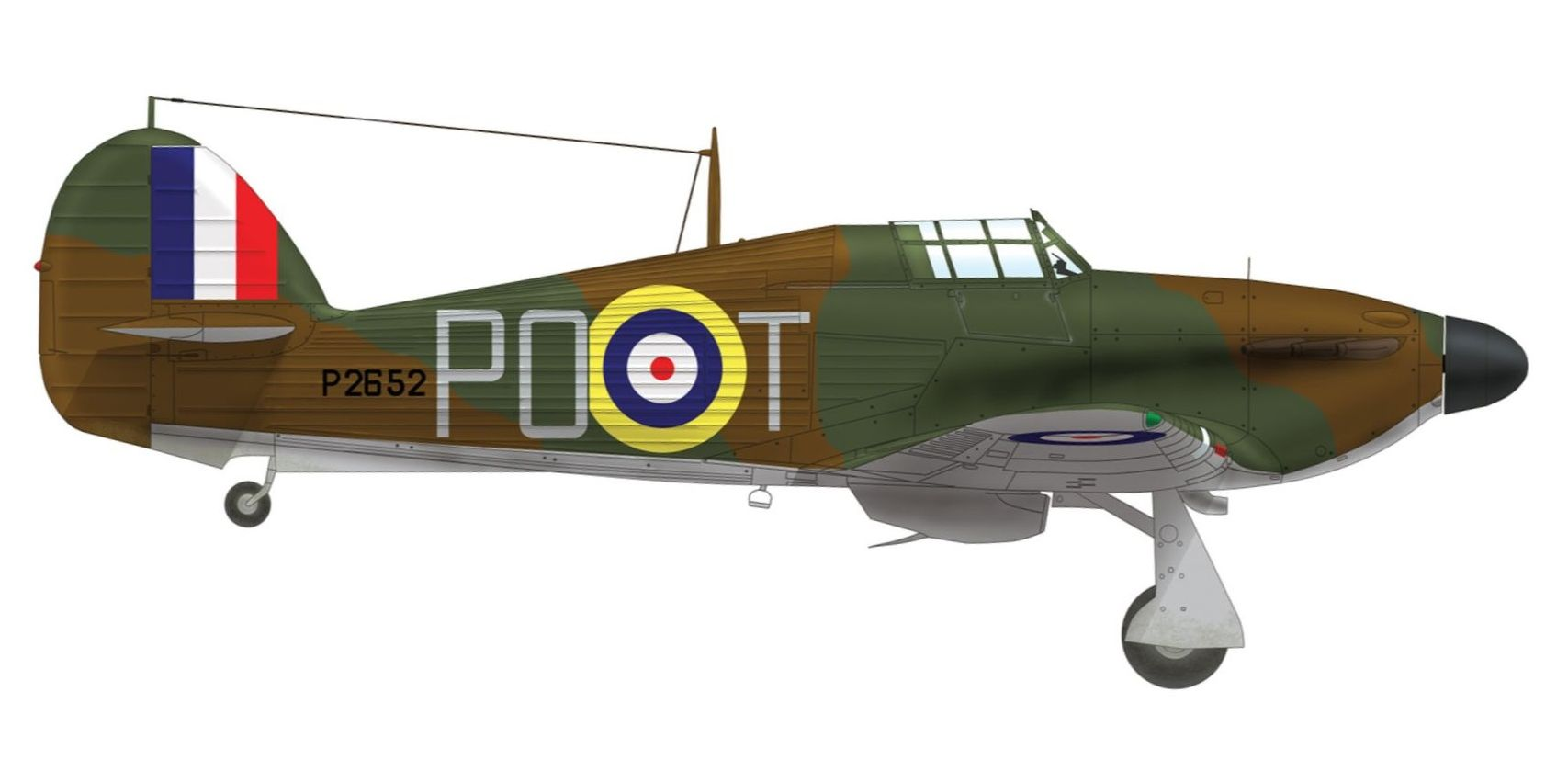
Hurricane Mk I of 46 Squadron during the Norwegian Campaign, May 1940. This aircraft was abandoned in Norway

=== Norway ===
The outbreak of war found 46 Squadron at RAF Digby, equipped with Hawker Hurricanes. Action with the enemy came quickly when, at the end of October 1939, Squadron Leader Barwell, Pilot Officer Plummer and F/Sgt Edward Shackley attacked a formation of 12 Heinkel 115s, destroying one each, and scattering the remainder. The next six months were uneventful, consisting in the main of providing air cover for the shipping convoys steaming along the East Coast; a few enemy aircraft were sighted but no contacts were made.

In May 1940, the squadron was selected to form part of the Expeditionary Force in Norway, which had been invaded by the Germans on 9 April. The Hurricanes were embarked on HMS Glorious and, despite doubts that a Hurricane could take off from a carrier flight deck in a flat calm, they all took to the air without difficulty, thanks to the efforts of the ship's engineers, who managed to get the Glorious up to a speed of 30 knots. No. 46 Squadron assembled at Bardufoss and began operation on 26 May; patrols were maintained over the land and naval forces at Narvik without respite, some of the pilots going without sleep for more than 48 hours. Conditions on the ground were very basic with poor runways and primitive servicing and repair facilities.

Many air combats took place, and in its brief campaign in Norway the squadron accounted for at least 14 enemy aircraft, besides probably destroying many others. On 7 June the squadron was ordered to evacuate Norway immediately and, on the night of 7 through 8 June, the Hurricanes were successfully flown back to Glorious — a dangerous procedure as none of the aircraft were fitted with deck arrester hooks. In fact this would be the first time that high-performance monoplanes without tailhooks had landed on an aircraft carrier. The Hurricanes of 46 Squadron had been flown off from their land bases to keep them from being destroyed in the evacuation after the pilots discovered that a 15 lb (7 kg) sandbag carried in the rear of the Hurricane allowed full brakes to be applied immediately on landing.

The ground parties embarked on HMS Vindictive and SS Monarch of Bermuda and reached the UK safely, but the squadron's aircraft and eight of its pilots were lost when Glorious was sunk by German battleships Scharnhorst and Gneisenau on 9 June 1940. The two pilots who survived were the Squadron Commander, Squadron Leader (later Air Chief Marshal) Kenneth Cross, and the Flight Commander, Flight Lieutenant (later Air Commodore) Patrick Jameson. There were 44 survivors and 1500 dead.

=== Battle of Britain ===
The squadron re-formed at RAF Digby, becoming operational once again at the end of June, and for the next two months it was occupied in uneventful convoy and defensive patrols before moving south to Stapleford Tawney, the satellite of RAF North Weald, for the defence of London during the Battle of Britain. The Luftwaffe's main effort at the time was against coastal objectives and shipping off the coast of Essex and Kent.

The squadron, now consisting of novice pilots and without any experienced command after its decimation in Norway, suffered heavy casualties during continuous action against far superior numbers of enemy bombers and escorting fighters. But the enemy sustained such shattering losses amongst their long-range bomber forces that they had to change their tactics. The attacking forces began to fly their fighter bombers at very high altitudes and to make use of every possible patch of cloud cover. Interception became difficult, and the squadron had to change its tactics too – principally maintaining patrols at heights between 20,000 and 30,000 feet.

On 11 November 1940, No. 46 Squadron, whilst on patrol over the town of Foulness, encountered some 50 Italian bombers and fighters; nine of them were destroyed, with no casualties or damage to the squadron, and the remainder of the Italians scattered in disorder.

The squadron claimed 34 aircraft destroyed July to December 1940, but lost 26 aircraft itself, with 16 pilots killed and three badly wounded. After the Battle of Britain ended, the squadron was engaged in convoy patrols, interspersed with escort duty to medium bombers in their attack on objectives in occupied France.

=== North Africa ===
In May 1941, the squadron was withdrawn from the line in preparation for going overseas; they embarked on the SS Almanzora at the end of the month. The ground crews reached Egypt early in July and with the squadron headquarters at Kilo 17 Fayoum Road, various detachments cooperated in the formation of maintenance, repair, and salvage units.

Pilots were operating in the defence of Malta, first as 46 Squadron and later absorbed into 126 Squadron. They were in action continuously, claiming the destruction of nearly 10 German and 10 Italian aircraft,

In May 1942, the airmen moved to Idku and reformed as a night fighter squadron with Beaufighters for action in the eastern Mediterranean. They became operational at the end of the month, and their main tasks were the interception of enemy reconnaissance and bombing aircraft, principally over Alexandria, and the escort of shipping convoys laden with supplies for Malta. At the end of October, after the 8th Army's advance from El Alamein, 46 Squadron carried out attacks on the retreating enemy columns in the Mersa Matruh area.

In November 1942, the squadron was reorganised as part of the RAF Coastal Command and operated convoy cover in Malta and Benghazi. Targets in Africa and Sicily were strafed and barges, trawlers and other small ships were attacked along the Tripolitanian coast with cannon and machine-gun fire. The New Year found the squadron preparing to resume its original role as a night fighter unit and at the end of January, two detachments left Idku — one for Tobruk and the other for RAF Abu Sueir. By the end of April two more detachments were operating at St. Jean (Palestine) and Bu Amud. With the most distant bases nearly 1,000 miles apart, administration of the squadron became very difficult.

Some out-of-the-ordinary tasks came the squadron's way. On one occasion, the Bu Amud detachment searched and found a convoy of local troops who were lost in the desert and long overdue; on another a grounded destroyer was located and given air cover until it could be refloated.

In April 1943, for the first time in the war a night fighter was controlled from a warship – the squadron's signal officer, Flight Lieutenant Muir a Canadian, having devised a homing beacon for use on the controlling ship. In July, with confirmed "kills" for one year's operations in the Middle East standing at 31, the squadron helped shepherd the invasion fleet sailing for Sicily. The end of August found a large detachment stationed in Cyprus with the main task of doing night intruder operations over Rhodes. On 14 September, Squadron leader Cuddie in command of the detachment, landed on the recently seized Dodecanese Island of Kos — the first Allied aircraft to do so; less than three weeks later the Germans invaded and Wing Commander G.A. Reid was killed.

In early 1944, with detachments operating from Abu Sueir, St. Jean and Tocra, night intruder patrols over Rhodes, Kos and Crete formed the backbone of activities. In February and March, the squadron claimed the destruction of five Junkers Ju 52s and the probable destruction of three more. April and May were quiet, despite the dovetailing of patrols with No. 252 Squadron over the islands, giving complete coverage from dusk to dawn. In September, the aircraft were controlled by HMS Ulster Queen, a Ground-controlled interception ship and the score for the month amounted to 11 enemy aircraft destroyed.

From 26 September to 11 October (a full-moon period) a detachment was established at Gambut and 16 enemy aircraft were destroyed, with one probable and four damaged. Four airmen were decorated for their part:

- Warrant Officer Roy Butler (pilot), distinguished flying cross (five planes destroyed)
- Warrant Officer Ray Graham (navigator), distinguished flying cross
- Warrant Officer Denis Hammond (pilot), distinguished flying cross (three destroyed or damaged)
- Flight Sergeant Harrison (navigator) distinguished flying medal

A Ju 52 destroyed by the detachment on 3 October was the last German aircraft destroyed by the squadron and with the withdrawal of German forces from Greece almost completed, the airmen ended their mission.

=== End of the war ===
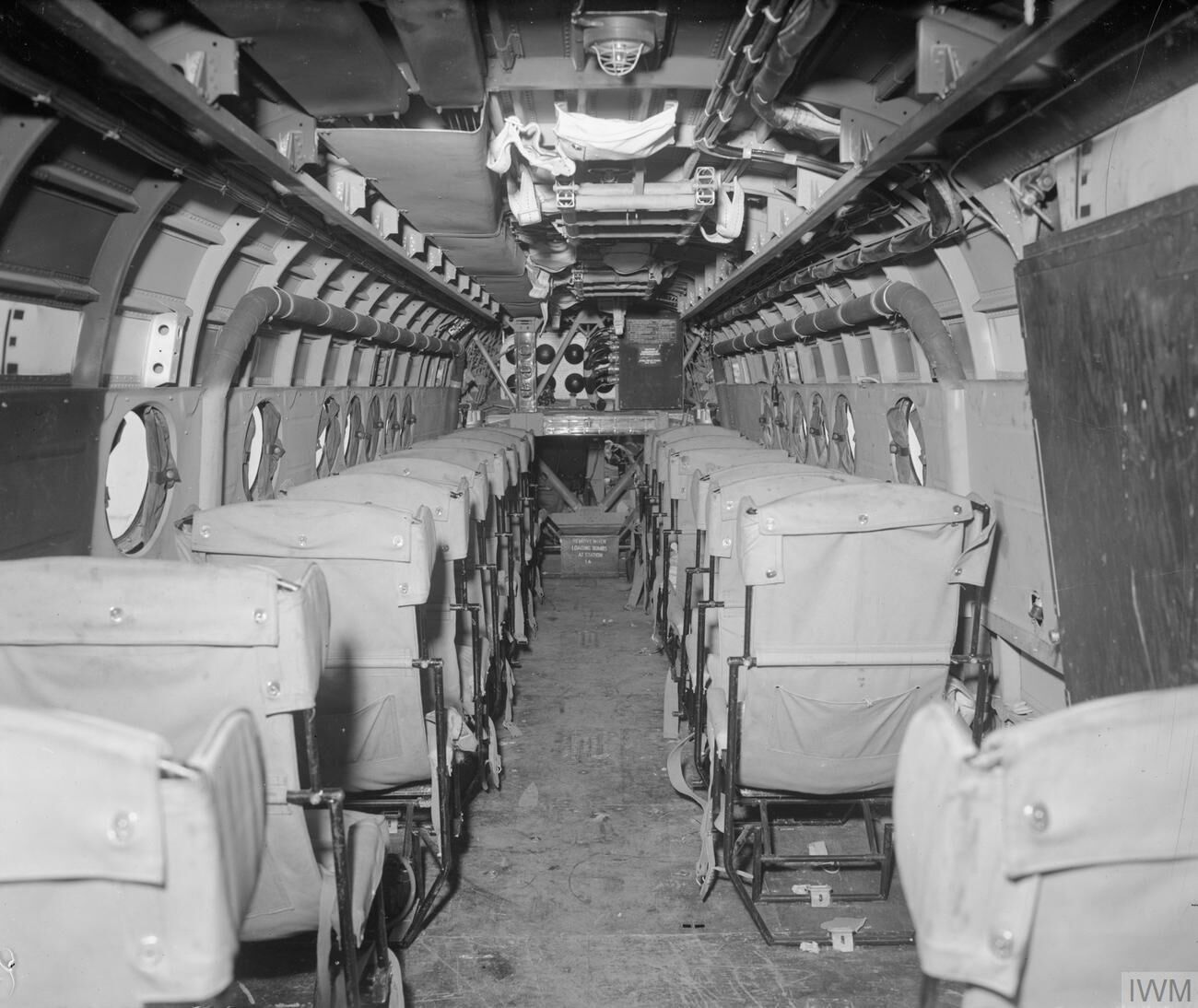
Interior of Short Stirling Mark V of Transport Command fitted with seating, 1944

The airmen arrived at RAF Stoney Cross at the beginning of January 1945 and began operation under Transport Command. Equipped with the Short Stirling, they manned service to the Far East between Stoney Cross and RAF Arkonam via Poona and between Stoney Cross and Dum Dum via Palam. With the end of the war in August 1945, flights were first confined to India and the Middle East and then, with Dakotas replacing the Stirlings at the beginning of 1946, passengers and freight were carried mostly to Rome, Berlin, Warsaw, and Vienna.

== Berlin Airlift ==
The squadron moved to RAF Manston in October 1946 and to Abingdon in December. From July 1948, the squadron was almost exclusively engaged on the Berlin Airlift; it operated at first from Wunsdorf, carrying food, and later from Fassberg and Lübeck, carrying coal. It returned to RAF Oakington in August 1949 and resumed its normal transport role until it disbanded on 20 February 1950.

== First postwar re-formation ==
=== Meteors ===
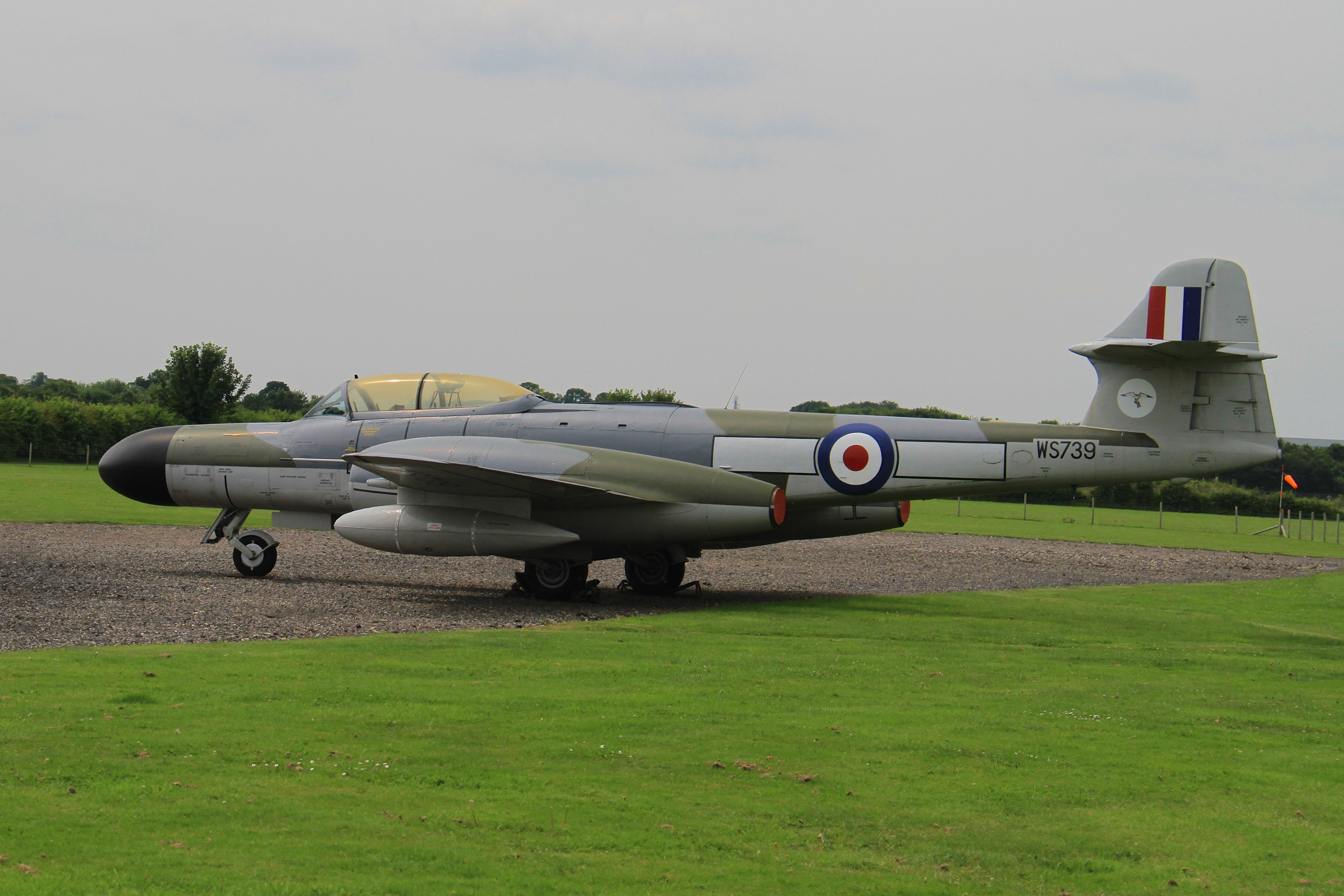
Gloster Meteor NF.14

The squadron once again re-formed, this time at RAF Odiham on 15 August 1954 as a night fighter unit equipped with Meteor NF12s and 14s. Training began almost immediately, but it took until the end of October for the squadron to reach a strength of 12 NF12 or 14s and one Meteor 7 for training and categorisation.

When Wing Commander Birchfield took over as commanding officer from Squadron Leader Ross, the manpower situation was improving, but mechanical-transport shortages caused problems for the squadron, whose dispersal was on the opposite side of the airfield from the rest of the station. By June 1955, the squadron had received "some Meteor 8s for target towing" and its strength had reached 48 officers and 110 airmen. By August, when the squadron went to Acklington for its armament practice station, there were 16 aircraft.

=== Javelins ===
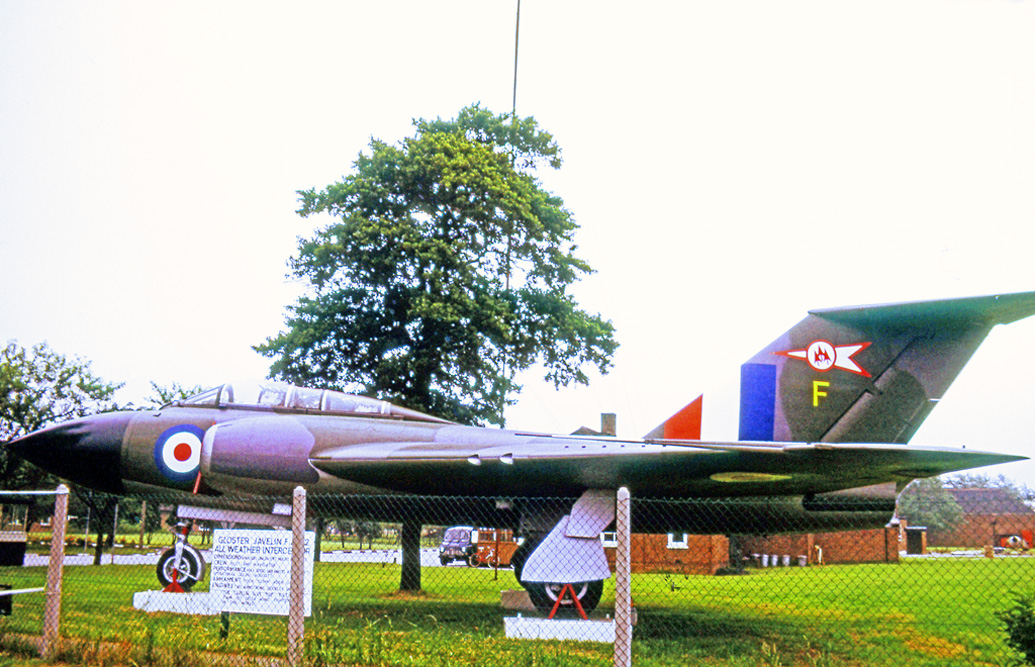
Gloster Javelin FAW.2 preserved wearing the markings of No. 46 Squadron which it served between August 1957 and June 1961.

In January 1956, the unit began converting to Javelins, and the first arrived in February, together with eight Meteor NF 11s: the NF 12s were sent off to No. 72 Squadron RAF. By May, all squadron pilots had converted and 15 Javelins were held; eight were earmarked for intensive flying trials whose target was 1,000 hours in two months – a feat believed by some to be impossible, but achieved in fact by "a wartime spirit." On 15 June, the squadron lost its commanding officer, Wing Commander Birchfield, in a Javelin crash. He was replaced by Wing Commander Harold White.

Over the years, the squadron continued to train by participating in many exercises such as Halyard, Cold Wing, Kingpin Adex, Ciano and Bombex, and it took part in various trials, including those of new pressure suits and helmets. The problem of poor serviceability and lack of spares continued when the Mk 2 Javelins replaced the Mk 1s in 1957. Two Mk6 Javelins were briefly used during the 1958 display season due to shortage of serviceable Mk 2s.

In April 1959, the squadron sent six Javelins for an exchange visit to the French Air Force 1/30 Squadron at Tours, whilst the French sent Sud Aviation Vautour aircraft to Odiham. In June the squadron won the Ingpen Trophy after being third in 1957 and second in 1958. On 30 June 1961, the squadron was disbanded again.

== Second postwar re-formation ==
=== Andovers ===
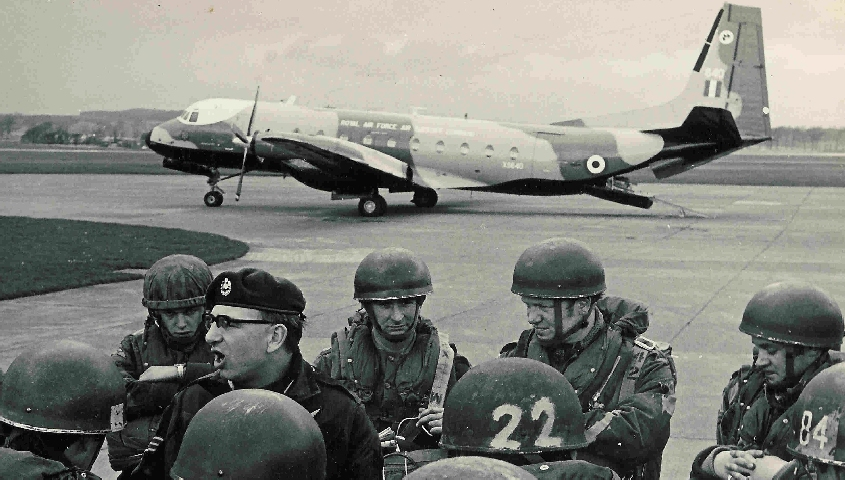
Exercise MACDROP parachute briefing. Note the kneeling Andover aircraft.

On 1 September 1966, the squadron again was re-formed, this time at RAF Abingdon as a transport unit. The first Hawker Siddeley Andover CMk1 aircraft arrived in December, and the squadron was tasked with transport support and tactical transport, for which the Andover's ability to "kneel" – to allow vehicle entry at a shallow angle via the rear ramp – was an asset. Over the years, the squadron acquired expertise in aero-medical evacuation, short take-off and landing, route flying and parachute and one-ton container drops. In addition to carrying equipment, vehicles, passengers or paratroops, the Andover could be fitted in a VIP role and carried Cabinet Ministers including (the late) John Davies, Julian Amery and Lord Carrington and was used for the parachute jump of HRH Prince Charles into Studland Bay during his RAF training in July 1971.

It also carried out various trials with voice broadcast and long-range ferry tanks. The latter became a regular item of equipment and enabled the short-range Andover to fly long distances, such as Gander to Abingdon direct in well under eight hours.

The detachment took part in exercises in Libya, Cyprus, the Middle East, and Norway, as well as in the UK and Germany. It won the Lord VC Trophy in 1968 and again in 1971, when it also won the No. 14 Air Dispatch Trophy. In July 1968, the squadron supported Exercise Icy Mountains in Greenland, re-supplying it, and finally recovering the team. In March 1969, three aircraft were deployed to Coolidge, Antigua, to help with the Anguillan crisis. The deployment continued, albeit later at a reduced scale, until early 1971 and led to the Caribbean Trainers. The squadron was the first in the RAF to have a German exchange officer, and exchange visits were made between 46 Squadron and LTG 63 at Ahlhorn and Hohn in Germany.

In August 1969, the unit became involved in Northern Ireland duties – in particular, personnel transport – and on 13 October the same year, it was presented with its standard by King Olav V of Norway in commemoration of the squadron's 1940 Norwegian operation.

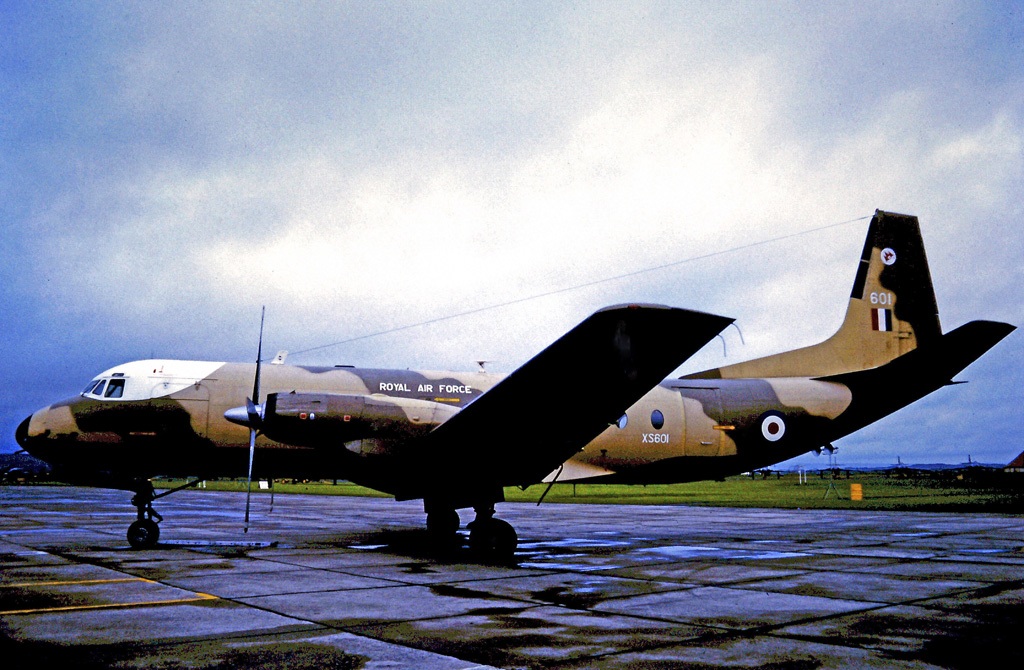
46 Squadron Andover C.1 in 1971

In September 1970, the squadron moved to RAF Thorney Island and began a period of extended worldwide activity by taking part in a large Far East reinforcement exercise, Bersatu Padu. In 1971 it began a two-aircraft detachment at Masirah (and added SAR to its many roles). In November 1971 and February 1972, it took part in Exercise Cold Stream with the Italian Air Force at Pisa and in Exercise Sun Pirate in Puerto Rico.

While flying the RAF Falcons on 8 April 1972, the Royal Air Force Parachute Team, one of Sqn 46's Andover, XS-609, crashed on takeoff at Siena, Italy, killing four passengers.

Twice a year, the squadron took part in Exercise MACDROP at RAF Machrihanish, in which Andovers were employed in parachute dropping with the Parachute Regiment, and SAS. In January and December 1974, unit aircraft supported Royal Engineers in Exercise Mirza – four-month civil-aid programmes whose main task was the construction of bridges in Sudan.

Finally, in March 1975 the closure of RAF Thorney Island and the dissolution of the squadron was announced. An immediate reduction in the number of aircraft and a drastic reduction in flying hours followed. On 31 August 1975 the squadron standard was laid up in Chichester Cathedral, and the unit was disbanded. A number of Andovers were converted to flight calibration duties with No. 115 Squadron RAF at RAF Benson, two went to Boscombe Down and one (XS641) was shifted to photo reconnaissance role to provide the U.K.'s asset for the Open Skies Treaty. Later 10 Andovers were sold to the Royal New Zealand Air Force

== Reunions ==
The squadron is unique in the Royal Air Force because it is the only one to have held reunions since 1917. The squadron's Association has held annual Reunion Dinners continuously since 1917. The 100th consecutive Reunion was held in the Officers' Mess, RAF Benson, on 3 June 2017.

== Aircraft ==
Aircraft operated by No. 46 Squadron from 1916 to 1975
Model	Service dates
Nieuport 12	Apr 1916 – Apr 1917
BE2c	Nov 1916 – Apr 1917
BE2e	Feb 1917 – Apr 1917
Pup	Apr 1917 – Nov 1917
Camel	Nov 1917 – Feb 1919
Gauntlet II	Sep 1936 – Feb 1939
Hurricane I	Feb 1939 – Dec 1940
Hurricane IIA	Dec 1940 – May 1941
Hurricane IIC	May 1941 – Jun 1941
Beaufighter I	May 1942 – Jul 1942
Beaufighter VI	May 1942 – Dec 1944
Beaufighter X	Apr 1944 – Jul 1944
Mosquito XII	Apr 1944 – Jul 1944
Stirling V	Feb 1945 – Feb 1946
Dakota III, IV	Feb 1946 – Feb 1950
Meteor NF 12	Aug 1954 – Mar 1956
Meteor NF 14	Aug 1954 – Mar 1956
Javelin FAW 1	Mar 1956 – Nov 1957
Javelin FAW 2	Aug 1957 – Jun 1961
Javelin FAW 6	Jun 1958 – Oct 1958
Andover CMk1	Dec 1966 – Aug 1975

== Locations ==
Bases for No. 46 Squadron from formation to disbandment
Location	Assignment dates
Wyton Aerodrome	Apr 1916 – Oct 1916
Boisdinghem	May 1917 – May 1917
La Gorgue	May 1917 – Jul 1917
Bruay	Jul 1917 – Jul 1917
Sutton's Farm	Jul 1917 – Aug 1917
Ste Marie Cappel	Aug 1917 – Sep 1917
(Izel) Le Hameau	Sep 1917 – May 1918
Liettres	May 1918 – Jun 1918
Serny	Jun 1918 – Aug 1918
Poulainville	Aug 1918 – Sep 1918
Cappy	Sep 1918 – Oct 1918
Athies	Oct 1918 – Oct 1918
Busigny	Oct 1918 – Nov 1918
Baizieux	Nov 1918 – Feb 1919
Rendcomb	Feb 1919 – Feb 1919 (disbanded)
Re-formed out of 'B' Flt, No. 17 Sqn, Kenley	3 September 1936
RAF Kenley	Sep 1936 – Nov 1937
RAF Digby	Nov 1937 – Nov 1939
RAF Acklington	Nov 1939 – Jan 1940
RAF Digby	Jan 1940 – May 1940
HMS Glorious	May 1940 – May 1940
Skaanland	May 1940 – May 1940
Bardufoss	May 1940 – Jun 1940
HMS Glorious	Jun 1940 – Jun 1940
RAF Digby	Jun 1940 – Sep 1940
RAF Stapleford Tawney	Sep 1940 – Nov 1940
RAF North Weald	Nov 1940 – Dec 1940
RAF Digby	Dec 1940 – Feb 1941
RAF Church Fenton	Feb 1941 – Mar 1941
RAF Sherburn-in-Elmet	Mar 1941 – May 1941
En route Egypt	May 1941 – Jul 1941
Abu Sueir	Jul 1941 – Sep 1941
Kilo 17	17 September 1941 – May 1942
Idku	May 1942 – Dec 1944
RAF Stoney Cross	Jan 1945 – Oct 1946
RAF Manston	Oct 1946 – Dec 1946
RAF Abingdon	Dec 1946 – Aug 1949
RAF Oakington	Aug 1949 – Feb 1950 (disbanded)
RAF Odiham	Aug 1954 – Jul 1959
RAF Waterbeach	Jul 1959 – Jun 1961 (disbanded)
RAF Abingdon	Sep 1966 – Sep 1970
RAF Thorney Island	Sep 1970 – Aug 1975 (disbanded)

== Commanding officers ==
Rank	Name	Date of command
Major	G. E. Todd	April 1916
Major	E. L. Conran	May 1916
Major	L. Dawes	May 1916
Major	P. Babington	July 1916
Major	R. H. S. Mealing	December 1917
Major	A. H. O'Hara-Wood	July 1918
Major	G. Allen	October 1918
Squadron Leader	M. F. Calder	September 1936
Squadron Leader	P. R. Barwell	June 1937
Squadron Leader	K. B. B. Cross	October 1939
Squadron Leader	J. R. Maclachlan	June 1940
Squadron Leader	A. R. Collins	October 1940
Squadron Leader	L. M. Gaunce	October 1940
Squadron Leader	A. C. Rabagliati	December 1940
Wing Commander	G. A. Reid	May 1942
Wing Commander	T. P. K. Scade	October 1943
Wing Commander	R. W. Dennison	June 1944
Squadron Leader	G. E. Robertson	August–November 1944 (Temp Command)
Wing Commander	B. A. Coventry	January 1945
Wing Commander	S. G. Baggott	December 1945
Wing Commander	G. Dutton	March 1946
Wing Commander	G. Burges	July 1946
Squadron Leader	E. Moody	October 1947
Squadron Leader	A. G. Salter	April 1948
Squadron Leader	A. Reece	August 1949
Squadron Leader	D. F. C. Ross	August 1954 (on re-forming)
Wing Commander	F. E. W. Birchfield	March 1955
Wing Commander	H. E. White	June 1956
Wing Commander	F. B. Sowrey	May 1958
Wing Commander	D. B. Wills	June 1960
Squadron Leader	M. T. Rayson	September 1966 (on re-forming)
Squadron Leader	J. B. Gratton	December 1967
Squadron Leader	D. O. Crwys-Williams	January 1970
Wing Commander	F. A. Mallett	February 1971
Wing Commander	J. A. Scambler	April 1973
Wing Commander	S Hitchen	March 1975
