= Donald MacLaren =

Donald Roderick MacLaren
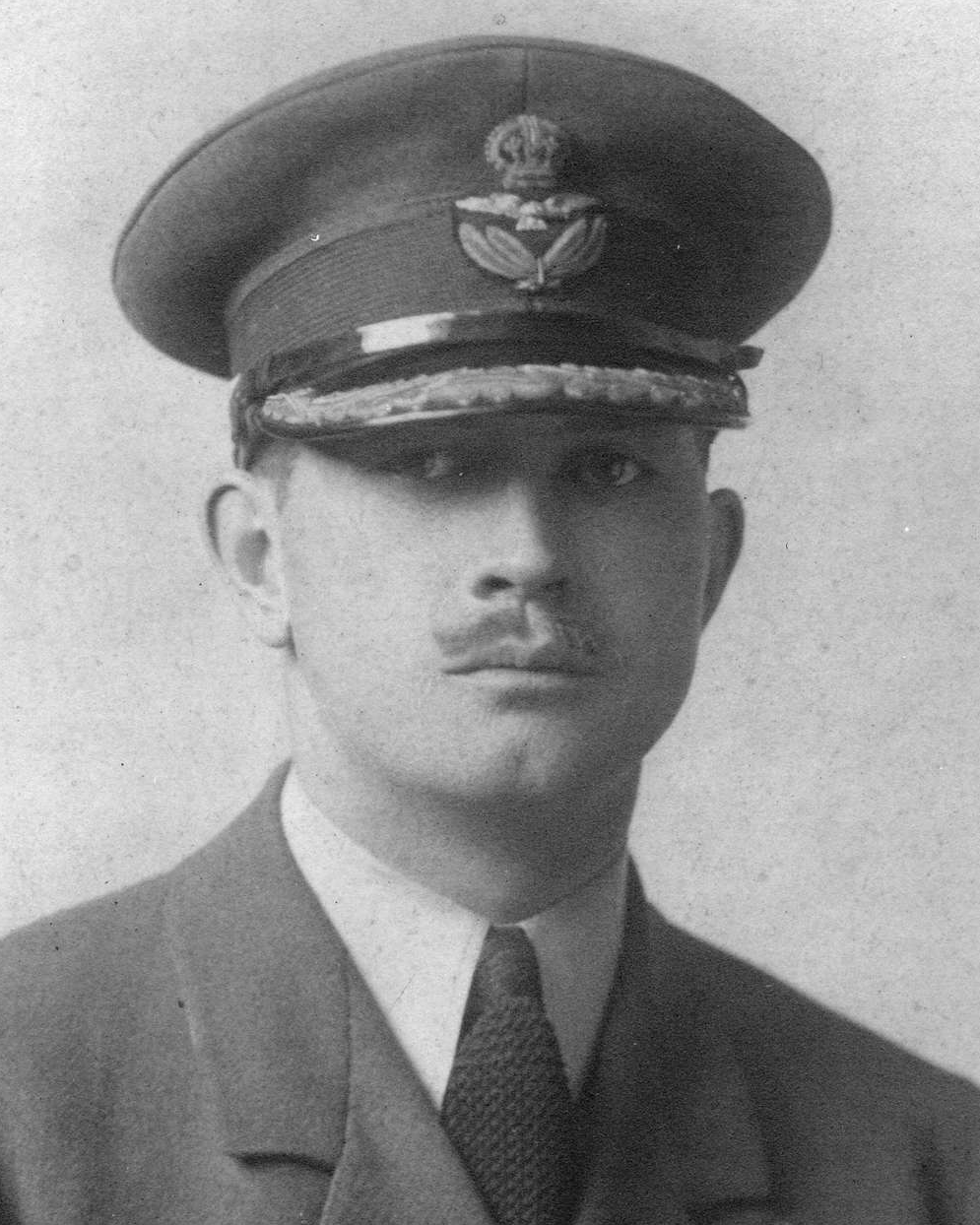
- Born: 28 May 1893; Ottawa, Ontario, Canada
- Died: 4 July 1988 (aged 95); Burnaby, British Columbia, Canada
- Military career
- Allegiance: United Kingdom
- Branch: Royal Flying Corps; Royal Canadian Air Force
- Service years: 1917–1920
- Rank: Major
- Conflicts: First World War
- Awards: Distinguished Service Order; Military Cross & Bar; Distinguished Flying Cross; Legion of Honour (France); Croix de Guerre (France)
- Other work: Superintendent of Canadian Airways, Ltd; Founder of Air Cadet League of Canada

Donald Roderick MacLaren, DSO, MC & Bar, DFC (28 May 1893 – 4 July 1988) was a Canadian flying ace of the First World War.

== Early life ==
Donald MacLaren was born in Ottawa but his family moved first to Calgary in 1899, then to Vancouver in 1911. In 1912 MacLaren went to Montreal to study at McGill University. In 1914 an illness forced him to abandon his studies and he returned to Vancouver. After recovering MacLaren, his father and his brother opened a fur trading post at a remote point on the Peace River. While there MacLaren learned to speak Cree.

== First World War ==
In 1916 the family gave up the trading post to help in the war effort. MacLaren's father was not allowed to join the army so he got a job with the Imperial Munitions Board. His sons did enlist – Donald joining the Royal Flying Corps. He did his initial training at 90 Central Training School at Armour Heights and then at Camp Borden in Ontario, then finally received further training in England at No. 43 Training School, Ternhill. He was then transferred into No. 34 Training School for final fighter orientation on the Bristol Scout and Sopwith Camel, completing 9 hours solo on the Camel. On 23 November 1917 he was sent to France where he joined No. 46 Squadron. His first air combat was in February 1918, where MacLaren successfully shot down a German fighter 'out of control'.

He was awarded the Military Cross for a sortie on 21 March 1918 in which he helped destroy a railway gun with his bombs, then shot down a balloon and two German LVG two-seaters. In September he was awarded the Distinguished Flying Cross. When the squadron commander was killed in a crash later in the year MacLaren was given command.

In late October MacLaren, who had escaped injury in combat, broke his leg during a friendly wrestling match with another member of his squadron. He was sent back to England on 6 November and was in the hospital when the Armistice was announced. He was awarded the Distinguished Service Order for his leadership of the squadron in the last months of the war.

MacLaren finished the war with a Military Cross and Bar, a Distinguished Flying Cross and the Distinguished Service Order. He was also awarded the French Legion of Honour and Croix de guerre. MacLaren claimed 1 aircraft shared captured, 5 (and 1 shared) balloons destroyed, 15 (and 6 shared) aircraft destroyed, and 18 (and 8 shared) aircraft 'down out of control'. This was despite the fact that his first dogfight was not until February 1918 and that he scored all his victories in only nine months. Among others, he probably shot down ace Mieczysław Garsztka on 2 October 1918 (shared with James Leith and Cyril Sawyer).

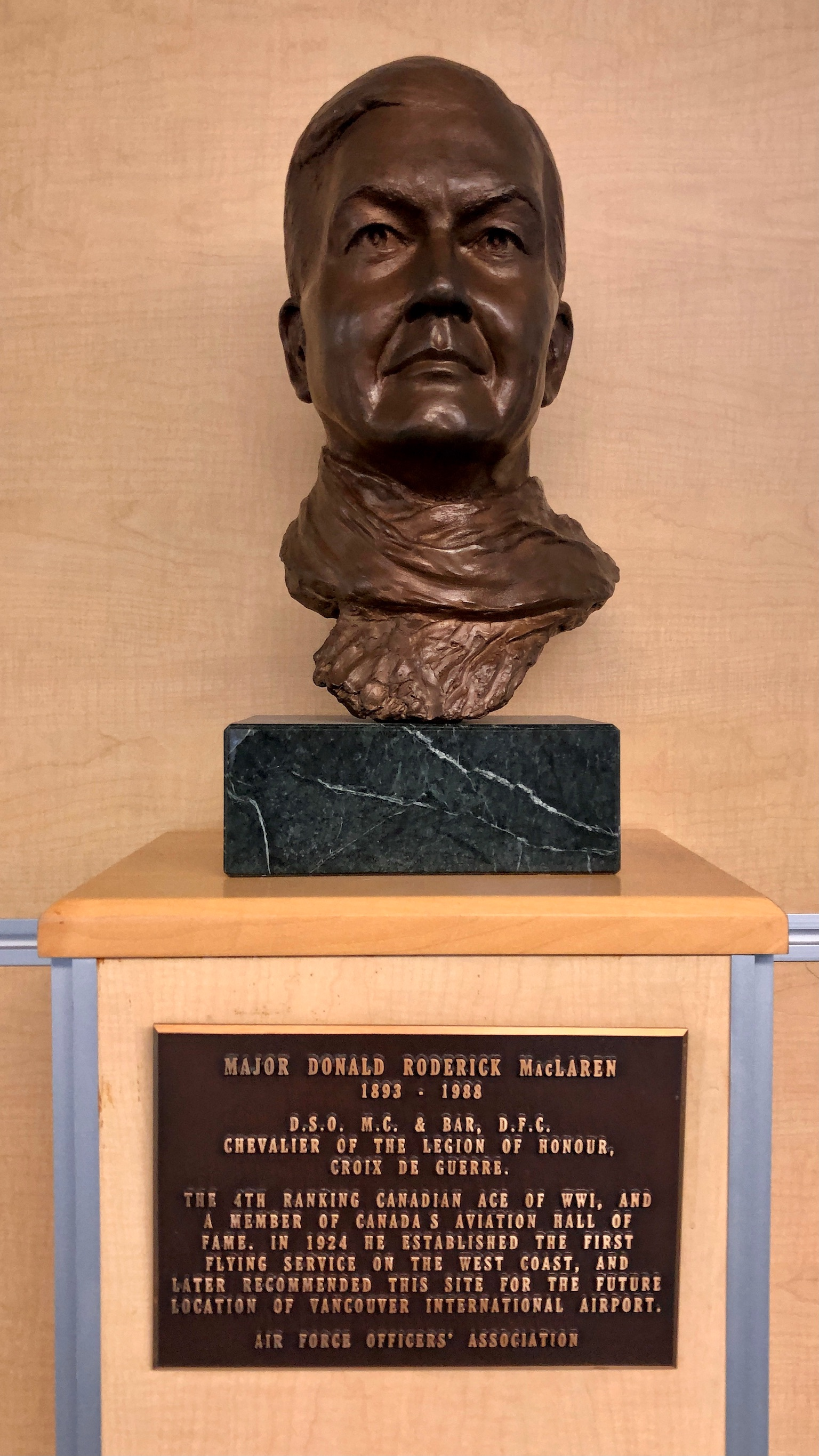
Bronze bust of Major Donald Roderick MacLaren at Vancouver International Airport Domestic Arrivals.

During his recovery, Donald MacLaren was attached to the newly formed Royal Canadian Air Force and oversaw Canadian pilots in England as they were transferred into the new organization. During this period, the British Air Ministry allocated 112 aircraft to help establish the foundation of the RCAF. MacLaren returned to Canada on leave in late 1919, where he married Verna Harrison of Calgary. He went back to England in February 1920 but resigned from the RCAF later that year.

== Post-war ==
By 1922 MacLaren returned to Canada and in 1924 established the first flying service on the west coast, and by 1926 formed Pacific Airways which was eventually acquired by Western Canada Airways. In the early 1920s he had begun planning for a seaplane base, an RCAF station at Jericho Beach, Vancouver, used for seaplane and flying boat training. He later recommended an airport at Sea Island, opening as Sea Island Airport in 1931 and which by 1940 was used by the RCAF as a seaplane base station, which had relocated from Jericho, and evolved into what is now Vancouver International Airport. MacLaren died on 4 July 1988, aged 95. Having downed all of his 54 victories in the Sopwith Camel, he was the most successful pilot in the type.

He served in 46 Squadron RFC/RAF alongside V. M. Yeates, the author of the seminal First World War novel Winged Victory in which Tom Cundall, the main protagonist's flight commander is a Canadian called "Mac". It is widely believed that this character was based on MacLaren. He also served with Arthur Gould Lee, who authored No Parachute and later achieved the rank of air vice marshal.

== Sources ==
- Drew, George A. (1930). Canada's Fighting Airmen. MacLean.
