= Gaskell =

Gaskell is a Gaelic surname, a variant of Gaskill.

== People with the surname ==
- Charles George Milnes Gaskell (1842–1919), British lawyer and politician
- Lady Constance Gaskell (1885–1964), British courtier
- David Gaskell (1940–2025), British football player
- Dean Gaskell (born 1983), British rugby league player
- Elena Gaskell (born 2001), Canadian freestyle skier
- Elizabeth Gaskell (1810–1865), British novelist and biographer
- George Gaskell, British social psychologist
- Holbrook Gaskell (1813–1909), British industrialist and collector
- Holbrook Gaskell II (1846–1919), British chemical industrialist
- Holbrook Gaskell III (1878–1951), British chemical industrialist
- James Gaskell, (born 1990), Rugby Union player for Sale Sharks
- James Milnes Gaskell (1810–1873), British Conservative politician
- Jane Gaskell (born 1941), British fantasy novelist
- Lucy Gaskell (born 1980), British actress
- Philip Gaskell (1926–2001), British bibliographer and librarian
- Richard Gaskell, English footballer
- W. H. Gaskell (1847–1914), British physiologist
- William Gaskell (1805–1884), British minister and educator
- Whitney Gaskell (born 1972), American novelist

== See also ==
- Gaskill (disambiguation)
- Mary Gaitskill, American author
- Gaitskell
