= The Respectable Burgher =

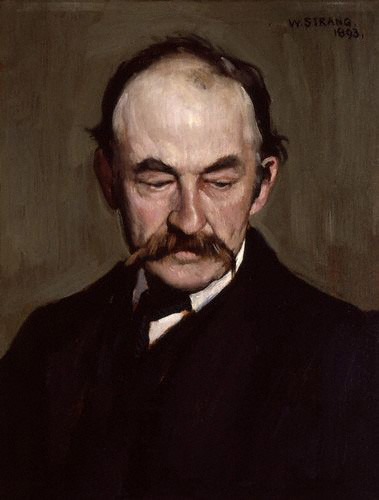
Portrait of Hardy by William Strang, 1893

"The Respectable Burgher on The Higher Criticism" is a poem by Thomas Hardy. It was originally published in 1901 in his collection Poems of the Past and the Present.

== Background ==
The "higher criticism" that Hardy refers to is criticism that refutes the literal truth of Biblical Scripture, and gives scientific evidence against the supposed revealed truth of the Bible.

== Critical response ==
Hardy had claimed that what couldn't be easily said in prose could be said in verse, and as there was no public outcry in regard to Poems of the Past and Present, along with "The Respectable Burgher" and its other contents, he seems to have been proven right. Criticism of the volume was mostly favorable; Sir George Douglas thought that it was better than Hardy's previous volume Wessex Poems and Other Verses, and The Saturday Review, although it repeated complaints that Hardy's poems were "harsh and unmusical", stated that "almost every poem had something to say with an arresting quality."
