= Holbrook Gaskell (born 1878) =

English industrialist (1878–1951)

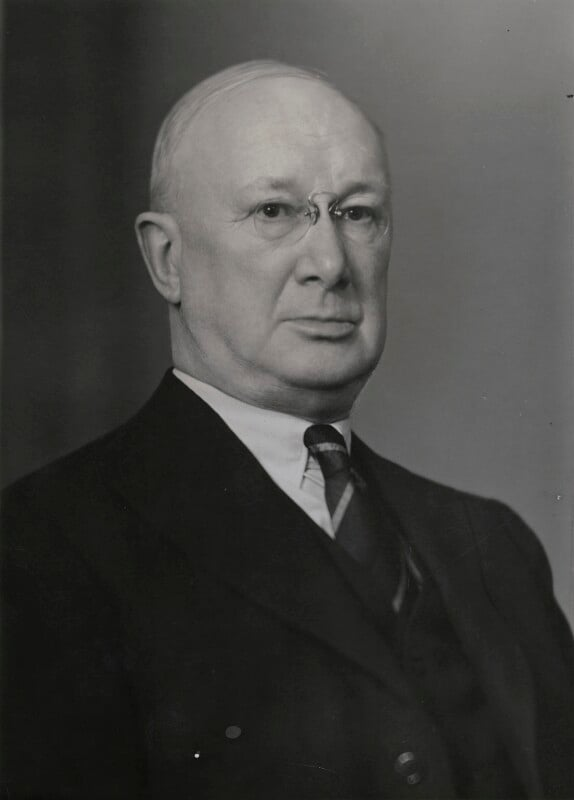
Gaskell in 1948

Sir Holbrook Gaskell OBE MIEE AMIMechE (12 November 1878 – 31 March 1951) was a chemical industrialist in Widnes, Lancashire, England.

He was born on the 12 November 1878, the son of Holbrook Gaskell Jr., Esq., of Frodsham, Cheshire and the grandson of Holbrook Gaskell, founder of Gaskell, Deacon & Co. He was educated at Rugby School and Trinity College, Cambridge.

He became chief engineer of the United Alkali Company in 1914. After the outbreak of the First World War, he became responsible for designing and constructing plants to manufacture caustic soda and chlorine via the electrolysis of brine. He visited USA with Dr. J. T. Conroy to investigate the electrolytic chlorine processes in use there. He was appointed an Officer of the Order of the British Empire in the 1918 Birthday Honours for his work during the war.

With E. M. Hollingsworth he designed West Bank Power Station in the 1920s to supply power to the factories of the United Alkali Company. When this company joined with three other companies to form Imperial Chemical Industries in 1926, Gaskell became the chairman of its General Chemicals Group. Later he became technical director on the board of Imperial Chemical Industries and in 1942 he was knighted for his services to industry.

He married Emily Mary Ridgway on 21 February 1906 at St Peter's Church, Oughtrington, Lymm, Cheshire. They had no children. He died on 31 March 1951.
