= FE8 =

FE8 may refer to:

== Video games ==
- Fire Emblem: The Sacred Stones, the eighth game in the Fire Emblem series.

== Aircraft ==
- Royal Aircraft Factory F.E.8, biplane made during the first World War.
