= Patrick Larley =

British composer (born 1951)

Patrick B. C. Larley
- Born: 1951 (age 74–75); Frodsham, England
- Known for: Composer, Musician (English choral music)

Patrick Larley (born 1951) is a British composer.

== Biography ==
He was born in Frodsham, Cheshire, England and lived at Fearnhead in Warrington. Patrick is the third of the four children of Ian A. and Helen Dunsmuir/Larley:

Larley studied organ and singing at the Royal Manchester College of Music and became a Fellow of the Royal College of Organists. He pursued a career in cathedral music, holding posts of vicar choral in Wells Cathedral and then becoming sub-organist in St Asaph Cathedral, moving on to become master of choristers at Grimsby Minster and director of music at St James’ Choir School, Great Grimsby in Lincolnshire. After this he became director of music in Ellesmere College in Shropshire.

He is now a freelance composer, conductor, harpsichordist and organist, and is also musical director of Ludlow Choral Society in Shropshire and Birmingham Festival Choral Society, and formerly directed Nantwich Choral Society in Cheshire. He has founded and directs a number of vocal ensembles including Gallery Players and Chudleigh’s Company. He has given recitals in cathedrals and churches throughout Britain and has toured France, Germany, Czech Republic, Belgium, Italy and Ireland as a conductor and organist.

== Music ==
Much of Larley's output has been sacred choral music, ranging from short unaccompanied gems such as the well-known A Girl for the Blue through to full-scale works for choir, soloists and orchestra such as his Mass of a Thousand Ages written for the new millennium and first performed in April 2000. His musical style is fresh, tonal and approachable, with soft dissonances, soaring melodies and lilting syncopation, blending seamlessly his strong ecclesiastical roots in plainchant and monastic liturgy with the simplicity of a Celtic folk-like idiom. Reviewers and commentators have likened his musical style at various times to those of Gerald Finzi, William Mathias, John Rutter, Frederick Delius and Leonard Bernstein.

A number of his choral works have been recorded on CD, broadcast on BBC Radio 3 and performed widely in the UK and in America.

== Works ==
His works include:

=== Choir and orchestra ===
- A Mass of a Thousand Ages for choir, children's choir, mezzo-soprano and bass soloists, brass quintet, wind quartet and organ, 2000 (70'0")
- Appearing, Shining, Distant or Near for choir, high soprano solo, organ, piano and celeste, tubular bells and gong, 1998 (20'0")
- Stone Circles for choir, female semi-chorus, soprano solo, brass, organ and percussion, 1998 (65'0")

'In Praise of Music' for Chorus, Children's Choir, Soprano and Mezzo soloists, Orchestra (48')

'The Gentle Earth of Wales' for Chorus, Children's Choir, Soprano and Baritone soloists, Orchestra (50')

The Birmingham Spirituals for Chorus, Semi-chorus, strings, 2 sax, flute, steel pans, piano, perc.

=== Unaccompanied voices ===
- A Girl for the Blue for SATB and soprano solo (7'20")
- On the Edge of Glory - a meditation on the life of St. Columba for SATB, soprano and tenor solo, 1997 (10'50")
- Crucifying and Resurrection from Divine Poems by John Donne for SATB (5'40")
- The Dreame (John Donne) for SSAATTBB (8'0")
- To His Beloved - settings of four poems by W. B. Yeats: The Lake Isle of Innisfree, The Rose of Peace, He wishes for the cloths of heaven and When you are old and grey and full of sleep (16'0")
- Songs of the Cosmos - two songs for SATB with optional drones: The Song of the Stars and The Song of the Sky Loom (5'00")
- Heaven (echo poem) (George Herbert) for SATB/SA solo (2'30")
- A Glasse of Blessings (George Herbert) for SATB (3'30")
- Antiphon (George Herbert) for ATTBarB (2'30")
- Two Medieval Carols: Hayle, flowre of al vyrgynyte for SATB/ST solo (4'10") and Wolcum Yole! for SATB
- Good Friday Night for SATB/Mez solo (12'0")
- Wake now my love, for it is time for SATB (2'00")
- Responses for Treble Voices for SA

'The Salutation' SATB (6')

=== Choir and organ ===
- On Christmas Day for choir, mezzo-soprano solo and optional audience participation (25'0")
- Canticles of Light for choir, separate treble section and organ (2nd chamber organ optional)
- Irish Blessing for SATB, unison or treble voices with organ, piano or harp accompaniment
- The Gresford Mass - a congregational setting composed for All Saints’ Parish Church, Gresford, North Wales
- I said to the Man for SATB (3'0")
- Listen to me ye Coasts and Islands for SATB (4'0")
- O Lord, Support us for unison or treble voices (2'0")
- Psalm 150 (O Praise God in His Holiness) unison for congregation (1'50")
- Truly the Lord is in this Place for SATB (4'0")
- This Joyful Eastertide, an anthem for unison or treble voices (2'30")

=== Orchestral ===
- Worthenbury, a prelude for string orchestra (5'10")
- Sinfonia Nativitie for string orchestra, 1997 (12'0")
- Pneuma for symphonic wind band with piano, 1991 (12'0")
- Fanfara alla Fuga for symphony orchestra, 1994 (3'20")
- Fidden Sound for symphony orchestra (13'0")

=== Instrumental ===
- Carillon Victoria for organ (2'30")
- Fantasia on ‘St Andrew’ for organ (3'00")
- Offertory Prelude for organ (11'00")
- Sonatina for Classical Organ (7'30")
- The Farmington Suite for organ, piano or harpsichord (6'30")

=== Solo voice ===
- On a Fine Morning, a song cycle for tenor solo and piano, settings of five poems by Thomas Hardy: On a fine morning, A church romance, If it’s ever Spring again, The Darkling Thrush and Great things (13'0")
- My True Love for voice with piano or harpsichord: Now is the time at hand, Some there are as fair and My true love hath my heart
- Folksong arrangements for voice and piano: Barbara Allen, Jock O’Hazeldene, She moves through the fair, The Lincolnshire poacher and The sweet nightingale

== Recordings ==
Larley's music is available on a number of CDs including:

- The Rose of Peace - unaccompanied choral music performed by Chudleigh's Cumpanie
- A Girl for the Blue - Music for Advent and Christmas performed by Chudleigh's Cumpanie
- On a Fine Morning - music for solo voice and piano
- A Mass of a Thousand Ages - live recording of the first performance at St Mary's Parish Church, Nantwich on 8 April 2000, conducted by the composer (this recording was selected as one of the Musicweb International Recordings of the Year in 2005)
- Praise for Creation - performed by Ludlow Choral Society
