= Franklin Saunders =

Franklin Geoffrey Saunders
- Born: 3 June 1891; Swansea, Wales
- Died: Unknown
- Burial place: selsey, West Sussex
- Military career
- Allegiance: United Kingdom
- Branch: Royal Navy; British Army; Royal Air Force
- Service years: c. 1913–1919; 1921
- Rank: Captain
- Units: No. 47 Squadron RFC; No. 17 Squadron RFC
- Conflicts: World War I • Macedonian front
- Awards: Military Cross & Bar

Captain Franklin Geoffrey Saunders MC* (born 3 June 1891, date of death unknown) was a Welsh World War I flying ace credited with eight aerial victories.

== Military service ==
Saunders was serving as a sub-lieutenant in the Royal Naval Volunteer Reserve when he was granted Royal Aero Club Aviators' Certificate No. 721 after soloing a Bristol biplane at the Bristol School at Brooklands on 1 January 1914. On 27 January he was posted to HMS Pembroke, the shore establishment at Chatham, while attending a course of instruction at the Central Flying School, as a probationary sub-lieutenant in the Royal Naval Reserve.

Soon after the outbreak of the Great War, he transferred to the Army, as he was commissioned as a temporary second lieutenant on the General List on 9 September 1914. At some point between then and late 1916 Saunders was seconded to the Royal Flying Corps, as on 14 January 1917 he gained his first aerial victory while serving in No. 47 Squadron in northern Greece. Flying a B.E.12 single-seat fighter he shared in the forcing down and capture of an Albatros Type C reconnaissance aircraft over Lahana with Second Lieutenant Gilbert Green. Further victories followed, and in mid-March he drove down a Friedrichshafen G over Karasoúli, and destroyed an Albatros C west of Dovista, and in June destroyed an Albatros D.III. On 4 June 1917, now a lieutenant, he was awarded the Military Cross "for distinguished service in the field". He then transferred to No. 17 Squadron to fly the S.E.5a single-seat fighter, where in January 1918 he captured a DFW C at Porna, and destroyed a Rumpler C north-north-east of Kajendra, then on the afternoon of 5 February he drove down an Albatros D.III at Vernak Farm, and sent a DFW C down in flames north-west of Topolčani.

In March 1918, now an acting-captain, he was awarded a Bar to his Military Cross, which was gazetted on 23 August. His citation read:

Temporary Captain Franklin Geoffrey Saunders, MC, Royal Flying Corps.

"For conspicuous gallantry and devotion to duty. On three separate occasions during a month he has fought a hostile machine, pursued it over the enemy's lines and driven it down to earth, where it was completely wrecked. He has shown the most consistent gallantry and skill in action."

Saunders was transferred to the unemployed list after the war, but was restored to the active list with the rank of flight lieutenant for temporary duty between 12 April and 4 June 1921.
