= Patricroft =

Suburb in Greater Manchester, England

Coordinates: 53.480°N 2.351°W

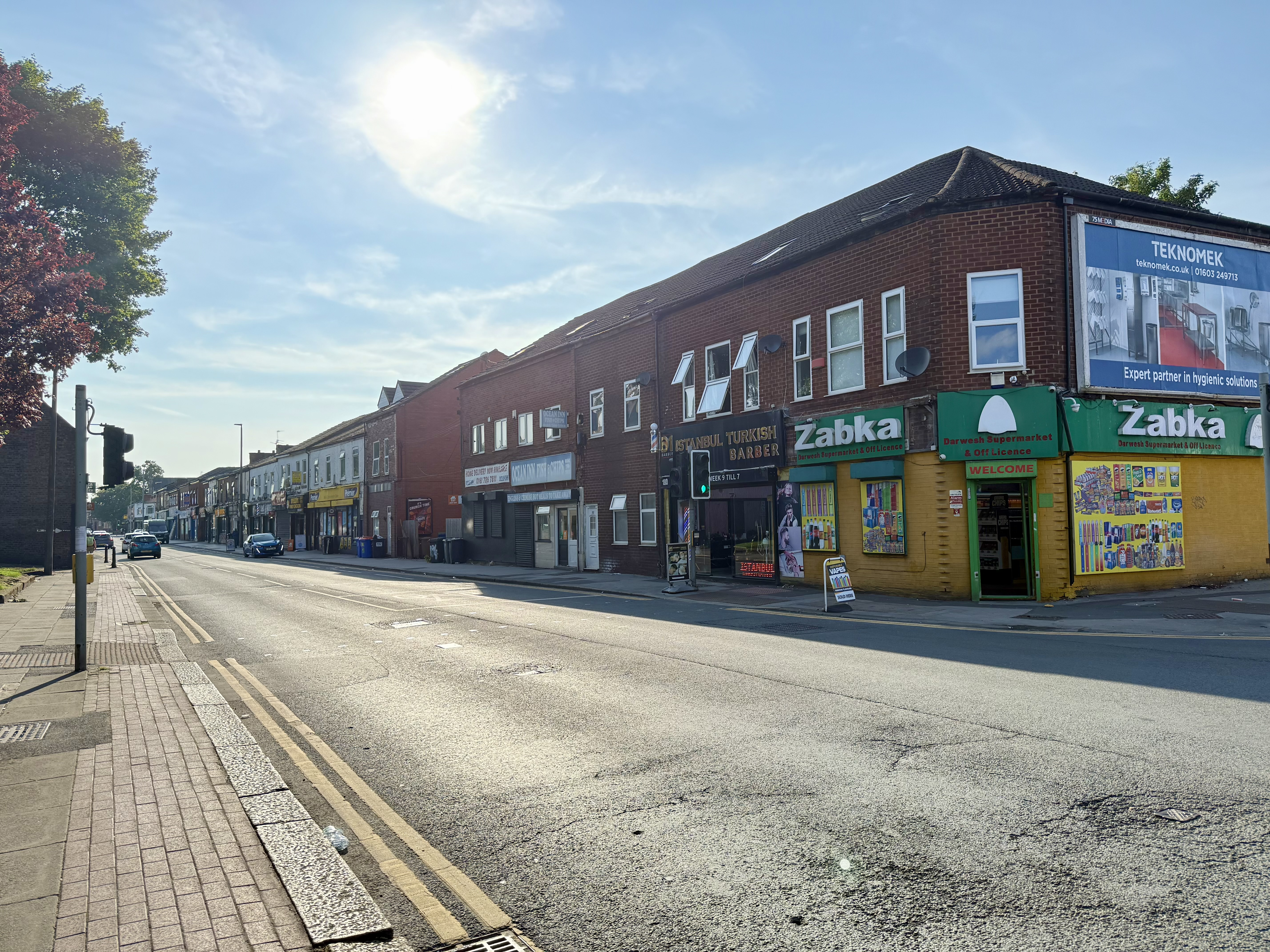
- Liverpool Road in Patricroft showing several shops in June 2025

- Location within Greater Manchester
- OS grid reference: SJ767982
- Metropolitan borough: Salford
- Metropolitan county: Greater Manchester
- Region: North West
- Country: England
- Sovereign state: United Kingdom
- Post town: MANCHESTER
- Postcode district: M30
- Dialling code: 0161
- Police: Greater Manchester
- Fire: Greater Manchester
- Ambulance: North West
- UK Parliament: Worsley and Eccles South and Salford and Eccles

Patricroft is a suburb near Eccles, a market town in the City of Salford, Greater Manchester, England.

== History ==
Patricroft may derive its name from 'Pear-tree croft', or more likely, 'Patrick's Croft'.

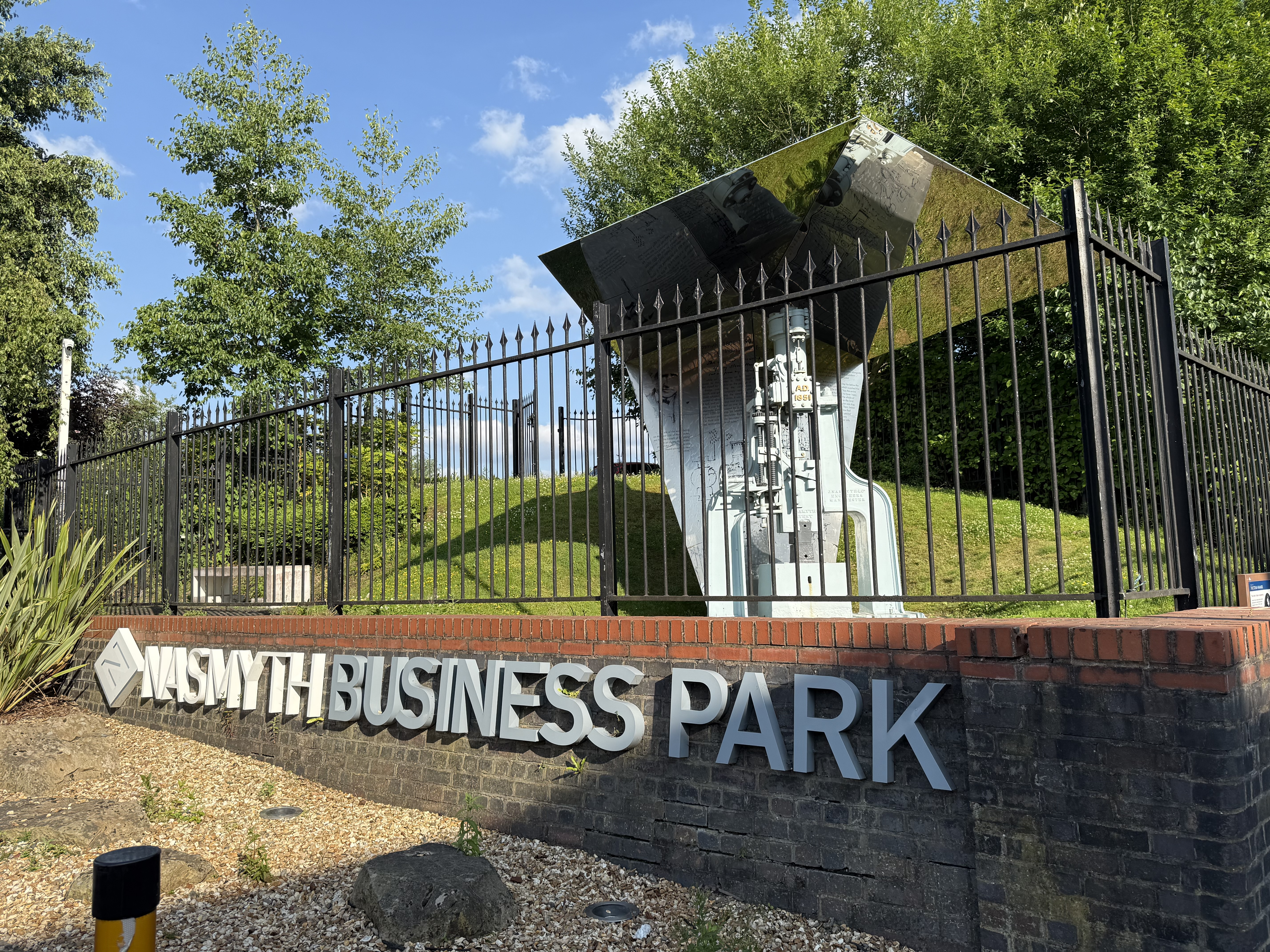
The original steam hammer from the Bridgewater Foundry is displayed at the entrance to the Nasmyth Business Park in Patricroft, which is named after James Nasmyth

In 1836 Scottish engineer James Nasmyth, in partnership with Holbrook Gaskell, built the Bridgewater Foundry in Patricroft. Nasmyth chose Patricroft, located on the west side of Manchester, 'because of the benefit of breathing pure air, realising that a healthy workforce is a more efficient workforce'. He named the works "Bridgewater Foundry" in memory of Canal Duke, the first canal maker in Britain. Bridgewater Foundry was located adjacent to the Bridgewater Canal and the Manchester to Liverpool railway line. The foundry soon expanded to become a major supplier of steam locomotives. During the First World War, the factory's production was mainly diverted to munitions work. At the start of the Second World War it became a Royal Ordnance Factory, producing shells, tanks and guns. The engineering works closed in 1989; the site is now part of a business and technology centre.

The area was part of the municipal borough of Eccles in Lancashire until 1974 when it was incorporated into Salford, Greater Manchester.

== Churches ==
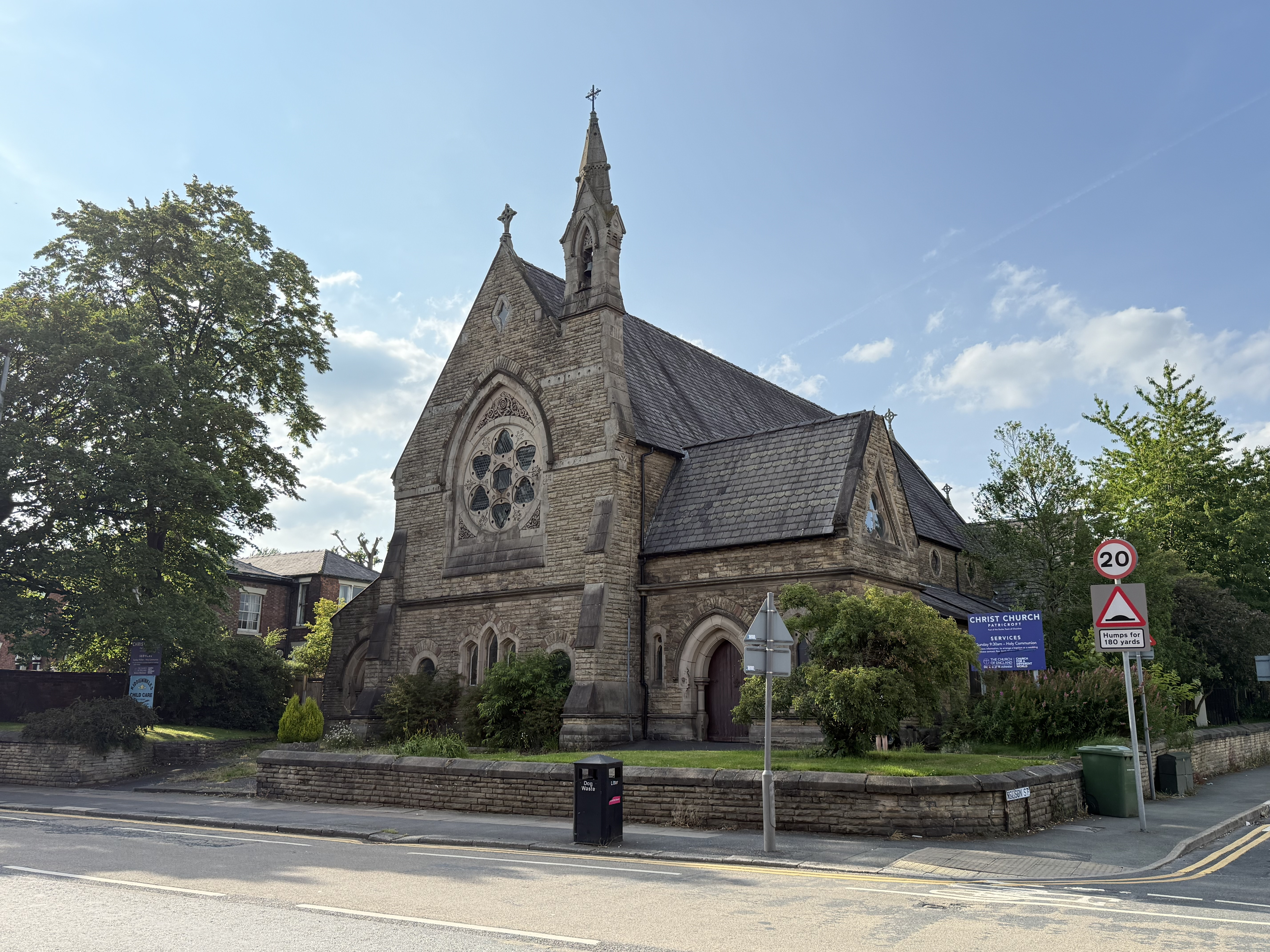
Christ Church on Liverpool Road (June 2025)

=== Christ Church ===
Christ Church on Liverpool Road is the Anglican parish church of Patricroft. Construction was begun by the Rev. Samuel Dale, curate at Eccles and later the first vicar at Patricroft. The church was designed by John Lowe and built to seat 750 worshippers; it opened around 1868.

=== Holy Cross ===
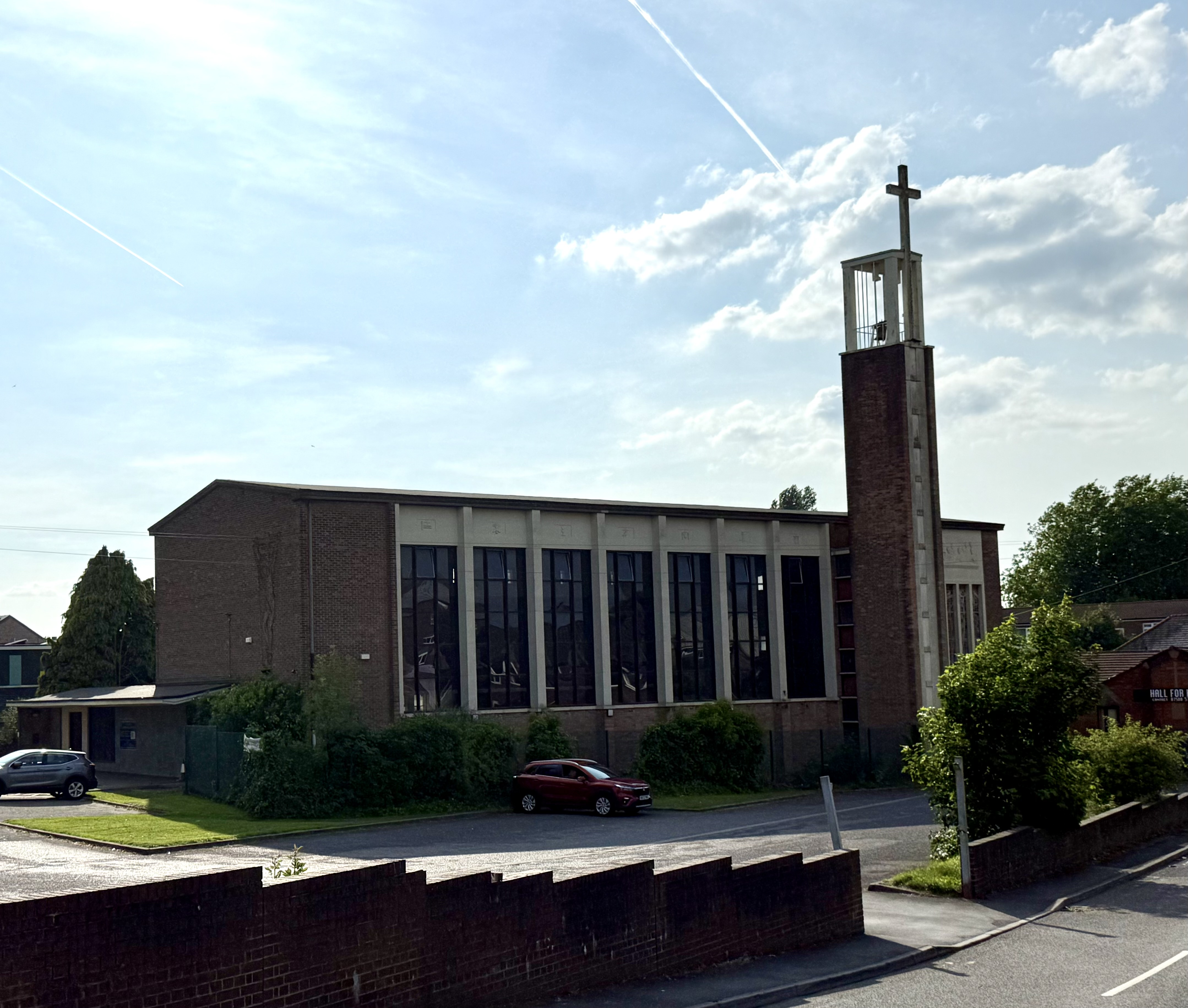
Holy Cross Church on Liverpool Road (June 2025)

The Church of the Holy Cross at Patricroft Bridge is the Roman Catholic parish church of Patricroft. It opened in 1961.

=== Patricroft Methodist Church ===
Patricroft Methodist Church (technically located in Peel Green) stands on the corner of Alexandra Road and Liverpool Road. It was formed in 1964 through the merger of Trinity Methodist Church and the Ebenezer Methodist Church. A new church building was opened on the Trinity site in February 1972. The congregations of Barton Methodist Church and Winton Methodist Churches later joined them.

=== United Reformed Church ===
The United Reformed Church have a church on Shakespeare Crescent and their North Western Synod on Franklin Street.

== Transport ==
The district is served by Patricroft railway station, which was opened on 15 September 1830 by the Liverpool & Manchester Railway and is situated on Green Lane. A large steam-locomotive running shed stood immediately north of the line until its closure in 1968.

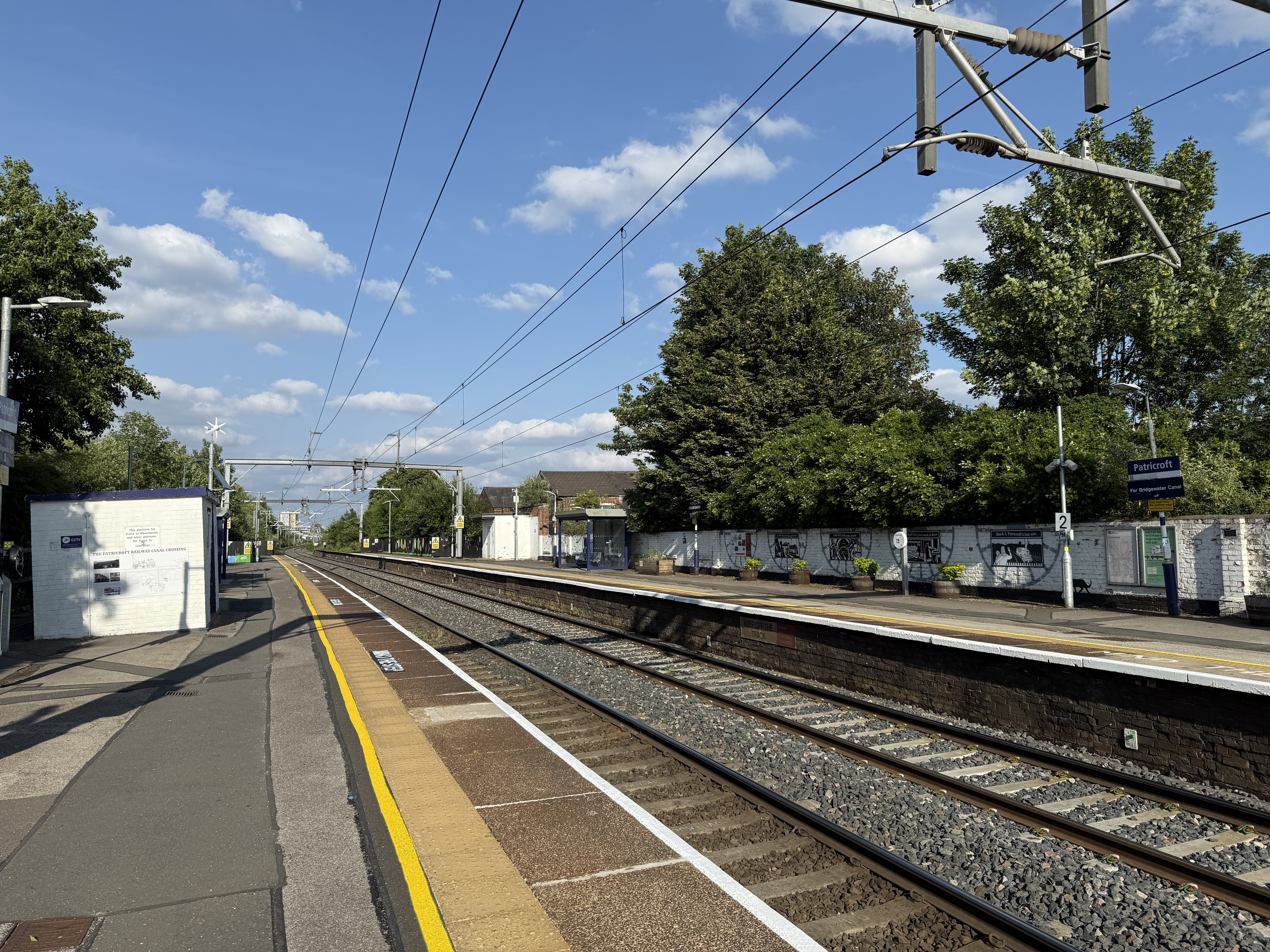
Patricroft railway station (June 2025)

Bus services in the area are provided by Arriva North West, Diamond Bus North West and Go North West. Routes are co-ordinated by Transport for Greater Manchester.

== Notable people ==
Sir Edwin Alliott Verdon Roe was born in Patricroft in 1877. He was the first Englishman to make a powered flight, achieving this in 1908 at Brooklands, and to fly an all-British aircraft a year later on Hackney Marshes. He founded the Avro company, one of the world's earliest aircraft manufacturers, in 1910. His brother, Humphrey Verdon Roe, was co-founder of Avro and later co-founded Britain's first birth-control clinic with Marie Stopes. Frederick Powell, a First World War flying ace, also was born in Patricroft. The campaigning journalist and editor Harold Evans was born there in 1928.
