= Frodsham School =

Coordinates: 53.294°N 2.726°W

Frodsham College (School)
- Frodsham, Cheshire; England

Information
- Type: Comprehensive secondary
- Closed: 2009
- Local authority: Cheshire West and Chester
- Specialist: Science College; Technology College
- Head teacher: Mrs A Cooper (acting)
- Gender: Co-educational
- Age: 11 to 18

Frodsham School was a designated specialist science and technology college in the town of Frodsham, Cheshire, England. The school closed in the summer of 2009 due to declining enrollment because of lower birth rates in recent years; most of the school's intake came from the nearby Runcorn area, and there is another local high school, Helsby High School.

The school was a 12–18 co-educational Comprehensive school governed by Cheshire LEA, offering single sex and co-education with mixed age tutor groups. In its final year, the school no longer had a year seven, as the closure programme meant that no admissions at age 11 were considered in 2007.

== Exam results 2006-07 ==
In 2006, the pupils at the school broke school result records and improved in 2007, with 86% of pupils achieving 5 GCSEs at grades A* - C. The government target of 70% was beaten, and the target set by the school for its pupils was exceeded by 6%.

== Single sex teaching ==
Under the influence of its headteacher, Frodsham School had single-sex teaching for its lower school (years 7-9). Due to falling class sizes, this scheme was phased out, and the majority of lessons for all years were mixed gender.

== Ofsted ==
The Office for Standards in Education, Children's Services and Skills (Ofsted) audited the Frodsham School in the autumn term of 2006 over three days. It achieved an overall rating of level 2 (or "Good") in the Ofsted scale, while earning Outstanding marks in the categories of "How well learners enjoy their education" and "The extent to which learners make a positive contribution to the community."

== Closure ==
As part of a nationwide initiative, it was announced in the 2005-06 school year that Frodsham School was to close at the end of the 2007 school year. Further consultations set this date back to 2009. As of 2007, was no new intake, meaning the school no longer had a year 7.

Frodsham School closed due to falling birth rates; there are no longer enough children of school age to justify two schools so close together. Helsby High School has been extended to allow Frodsham pupils to move, and Frodsham has now closed.

== Notable alumni ==
- Gary Barlow, singer and songwriter
- Zak Whitbread, professional footballer
- Emma Cunniffe, actress
