= Frederick Powell =

British flying ace (1895–1992)

- Born: 13 August 1895; Patricroft, Manchester, Lancashire, England
- Died: May 1992 (aged 96–97); Cambridge, Cambridgeshire, England
- Military career
- Allegiance: United Kingdom
- Branch: British Army; Royal Air Force
- Service years: 1913–1927; 1939–1945
- Rank: Wing Commander
- Units: Duke of Lancaster's Own Yeomanry; Manchester Regiment; No. 5 Squadron RFC; No. 40 Squadron RFC; No. 28 Squadron RAF
- Commands: No. 43 Training Squadron RFC; No. 41 Squadron RFC
- Conflicts: First World War: Western Front; Second World War
- Awards: Officer of the Order of the British Empire; Military Cross

Frederick James Powell, OBE, MC (13 August 1895 – May 1992) was a British flying ace of the First World War, credited with six confirmed and nine unconfirmed aerial victories. He remained in the Royal Air Force post-war, serving until 1927, then returned to military service during the Second World War.

== Early life ==
Powell was born in Patricroft, Manchester, in 1895, but by 1901 was living in Great Crosby, Lancashire. His 1915 Aviators' Certificate lists his address as The Vicarage, South Shore, Blackpool.

== First World War ==
Powell began his military service in August 1913, when he joined the Duke of Lancaster's Own Yeomanry, a unit of the Territorial Force. On 21 September 1914, soon after the outbreak of the war, he transferred to the 18th (Service) Battalion (3rd City) of the Manchester Regiment, part of the New Army, as a second lieutenant. He then promptly volunteered for service in the Royal Flying Corps, and was transferred in November.

Powell trained as a pilot at Farnborough, and was promoted to lieutenant on 2 February 1915. He was granted Royal Aero Club Aviators' Certificate No. 1130 on 2 March, after soloing a Maurice Farman biplane, and then completed his training at Netheravon. Powell was appointed a flying officer on 25 May, and transferred to the General List.

Powell was posted to No. 5 Squadron, based at Abele, Belgium, serving in "B" Flight. He staked his first two claims for aerial victories on 19 September 1915 while flying a Vickers Gunbus, one claim being confirmed. He had a string of four unconfirmed claims during October and November, and on 15 December he was appointed a flight commander with the temporary rank of captain. He gained his second confirmed victory on 19 December. He had one more unconfirmed claim while flying the Gunbus, on 2 January 1916, and was awarded the Military Cross, on 14 January. As the commander of "B" Flight, he then flew the first FE.8 to go into action in France, No. 7457. He was rather proprietorial about it, supposedly refusing leave to monopolize flying it on a daily basis. He scored his first win with the new aircraft on 17 January 1916; by 12 March, he had three unconfirmed wins, and three more triumphs credited to him, including one with Gilbert W. M. Green serving as his gunner/observer.

Powell returned to England in April 1916, and was based at Cambridge, but in May returned to France when posted to No. 40 Squadron as a flight commander. The squadron was the first unit to be equipped with the FE.8. In February 1917 Powell was appointed chief fighting instructor in the RFC's Northern Group, based at York, and from April he commanded No. 43 Training Squadron at Ternhill, being appointed squadron commander with the temporary rank of major on 16 May 1917.

Powell returned to France on 2 August 1917 when appointed commander of No. 41 Squadron. On 2 February 1918, during an offensive patrol over the Douai sector, Powell was wounded and his engine disabled during a dogfight with Max Kühn of Jasta 10. He made a forced landing on a German airfield, and was captured, spending the remainder of the war as a POW. He was repatriated after the Armistice, and eventually left the RAF on 17 May 1919.

== Inter-war service ==
On 12 December 1919 Powell was granted a short service commission in the RAF, with the rank of flight lieutenant, but this was cancelled a week later. However, he was granted a short service commission as a flight lieutenant again, on 5 June 1920. After serving at the Boys' Wing at RAF Cranwell, he was posted to No. 28 Squadron in India on 17 September 1921. He returned to the RAF Depot as a supernumerary officer on 31 November 1922, and served under the Superintendent of Reserve at RAF Northolt from 9 July 1925. On 5 June 1927 Powell was transferred to the RAF Reserve as a "Class A" officer, finally relinquishing his commission after completing his period of service on 5 June 1931.

== Second World War ==
On 19 September 1939, soon after the outbreak of the Second World War, Powell was granted a commission "for the duration of hostilities" as a pilot officer on probation in the Administrative and Special Duties Branch of the Royal Air Force Volunteer Reserve. He was promoted to the war substantive rank of flying officer on 6 February 1940, and from flight lieutenant to temporary squadron leader on 1 June 1942, which was made war substantive on 2 December 1942. Shortly afterwards he was promoted to acting wing commander, and subsequently received three mentions in despatches, on 1 January 1943, 8 June 1944, and 1 January 1945. Finally, on 14 June 1945, in the King's Birthday Honours Powell was made an Officer of the Order of the British Empire.

In his later years, Powell lived in Dorset. He died in Cambridge in May 1992.

== Bibliography ==
- Guttman, Jon & Dempsey, Harry (2009). Pusher Aces of World War I. Oxford, UK: Osprey Publishing. ISBN 978-1-84603-417-6.
- Shores, Christopher F.; Franks, Norman & Guest, Russell F. (2002). Above the Trenches Supplement: a Complete Record of the Fighter Aces and Units of the British Empire Air Forces 1915–1920. London, UK: Grub Street. ISBN 978-1-898697-39-8.
