= Gilbert W. M. Green =

English Royal Air Force officer (1895–1958)

Gilbert Ware Murlis Green
- Born: 24 January 1895; London, England
- Died: 26 August 1958 (aged 63)
- Military career
- Allegiance: United Kingdom
- Branch: British Army; Royal Air Force
- Service years: 1914–1942
- Rank: Group Captain
- Units: No. 5 Squadron RFC; No. 17 Squadron RFC
- Commands: No. 44 Squadron RFC; No. 151 Squadron RAF; No. 70 Squadron RAF
- Awards: Distinguished Service Order & Bar; Military Cross & Two Bars; Mentioned in Despatches (3); Knight of the Legion of Honour (France); Croix de guerre (France); Croix de guerre (Belgium); Order of the White Eagle (Serbia)

Group Captain Gilbert Ware Murlis Green, DSO & Bar, MC & Two Bars (24 January 1895 – 26 August 1958) was a Royal Air Force career officer credited with eight aerial victories. He was a pioneer among fighter aces, and his victories were scored in a variety of theatres and flying environments. He was successful on both the Western Front, in Greece, and on his home soil. He also commanded two of the original night fighter squadrons.

== First World War ==
On 9 September 1914, just after the First World War broke out, Green was promoted from rifleman to temporary second lieutenant in the 16th (County of London) Battalion, The London Regiment (Queen's Westminster Rifles). By 22 November 1915, he was a flying officer observer. He was assigned to No. 5 Squadron on the Western Front. Manning the guns in a two-seater aircraft piloted by Frederick Powell, Green brought down a DFW two-seater on 29 February 1916. He was then transferred from Flying Officer Observer to the Royal Flying Corps's General List on 19 June 1916 and sent for pilot training. On 13 December 1916 he scored his second victory, destroying another DFW while flying a Royal Aircraft Factory B.E.12 with 17 Squadron in Salonika, Greece.

On 4 January 1917, Green captured an Albatros D.V fighter despite being overmatched; the German craft was faster, more agile, and had two guns instead of one. Ten days later, he would repeat the feat, although his victim this time was an Albatros two-seater reconnaissance plane, and Green had help from fellow ace Franklin Saunders. On 18 February 1917, Green battled German ace Rudolf von Eschwege in a dogfight during which Green's gun jammed, and wingman J. C. F. Owen was shot down. Green returned to form on 18 and 19 March, destroying a Friedrichshafen G seaplane and driving another down out of control on the 18th, and setting fire to an Albatros reconnaissance aircraft on the 19th. Green thus became the only pilot to become an ace flying the B.E. 12. These three successes earned him the Distinguished Service Order.

For his next victory, Green borrowed a Spad fighter; he brought down an Albatros two-seater in flames with it on 13 July 1917. He was then rotated home to England to command a Home Defence unit, 44 Squadron, which operated Sopwith Camels as night fighters. Here Green ended the year by shooting down a Gotha G.IV bomber piloted by German Oberleutnant Gerhard Von Stachelsky on 18 December 1917. It was the first German aeroplane to be shot down at night over Britain.

In June 1918, Green took command of 151 Squadron and led it to France, where it engaged the Germans in night fighter operations. Later in the war, he moved on to command 70 Squadron in daylight combat.

== Postwar career ==
Green continued serving in the Royal Air Force after the war. On 1 July 1928, he was promoted from squadron leader to wing commander. On 1 July 1934, he was promoted again, from wing commander to group captain. He was retired from the RAF at his own request on 24 March 1942.

== Honours and awards ==
Distinguished Service Order
Temporary Second Lieutenant (Temporary Captain) Gilbert Ware M. Green, MC, RFC.

For conspicuous gallantry and devotion to duty. He has set a magnificent example by his gallant conduct in attacking the enemy's aeroplanes when in superior numbers. He brought down three enemy machines within twenty-four hours.

Bar to the Distinguished Service Order
Temporary Captain Gilbert Ware Murles Green, DSO, MC., General List, Royal Flying Corps.

In recognition of gallantry and distinguished service in connection with Anti-Aircraft services in the United Kingdom.

Military Cross
Temporary Second Lieutenant (Temporary Lieutenant) Gilbert Ware M. Green, RFC.

Awarded, 1 January 1917.

First bar to Military Cross
Second Lieutenant (Temporary Lieutenant) Gilbert Ware Murlis Green, MC, General List and RFC.

For conspicuous gallantry in action. He brought down two enemy machines on successive days under adverse circumstances. He has displayed great dash and courage at every opportunity.

Second bar to Military Cross
Temporary Second Lieutenant (Temporary Captain) Gilbert Ware Murlis Green, DSO, MC., General List and RFC.

While flying at night on patrol duty he encountered an enemy aeroplane, which he attacked with great determination and skill, and although there was very little light he succeeded in hitting one of the engines of the machine, which, by reason of the damage, was forced to come down in the sea off a South Coast port, where two of the occupants of the machine ware made prisoners.

- Mentioned in Despatches: 6 December 1916, 28 November 1917 and 20 December 1917.
- French Croix de Guerre, awarded 2 June 1917.
- Serbian Order of the White Eagle 4th Class, with Swords, awarded 3 October 1917.
- Croix de Chevalier of the Légion d'honneur, awarded 21 September 1918.
- Belgian Croix de Guerre, awarded 15 July 1919.

== Bibliography ==
- Addington, Scott (2006). For Conspicuous Gallantry: Winners of the Military Cross and Bar During the Great War. Troubador Publishing Ltd. ISBN 9781905237432.
- Shores, Christopher; Rolfe, Mark (2001). British and Empire Aces of World War I. Osprey Publishing. ISBN 978-1-84176-377-4.
