= Gaskill =

Gaskill may refer to:

== Places ==
- Gaskill, Kentucky
- Gaskill Township, Jefferson County, Pennsylvania

== People with the surname ==
- Brian Gaskill (born 1970), American actor
- E. Thurman Gaskill (1935–2023), American politician from Iowa
- Gudy Gaskill (1927–2016), American mountaineer, driving force behind creation of the Colorado Trail
- James Gaskill (1800–1870), English cotton spinner, Bible Christian minister, and activist
- Jerry Gaskill (born 1957), American rock musician
- Joseph H. Gaskill, (1851–1935) American judge from New Jersey
- Malcolm Gaskill (born 1967), English historian and author
- Mary Gaskill (born 1941), American politician from Iowa
- Mike Gaskill (fl. 2010s–2020s), American politician from Indiana
- Nelson B. Gaskill (1875–1964), chair of the Federal Trade Commission
- William Gaskill (1930–2016), British theatre director

== See also ==
- Gaskell
