= Benny Jones =

English footballer

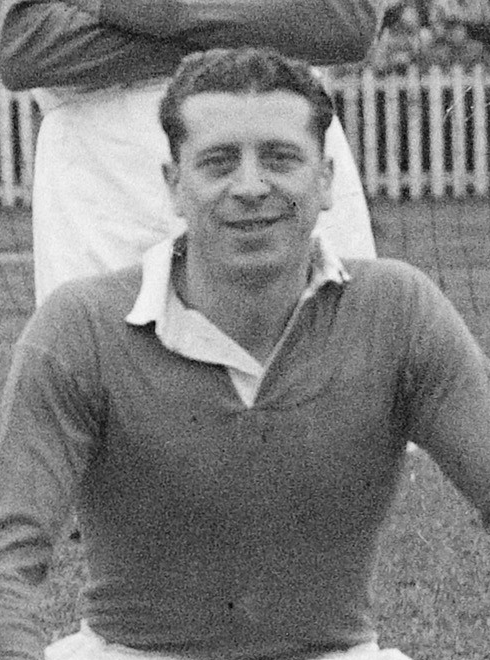
- Jones in a Chelsea team photo, November 1947

Personal information
- Full name: Thomas Benjamin Jones
- Date of birth: 23 March 1920
- Place of birth: Frodsham, England
- Date of death: 1972 (aged 51–52)
- Position: Outside left

Senior career*
Years	Team	Apps	(Gls)
	Ellesmere Port Town	?	(?)
1946–1947	Tranmere Rovers	54	(19)
1947–1953	Chelsea	55	(11)
1953–1954	Accrington Stanley	22	(0)
1954–1955	Dartford	3	(0)
Total		126	(30)
- * Club domestic league appearances and goals

Thomas Benjamin Jones (23 March 1920 – 1972) was an English professional footballer who played as a winger for Tranmere Rovers, Chelsea and Accrington Stanley in the Football League. He was born in Frodsham, Cheshire.
