= The Ruined Maid =

Poem by Thomas Hardy

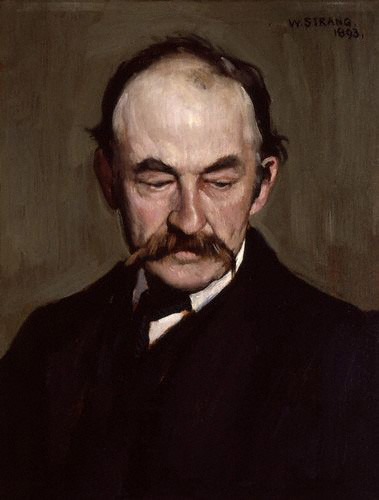
Portrait of Hardy by William Strang, 1893

"The Ruined Maid" is a satirical poem by Thomas Hardy. It was written in 1866 but first published, in a slightly bowdlerized form, in Poems of the Past and the Present (1901).

== Overview ==
Thomas Hardy's "The Ruined Maid" is a poem about a woman who loses her purity or virginity during the Victorian Era, which is looked down upon. This poem displays how the ruined maid sees herself, but also how society sees her. Though the poem takes on real issues of culture during the Victorian Era, Hardy intended this poem to be light-hearted.

The poem is presented a conversation between two people. To depict this, Hardy uses two voices: For the ruined maid he uses proper English, and for the other person he uses a working-class dialect. The poem features a couplet rhyme scheme which can often be found in satirical poetry. This form is also known as an "aabb" rhyme scheme because every two lines rhyme in each stanza.

== Text ==
"O 'Melia, my dear, this does everything crown!
Who could have supposed I should meet you in Town?
And whence such fair garments, such prosperi-ty?" —
"O didn't you know I'd been ruined?" said she.

— "You left us in tatters, without shoes or socks,
Tired of digging potatoes, and spudding up docks;
And now you've gay bracelets and bright feathers three!" —
"Yes: that's how we dress when we're ruined," said she.

— "At home in the barton you said thee' and thou,'
And thik oon,' and theäs oon,' and t'other'; but now
Your talking quite fits 'ee for high compa-ny!" —
"Some polish is gained with one's ruin," said she.

— "Your hands were like paws then, your face blue and bleak
But now I'm bewitched by your delicate cheek,
And your little gloves fit as on any la-dy!" —
"We never do work when we're ruined," said she.

— "You used to call home-life a hag-ridden dream,
And you'd sigh, and you'd sock; but at present you seem
To know not of megrims or melancho-ly!" —
"True. One's pretty lively when ruined," said she.

— "I wish I had feathers, a fine sweeping gown,
And a delicate face, and could strut about Town!" —
"My dear — a raw country girl, such as you be,
Cannot quite expect that. You ain't ruined," said she.

== Analysis ==
The poem depicts a young country girl who has become a rich man's mistress to escape her own poverty, and does not seem to regret her decision. Her position is contrasted with that of her old friend who is still a respectable but poor country farm worker, and who seems to envy Amelia. The poem offers an ironic comment on the lives of working class women. Hardy implies the only way a woman can obtain independence in this society is by selling herself. The ruined maid acts as an archetype and also an image that relates to social realities which are important during the Victorian Era. Because Amelia is a prostitute and therefore she must be 'ruined', most women should not envy her lifestyle. But in Hardy's satirical poem, it seems obvious that the unnamed speaker is envious of Amelia because of the beautiful clothes Amelia is wearing.

This poem also discusses the concept of money. During this time in history, those who had wealth were considered important in society. Amelia has money but she knows that she had to sacrifice much in order to get the money.

Since "The Ruined Maid" is about two women reuniting after a long time in a strange part of town, their dialogue includes discussion of the past in order for the reader to understand the present. This poem has a parallel in which the first part of the stanza discusses Amelia's past while the second part of the stanza discusses her present. Hardy uses imagery to help the reader read between the lines. The unknown speaker in the poem illustrates how Amelia's life is before by reminding her of how things had looked so long ago, and the reader can understand how things are now because of the imagery of the jewels and fine clothing.

Hardy uses every word in his poems with meaning; each has a set purpose to enhance the reader's understanding of the poem. Though each word illustrates a specific emotion to show the reader how each speaker is feeling, that emotion is not necessarily specifically named. The title itself has meaning; Hardy uses the word "ruin", "ruin" has an "oo" sound which is a low frequency that imitates the mood of gloom or destruction.

"The Ruined Maid" is a satire and full of intended irony. Nevertheless, some critics argue that the poem is more serious than one might think due to what was going on in Hardy's life at the time. He was young and did not have his life figured out quite yet, nor did he have much of a love life.

== Adaptations ==
An "opera skit" by Seymour Barab called The Ruined Maid, based on Hardy's poem, was premiered in 1981. The poem was set to music by Judith Lang Zaimont as one of her Two Songs for Soprano and Harp.
