= Gaitskell =

Gaitskell may refer to:

- Arthur Gaitskell (1900–1985), British colonial administrator
- Dora Gaitskell, Baroness Gaitskell (1901–1989), British politician
- Hugh Gaitskell (1906–1963), British politician; leader of the Labour party
- Mary Gaitskill (born 1954), American novelist, essayist, and short story writer
- Richard Gaitskell (born 1965), American physicist

== See also ==
- Gaskell
- Gaitskill
- Gaitskellism
