= The Darkling Thrush =

1900 poem by Thomas Hardy

- by Thomas Hardy
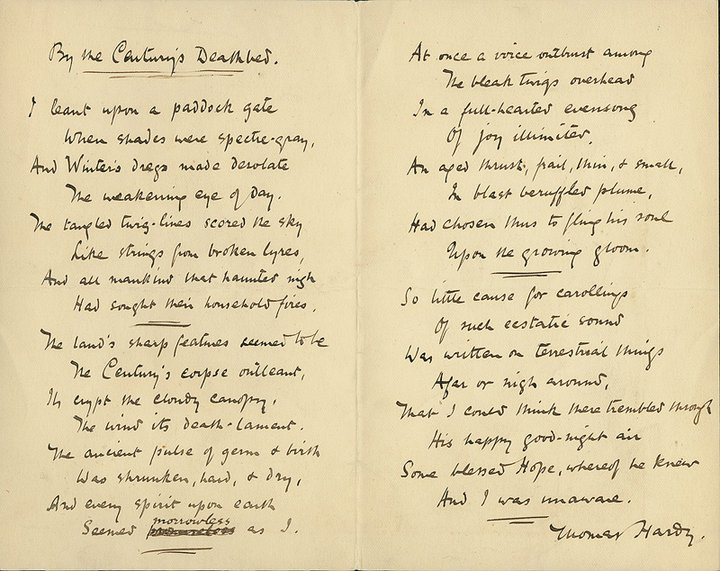
- Signed handwritten draft of "The Darkling Thrush" with original title
- Written: possibly 1899
- First published in: The Graphic
- Country: United Kingdom
- Language: English
- Publication date: 29 December 1900
- Lines: 32

Full text
- The Darkling Thrush at Wikisource

"The Darkling Thrush" is a poem by Thomas Hardy. Originally titled "By the Century's Deathbed", it was first published on 29 December 1900 in The Graphic. It then appeared in The Times on 1 January, 1901. A deleted '1899' on the poem's manuscript suggests that it may have been written in that year. It was later included in a collection entitled Poems of the Past and the Present (1901).

== Summary ==
The first two stanzas describe a bleak winter landscape at dusk, and the feeling of lifelessness that it produces. In stanza three, the melancholy atmosphere is transformed when "an aged thrush, frail, gaunt, and small" suddenly launches into "a full-hearted evensong of joy illimited." The final stanza muses that since there was no apparent cause for such an ecstatic outburst, the bird's singing must have been inspired by "some blessed Hope, whereof he knew and I was unaware."

== Sources and influences ==
The use of the word "darkling" recalls the same word in Matthew Arnold's Dover Beach (1867), a poem about loss of faith.

The poem appears to draw extensively on Henry Vaughan's 1655 poems On Death. A Dialogue and Departed Friends, which Hardy annotated in his copy of Vaughan's Silex Scintillans (entitled Sacred Poems and Pious Ejaculations in the 1897 edition Hardy owned). Other suggested influences include William Henry Hudson's Nature in Downland, John Keble, Percy Bysshe Shelley, William Wordsworth, John Keats, Herbert Spencer, Jane Eyre, Nathaniel Hawthorne's short story "Buds and Bird-Voices", George Frederic Watts's painting "Faith, Hope and Charity", and William Barnes's poem "A Winter Night".

== Influence ==
The literary scholar Al Benthall identified the influence of the poem on Siegfried Sassoon's poem "Thrushes", William Carlos Williams's "To a Wood Thrush", Robert Frost's "Come In", and T. S. Eliot's The Waste Land and Four Quartets. C. J. P. Beatty posited that the thrush mentioned in The Hobbit was also inspired by Hardy's poem.
