= Royal Aircraft Factory F.E.8 =

1915 British biplane pusher fighter aircraft

F.E.8
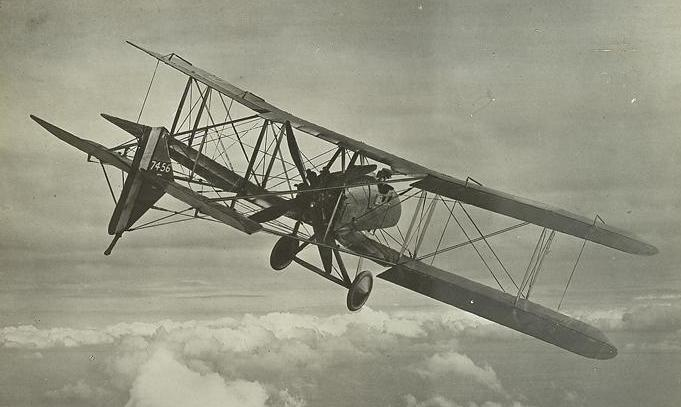

General information
- Type: Pusher biplane fighter
- Manufacturer: Royal Aircraft Factory, Darracq Motor Engineering, Vickers
- Status: retired
- Primary user: Royal Flying Corps
- Number built: 295

History
- Introduction date: 2 August 1916
- First flight: 15 October 1915

The Royal Aircraft Factory F.E.8 is a British single-seat fighter of the First World War designed at the Royal Aircraft Factory. It could not escape the drag penalty imposed by its tail structure and was no match for the Albatros fighters of late 1916.

== Design and development ==
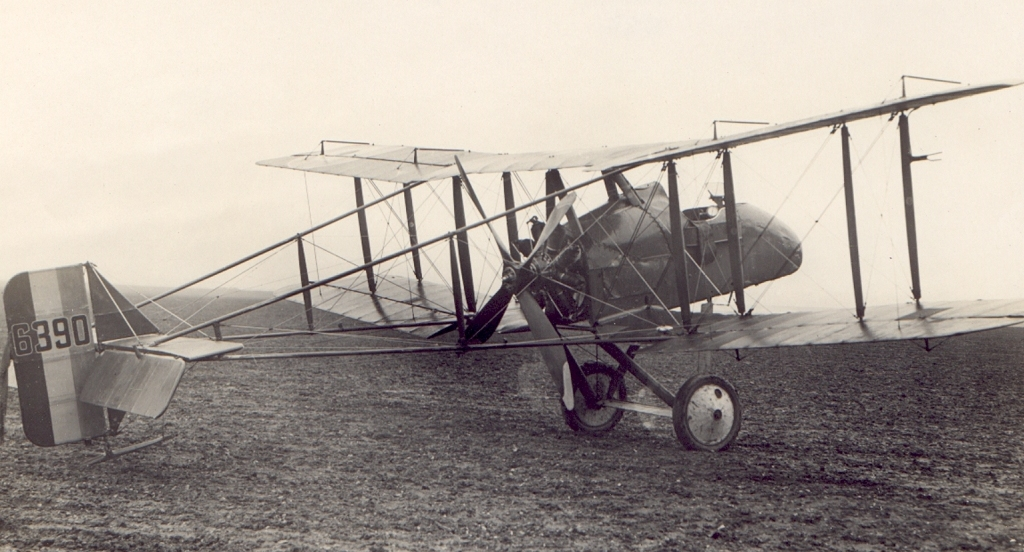
Royal Aircraft Factory F.E.8

The F.E.8 was an early British "scout" aircraft, designed from the outset as a single-seat fighter. In the absence of a synchronization gear to provide a forward firing machine gun for a tractor scout such as the S.E.2, it was given a pusher layout.

On the whole the new design, produced by a team led by John Kenworthy followed the conventional "Farman" layout, as did the competing Airco DH.2 designed by Geoffrey de Havilland, who had also previously worked at the Royal Aircraft Factory – but it had some novel features.

The nacelle was an all-metal structure – being framed in steel tube and covered with duralumin. The prototypes were fitted with large streamlined spinners on the propeller hub, although these were soon removed, and the production F.E.8s were built without them. The wings had a narrow chord, giving them a high aspect ratio. They featured dihedral outboard of the wide centre section, and the ailerons were of unusually long span – occupying the entire wing trailing edge outboard of the tail booms. The booms themselves were attached to the main spar of the tailplane, rather than the rudder post, giving them taper in side elevation rather than in plan, as was done with the DH.2. This allowed the fitting of a variable incidence tailplane, although this was not adjustable in flight, but only on the ground. A single 100 hp (75 kW) Gnome 9 "Type B2" Monosoupape rotary engine driving a four-bladed propeller powered the aircraft, with the capability of taking the lower-powered Le Rhône 9C 80 hp (60 kW) nine-cylinder rotary.

Its first flight was made on 15 October 1915 and the test pilot was satisfied with the aircraft's handling. The aircraft was then armed with a single Lewis gun, which was originally fitted on a movable mount within the nose of the nacelle, with the machine gun's breech almost at the pilot's feet. This proved awkward in practice, and in production machines the gun was mounted directly in front of the pilot, in the manner of the D.H.2. Other changes required before the aircraft entered production included extra fuel to counter criticism from the commander of the Royal Flying Corps in France, Hugh Trenchard, that the F.E.8's endurance was too short. The new fighter was not a great improvement on the D.H.2 – although a little faster it was rather less manoeuvrable. It was nonetheless ordered into production from Darracq Motor Engineering Company and Vickers. Neither manufacturer delivered their F.E.8s particularly quickly, so that the type only reached the front in any numbers six months after the D.H.2.

== Operational history ==
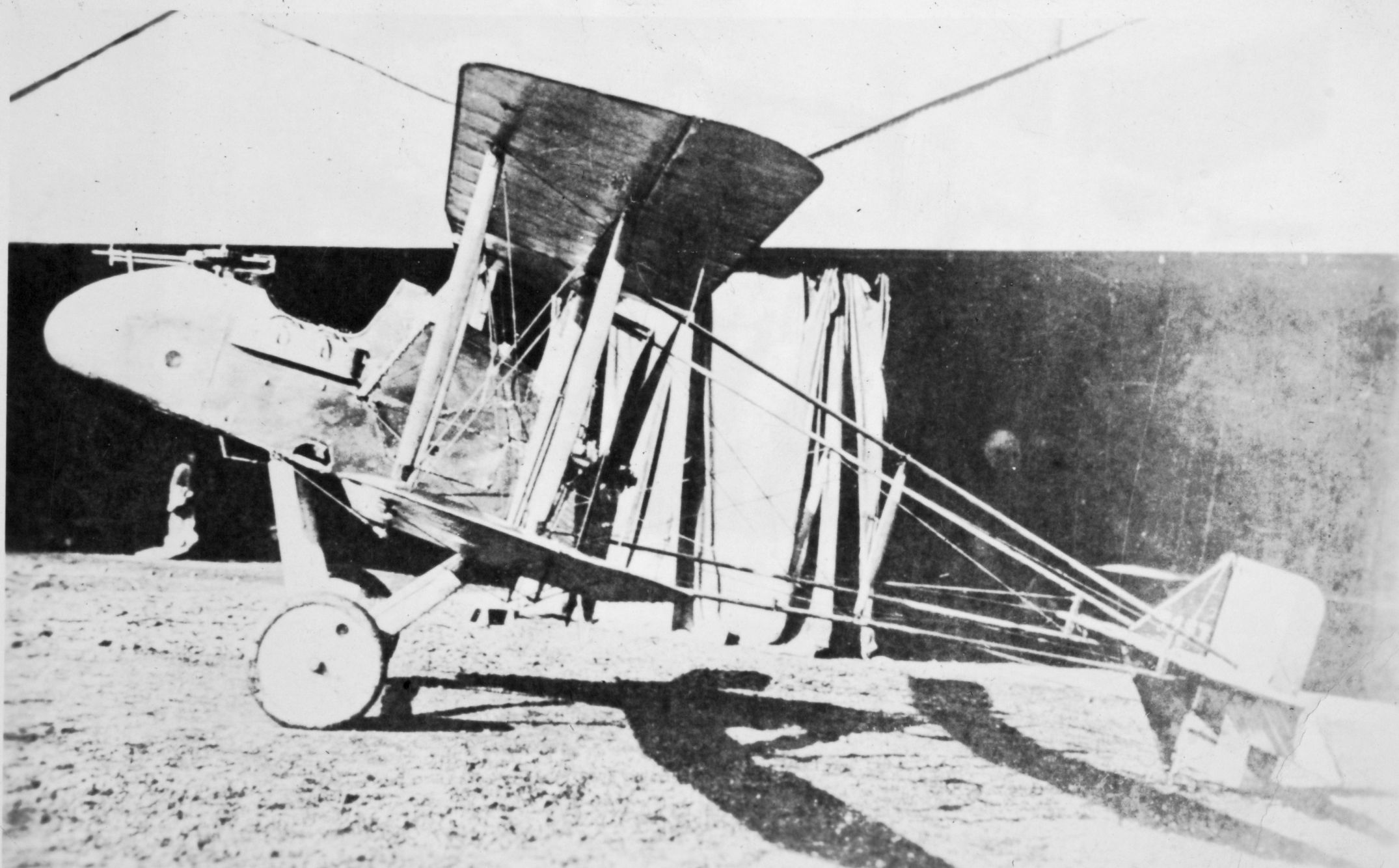
Royal Aircraft Factory F.E.8 in service

The second prototype had a spinner mounted when it was sent to No. 5 Squadron RFC at Abeele for evaluation on 26 December 1915, but had been removed by January 1916. It became the nearly exclusive mount of Captain Frederick Powell.

A few early production F.E.8s were briefly used by No. 29 Squadron RFC alongside its DH.2s in June 1916, but it was not until August that No. 40 Squadron became fully operational on the type. The only other unit to be completely equipped with the type, No. 41 Squadron, arrived in France in October.

After a fairly good start, the F.E.8 units quickly ran into problems with the new German fighters. The only ace on the type was Edwin Benbow who was credited with shooting down a German fighter on 6 March 1917, probably that of Manfred von Richthofen, who force landed with a holed fuel tank and narrowly escaping incineration.

Just three days later, on 9 March, 40 Squadron was again involved with Jagdstaffel 11, when nine F.E.8 were engaged by five Albatros D.IIIs led by Richthofen. Four F.E.8s were shot down, four others badly damaged, and the survivor caught fire when landing. After this disaster No. 40 Squadron was re-equipped with Nieuport 17s but No. 41 kept their pushers until July 1917 – becoming the last single-seat pusher fighter squadron in France, using them for ground attack duties during the Battle of Messines.

Two F.E.8s were sent to Home Defence units in 1917, but the type was not adopted as a home defence fighter.

== Reproductions ==
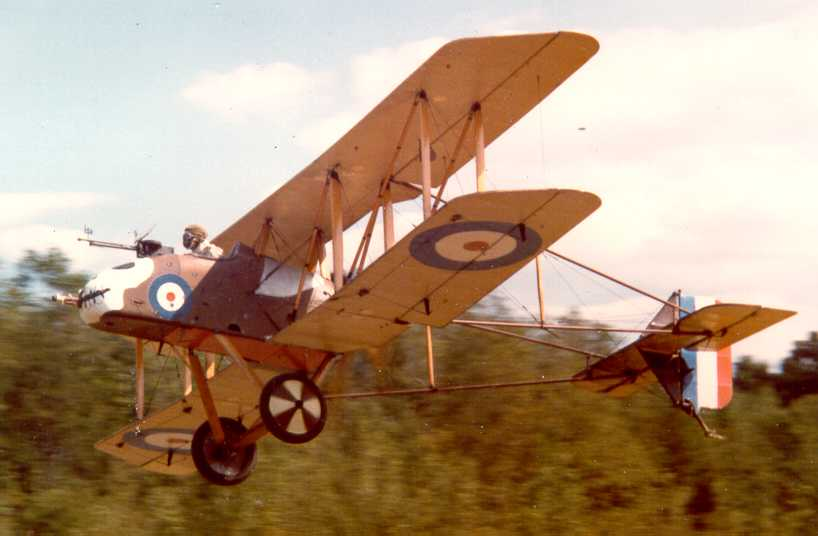
Cole Palen's F.E.8 reproduction in flight at Old Rhinebeck.

Old Rhinebeck Aerodrome's founder, Cole Palen, built the first known flyable reproduction of an F.E.8, which is believed to have first flown in 1970 at Old Rhinebeck with a Le Rhône 9C 80 hp rotary engine. It flew in the weekend air shows at Old Rhinebeck for a number of years, before being retired. It is currently on loan to the Smithsonian's National Air and Space Museum.

The Owls Head Transportation Museum in Maine has another F.E.8 reproduction in its collection, powered by a modern air-cooled, horizontally opposed engine. It was built in California, before being flown cross country and donated to the Museum upon arrival.

== Operators ==
United Kingdom

- Royal Flying Corps
  - No. 5 Squadron RFC
  - No. 29 Squadron RFC
  - No. 40 Squadron RFC
  - No. 41 Squadron RFC

== Specifications (F.E.8 (Gnome engine)) ==
RAF F.E.8 3-view drawing

Data from The Royal Aircraft Factory

General characteristics

- Crew: One
- Length: 23 ft 0 in (7.01 m)
- Wingspan: 31 ft 6 in (9.60 m)
- Height: 9 ft 2 in (2.79 m)
- Wing area: 214 sq ft (19.9 m^{2})
- Empty weight: 895 lb (406 kg)
- Gross weight: 1,346 lb (611 kg)
- Powerplant: 1 × Gnome Monosoupape 9 Type B-2 9-cylinder air-cooled rotary piston engine, 100 hp (75 kW)
- Propellers: 4-bladed fixed-pitch pusher propeller

Performance

- Maximum speed: 94 mph (151 km/h, 82 kn) at sea level
- Endurance: 2 hours 30 minutes
- Service ceiling: 14,500 ft (4,400 m)
- Time to altitude: 6,000 ft (1,800 m) in 9 minutes 30 seconds

Armament

- Guns: One 0.303 in (7.7 mm) Lewis gun
- Bombs: Light bombs

== See also ==
Aircraft of comparable role, configuration, and era

- Airco D.H.2

Related lists

- List of aircraft of the Royal Air Force
