= Frodsham =

Town and civil parish in Cheshire, England

Coordinates: 53.2947°N 2.7289°W

- Town and civil parish
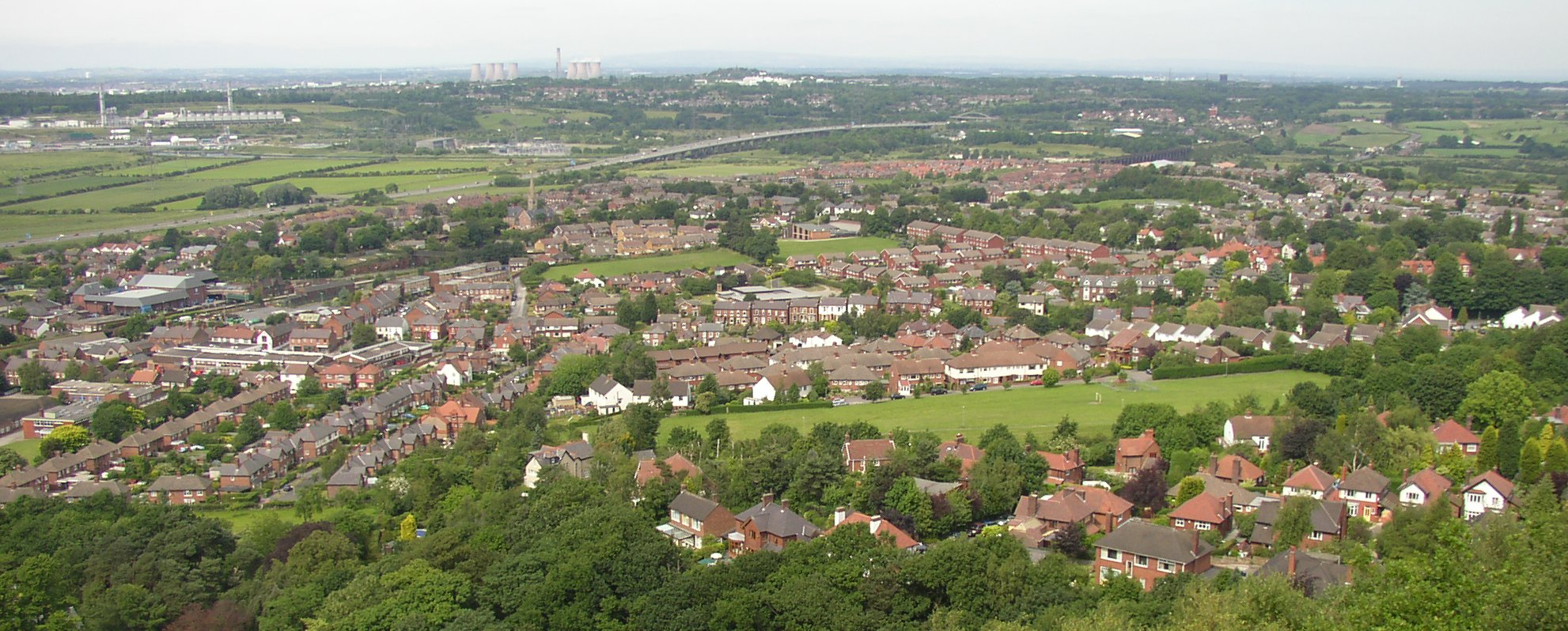
- Frodsham from Overton/Frodsham Hill

- Location within Cheshire
- Population: 9,300 (2021)
- GSS code: E04011099
- OS grid reference: SJ 5151 7776
- Civil parish: Frodsham
- Unitary authority: Cheshire West and Chester
- Ceremonial county: Cheshire
- Region: North West
- Country: England
- Sovereign state: United Kingdom
- Post town: FRODSHAM
- Postcode district: WA6
- Dialling code: 01928
- Police: Cheshire
- Fire: Cheshire
- Ambulance: North West
- UK Parliament: Runcorn and Helsby
- Website: frodsham.gov.uk

Frodsham /ˌfrɒdʃəm/ is a market town, civil parish, and electoral ward in the unitary authority of Cheshire West and Chester and the ceremonial county of Cheshire, England. Its population in 2021 was 9,300. It is 14 miles (23 km) south east of Liverpool and 28 miles (45 km) southwest of Manchester. The River Weaver runs to its northeast and on the west it overlooks the estuary of the River Mersey. The A56 road and the Chester–Manchester railway line pass through the town, and the M56 motorway passes to the northwest.

In the medieval era, Frodsham was an important borough and port belonging to the Earls of Chester. Its parish church, St. Laurence's, still exhibits evidence of a building present in the 12th century in its nave and is referenced in the Domesday Book. A market is held each Thursday, and Frodsham's viability as a trading centre was emphasised by the presence of the "big five" clearing banks and several building societies, though the branches of HSBC and NatWest have recently closed. Development in the town's shops and premises with alcohol licences is evident through the opening or modernisation of contemporary-style bar, restaurants, take-aways, and public houses since 2002, and in the continued presence of small, specialised, businesses operating from town-centre shops.

== History ==
=== Toponymy ===
The etymology of Frodsham's name is not entirely clear. It is called Frotesham in the Domesday Book. A literal translation of the Old English would give personal name of Frod or an old spelling of ford, and ham which means a village or homestead; hence Frod's village or the village on the ford (ford-ham). However, an alternative, more obscure etymology exists which suggests the name means "promontory into marsh", which would make sense considering that Frodsham had a promontory castle very close to marshland. Another possible etymology is Old English 'frōd' (“wise, prudent; experienced, old”) and 'Ham' ("homestead, settlement, or village"), with the 's' having been added through phonetic evolution or linguistic simplification over time, giving the meaning 'Wise Village'. Frodsham is unique as the name of a settlement in the British Isles. Earlier spellings of the name have included Fradsham, Frandsham, Frodisham, Ffradsam and Ffradsham.

=== Early history ===
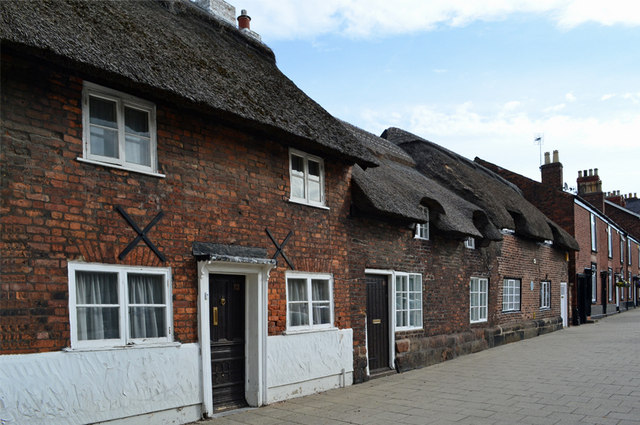
17th century cottages on Main Street

Frodsham Hill is the location of an Iron Age promontory fort, the outline of which can still be seen.

The town is of Saxon origin, and is mentioned in the Domesday Book. It was held by Hugh Lupus, Earl of Chester, and had 13 households and 9 ploughlands in 1086. It was valued at £4 in 1086, though the survey notes it was waste when acquired by Earl Hugh. Frodsham was an important manor of the medieval Earls of Chester and was created a borough in the early 13th century, probably by Earl Ranulf III. The mouth of the River Weaver, where it joins the Mersey, made Frodsham into a significant port for the coasting trade, particularly for the export of Cheshire salt, brought down the river from Northwich and Nantwich. The site of the manor house was in Castle Park; the building was of stone and was fortified. In an account of 1315 it is called 'castellum' (little castle), although 'manerium' (manor house) was the usual designation.

=== Recent history ===
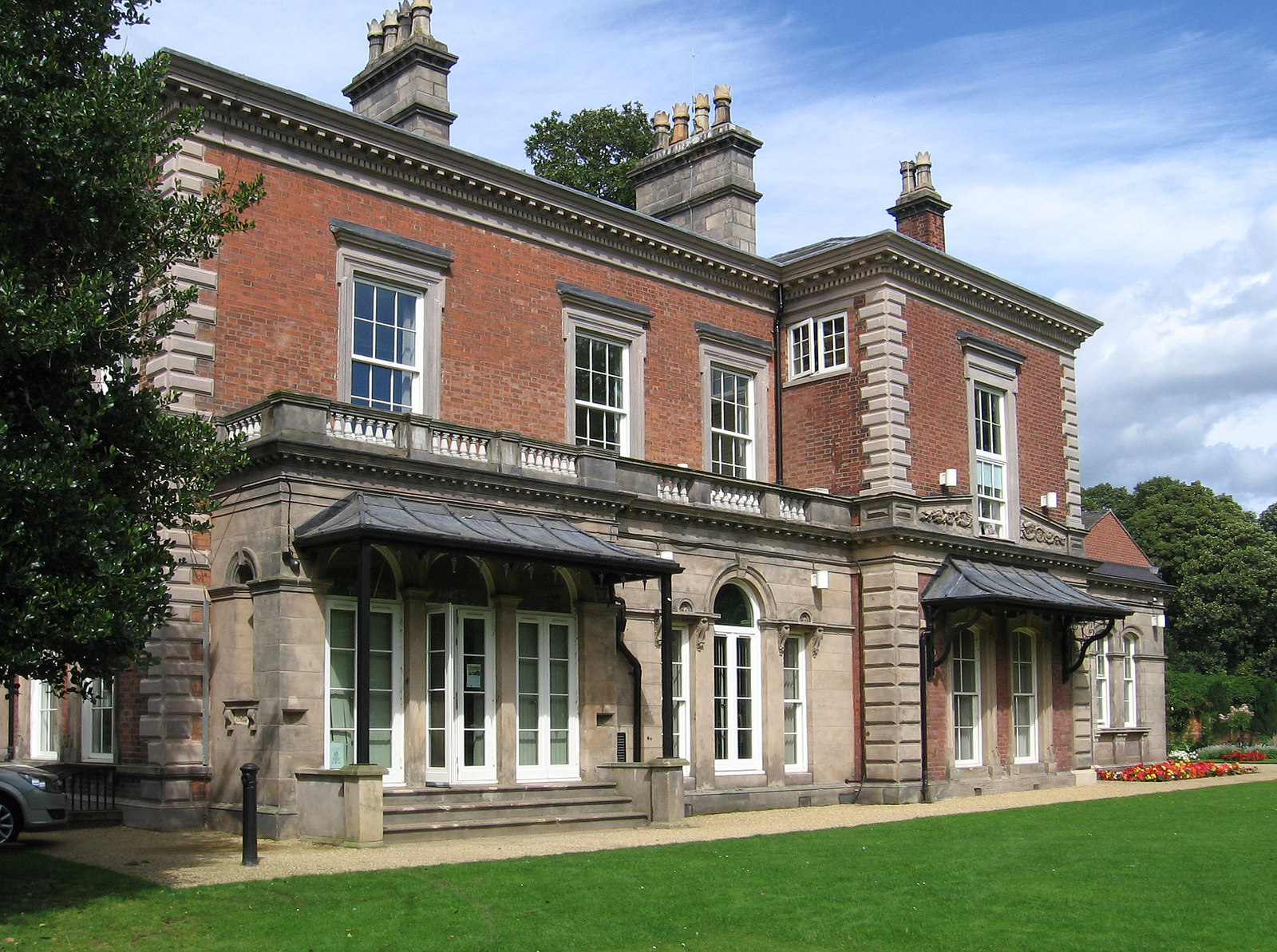
Castle Park House

Frodsham was the headquarters of Runcorn Rural District Council. In 1974 the district was split between Halton Borough Council, Warrington Borough Council and Vale Royal District Council (latterly Vale Royal Borough Council). In the early 1990s Vale Royal Borough Council opened a new purpose-built headquarters in Winsford. At the same time, its offices in Hartford near Northwich (the former headquarters of Northwich Rural District Council) and at Castle Park in Frodsham (the former headquarters of Runcorn Rural District Council) were downgraded.

Castle Park House had a major refurbishment in 2005–06 and now operates as a "one-stop shop" for Cheshire West and Chester Council, providing a number of services for the community and for businesses.

In 1992 the parish council became Frodsham Town Council and Frodsham was no longer a village. The chair of the parish council became the mayor of Frodsham. The majority of powers were held by Cheshire County Council and Vale Royal Borough Council who were replaced by Cheshire West and Chester Council on 1 April 2009.

Frodsham was home to Frodsham School, a science and technology college, which closed in July 2009 owing to the falling birth rate, and was amalgamated with Helsby High School. The site was redeveloped and now houses the new health centre for the town.

Frodsham, like the neighbouring village of Helsby, has a hill overlooking the Mersey estuary, which is popular with dog walkers and naturalists. Frodsham Hill, overlooking Frodsham and the Liverpool skyline, is a large sandstone hill, home to many farms, prestige homes and the Mersey View nightclub (commonly known as 'the View') and Forest Hills Hotel. Before the construction of the hotel and nightclub, famously hosting one of the Beatles' first appearances, the site was home to a very large helter skelter and a fine collection of vintage coin-operated amusement machines.

The Frodsham Caves are found in the sandstone foundations of Frodsham Hill.

== Geography ==
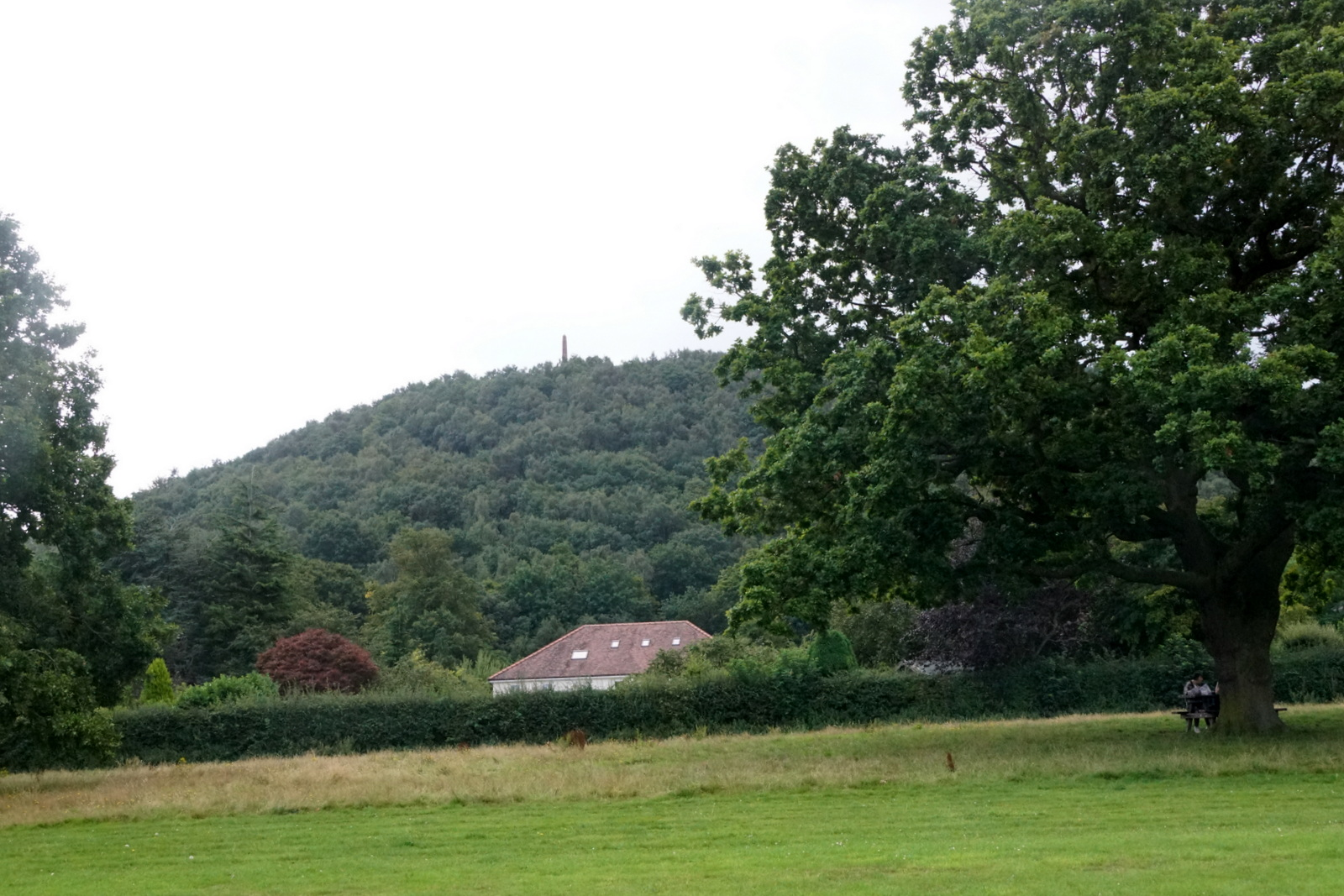
Frodsham Hill

Frodsham sits beneath the imposing wooded escarpment of Beacon Hill, which is also known locally as Frodsham Hill or Overton Hill and whose top attains a height of just over 500 feet (152 m). The hill forms the northern end of the Mid-Cheshire Ridge, a range of sandstone hills that extends southwards to Delamere Forest and Tarporley.

The northern boundaries of the modern parish are defined by the River Weaver (canalised in part as the Weaver Navigation) and the inner Mersey Estuary into which it flows. The Manchester Ship Canal runs parallel to the Mersey along the northern edge of the low-lying ground of Frodsham Marsh and Lordship Marsh, which themselves extend south and east to the built-up area of Frodsham.

The town is close to the junction of the A56, the main link between Chester and Warrington, with the B5152 road, which runs southeast to connect with Kingsley, Northwich and Tarporley in the centre of the county. The Chester–Manchester railway line passes through the town and the M56 motorway runs parallel to the road and railway along the southeastern edge of the marsh. The formerly separate settlements of Netherton and Overton form the southern districts of the town while the easternmost section towards Frodsham Bridge is known as Newtown.

=== Geology ===
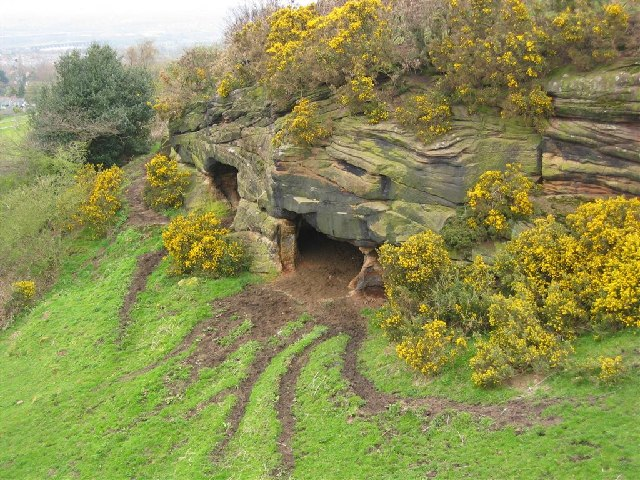
Overton caves

The parish, like most in Cheshire, is underlain by a suite of sedimentary rocks dating from the Triassic Period. They comprise (in ascending order) the early Triassic age Kinnerton Sandstone, Chester and Wilmslow Sandstone formations together with the Late Triassic age Helsby Sandstone, Tarporley Siltstone and Sidmouth Mudstone formations. Those formations up to and including the Helsby Sandstone Formation are assigned to the Sherwood Sandstone Group. It is this formation whose relatively hard-wearing sandstones form the higher ground of Beacon Hill, Woodhouse Hill and Harrol Edge. The younger siltstones and mudstones are assigned to the Mercia Mudstone Group. The sequence of sandstones is exposed in a railway cutting and two road cuttings, which are collectively designated as a geological Site of Special Scientific Interest.

Several faults run roughly northwest–southeast through the area, notably the Overton Fault, which roughly parallels the B5439 and B5152 roads, and the Frodsham Fault, which runs north from the vicinity of Crowmere to the mouth of the River Weaver. Both of these faults and others in the area downthrow to the east. Movement on them is thought to have taken place in the Tertiary period. The uplift resulted in trapping the water table at an elevation of around 200 feet (61 m) at which level springs developed.

Overlying the bedrock are a variety of superficial deposits (otherwise known as drift). These comprise a thin and patchy cover of glacial till (or 'boulder clay'), largely a legacy of the last ice age, together with spreads of glacio-fluvial sand and gravel, a product of the eventual deglaciation of the area. Recent alluvium fills the deeply incised valley of the Weaver and also extends across the Marsh to the Mersey estuary.

=== Climate ===
Being close to the west coast and the Irish Sea, the climate is generally temperate with few extremes of temperature or weather. The mean average temperature in the years 1971 to 2000 was 9.4 to 9.7 °C, slightly above the average for the United Kingdom as was the average amount of annual sunshine at 1391 to 1470 hours. The average annual rainfall was 741 to 870 mm, slightly below the average for the UK. The average number of days in the year when snow is on the ground is 0 to 6, which is low for the United Kingdom. The average number of days of air frost is 2 to 39, which is also low.

== Demography ==
The population of Frodsham parish at the 2021 census was 9,300.

97.1% of the population identified as White, 1.3% Mixed, 1.0% Asian, 0.3% Black and 0.3% other.

Christianity was the most common religion in the 2021 census, at 57.5%. 36.2% said they had no religion. Minority religions were 0.4% Buddhism, 0.3% Islam, 0.2% Hinduism, 0.2% Judaism, 0.0% Sikhism and 0.3% other.

== Transport ==
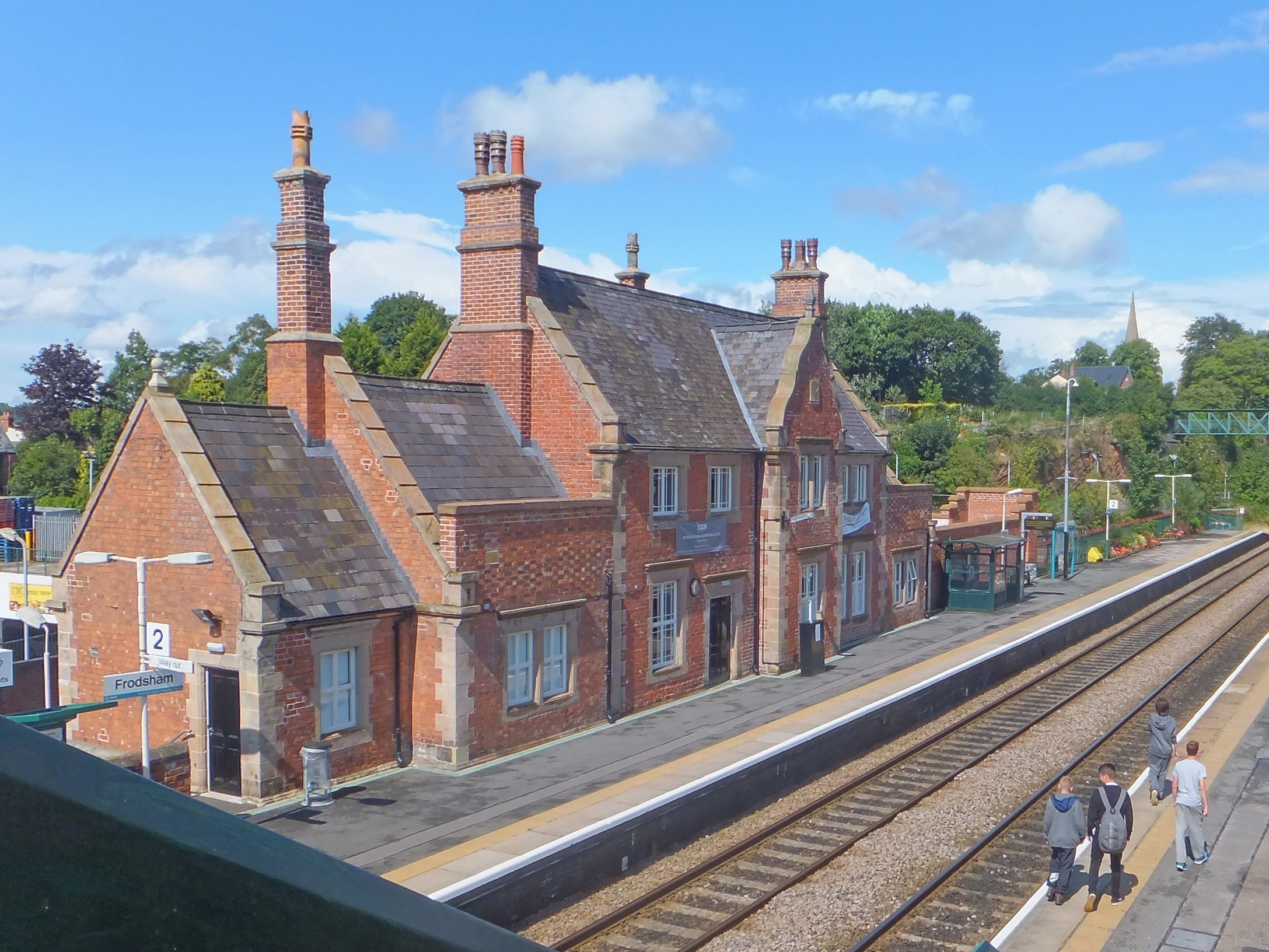
Frodsham Railway Station

Frodsham railway station is managed by Transport for Wales. It runs an hourly service between Manchester Piccadilly and Llandudno via Frodsham and Chester. There is a hourly direct service to Liverpool. There are also infrequent services by Northern between Ellesmere Port and Helsby.

Bus services are available to Chester, Runcorn, Ellesmere Port, Hatchmere (adjacent to Delamere Forest) and to Northwich. Frodsham is 14 miles (23 km) from Liverpool John Lennon Airport and 22 miles (35 km) from Manchester Airport.

== Education ==
There are four primary schools in Frodsham: Frodsham Manor House Primary School; St Luke's Catholic Primary School; Frodsham Church of England Primary School; and Frodsham Weaver Vale Primary School. The only secondary school in the town, Frodsham School, a science and technology college, closed in 2009 and has been converted into a health clinic, library and leisure centre.

== Religion ==
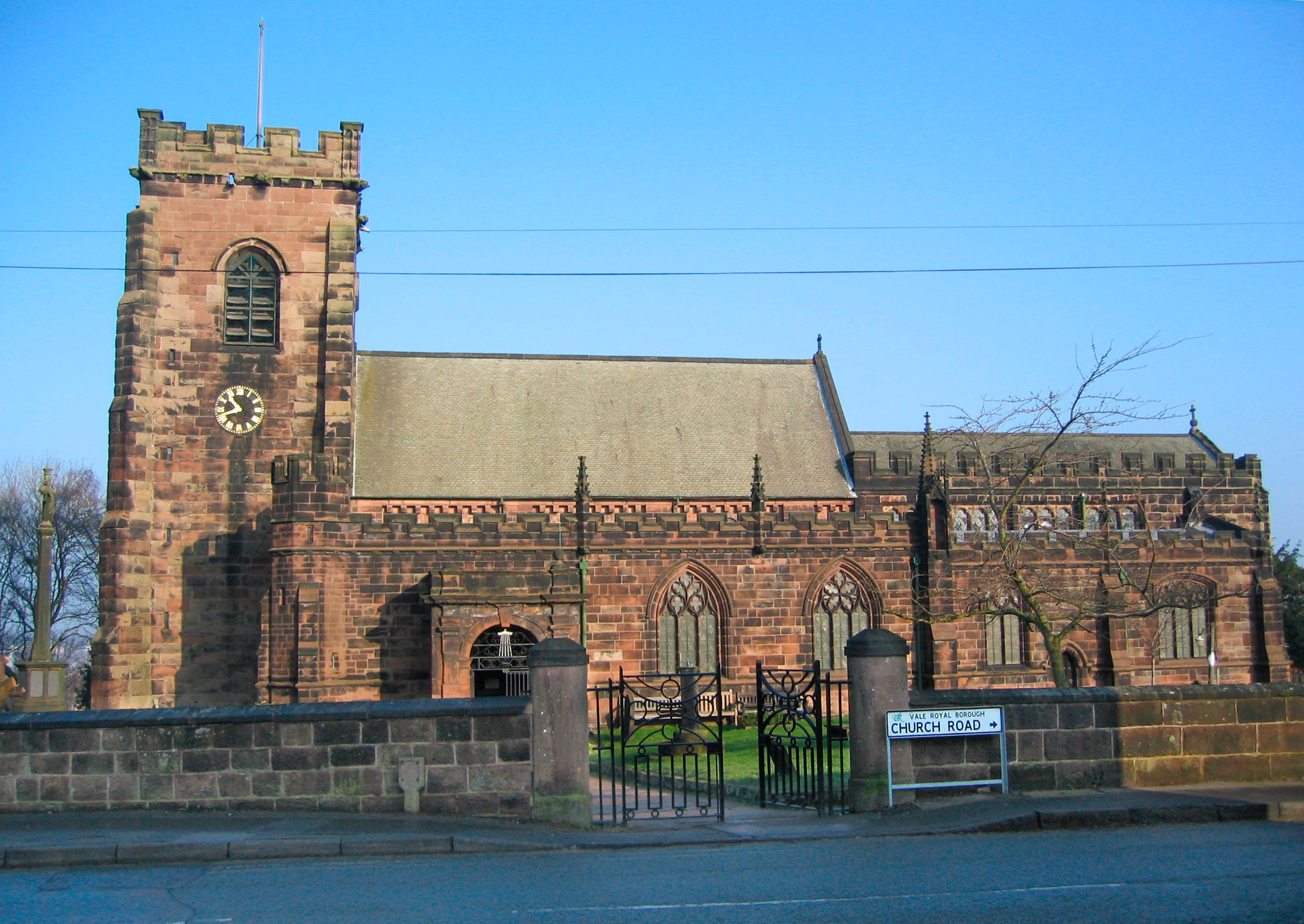
St Laurence's Church

There is one Anglican church in Frodsham, St Laurence's on Church Road, Overton, which is Grade I listed.. The building dates from the 12th century, though there was a church listed in the 11th century Domesday survey. It Frodsham Methodist Church is on Kingsley Road, also just outside the centre of Frodsham in the Five Crosses/Overton area of the town. The town has, in the past, had a number of Methodist churches built to replace older chapels. Most recent to close were Trinity Wesleyan Methodist Chapel (later Trinity Methodist Church) and Bourne Primitive Methodist Chapel (later Bourne Methodist Church). The spire of Trinity is still a visible landmark in the town. The Roman Catholic church is St. Luke's in High Street. There are two Evangelical churches, Main Street Community Church and King's Church (Free Methodist) on Chester Road.

== Governance ==
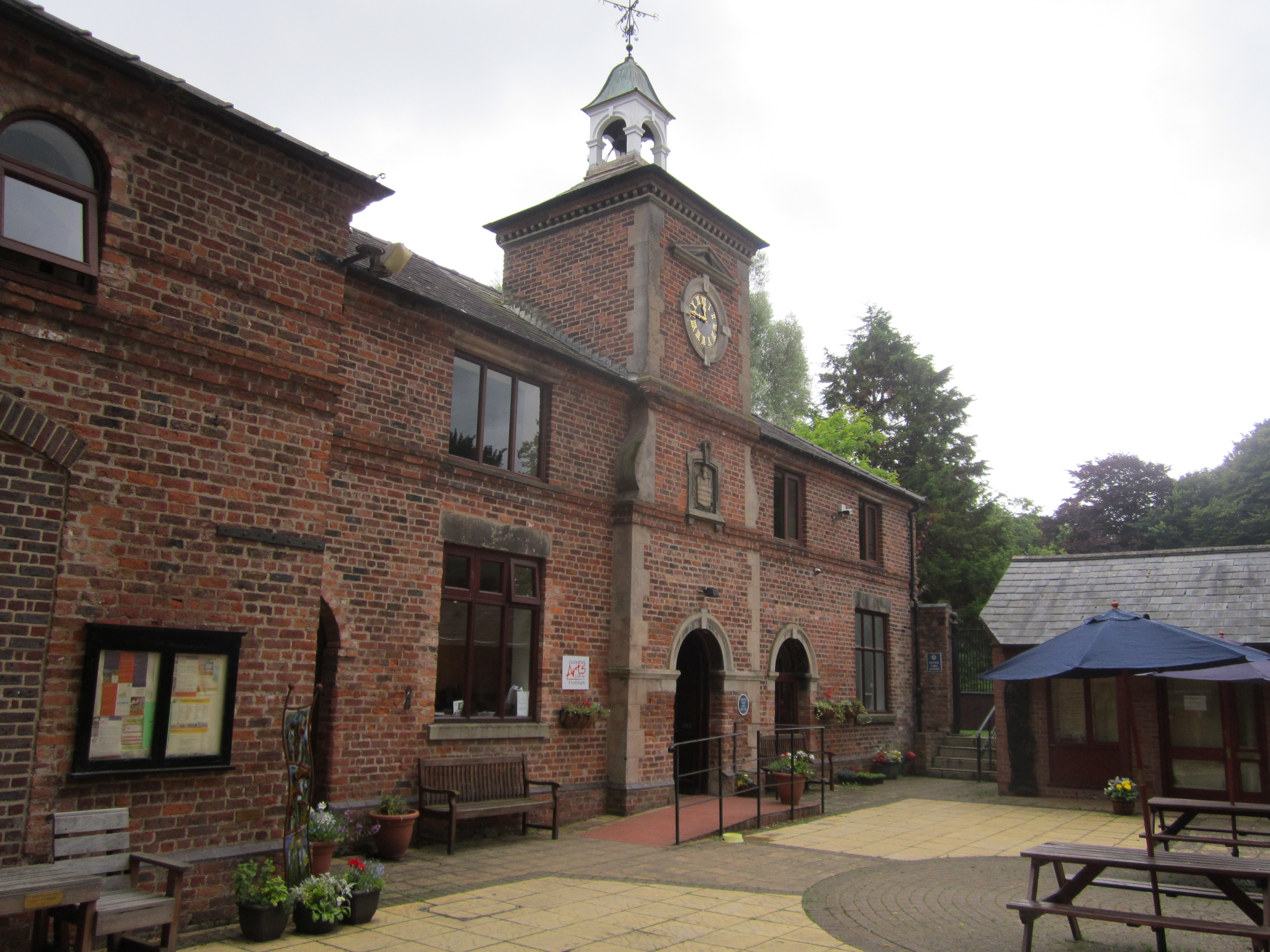
Castle Park Arts Centre, the meeting place of Frodsham Town Council

Frodsham lies within the administrative area of Cheshire West and Chester Council. Two councillors are elected from the Frodsham ward to serve on that council. The Frodsham ward has the same boundaries as the town's own parish boundaries.

Frodsham Town Council is the local council or parish council for Frodsham. This council is made up of 16 councillors. The town councillors are elected from one of four parish wards called Waterside Ward, Lakes Ward, Overton & Five Crosses Ward and Castle Park Ward. Four councillors are elected from each ward. These town councillors are elected to serve four-year terms of office, the most recent elections being on 7 May 2015. If any vacancy occurs during the four-year term, ten local parishioners from the relevant ward can require a by-election to be held, otherwise the other town councillors can co-opt an eligible person to be a councillor. The last by-election occurred in September 2013 in West ward. The last co-option occurred in September 2011 in North ward.

The then Frodsham Parish Council resolved to style itself a town in 1992. From 1992 to 2012 the chairman of the council served as the town mayor but using the courtesy title of 'Mayor of Frodsham'. However, strictly, the chairman was only entitled to be known as 'town mayor'.

In April 2012, the council resolved to split the roles of chairman and mayor, and separate votes are now held for each position. The council also resolved to create a convention offering the mayorship to the councillor who had served the longest since last being mayor, or having been first elected regardless of any political or personal affiliations.

== Media ==
Local news and television programmes are provided by BBC North West and ITV Granada. Television signals are received from the Winter Hill TV transmitter. Frodsham's proximity to North Wales means that BBC Wales and ITV Cymru Wales can also be received from the Moel-y-Parc TV transmitter.

Local radio stations are BBC Radio Merseyside, Capital North West & Wales, Heart North West, Smooth Radio North West, and Dee Radio.

The town's local newspaper is the Chester and District Standard.

In November 2014, Frodsham made national headlines due to a hoax in which it was claimed that actor William Shatner would be turning on the town's Christmas lights. A Twitter account, @Frodshamxmas, having spent the preceding weeks presenting itself as (though never directly claiming to be) the official social media account for the town's festivities, tweeted that the Star Trek actor would be making an appearance. Several local news outlets, local councillors and the local MP unwittingly retweeted the claims until Shatner issued a tweet confirming them to be false. The perpetrator(s) of the hoax have never come forward.

== Notable people ==
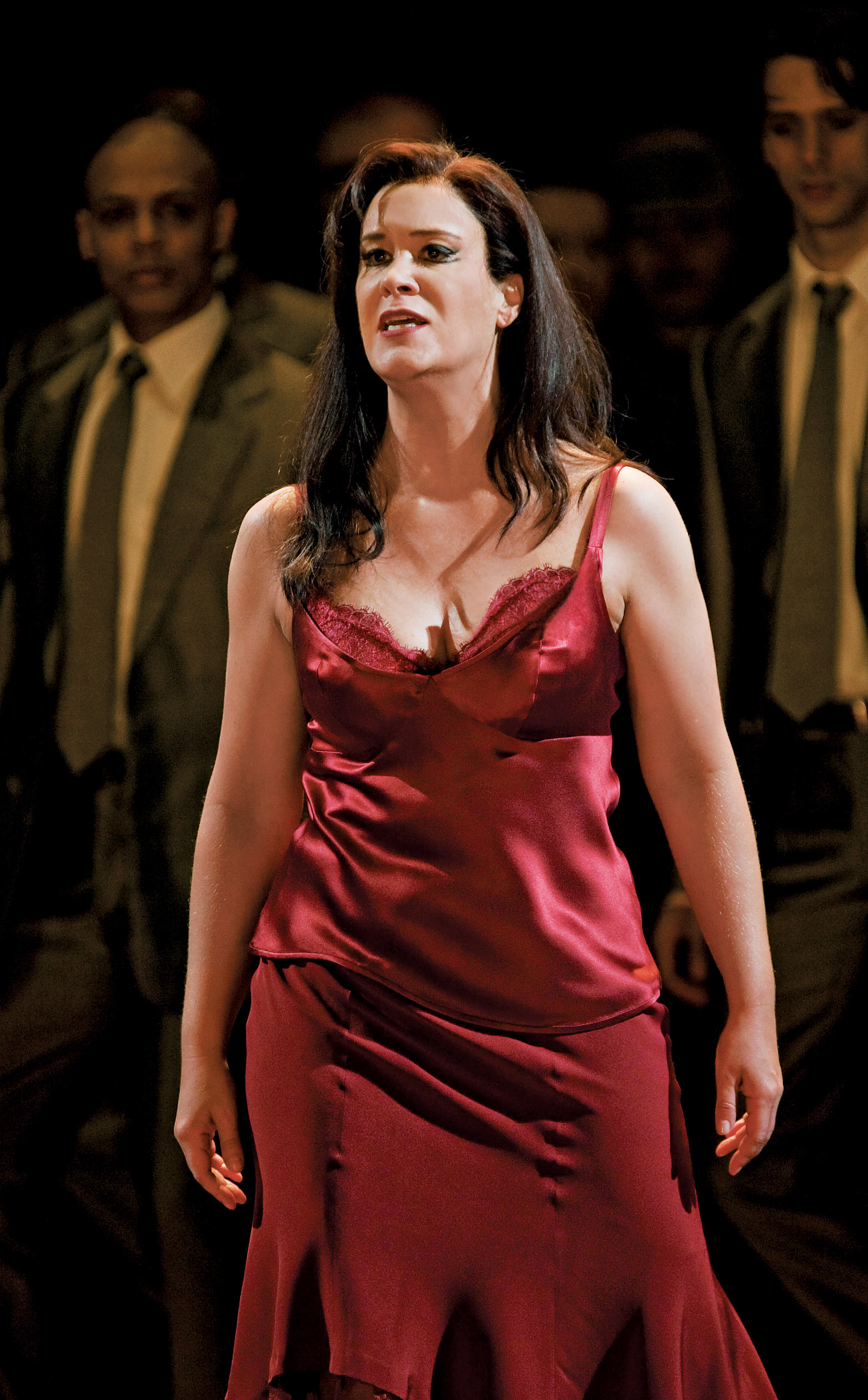
Alice Coote, 2007

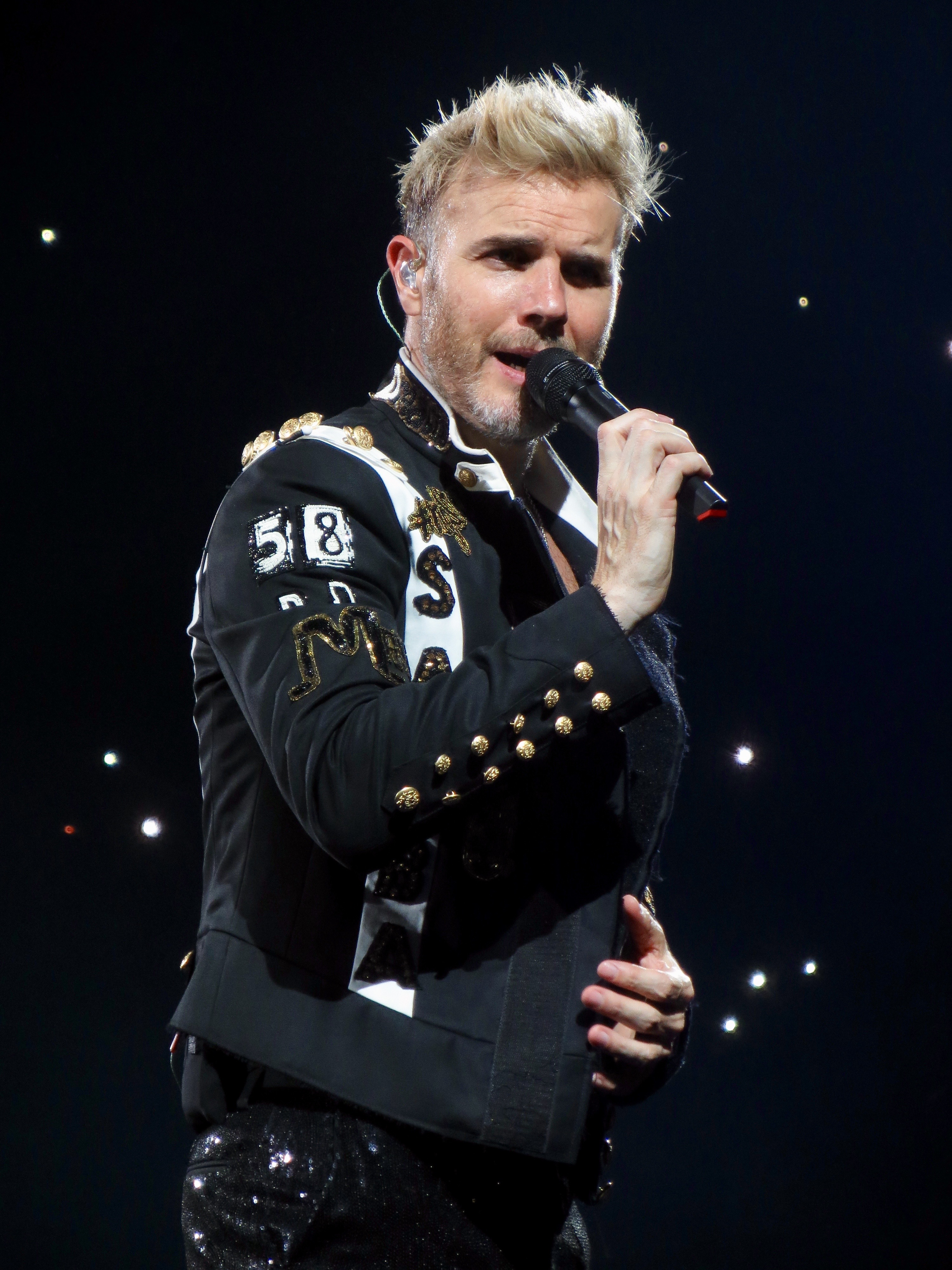
Gary Barlow, 2017

- Ebenezer Latham (c.1688–1745), Presbyterian minister, medical doctor; born in Mickledale.
- Bridge Frodsham (1734–1768), actor, was born in Frodsham, mainly worked in York.
- William Charles Cotton (1813–79), introduced beekeeping to New Zealand, vicar of Frodsham 1859–1879.
- Holbrook Gaskell Jr. (1846–1919), chemical industrialist, died at his house Erindale in Frodsham.
- Harriet Shaw Weaver (1876–1961), feminist political activist, patron of James Joyce; born in Frodsham.
- John Latham (1937–2021), poet and physicist, worked on atmospheric electricity and climate engineering
- Bob Carolgees (born 1948), TV entertainer, owned a candle shop at local Lady Heyes Craft Centre.
- Patrick Larley (born 1951), classical composer, conductor, organist and solo singer, born locally.
- Tim Firth (born 1964), dramatist, screenwriter and songwriter.
- Paul Marsden (born 1968), former MP for Shrewsbury and Atcham 1997 to 2005, was born in Frodsham.
- Alice Coote (born 1968), mezzo-soprano, was born in Frodsham.
- Daniel Craig (born 1968), actor, lived in Frodsham from 1972 to his early teens, at the Ring o' Bells pub where his father was landlord.
- Gary Barlow (born 1971), singer, pianist, songwriter and producer, was born and brought up in Frodsham.
- Emma Cunniffe (born 1973), film, stage and TV actress; brought up and went to school in Frodsham.

=== Sport ===
- Benny Jones (1920 – 1972), footballer who played 126 games
- Phil Turner (1927–2014), footballer who played 195 games
- Djibril Cissé (born 1981), ex-Liverpool, Sunderland footballer. played 452 games and 41 for France, lived locally as Lord of the Manor of Frodsham.
- Max Cleworth (born 2002), professional footballer currently playing for Wrexham, was born in Frodsham.

== See also ==
- Bear's Paw Hotel, Frodsham
- Frodsham Castle
- Frodsham railway station
- Frodsham School
- Listed buildings in Frodsham
- St Laurence's Church, Frodsham
