= Poems of the Past and the Present =

Collection of poems by Thomas Hardy

Poems of the Past and the Present is the second collection of poems by English poet Thomas Hardy, and was published in 1901. A wide-ranging collection, divided into five headings, it contains some of Hardy's most powerful and lasting poetic contributions.

== Reception and thematics ==
The unusually favourable reception of the collection was due in large part to its opening with the section of 'War Poems', many previously published independently, and welcomed by the public for their treatment of the Boer War — the seminal Drummer Hodge being the outstanding example.

Hardy's friend Sir George Douglas called some of the collection's poems Aeschylean, and Hardy himself considered that the 'Doom' themes in the work overlapped with those in The Dynasts. However, he had been careful in the collection's Preface to disclaim any organised philosophy therein, adding that "Unadjusted impressions have their value..."

== Notable pieces ==
Among other notable pieces were his poem 'Well-beloved', on the transient succession of a man's love-ideal; and "The Darkling Thrush", the humorous piece "The Ruined Maid", and the dour sequence "In Tenebris".

== See also ==
- Heinrich Heine
- Rupert Brooke
- War poetry
