= Holbrook Gaskell (born 1846) =

British businessman (1846–1919)

Holbrook Gaskell Jr. (7 December 1846 – 2 July 1919) was a chemical industrialist in Widnes, Cheshire, England.

He was the eldest son of Holbrook Gaskell, founder of Gaskell, Deacon & Co. and his wife Frances Anne Bellhouse and was born in Patricroft on 7 December 1846. He was educated at Owen's College, Manchester. He became a partner in his father's business, and subsequently became a director when this formed part of the United Alkali Company. He was also a director of the Liverpool District Lighting Company and the Radpath Brown and Company.

Outside of his directorships he served as a justice of the peace for the County of Lancashire. He was a keen sailor being the Rear-Commodore of the Royal Mersey Yacht Club and a member of the Royal Anglesey Yacht Club.

He married first, in 1873, Jane Stanley Shipman, daughter of Robert Milligan Shipman of Bredbury Hall, Stockport, with whom he had one son who was also named Holbrook Gaskell, and three daughters. He married secondly Edith, daughter of John Alcock, Bredbury, Stockport and had a son and a daughter.

In 1879 he was chairman of The Widnes Workman's Public House Co. Ltd., whose establishments provided only non-alcoholic drinks.

He died on 2 July 1919 at his house Erindale in Frodsham, Cheshire.
