= Holbrook Gaskell =

British industrialist and art and plant collector

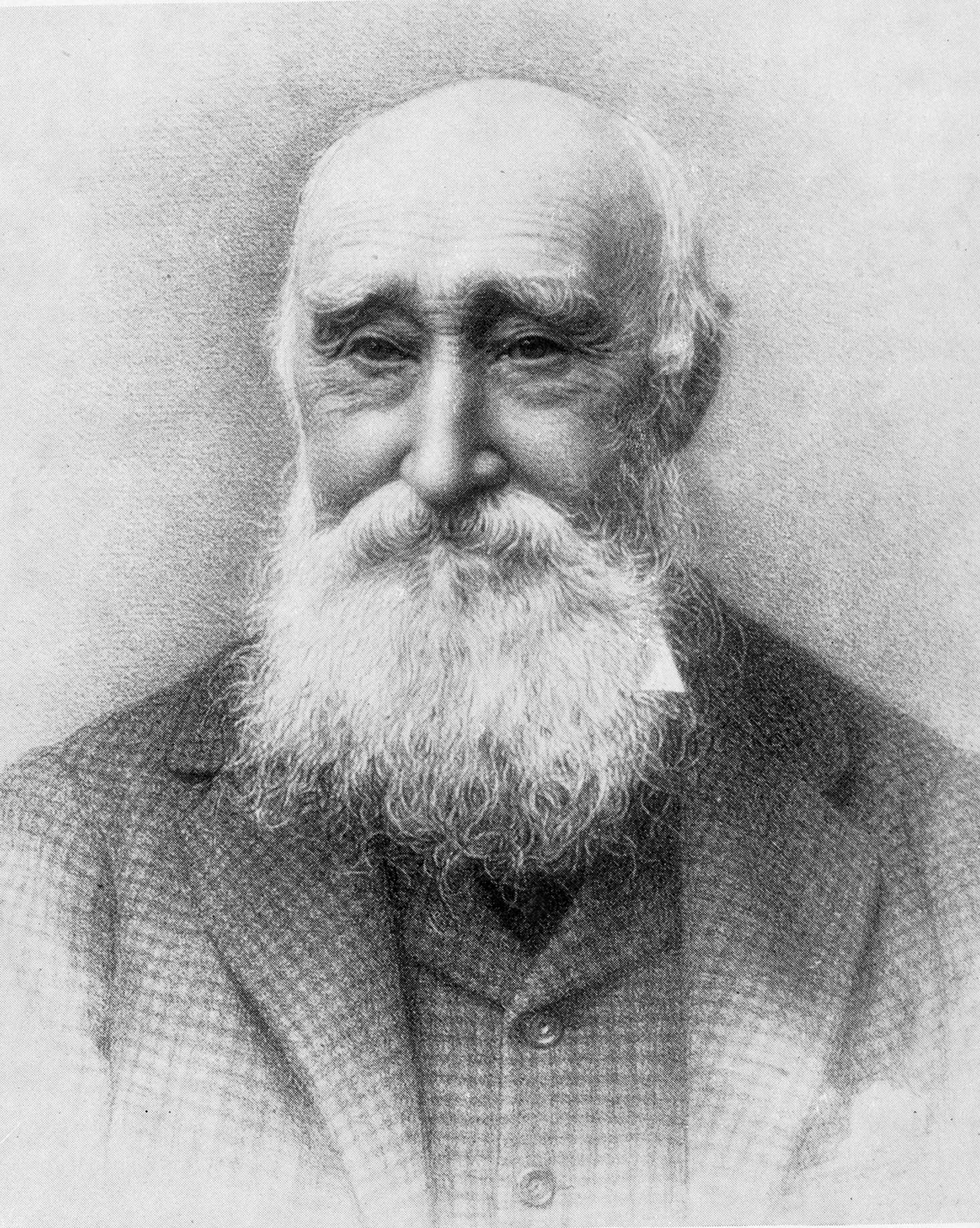
- Holbrook Gaskell
- Born: 5 March 1813; Wavertree, Liverpool, England
- Died: 8 March 1909 (aged 96); Woolton Woods, Liverpool
- Known for: alkali
- Scientific career
- Fields: Chemist

Holbrook Gaskell (5 March 1813 – 8 March 1909) was a British industrialist, and an art and plant collector.

== Early life ==
Gaskell was born in Wavertree, Liverpool. He was the eldest son of Roger Gaskell, a sailcloth manufacturer, from his marriage to his cousin Anne Hunter. He was baptised at the Paradise Street Unitarian Chapel in Liverpool. He was the cousin of the Unitarian minister William Gaskell, (husband of the novelist Mrs Gaskell), and was from a Unitarian family himself. He was educated privately at a school in Norton near Sheffield and then in 1827 he worked as an apprentice clerk in the firm of Yates, Cox and Co, who were iron merchants and nail makers in Liverpool.

== Nasmyth, Gaskell and Co. ==
In 1836 he formed a partnership with James Nasmyth which led to the creation of Nasmyth, Gaskell and Company and the building of the Bridgewater Foundry at Patricroft near Manchester. Nasmyth recalls this in his biography "He had served his time at Yates and Cox, iron merchants, of Liverpool. Having obtained considerable experience in the commercial details of that business, and being possessed of a moderate amount of capital, he was desirous of joining me, and embarking his fortune with me. He was to take charge of the counting-house department, and conduct such part of the correspondence as did not require any special knowledge of mechanical engineering. I am much pleased by the frank and friendly manner of Mr. Gaskell, and I believe that the feeling between us was mutual. We continued working together for a period of sixteen years; and I believe Mr. Gaskell had no reason to regret his connection to the Bridgewater Foundry".

== Marriage ==
Gaskell married Frances Ann Bellhouse in 1841, who was the daughter of Henry Bellhouse of Manchester and niece of David Bellhouse, the Manchester builder Nasmyth and Gaskell had contracted during the initial building of the Patricroft site. Over the next 14 years they had nine children, six daughters and three sons.

== Gaskell, Deacon and Co. ==
In 1855 Gaskell was well enough to enter into a second partnership with the industrial chemist Henry Deacon, who had worked with him in Nasmyth, Gaskell & Co. Nasmyth wrote "In course of time the alarming symptoms [of his illness] departed, and he recovered his former health. He then embarked in an extensive soda manufactory, in conjunction with one of our pupils, whose taste for chemistry was more attractive to him than engine-making. A prosperous business was established, and at the time I write these lines [1885] Mr. Gaskell continues a hale and healthy man, the possessor of a large fortune, accumulated by the skillful manner in which he has conducted his extensive affairs."

Deacon's plant in Widnes was set up to develop the ammonia-soda process that Deacon believed he could make successful. However, after various setbacks Gaskell could not see this making money and he forced Deacon to abandon the venture. Instead they established one of the largest and most successful Leblanc factories in Widnes. Gaskell's three sons, Holbrook II, James Bellhouse Gaskell and Frank Gaskell all became partners in the company.

In 1860 when the governments of Britain and France formed a treaty to raise duties on materials made from salt, Holbrook Gaskell went with Edmund Knowles Muspratt to Paris to negotiate terms for the manufacturers. Gaskell remained a director of the company until 1890 when it became part of the United Alkali Company. He became vice-president and later president of that company.

== Other activities ==
Gaskell served as a magistrate in Widnes, was an active liberal and a member of the Liverpool Reform Club, supporting causes including the extension of the franchise. He endowed a chair of botany and provided chemistry laboratories at University College, Liverpool. He paid for public baths in Widnes and supported convalescent homes in Heswall and Southport. He was involved with the Liverpool Daily and Weekly Post and Echo and when this amalgamated with the Liverpool Mercury in 1904 he became its chairman. He owned a fine art collection which included works by Turner and Constable which was loaned to the Walker Art Gallery in 1885.

With his accumulated wealth Holbrook Gaskell moved to Woolton Woods in Much Woolton. He became a renowned collector of orchids. Frederick Sander, an orchid dealer, received a new Cattleya species in 1883 from his collector Seidl and named it Cattleya gaskelliana after Holbrook Gaskell in recognition of a good customer and someone who "by great diligence has acquired one of the finest collections of orchids in the North of England".

When he died in 1909 at Woolton Woods his probate was almost £500,000. He was buried in the churchyard of Cairo Street chapel, Warrington. The estate of Woolton Woods passed to his sons who sold it to Col. James P. Reynolds, who in turn sold it to Liverpool City Council.
