= Sowrey =

Sowrey is a surname. Notable people with the surname include:

- Ben Sowrey (born 1991), English rugby union player
- Frederick Sowrey (1893–1968), flying ace of the First World War
- Freddie Sowrey (1922–2019), senior Royal Air Force officer, son of Frederick

== See also ==
- Sorey
