= John Candy (RAF officer) =

British World War I flying ace (1897–1955)

- Born: John Geoffrey Sadler Candy; 19 February 1897; Froyle, Hampshire, England
- Died: 11 May 1955 (aged 58); East Kingston, West Sussex, England
- Burial place: St Margaret's Church, Angmering, West Sussex
- Spouse: Eileen Marcella Going (m. 1933; died 1954)
- Military career
- Allegiance: United Kingdom
- Branch: British Army; Royal Air Force
- Service years: 1916–1937; 1939–1946
- Rank: Wing Commander
- Units: Royal Sussex Regiment; No. 19 Squadron RFC; No. 99 Squadron RAF
- Conflicts: First World War; Second World War
- Awards: Distinguished Flying Cross; Mentioned in Despatches

John Geoffrey Sadler Candy, DFC (19 February 1897 – 11 May 1955) was a British aviator, military officer, and flying ace credited with six aerial victories during the First World War. He transferred to the Royal Air Force in 1919, and retired in 1937, but was recalled to serve throughout the Second World War, retiring permanently in 1946.

== Early life ==
Candy was born on 19 February 1897 in Froyle, Hampshire, England. He was the eldest son of John Alfred Sadler Candy, a farmer, and Emily Louisa French Candy.

== Military career ==
Candy graduated from the Royal Military College, Sandhurst on 26 October 1916, receiving a commission as a Second Lieutenant in the Royal Sussex Regiment.

=== Royal Flying Corps career ===
On 2 May 1917 Candy was seconded to the Royal Flying Corps as a temporary Flying Officer. He was assigned to No. 19 Squadron to fly the SPAD S.VII. He began his scoring streak on 26 August 1917; in cooperation with Alexander Pentland and three other pilots, he destroyed a DFW reconnaissance aircraft over Moorseele. On 30 September, he once again had help in driving down a German two-seater down out of control; on that occasion from Richard Alexander Hewat, Frederick Sowrey, and two other pilots. On 9 October, he teamed with Sowrey and Hewat to drive down an Albatros reconnaissance aircraft. After another shared win on 11 November 1917, two days later, he cooperated with Albert Desbrisay Carter in the destruction of an Albatros D.V. His sixth win, on 29 December 1917, was a solo one, when he drove down another D.V.

On 3 June 1918 he was awarded the Distinguished Flying Cross in the King's Birthday Honours. On 6 July 1918 he was appointed flight commander with acting rank of Captain. On 1 August 1919 Candy was granted a permanent commission in the RAF with the rank of Captain, while also formally resigning his army commission.

=== Royal Air Force career ===
On 5 October 1921 Candy was posted to the RAF Depot (Inland Area), and on 1 October 1923 was assigned to No. 1 School of Technical Training (Boys) at Halton. He then served in the Middle East, being posted to the Aircraft Depot, Iraq, on 27 November 1924, then served as Station Commandant at Basrah from 5 January 1926, before transferring to the RAF Depot, Egypt, on 2 January 1927. On 12 December 1928 he was promoted to Squadron Leader.

On 30 June 1934 Candy was posted to No. 99 (Bomber) Squadron at RAF Upper Heyford for flying duties, and on 11 July 1935 was posted to the Royal Air Force College Cranwell for engineer duties. On 12 September 1937 Candy, at his own request, was placed on the RAF retired list.

However, Candy was recalled to duty on 25 August 1939, just prior to the outbreak of the Second World War. He was transferred to the RAF Technical Branch on 24 April 1940. On 23 September 1941 Candy (now an acting Wing Commander) was mentioned in despatches. He finally reverted to the retired list on 26 January 1946, retaining the rank of Wing Commander.

== Personal life ==
On 2 September 1933, at St Martin-in-the-Fields, London, he married Eileen Marcella Going, the elder daughter of Dr. R. M. Going, of Tollbridge.

Candy died at East Kingston, near Littlehampton, West Sussex, on 11 May 1955. He is buried with his wife (died 3 July 1954) at St Margaret's Church, Angmering, West Sussex.

== Bibliography ==
- Shores, Christopher F.; Franks, Norman & Guest, Russell (1990). Above the Trenches: A Complete Record of the Fighter Aces and Units of the British Empire Air Forces 1915–1920. London, UK: Grub Street. ISBN 0-948817-19-4.
