= Richard Alexander Hewat =

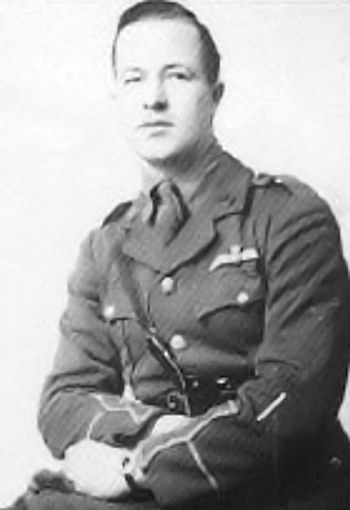
- Richard Alexander Hewat, 1918
- Born: May 3, 1896; Lawrence, Massachusetts
- Died: August 14, 1918 (aged 22); Near Bailleul, France
- Burial place: Arras Flying Services Memorial, Pas de Calais, France
- Military career
- Allegiance: United States
- Branch: Royal Air Force (United Kingdom)
- Units: Royal Air Force: No. 19 Squadron RAF; No. 87 Squadron RAF
- Conflicts: World War I

Richard Alexander Hewat (3 May 1896 – 14 August 1918) was an American pursuit pilot who flew with the Royal Flying Corps (RFC) in World War I. He joined the RFC in 1917 and was killed in action near Bailleul in France on 14 August 1918. He was a flying ace, having shot down six aircraft during the war.

== Biography ==
Born in Lawrence, Massachusetts, he was the son of R. A. J. and Jessie Bell Hewat. Richard Alexander Hewat's father was co-founder of Strong, Hewat and Company. "Alex" Hewat was one of five brothers from Briggsville, Massachusetts who fought in the Great War. He was a "crack end" on Tad Jones' undefeated football team at Exeter Academy in 1915.

He joined the Royal Flying Corps in June 1917 and was posted to 19 Squadron in September. Scoring his third victory on 26 October 1917, his SPAD VII was hit by ground fire and Hewat received a head wound. When he recovered, he was reassigned to 87 Squadron and returned to France in April 1918. Flying the Sopwith Dolphin, Hewat scored three more victories before he was killed in action, probably shot down by Hermann Leptien.

== List of aerial victories ==
Combat Record
No.	Date / Time	Aircraft / Serial No.	Opponent	Result	Location	Notes
No. 19 Squadron RFC/RAF
1	30 September 1917 @ 09:00	SPAD S.VII (A6662)	C	Driven down 'out of control'	Gheluwe	Shared with Captain Frederick Sowrey, Lieutenant Delamere (B3489), Lieutenant RM Strang (B1697) and Lieutenant John Candy
2	9 October 1917 @ 10:40	SPAD S.VII (A6662)	Albatros C	Driven down 'out of control'	Moorslede	Shared with Lieutenant John Candy and Captain Frederick Sowrey
3	26 October 1917 @ 10:20	SPAD S.VII (A6662)	C	Driven down 'out of control'	North of Gheluwe	
No. 87 Squadron RFC/RAF
4	19 July 1918 @ 09:30	Sopwith Dolphin (E4434)	Albatros D.V	Driven down 'out of control'	South East of Arras	
5	20 July 1918 @ 10:15	Sopwith Dolphin (E4434)	DFW C	Destroyed	Tortequesne	
6	9 August 1918 @ 18:00	Sopwith Dolphin (C4155)	Fokker D.VII	Destroyed	Foucaucourt	

== See also ==
- List of World War I flying aces from the United States
