= Gordon Budd Irving =

Canadian WWI flying ace

- Born: 16 May 1898; Toronto, Canada
- Died: 11 August 1918 (aged 20); Vicinity of Albert, France
- Burial place: (1) Pas de Calais, France (2) Toronto, Canada
- Military career
- Allegiance: George V of the British Empire
- Branch: Royal Flying Corps
- Service years: 1917–1918
- Rank: Captain
- Unit: No. 19 Squadron RAF
- Awards: Distinguished Flying Cross

Captain Gordon Budd Irving was a Canadian World War I flying ace credited with twelve aerial victories.

== Early life ==
Gordon Budd Irving was the sole son of attorney William Henry Irving and Mary Maude Smith Irving. His childhood home was at 76 Spadina Street, Toronto; he attended church nearby at Trinity Methodist Church (present-day Trinity-Saint Paul's United). After education at the Huron Street Public School and University of Toronto Schools, he was briefly employed by National Trust Company.

== World War I service ==
Irving then joined the Royal Flying Corps in May, 1917 and sent to Camp Borden for training. He shipped out for England in July 1917. By November of that year, he had been trained and posted to No. 19 Squadron RFC. He was assigned a Sopwith Dolphin to fly.

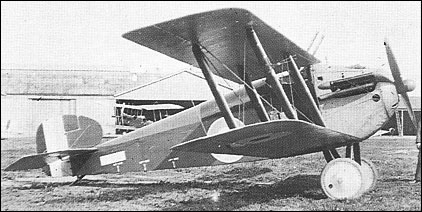
A new Sopwith Dolphin awaiting squadron markings.

Irving scored his first aerial victory on 24 March 1918; by 2 July, his count was up to three enemy planes destroyed and eight driven down out of control. During five of these victories, he had teamed with other aces, including Cecil Gardner, Finlay McQuistan, John Aldridge, James Hardman, and fellow Canadian Albert Desbrisay Carter. Irving had also risen to the position of Flight Commander in May.

== Decoration and death ==
On 3 August, he was awarded the Distinguished Flying Cross. Eight days later, in a dogfight during a patrol, he drove down a Pfalz D.III fighter for his ninth out of control victory. Irving was reported as missing in action, as three Dolphins went down that day, one of them on fire. Irving's body was not recovered.

His Officer Commanding, Major D. J. Pretyman, wrote "...he is a great loss to my squadron as he was loved by all the officers and men, besides being a very gallant gentleman and always ready to do his best." The Prince of Wales posthumously awarded the DFC to Irving's sister, Mrs. Kathleen Purves. The most likely claimants for victory over Irving were either Justus Grassmann or Alois Heldmann.

== Honours and awards ==
Distinguished Flying Cross (DFC)

Lt. (T./Capt.) Gordon Irving.

He has carried out numerous offensive patrols, and under his leadership many enemy formations have been successfully engaged. He has personally accounted for six enemy aircraft, and by his consistent keenness and fearlessness he sets a fine example to the pilots in his squadron.
