= Cecil Gardner =

Cecil Vernon Gardner
- Born: 14 September 1889; Broughton, Oxfordshire, England
- Died: 30 September 1918 (aged 29); Vicinity of Bapaume, France
- Burial place: Grévillers British Cemetery, Pas de Calais, France
- Military career
- Allegiance: United Kingdom
- Branch: British Army; Royal Air Force
- Service years: 1915–1918
- Rank: Captain
- Unit: No. 19 Squadron RAF
- Conflicts: World War I
- Awards: Distinguished Flying Cross

Captain Cecil Vernon Gardner DFC (14 September 1889 – 30 September 1918) was an English World War I flying ace credited with ten aerial victories.

== Biography ==
=== Early life ===
Gardner was born in Broughton, Oxfordshire, the son of James and Hannah Elizabeth Gardner, and grew up at Grovehill Farm in the parish of Tingewick, Buckinghamshire. He was educated at the Royal Latin School, Buckingham.

=== Military service ===
Gardner enlisted in the British Army in December 1915, transferring to the Royal Flying Corps in March 1917 as an air mechanic 2nd class. April 1917 saw the RFC suffering crippling losses against superior German aircraft and tactics, and Gardner was commissioned as a probationary second lieutenant on 19 July of that year, and was confirmed in his rank on 7 October.

After completing flying training, Gardner was assigned to No. 19 Squadron RFC in January 1918, flying the Sopwith Dolphin. On 1 April 1918, the Royal Flying Corps and the Royal Naval Air Service merged to create the Royal Air Force. Gardner's first victory came on 6 June 1918 during the German spring offensive, that had begun in March, pushing the British back over all of the ground they had gained since the Battle of the Somme in 1916, bringing down a DFW C.V over Vieux-Berquin. It was shared with three other pilots, Gordon Budd Irving, Finlay McQuistan, and John De Pencier. Three days later, on 9 June, he destroyed another DFW C.V solo over Neuf-Berquin. In July, he brought down a further four enemy aircraft. 8 August saw the start of the decisive Allied counter-offensive that, in the 100 days up to 11 November 1918, crushed the German Army, and on 11 August Gardner shot down two enemy aircraft in one afternoon. The next day, 12 August, he was appointed a temporary captain. He shared his ninth victory, on 16 September 1918, with James Hardman. His final fight took place on 27 September, when he destroyed a Fokker D.VII over Haynecourt, bringing his total to six enemy aircraft destroyed and four driven down out of control. Gardner was then shot down by German ace Leutnant Gustav Borm of Royal Prussian Jagdstaffel 1, and fatally injured. He died of his wounds three days later.

Gardner was awarded the Distinguished Flying Cross, but it was not gazetted until 2 November 1918, three days after his death. His citation read:

Lieutenant (Temporary Captain) Cecil Vernon Gardner.

A bold and skilful leader, who has carried out many offensive patrols, proving himself at all times to be a brilliant fighting pilot. During recent operations he has accounted for eight enemy machines.

Gardner was buried at Grévillers British Cemetery, outside Bapaume, near to where he was shot down. His name is also recorded on the War Memorial at the Church of St Peter and St Paul, Buckingham, together with that of his older brother, Percy, killed on the Western Front on 24 May 1917, while serving as a private in the London Regiment (Artists Rifles).

== Bibliography ==
- Franks, Norman (2002). Dolphin and Snipe Aces of World War I. London, UK: Osprey Publishing. ISBN 978-1-84176-317-0.
- Shores, Christopher F.; Franks, Norman & Guest, Russell F. (1990). Above the Trenches: a Complete Record of the Fighter Aces and Units of the British Empire Air Forces 1915–1920. London, UK: Grub Street. ISBN 978-0-948817-19-9.
