= John Leacroft =

British World War I fighter ace

- Born: 4 November 1888; Derby, Derbyshire, England
- Died: 26 August 1971 (aged 82); Bexhill, Sussex, England
- Military career
- Allegiance: United Kingdom
- Branch: British Army; Royal Air Force
- Service years: 1909, c. 1914–1937, 1939–1945
- Rank: Group Captain
- Units: Army Service Corps; Royal Flying Corps: No. 19 Squadron; No. 14 Squadron
- Commands: No. 17 Squadron RAF; RAF Thornaby
- Awards: Military Cross & Bar

Group Captain John Leacroft MC & Bar (4 November 1888 – 26 August 1971) was a World War I fighter ace credited with 22 victories. He remained in the Royal Air Force until 1937, and returned to service during World War II in administrative roles.

== Early life ==
John Leacroft born on 4 November 1888, the son of Dr John William Leacroft. He was educated at Aldenham School before going up to Pembroke College, Cambridge. He first joined the British Armed Forces when he was commissioned as a second lieutenant for service with the senior division of the University of Cambridge Officers' Training Corps on 3 February 1909, but he resigned this commission on 1 November the same year.

== World War I service ==
Leacroft joined the Army Service Corps with the outbreak of war in 1914, and served with them in France and Egypt. He had been promoted to captain by the time he transferred to the Royal Flying Corps in 1915.

Leacroft was originally posted as an observer with No. 14 Squadron RFC in Egypt in 1916. He saw action during the Senussi Uprising and the second Turkish attack on the Suez Canal as part of the Sinai and Palestine campaign. After receiving pilot training he was appointed a Flying Officer on 20 March 1917, and posted to No. 19 Squadron RAF to fly Spad VIIs in May 1917, just as low-level ground attack sorties were being introduced in the lead up to the Battle of Messines. He scored his first victory on 17 June 1917. He tallied one each in July and August, and a double on 1 September to become an ace. By the end of the month he was a double ace. He had been appointed a Flight Commander on 22 July 1917. After four more triumphs in October, he was withdrawn from the front. Two of his October victories came in support of Allied troops during the Third Battle of Ypres, when on other occasions he carried a box of 25 lb bombs in his cockpit, as the Spad had no bomb racks. For these missions, he was awarded the Military Cross on 27 October 1918, the citation, published the following March, read:

T./Capt. John Leacroft, Genl. List and R.F.C. For conspicuous gallantry and devotion to duty. On one occasion he flew at a very low altitude in extremely bad weather and successfully engaged enemy troops with machine-gun fire, and on another occasion carried out a most valuable reconnaissance and engaged enemy troops from a height of 100 feet. He destroyed two hostile machines, and has proved himself a courageous and determined pilot.

When he returned for another tour of duty in early 1918, 19 Squadron had become the first unit to be equipped with the new Sopwith Dolphin. The squadron returned to operations on 13 February 1918. There followed a period of teething problems with the new aircraft. To add to these difficulties, the Dolphins were attacked by fellow British pilots because the unfamiliar Dolphin was assumed to be German.

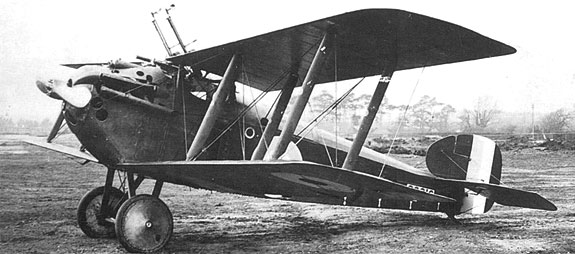
Sopwith Dolphin. Leacroft flew this model for his final eight victories. Note the two upward tilted machine guns.

Leacroft drove down two Albatros D.Vs on 15 March 1918 with his new aircraft. Then the Allied forces were faced with the German spring offensive. He followed his earlier March victories by burning a Pfalz D.III out of the air on 23 March; the following day saw another double victory by Leacroft. On 27 March he carried out a desperate ground attack mission against German troops using a road near Albert, Somme, this was quoted in the official British history, The War in the Air as an example of the tactics used to stop the offensive, and earned him a Bar to his MC, awarded on 22 June 1918. The citation read:

T./Capt. John Leacroft, M.C., Gen. List and R.F.C. For conspicuous gallantry and devotion to duty. During a period of six months he has destroyed four and has brought down completely out of control six hostile machines. In all he has destroyed eight enemy machines and driven down thirteen out of control. On one occasion, when leading an offensive patrol, his formation destroyed six enemy planes and drove another down out of control without suffering any damage itself. He has displayed exceptional qualities as a leader, and his patrols have always been characterised by vigour and dash.

Victories on 12 April and 2 May rounded out his list of wins. He had survived being shot down twice. In turn, he had destroyed ten enemy aircraft; two of those wins had been shared with other pilots. Leacroft had also driven down out of control a dozen opponents. He ranked second out of the 20 aces in his squadron. Many of his initial combats had come against members of Richthofen's Flying Circus. His Squadron Commander in 1918, E. R. "Toby" Pretyman, described him as "an outstanding pilot and the best flight commander on the Western Front in his time". He was presented with both his MC and Bar by King George V in an investiture at Buckingham Palace on 26 September 1918.

== Post World War I ==
Leacroft had been granted a permanent commission in the Royal Air Force on its formation in 1918, and he continued his career after the war, taking the new RAF rank of flight lieutenant. His first post-war duty was as a flying instructor at the new RAF College Cranwell from 1920 to 1922, he was then posted to RAF Iraq Command where he would stay until 1924. On 1 January 1924, he was promoted to squadron leader. Later in 1924 he took command of No. 17 Squadron at RAF Hawkinge. He commanded the squadron until 1928 when he was posted as chief flying instructor with No. 3 Flying Training School at RAF Grantham. After two years there he was posted to RAF Halton in 1930, and after promotion to wing commander on 1 January 1932, took charge of administration at No. 1 School of Technical Training there in February 1933, commanding No. 1 Apprentice Wing.

On 15 June 1937 it was announced that he would be the next station commander at RAF Thornaby, and on 2 July 1937, he was promoted to group captain. Thornaby had previously housed No. 9 Flying Training School, but now took in reconnaissance squadrons of No. 16 Group, RAF Coastal Command. Leacroft served until his retirement on 1 December 1937.

He was still in the Reserve of Air Force Officers on 12 June 1939, when he was recalled to duty as a squadron leader. He returned to the active list as a wing commander on 1 September 1939. In 1942 he was appointed president of the Air Crew Selection Board, then based at Cardington, Bedfordshire. He retired again on 19 April 1945. In retirement, he settled in Bexhill-on-Sea where he died on 26 August 1971.

== Private life ==
Leacroft married Gladys, daughter of George Underhill Cuddon in 1926. Gladys lived until 22 March 1977, when she died in Clifton, Bristol, a requiem mass was held at Clifton Cathedral on 29 March. They were survived by their only daughter, Diana.

Leacroft was a noted sportsman in his younger days. Before World War I, he hunted regularly with the Belvoir Hunt (among others). Between the wars, he represented the RAF at cricket, polo and shooting—competing at Bisley.
