= No. 21 Squadron RAAF =

Royal Australian Air Force squadron

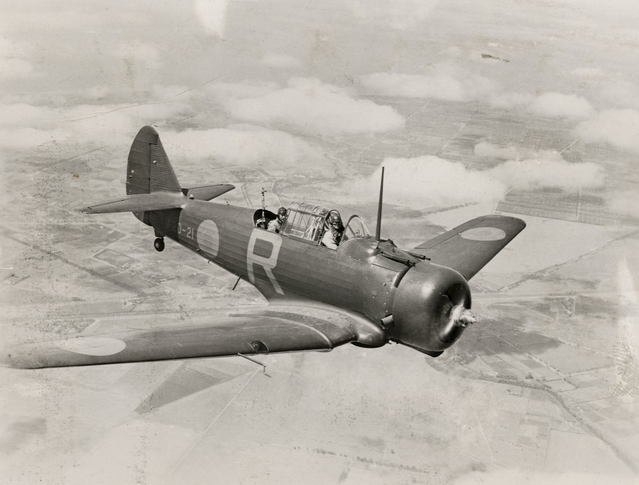
- A No. 21 Squadron Wirraway in 1940
- Active: 1936–current
- Branch: Royal Australian Air Force
- Role: Air base operations
- Part of: No. 96 Wing RAAF
- Garrison/HQ: RAAF Base Point Cook
- Motto(s): Coronat Victoria Fortes (Victory Crowns the Brave)

Commanders
- Notable commanders: Charles Eaton (1937–1938)

No. 21 (City of Melbourne) Squadron RAAF is a Royal Australian Air Force (RAAF) Airbase Operations squadron. Formed in the mid-1930s as a unit of the part-time Citizen Air Force (CAF), it was mobilised for service during World War II, when it saw action against the Japanese as a fighter unit in the Malayan campaign, a dive bomber unit in the New Guinea campaign, and a heavy bomber unit in the Borneo campaign. After the war, the squadron continued to fly until 1960, when the CAF ceased flying operations. At that time, No. 21 Squadron converted to a non-flying support role, which it currently fulfils at RAAF Base Point Cook and RAAF Williams - Laverton.

== History ==
=== Formation ===
No. 21 Squadron was formed at RAAF Station Laverton on 20 April 1936, as a Citizen Air Force (reserve) squadron. Under the command of Squadron Leader J.H. Summers, the squadron had a cadre of regular RAAF personnel who served alongside the part-time members of the CAF and initially operated a variety of aircraft including Hawker Demons, Westland Wapitis and de Havilland Gipsy Moths. With these aircraft, the squadron undertook several tasks. As a CAF squadron, training was its main role; its personnel were instructed in fighter tactics, bombing and army co-operation duties; they were also used for search-and-rescue tasks and public relations duties. The squadron also received Avro Ansons and Bristol Bulldogs in late 1936 and early 1937. In May 1937, Charles Eaton took over as squadron commander.

=== World War II ===
Following the outbreak of World War II, the squadron was mobilised and its personnel placed on full-time service. The tempo of training increased as the squadron was brought up to strength and prepared for its first operational missions. This came on 15 December when aircraft from the squadron were assigned to convoy escort duty. Following this, the squadron undertook similar missions in the Great Australian Bight, providing protection for ships sailing for Europe. Initially, the squadron operated Demons, Ansons, Avro Cadets and a North American NA-16; shortly afterwards it was re-equipped with the Australian-built CAC Wirraway and switched to an army co-operation role.

==== Fighter unit in Singapore and Malaya ====
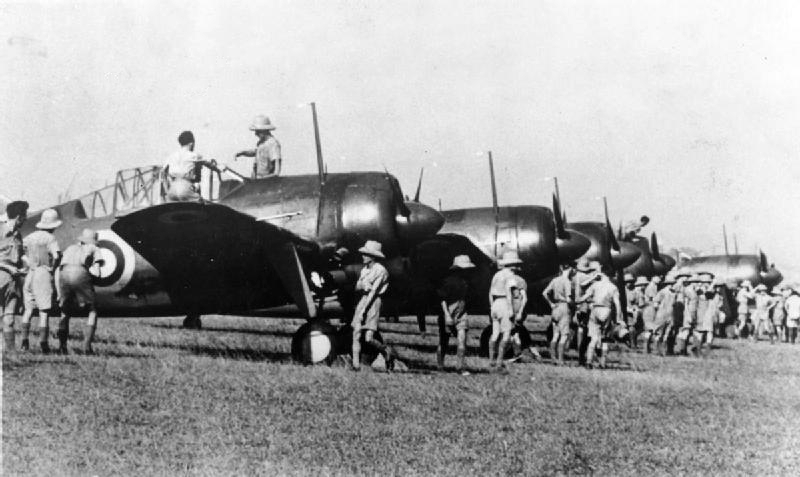
Brewster Buffaloes being inspected by Royal Air Force (RAF) personnel at Sembawang airfield, Singapore.

In August 1940, the squadron was dispatched to Seletar, on Singapore, where it operated its Wirraways in support of ground forces that had been stationed there amid concerns of war with the Japanese. In early 1941, No. 21 Squadron, the squadron was re-designated a fighter unit and was sent to Sembawang to re-equip with the Brewster Buffalo. In mid-1941, as war with Japan became more likely, the squadron was sent to Malaya, operating out of Sungai Petani, where they augmented four other British Commonwealth, including No. 453 Squadron RAAF. The five British Commonwealth units—including two RAF and one Royal New Zealand Air Force squadrons—that flew Buffalos in the Malayan campaign were beset with numerous problems, including poorly built and ill-equipped planes; inadequate supplies of spare parts; inadequate numbers of support staff; airfields that were difficult to defend against air attack; lack of a clear and coherent command structure; antagonism between RAF and RAAF squadrons and personnel, and inexperienced pilots lacking appropriate training.

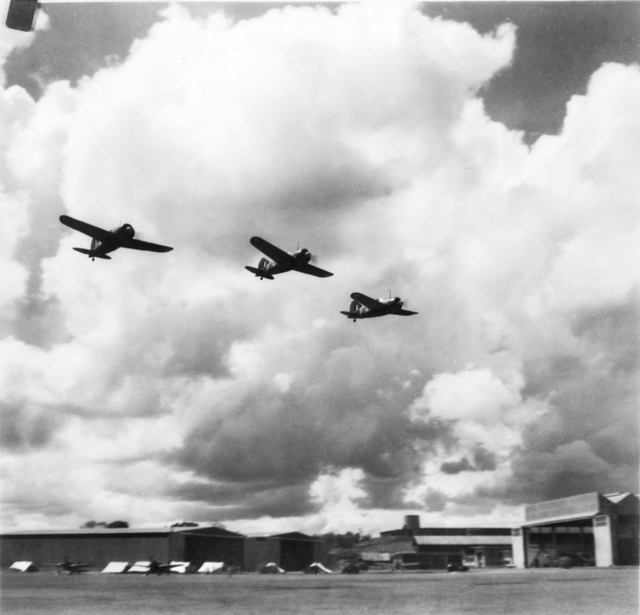
Brewster Buffalo aircraft of No. 21 Squadron flying over Sembawang airfield, Singapore.

The squadron's involvement in the fighting came on 8 December 1941, following a heavy Japanese bombing raid on Sungai Petani, which resulted in the loss or damage of several of its aircraft. Initial interception operations proved unfruitful and, as a result of heavy damage to the airfield, the squadron was withdrawn to Ipoh, falling back through Butterworth, where they squadron achieved its first air-to-air victory, when a Buffalo piloted by Flying Officer Harold Montefiore shot down a Mitsubishi A6M Zero single-engined fighter. Despite this success, though, No. 21 Squadron suffered severe losses to Japanese fighters, on the ground and in the air, during the first week of the campaign; replacements were only limited, resulting in the squadron's operational merger with 453 Squadron.

Together the merged squadron continued operations, but they were withdrawn again, this time back to Singapore. Operating once more out of Sembawang, 21/453 Squadron, as it became known, flew convoy escort, reconnaissance, air defence and bomber escort missions. In mid-January the squadron experienced a couple of instances of success. On 16 January, while escorting a flight of Vickers Vildebeest light bombers, six of the squadron's Buffaloes shot down three Japanese fighters that rose to attack the Vildebeests. Later, on 26 January, two more Japanese fighters were destroyed and another possibly shot down during a bomber escort mission over Endau.

The Endau mission proved to be No. 21 Squadron's last, though, as it had its remaining aircraft taken away and was split from No. 453 Squadron. At this point, the squadron's surviving pilots and ground crew were sent to Java via Sumatra in the Dutch East Indies where they undertook ground support duties before being evacuated to Australia. The squadron was disbanded in Fremantle in March 1942.

==== Bombing roles in New Guinea and Australia ====
===== Close air support =====
In September 1943 No. 21 Squadron was re-formed at Gawler, South Australia, and re-equipped with Vultee Vengeance dive bombers. (See also: )

In November the unit moved to Lowood, Queensland, for advanced training. In January and February 1944 the squadron transferred to Nadzab in New Guinea to undertake operations. By the end of February the unit had commenced attacks on Japanese barge hide-outs on the Wagol River. Supply dumps and concentrations of troops were also attacked and the squadron took part in large air raids on the Japanese airstrips at Hansa Bay, Madang and Alexishafen in concert with Nos. 23 and 24 Squadrons.

Following further attacks in March against Japanese camps around Pommern Bay and Rempi village, the Vengeance was withdrawn from front-line operational service in New Guinea, as Allied commanders deemed its short flying range unsuitable for the conditions. As a result, No. 21 Squadron returned to Australia on 13 March 1944 moving to Camden, New South Wales.

===== Long-range heavy bombers =====
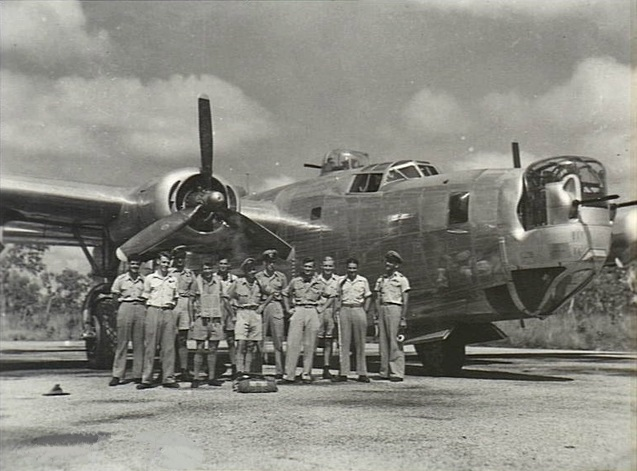
The crew of a No. 21 Squadron Liberator at Fenton Airfield, NT.

From June 1944, at Leyburn, Queensland, the squadron converted to Consolidated B-24 Liberator heavy bombers. Conversion training took six months and as a result, the unit did not see operational service again until 11 January 1945, when, as part of No. 82 Wing RAAF, it attacked targets at Laga and a radio station at Moena Island, operating out of Fenton. During January and February more than a hundred missions were flown against Japanese targets. On 6 April, near Koepang, along with Liberators from No. 24 Squadron, the squadron attacked a convoy of ships including the cruiser Isuzu. The attack proved unsuccessful. Other targets attacked included troop areas at Tawo and fuel tanks in Tarakan and Borneo. From July, while the main force remained at Fenton, the squadron sent a detachment to Morotai Island. In the final months of the war the squadron's last operations were concentrated around supporting the Allied landings at Labuan and Balikpapan.

Following the end of the war the unit's aircraft were used as shipping escorts and as transports before returning to Tocumwal, New South Wales. During the war, 42 men from the squadron were killed in action or died on active service. Members from the squadron received the following decorations: five Distinguished Flying Crosses and one Mention in Despatches.

=== Post-war ===
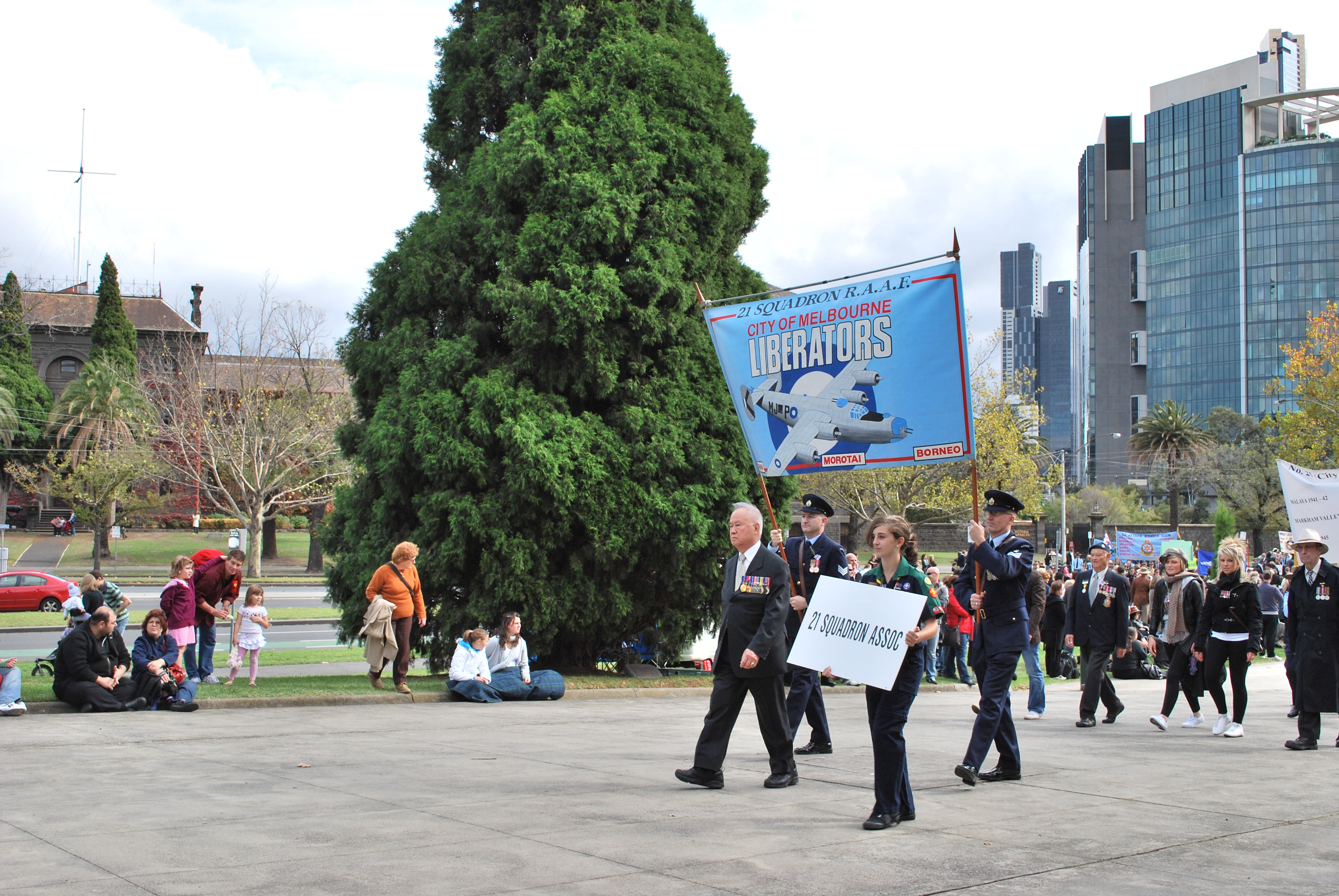
No. 21 Squadron veterans marching in the 2009 Anzac Day march

In April 1946, the squadron relocated to RAAF Base Amberley and in December 1947, No. 21 Squadron began to replace its Liberators with Avro Lincoln bombers. An aircraft was lost at Amberley on 19 February 1948, killing all 16 people on board. After being briefly renamed No. 2 Squadron from February to April 1948, the squadron was re-formed as No. 21 (City of Melbourne) Squadron at RAAF Laverton as a Citizen Air Force (reserve) fighter squadron. It flew CAC Wirraway, P-51 Mustang and de Havilland Vampire aircraft from 1948 until 1960. It also operated a Sikorsky S-51 helicopter in a search and rescue role and in 1959 the Wirraways were replaced by Winjeels.

The squadron ceased flying operations on 2 June 1960, when the role was removed from the CAF's responsibility. It subsequently became a non-flying general reserve squadron headquartered at RAAF Williams near Melbourne. On 1 July 2010, No. 21 (City of Melbourne) Squadron amalgamated with Combat Support Unit Williams to become an integrated Permanent Air Force and Reserve unit responsible for airfield and base support and reserve training.

== Battle honours ==
For its involvement in World War II, the squadron received the following battle honours:

- Malaya 1941–1942
- New Guinea 1944,
- Markham Valley 1944,
- Morotai 1945, and
- Borneo 1945.
