= Frederick Sowrey =

British flying ace (1893–1968)

- Born: 25 August 1893; Twigworth, Gloucestershire, England
- Died: 21 October 1968 (aged 75); Eastbourne, Sussex, England
- Relatives: Air Marshal Sir Freddie Sowrey (son)
- Military career
- Allegiance: United Kingdom
- Branch: British Army (1914–18); Royal Air Force (1918–40)
- Service years: 1914–1940
- Rank: Group captain
- Units: Royal Fusiliers; No. 39 (Home Defence) Squadron RFC; No. 37 (Home Defence) Squadron RFC; No. 19 Squadron RFC
- Commands: No. 143 Squadron RAF; No. 41 Squadron RAF; RAF Northolt
- Conflicts: First World War; Second World War
- Awards: Distinguished Service Order; Military Cross; Air Force Cross

Group Captain Frederick Sowrey, DSO, MC, AFC (25 July 1893 – 21 October 1968) was a British aviator, military officer, and a flying ace of the First World War credited with thirteen aerial victories. He was most noted for his first victory, when he shot down Zeppelin L32 during its bombing raid on England. Having risen rapidly in rank during the war, he remained in service until 1940.

== Early life and infantry service ==
Frederick Sowrey was born to Susan M. 'Cissy' Sowrey on 25 August 1893 in Twigworth, Gloucestershire. He was one of three sons of John William Sowrey, Deputy Chief Inspector of Inland Revenue. Frederick was home schooled until he was thirteen. He then won a scholarship to King's College School, Wimbledon. He earned a Bachelor of Science degree there, and was completing his graduate study when the First World War began. He immediately volunteered for military service; on 31 August 1914 he was commissioned as a second lieutenant in the Royal Fusiliers. He went to France as an infantry officer, and was wounded at the Battle of Loos in 1915. After three months in hospital, he was invalided out, turned around, and joined the Royal Flying Corps in December 1915.

== Royal Flying Corps ==
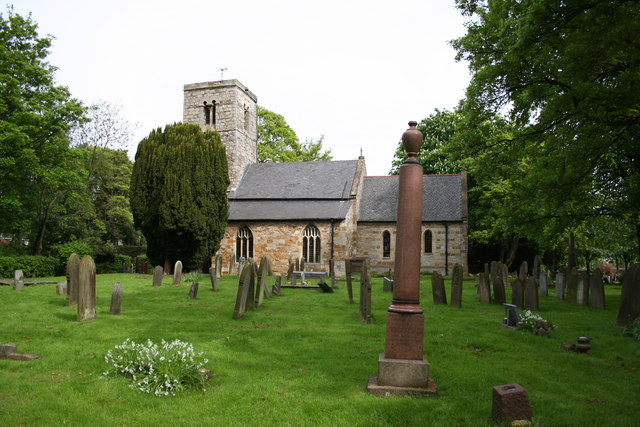
The Zeppelin L32 memorial shaft (right front) in Saint Giles’ Churchyard in Scartho.

Sowrey was posted to No. 39 (Home Defence) Squadron RFC on 17 June 1916; he was duly appointed a flying officer. It was during this assignment that he scored his first and most notable victory. On the evening of 23 September 1916, Sowrey launched from Sutton Farm at 2330 hours in a Royal Aircraft Factory BE.2c to patrol toward Joyce Green. Flying at 13,000 feet, he spotted Zeppelin LZ 74 (L 32) at about 0110 hours and closed with it. He fired three drums of incendiary ammunition into the belly of the gasbag before it exploded into flame. There were no survivors from the aircrew; most of the bodies recovered were charred and burned. The burning wreckage at Billericay drew enormous crowds.

Sowrey received the Distinguished Service Order for his feat, which was gazetted on 4 October 1916. That same day, Sowrey was nominated for a regular commission in the Fusiliers. Shortly thereafter, on 1 December, he was appointed a flight commander with the accompanying rank of temporary captain. Sometime in late 1916, he transferred to No. 37 (Home Defence) Squadron RFC.

Sowrey went on liaison duty to France, and while there transferred to No. 19 Squadron RFC on 14 June 1917. In the four months between 17 June and 15 October 1917, he scored a dozen aerial victories, both by himself and teamed with aces Alexander Pentland, John Candy, and Richard Alexander Hewat, as well as three other pilots. His final summary for the twelve victories other than the L32 tallied six enemy airplanes destroyed and six driven down out of control. For these feats, he was awarded the Military Cross on 23 November 1917. The citation for the award read: "For conspicuous gallantry and devotion to duty in shooting down in less than two months two Albatross scouts and a Rumpler two-seater and a Fokker scout, and in two engagements flying very low and engaging and scattering hostile infantry."

On 1 January 1918, Sowrey was advanced to squadron leader; this meant that Second Lieutenant (Acting Captain) Frederick Sowrey was now a temporary major. On 4 April 1918, he was promoted to the substantive rank of lieutenant. He assumed command of No. 143 Squadron RAF until war's end.

== Post-war career ==
Sowrey was awarded the Air Force Cross on 1 January 1919. He received a permanent commission in the new Royal Air Force, with the rank of squadron leader, on 1 August 1919. Sowrey's postwar career saw him posted to No. 41 Squadron RAF as its Officer Commanding on 2 February 1926, where he remained until 31 August 1928. For the last eight months of his tenure, he was concurrently Station Commander at RAF Northolt, which position he held from 6 January 1928 to 17 January 1929. Sowrey was promoted from squadron leader to wing commander on 1 July 1928. He retired as a group captain on 26 May 1940.
