= Finlay McQuistan =

Scottish World War I flying ace

- Born: 4 October 1896; Greenock West, Renfrewshire, Scotland
- Died: 4 September 1950 (aged 53); Glasgow, Lanarkshire, Scotland
- Military career
- Allegiance: United Kingdom
- Branch: British Army; Royal Air Force
- Rank: Captain
- Units: III Highland (Howitzer) Brigade, RFA; No. 12 Squadron RFC; No. 55 Squadron RFC; No. 19 Squadron RFC
- Conflicts: World War I • Western Front
- Awards: Distinguished Flying Cross

Captain Finlay McQuistan (Note: His first name his sometimes given as Finley and his last as McQuiston in various sources.) DFC (4 October 1896 – 4 September 1950) was a Scottish World War I flying ace who was credited with 11 aerial victories.

== Early life ==
Finlay McQuistan was the son of Finlay and Agnes J. McQuistan, and was born on 4 October 1896 in Greenock West, Scotland.

== World War I service ==
On 26 June 1916, he was seconded from duty with the III Highland (Howitzer) Brigade, Royal Field Artillery, part of the 51st (Highland) Division, to the Royal Flying Corps as a second lieutenant and flying officer. He was assigned to No. 12 Squadron RFC to fly a B.E.2 two-seater reconnaissance machine. A wounding in September ended this posting.

His next assignment, in March 1917, was to No. 55 Squadron RFC. On 9 June, he used a two-seater Airco DH.4 to score his first victory, being wounded again in the process. On 27 June, he was promoted to lieutenant, and 25 August, was appointed a flight commander with the temporary rank of captain.

On 1 March 1918, he reverted from the post of flight commander and rank of captain, with his seniority set back to 26 June 1916. This was probably as a result of transferring to No. 19 Squadron, where he could fly the new Sopwith Dolphin single-seat fighter. On 17 May, he scored his second victory. He was appointed flight commander and temporary captain again on 9 August, and by 5 October, he had added nine more victories, only one of which was a shared, with Gordon Budd Irving, John De Pencier, and Cecil Gardner. McQuistan's final tally was two German fighters set afire, another German aircraft destroyed, and eight sent down out of control.

== Postwar ==
On 24 October 1919, he was granted a short service commission as a flying officer. On 20 March 1922, he was removed from the Royal Air Force.

Finlay McQuistan was living at Corrieview, Queen-Street, Kirkintilloch, Scotland when he died on 4 September 1950.

== Honours and awards ==
Distinguished Flying Cross (DFC)
Lieutenant (Acting Captain) Finlay McQuistan.

"By his example of determination and courage Capt. McQuistan has inspired the greatest confidence in the other pilots of his squadron. He has led over 30 squadron offensive patrols, and the success attained by his squadron during the past three months is largely due to his skilful leadership. This officer has destroyed or driven down out of control nine enemy machines."

== Bibliography ==
- Shores, Christopher F.; Franks, Norman & Guest, Russell F. (1990). Above the Trenches: a Complete Record of the Fighter Aces and Units of the British Empire Air Forces 1915–1920. London, UK: Grub Street. ISBN 978-0-948817-19-9.
