= Rescue and Communication Squadron RAAF =

Royal Australian Air Force squadron

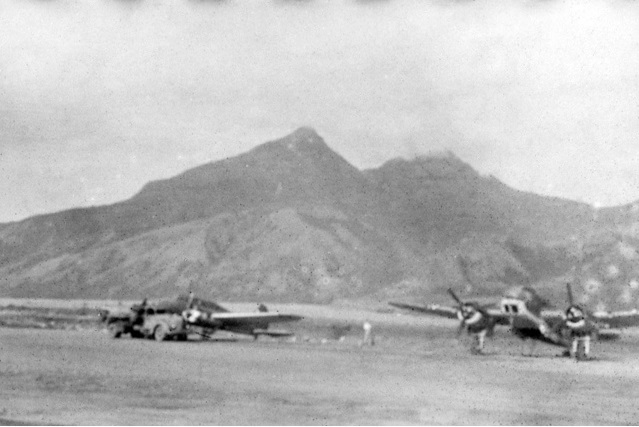
- An Avro Anson of the Rescue and Communication Squadron next to a Beaufort from No. 100 Squadron at Goodenough Island, July 1943
- Active: 1942–1943
- Country: Australia
- Branch: Royal Australian Air Force

Commanders
- Notable commanders: Jerry Pentland

The Rescue and Communication Squadron (also No. 1 Rescue and Communication Squadron) was a Royal Australian Air Force (RAAF) squadron formed during World War II. Raised for service during the New Guinea campaign, the squadron existed between October 1942 and November 1943, and undertook a variety of support roles including search and rescue, transportation, reconnaissance and casualty evacuation. Upon disbandment, it was used to raise two new communications units.

== History ==
Raised on 1 October 1942 at Port Moresby, the unit operated for around a year, serving in the New Guinea campaign. The unit was initially formed as a single flight, before being expanded to a full squadron in November 1942, under the command of Squadron Leader Jerry Pentland, a World War I veteran, who was considered the oldest pilot in the RAAF at the time, but who had extensive experience operating in New Guinea. At this time it was designated the "Rescue and Communication Squadron", although it was also sometimes referred to as "No. 1 Rescue and Communication Squadron".

The squadron was based at various locations around New Guinea, including Goodenough Island, and mainland airfields such as Vailala, Kerma, Amau, Dobodura, Gurney and Garaina. Crews often operated from remote airfield, isolated for many months. They operated across a very wide area, dropping supplies to Australian troops around Milne Bay; evacuating civilians from remote areas in the northern highlands; evacuating wounded soldiers from locations as far afield as Buin as well as along the Kokoda Track; and rescuing downed Australian and US airmen.

Tasked with many roles, including personnel and freight transportation; aerial survey; photographic reconnaissance; casualty evacuation; and search and rescue operations, the squadron operated a wide variety of aircraft, including de Havilland Tiger Moths, De Havilland Dragons, de Havilland Fox Moths, de Havilland Dragon Rapides and Avro Ansons. It was also responsible for "transmitting and relaying messages over the Owen Stanley Ranges", and for carrying out airfield suitability assessments as the Allies sought out sites for airfield construction and expansion to support ground operations in New Guinea.

In the search and rescue role, the squadron also used several flying boats, consisting of Supermarine Walruses, Dornier Do 24s and Consolidated PBY Catalinas. Many of the aircraft allocated to the squadron were obsolescent, but operating at low level they proved quite versatile and effective in evading Japanese aircraft, taking advantage of the low-take off and landing speeds to land in small clearings that other aircraft could not have utilised. The squadron's Walrus aircraft were also able to put down on narrow rivers where the larger Catalinas were unable to land.

Several aircraft were lost during the squadron's operations. On 21 October 1942, the squadron lost one aircraft to an accident shortly after take-off from Garalina, which killed its two crew members. Another aircraft was lost on 11 September 1943 during search and rescue operations to find the crew of a Bristol Beaufighter that had ditched off New Britain. A Walrus was also lost when it came under heavy machine gun and small arms fire while attempting a rescue close to shore.

Three members of the squadron were involved in rescuing crewmembers of a US Martin B-26 Marauder that crashed at Hood Point on 10 January 1943. Squadron Leader Walter Pye assumed command in June 1943, taking over from Pentland. The squadron continued operations until it was disbanded in November 1943, at which time it was split to form two new units: No. 8 and No. 9 Communications Units. The squadron was credited with rescuing more than 200 personnel.
