= No. 79 Wing RAAF =

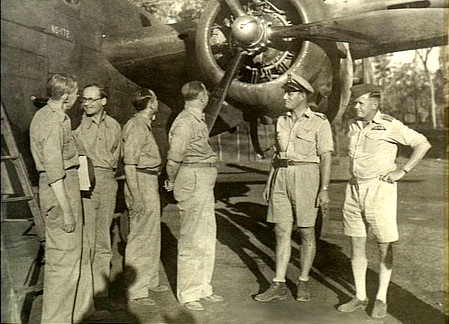
- Commanders of No. 18 (NEI) Squadron and No. 79 Wing: Lieutenant Colonel Asjes (second right) and Group Captain Ryland (far right) at Batchelor, Northern Territory, 1944
- Active: 1943–45
- Country: Australia
- Branch: Royal Australian Air Force
- Role: Attack
- Size: Two–four flying squadrons
- Part of: North-Western Area Command (1943–45); First Tactical Air Force (1945)
- Engagements: World War II: New Guinea Campaign; North-Western Area Campaign

Commanders
- Notable commanders: Charles Eaton (1943–44); John Ryland (1944–45)

Aircraft flown
- Attack: Beaufort
- Bomber: B-25 Mitchell; Ventura
- Fighter: Beaufighter; P-40 Kittyhawk

No. 79 Wing was a Royal Australian Air Force (RAAF) wing of World War II. It was formed in December 1943 at Batchelor, Northern Territory, as part of North-Western Area Command. Led by Group Captain Charles Eaton, the wing comprised four squadrons on its establishment, flying Beaufort and B-25 Mitchell bombers and Beaufighter heavy fighters. No. 79 Wing took part in the New Guinea and North-Western Area Campaigns during 1944–45, eventually transferring to Balikpapan in the Dutch East Indies as the Allies advanced northward. By the end of the Pacific War, the wing was attached to the Australian First Tactical Air Force and was made up of Nos. 2 and 18 (Netherlands East Indies) Squadrons, both flying Mitchells. The latter transferred to the Netherlands Air Force in late 1945, while the former returned to Australia where it disbanded the following year. No. 79 Headquarters itself disbanded in October 1945, soon after the end of hostilities.

== History ==
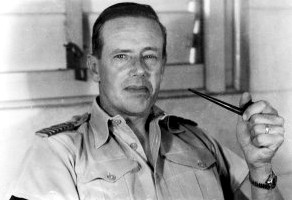
Group Captain Eaton (pictured in 1941), inaugural commander of No. 79 Wing

No. 79 Wing was established at Batchelor, Northern Territory, on 30 November 1943. Its combat units consisted of Nos. 1 and 2 Squadrons (flying Beaufort light reconnaissance bombers), No. 31 Squadron (Beaufighter long-range fighters), and No. 18 (Netherlands East Indies) Squadron (B-25 Mitchell medium bombers). The wing was commanded by Group Captain Charles Eaton, whose Dutch personnel called him "Oom Charles" (Uncle Charles). Operating under the auspices of North-Western Area Command (NWA), Darwin, No. 79 Wing participated in the New Guinea and North-Western Area Campaigns during 1944.

Through March–April 1944, the Beaufighters attacked Japanese shipping, while the Mitchells and Beauforts bombed Timor on a daily basis as a prelude to Operations Reckless and Persecution, the invasions of Hollandia and Aitape. Eaton organised a large raid against Su, Dutch Timor, on 19 April. Consisting of thirty-five Mitchells, Beauforts and Beaufighters, the force destroyed the town's barracks and fuel dumps, a result that earned the personal congratulations of the Air Officer Commanding NWA, Air Vice Marshal "King" Cole. On the day of the Allied landings, 22 April, the Mitchells and Beaufighters made a daylight raid on Dili, Portuguese Timor. The ground assault on Hollandia–Aitape met little opposition, credited in part to the air bombardment leading up to it.

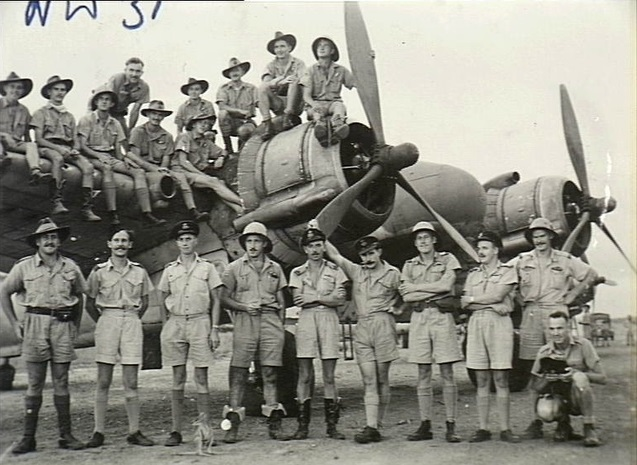
Aircrew and Beaufighter of No. 31 Squadron in the Northern Territory, January 1943

In May 1944, Nos. 1, 18 and 31 Squadrons attacked Japanese positions in Timor, while No. 2 Squadron was withdrawn from combat to re-equip with Mitchells. No. 79 Wing's light and medium bombers suffered from a lack of suitable targets as they had few airfields in forward areas from which to refuel. No. 2 Squadron returned to operations with Mitchells in June. That month, No. 18 Squadron flew 149 sorties, damaging Japanese airfields and shipping in the Timor area, but lost its commanding officer to anti-aircraft fire during a raid.

In June–July 1944, No. 79 Wing supported the Allied attack on Noemfoor. No. 18 Squadron was again the wing's most active unit, flying 107 sorties. In September, the Beaufighters and Mitchells attacked Japanese shipping and infrastructure in Ceram and Celebes, but lost nine aircraft and twenty-six crewmen killed, among them Squadron Leader Wilbur Wackett, son of Commonwealth Aircraft Corporation manager Lawrence Wackett. By the end of the month, Mitchell missions were put on hold while replacement crews were trained. In late 1944, plans were made to transfer No. 79 Wing from North-Western Area Command to Northern Command in Papua New Guinea, where it would undertake operations against the Japanese in New Britain. The wing's composition for this move was to be Nos. 2 and 18 Squadrons, operating Mitchells, and 120 (Netherlands East Indies) Squadron, operating P-40 Kittyhawks. No. 31 Squadron was transferred from No. 79 Wing to the Australian First Tactical Air Force at Morotai in December. The same month, Group Captain Eaton posted out and was replaced by Group Captain John Ryland.

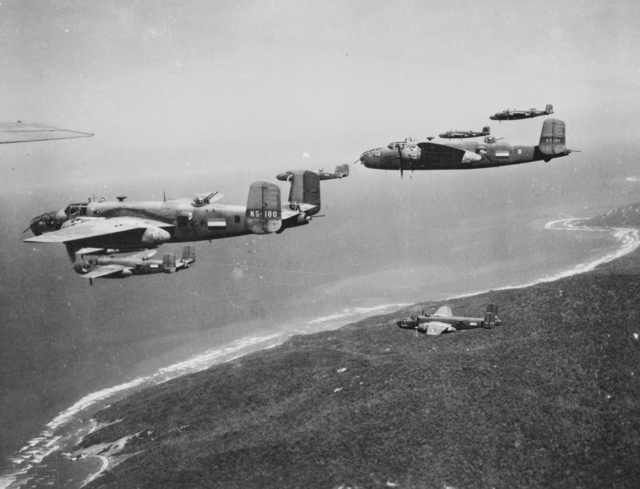
B-25 Mitchell bombers of No. 18 (NEI) Squadron in formation near Darwin, c. 1943

Weather hampered the wing's activities in January 1945. No. 1 Squadron was withdrawn to Queensland to re-equip with Mosquitos, with No. 13 Squadron, flying Venturas, taking up the slack on anti-shipping missions. The squadron accounted for around half of the thirty-eight enemy vessels sunk by No. 79 Wing in February, and a similar ratio to the twenty sunk the following month. Wing operations were cut back in March, as preparations were made to transfer the Mitchells to Jacquinot Bay in New Britain. On 6 April, all twenty available aircraft of Nos. 2 and 18 Squadrons were ordered to join B-24 Liberators of No. 82 Wing in an assault on a Japanese convoy that included the cruiser Isuzu. The Liberators were late for their rendezvous with the Mitchells off Sumba so the latter, at the very limit of their range, attacked the convoy regardless. They claimed two direct hits without loss, despite anti-aircraft fire from the cruiser and other ships, and frontal attacks by enemy fighters. Allied submarines sank the damaged Isuzu the next day.

The wing's proposed move to New Britain was cancelled in May 1945, after the Netherlands government requested that its squadrons operate over the Dutch East Indies. No. 120 Squadron was transferred to Biak, while No. 79 Wing and its two Mitchell squadrons were ordered to move to Borneo, under the command of First Tactical Air Force. By July, No. 79 Wing had relocated from Batchelor to Balikpapan, leaving No. 13 Squadron under the control of North-Western Area Command. After the Pacific War ended in August 1945, the Mitchells joined Liberators of No. 82 Wing repatriating RAAF personnel from Borneo to Australia. No. 79 Wing Headquarters was disbanded on 8 October. The following month, No. 18 Squadron was reassigned to the Netherlands Air Force. No. 2 Squadron returned to Australia in December, disbanding in mid-1946. These were the only two squadrons in the RAAF to operate Mitchells during the war.
