= Freddie Sowrey =

Sir Freddie Sowrey
- Born: 14 September 1922
- Died: 24 July 2019 (aged 96)
- Relatives: Group Captain Frederick Sowrey (father)
- Military career
- Allegiance: United Kingdom
- Branch: Royal Air Force
- Service years: 1941–1980
- Rank: Air Marshal
- Nickname: Freddie
- Service number: 107942
- Unit: No. 26 Squadron RAF
- Commands: RAF Training; National Defence College; RAF Abingdon; No. 46 Squadron RAF; No. 615 Squadron RAF
- Conflicts: Second World War
- Awards: Knight Commander of the Order of the Bath; Commander of the Order of the British Empire; Air Force Cross

Air Marshal Sir Frederick Beresford Sowrey, KCB, CBE, AFC (14 September 1922 – 24 July 2019) was a senior Royal Air Force officer. He served as Director of Defence Policy at the Ministry of Defence from 1968 to 1970, and Commandant of the National Defence College from 1972 to 1975.

== Early life ==
Sowrey was born on 14 September 1922 to Group Captain Frederick Sowrey. He was educated at Charterhouse, a public school in Godalming, Surrey.

== RAF career ==
=== Second World War ===
Sowrey was commissioned into the Royal Air Force Volunteer Reserve General Duties Branch on 24 August 1941 as a pilot officer on probation (emergency). He was given the service number 107942. He received his pilot training in Canada, and joined No. 26 Squadron RAF in March 1942 flying P-51 Mustangs. On 20 August 1942, his commission was confirmed and he was promoted to flying officer (war substantive). From 1942 to 1944, he undertook aerial reconnaissance in the European theatre. On 20 August 1943, he was promoted to flight lieutenant (war substantive). After a posting to the Flying Instructors School in 1944, he then served with the First Allied Airborne Army in 1945.

=== Postwar service ===
Following the Second World War, Sowrey was granted a permanent commission in the Royal Air Force on 1 July 1946 as a flight lieutenant with seniority from 1 September 1945. From 1946 to 1948, he served in No. 615 (County of Surrey) Squadron, Royal Auxiliary Air Force. He attended the Fighter Gunnery School from 1949 to 1950. As part of the half-yearly promotions, he was promoted to squadron leader on 1 January 1951. He was appointed Officer Commanding No. 615 Squadron in 1951, was awarded the Air Force Cross in the 1954 New Year Honours, and attended RAF Staff College, Bracknell. Sowrey served in the Chiefs of Staff Secretariat between 1955 and 1958 and, as part of the half-yearly promotions, he was promoted to wing commander on 1 July 1956.

Sowrey served as Officer Commanding No. 46 Squadron RAF from 1958 to 1960, then as Personal Staff Officer to Air Chief Marshal Sir Thomas Pike, Chief of the Air Staff, from 1960 to 1962. He served as Commanding Officer of RAF Abingdon, Oxfordshire, for two years from 1962, and spent 1965 at the Imperial Defence College, receiving promotion to air commodore on 1 July 1965. Sowrey was appointed a Commander of the Order of the British Empire 1965 Queen's Birthday Honours.

Sowrey served as Senior Air Staff Officer Middle East Command (Aden) from 1966 to 1967, was appointed a Companion of the Order of the Bath in the 1968 New Year Honours, and served as Director of Defence Policy at the Ministry of Defence from 1968 to 1970. He was a Senior Air Staff Officer in RAF Training Command from 1970 to 1972, being appointed an acting air vice-marshal on 1 June 1970, and was promoted to that rank on 1 July 1971.

Sowrey served as Commandant of the National Defence College from November 1972 to 1975. In August 1975 he was appointed Director General of RAF Training, then served as the UK Representative at the Permanent Military Deputies Group CENTO (Central Treaty Organisation) from 1977 to 1979, originally with the acting rank of air marshal, before being promoted to that rank on 1 January 1978.

Sowrey was appointed a Knight Commander of the Order of the Bath in the 1978 New Year Honours, and retired from the Royal Air Force on 5 April 1980.

== Post-RAF career ==
After leaving the RAF, Sowrey was a research fellow at the International Institute for Strategic Studies from 1980 to 1981. He then became involved in a number of organisations. From 1981 to 1993 he was chairman, and afterwards president, of the Sussex Industrial Archaeology Society, and has been a member of the Board of Conservators of Ashdown Forest since 1984, and a trustee of both the Guild of Aviation Artists and Amberley Chalk Pits Museum since 1990. He served as chairman of the Victory Services Association from 1985 to 1989, and then as president from 1989 to 1993. He was also chairman of RAF Historical Society, which he helped establish in 1986, until appointed life vice president in 1996.

Sowrey was also a frequent entrant in the London to Brighton Veteran Car Run, driving a 1901 Darracq he bought in 1990 and restored himself.

== Personal life ==
In 1946, Sowrey married Anne Margaret Haviland (née Bunbury). She was the widow of Pilot Officer Richard Haviland, who had been killed in a flying accident in August 1940. Together, Sowrey and his wife had two children; one son and one daughter.

His death was announced on Facebook on 28 July 2019.
