= Sorey =

Sorey is an English surname. Notable people with the surname include:

- Gladys Camille Sorey (1913–2019), American singer and actress known professionally as Julie Gibson
- Jim Sorey (1936–2008), American football player
- Revie Sorey (born 1953), American football player
- Tyshawn Sorey (born 1980), American musician
- Xavian Sorey (born 2002), American football player
