= No. 19 Squadron RAF =

Air control squadron of the Royal Air Force

No. XIX Squadron RAF
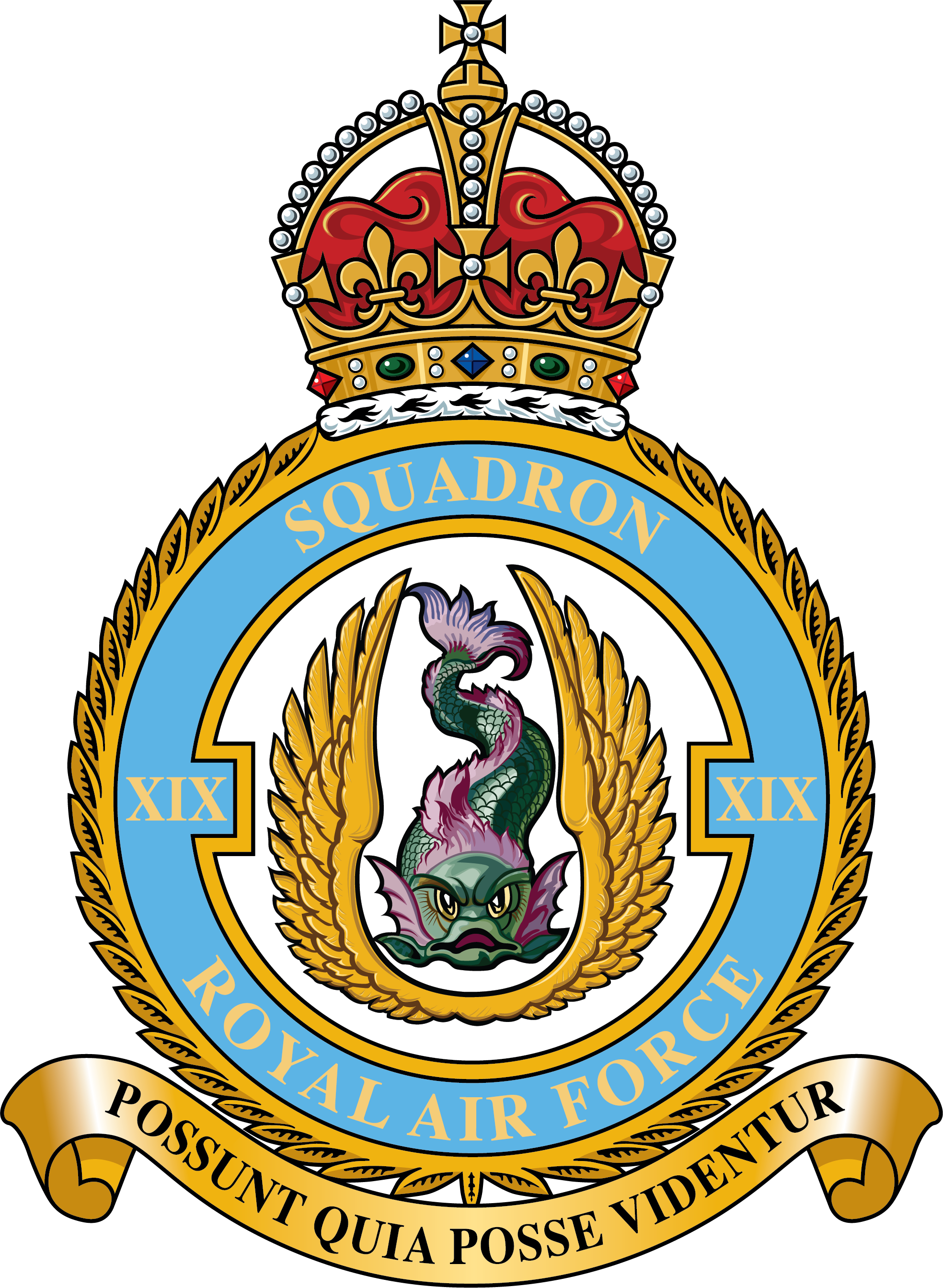
- Squadron badge
- Active: 1915–1918 (RFC); 1918–1919; 1923–1976; 1977–1992; 1992–2011; 2021–present
- Country: United Kingdom
- Branch: Royal Air Force
- Type: Non-flying squadron
- Role: Control and Reporting Centre
- Part of: Air Command and Control Force
- Station: RAF Boulmer
- Nicknames: The Chosen Squadron; The Dolphins
- Motto: Possunt quia posse videntur (Latin for 'They can because they think they can')
- Equipment: UK Air Surveillance Command and Control System

Insignia
- Roundel
- Tail codes: WZ (Oct 1938 – Sep 1939); QV (Sep 1939 – Sep 1945); A (1989–1991)

No. 19 Squadron, also known as No. XIX Squadron is a squadron of the Royal Air Force. It operates the UK's Control and Reporting Centre at RAF Boulmer, Northumberland. The squadron provides surveillance of UK airspace, and tactical command and control of RAF and NATO aircraft, including the UK's contribution to NATO's Quick Reaction Alert mission.

Formed on 1 September 1915 as a Royal Flying Corps squadron, it served during the First World War. It was the first squadron to operate the Supermarine Spitfire, which it flew for the majority of the Second World War. As No. 19 (Fighter) Squadron, it operated several aircraft types during the Cold War, including the Gloster Meteor F.4 and the McDonnell Douglas Phantom FGR.2. In 1992, it began flying the BAe Hawk from RAF Valley in Anglesey and was designated as No. 19 (Reserve) Squadron, before disbanding on 24 November 2011. It reformed to take on responsibility for the Control and Reporting Centre in 1 April 2021.

== History ==
=== First World War (1915–1918) ===
No. 19 Squadron of the Royal Flying Corps (RFC) was formed on 1 September 1915, from members of No. 5 Squadron, at Castle Bromwich, near Birmingham. It trained on a variety of aircraft before being deployed to France in July 1916, flying the Royal Aircraft Factory B.E.12 and later re-equipping with the more suitable French-built SPAD S.VII.

From November 1917, the squadron started to receive Sopwith Dolphins to replace its Spads, being fully equipped with the Dolphin by January 1918 and flying its first operational patrol with the new fighter on 3 February. By the end of the war, No. 19 Squadron had had twenty-two flying aces among its ranks, including Albert Desbrisay Carter, John Leacroft, Arthur Bradfield Fairclough, Oliver Bryson, Gordon Budd Irving, Frederick Sowrey, future Air Commodore Patrick Huskinson, Cecil Gardner, Roger Amedee Del'Haye, future Air Chief Marshal James Hardman, Finlay McQuistan, Alexander Pentland, John Candy, Cecil Thompson and John Aldridge.

Commanding officers during this time included H.D. Harvey-Kelly who was the first RFC pilot to land in France in the First World War. At least one No. 19 Squadron airman, a Canadian, George Robert Long, was captured on 6 October 1917 in the Lille area and spent the rest of the war in a number of prisoner of war camps, including Holzminden. It was his very first flight, in a Spad VII, when the squadron was operating from the asylum ground in Bailleul. He was shot down by Gefreiter J. Funk, flying with Ja30. He had first been a member of the Canadian Expeditionary Force in the infantry and was wounded a number of times. He wasn't repatriated until 14 December 1918, when he return home to Ottawa.

=== Interwar period (1919–1938) ===
No. 19 Squadron disbanded after the First World War on 31 December 1919. On 1 April 1923, the squadron reformed at RAF Duxford, Cambridgeshire, operating the Sopwith Snipe, initially as part of No. 2 Flying Training School (No. 2 FTS). After becoming independent of No. 2 FTS, the squadron remained at Duxford flying several fighters including the Gloster Grebe, Armstrong Whitworth Siskin Mk.IIIa and Bristol Bulldog Mk.IIa. In May 1935, it became the first squadron to be equipped with the Gloster Gauntlet, which it flew until March 1939.

In 1938, the squadron became the first in the RAF to operate the Supermarine Spitfire Mk.I, when K9789 was delivered on 4 August. The squadron lost its first Spitfire when K9792 crashed on landing at Duxford on 20 September 1938, having only been delivered on 16 August.

=== Second World War (1939–1945) ===
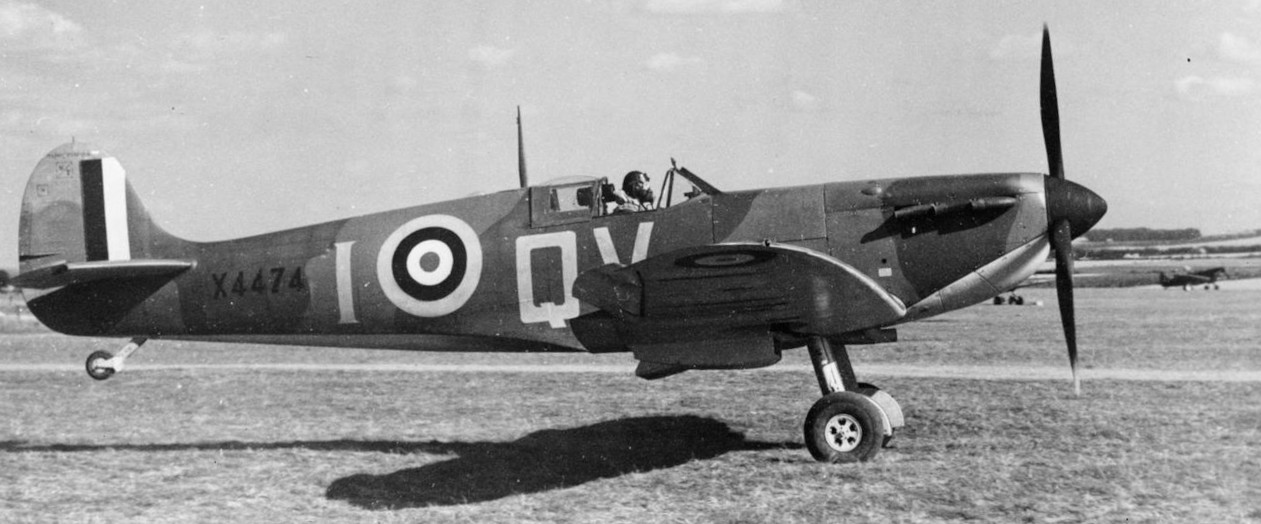
A Supermarine Spitfire Mk.I operated by No. 19 Squadron during 1940

At the outbreak of the Second World War in September 1939, No. 19 Squadron was still stationed at RAF Duxford and was part of No. 12 Group, RAF Fighter Command. Flying ace Douglas Bader was posted to the squadron in February 1940. In May and June 1940, the squadron provided air cover over the beaches of Dunkirk in France during the evacuation of allied forces.

In June 1940, the squadron began to the receive Spitfire Mk.Ib, which were armed with the Hispano cannon. However due to reliability issues, the unit soon reverted to the Spitfire Mk.Ia. The squadron formed part of the Duxford Wing, No. 12 Group's 'Big Wing' formation during the Battle of Britain.

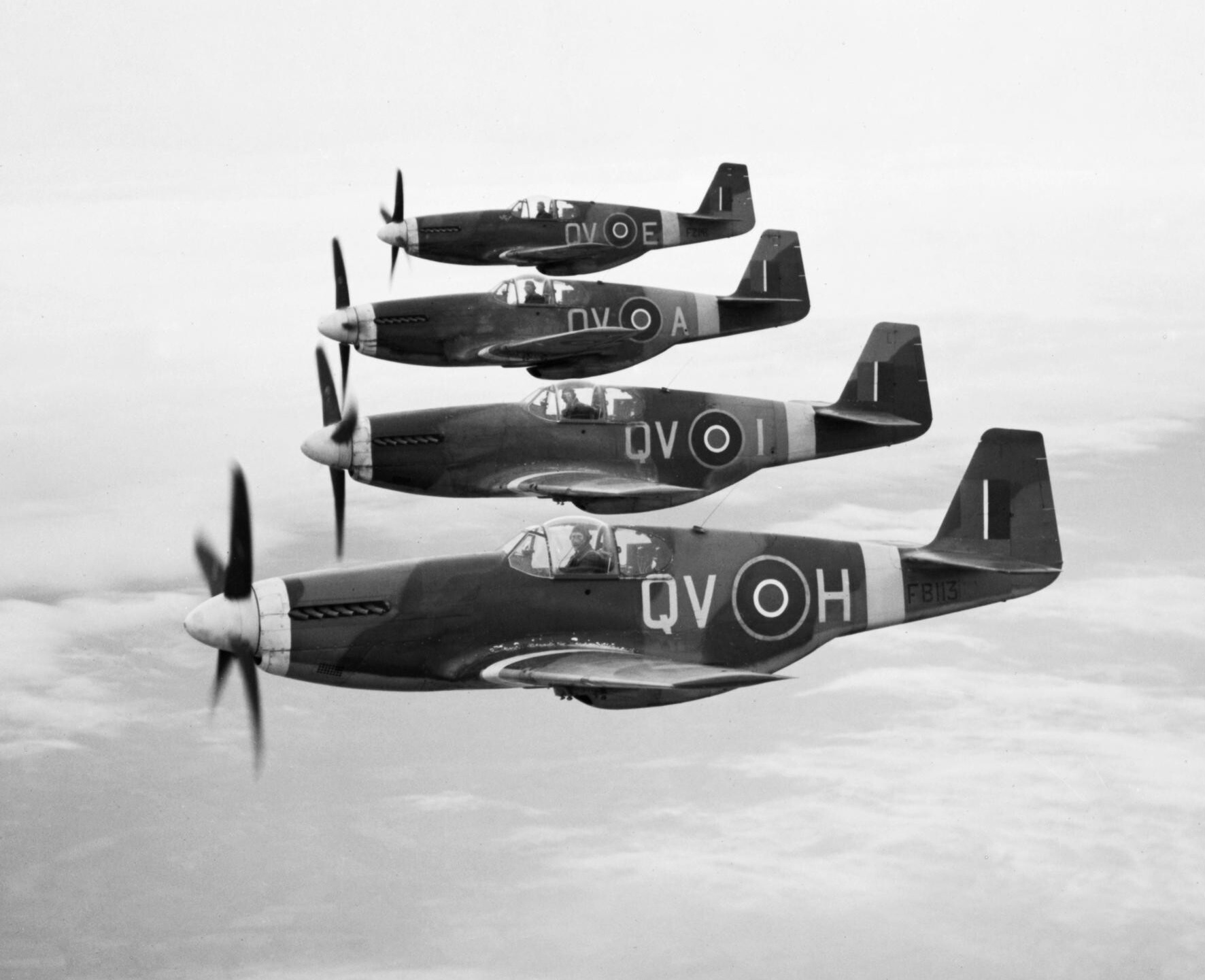
Four North American Mustang Mk.III of No. 19 Squadron during April 1944. The aircraft wear white identity markings on the nose and wings to prevent mis-identification as German Messerschmitt Me 109s.

Later versions of the Spitfire were flown until the arrival in early 1944 of the North American Mustang Mk.III for close-support duties After D-Day on 6 June 1944, the squadron briefly went across the English Channel before starting long-range escort duties off the coast of Norway from RAF Peterhead, Aberdeenshire, as part of RAF Coastal Command . The squadron converted to the Mustang Mk.IV in April 1945 while based at Peterhead.

Relocating south to RAF Acklington, Northumberland on 13 May 1945, the squadron exchanged its Mustangs for the Spitfire Mk.XVI.

=== Cold War (1946–early 1990s) ===
While at RAF Wittering, Cambridgeshire in October 1946, No. 19 (Fighter) Squadron converted to the de Havilland Hornet Mk.I which was operated until January 1951, when the squadron received its first jet aircraft – the Gloster Meteor F.4. The F.4 variant was soon exchanged for the Meteor F.8 in April 1951 which were flown until October 1956 when the squadron received the Hawker Hunter F.6 . The squadron moved to RAF Leconfield, Yorkshire in 1959, later converting to the English Electric Lightning F.2 in November 1962.

In September 1965, the squadron and her sister unit, No. 92 (F) Squadron, were forward deployed to RAF Gütersloh, close to the inner German border, as part of NATO's Second Allied Tactical Air Force. Subsequently, the squadron re-equipped with the longer-range Lightning F.2A.

No. 19 (F) Squadron disbanded on 31 December 1976, and reformed the next day at RAF Wildenrath, North Rhine-Westphalia, with the McDonnell Douglas Phantom FGR.2 still in the air defence role.

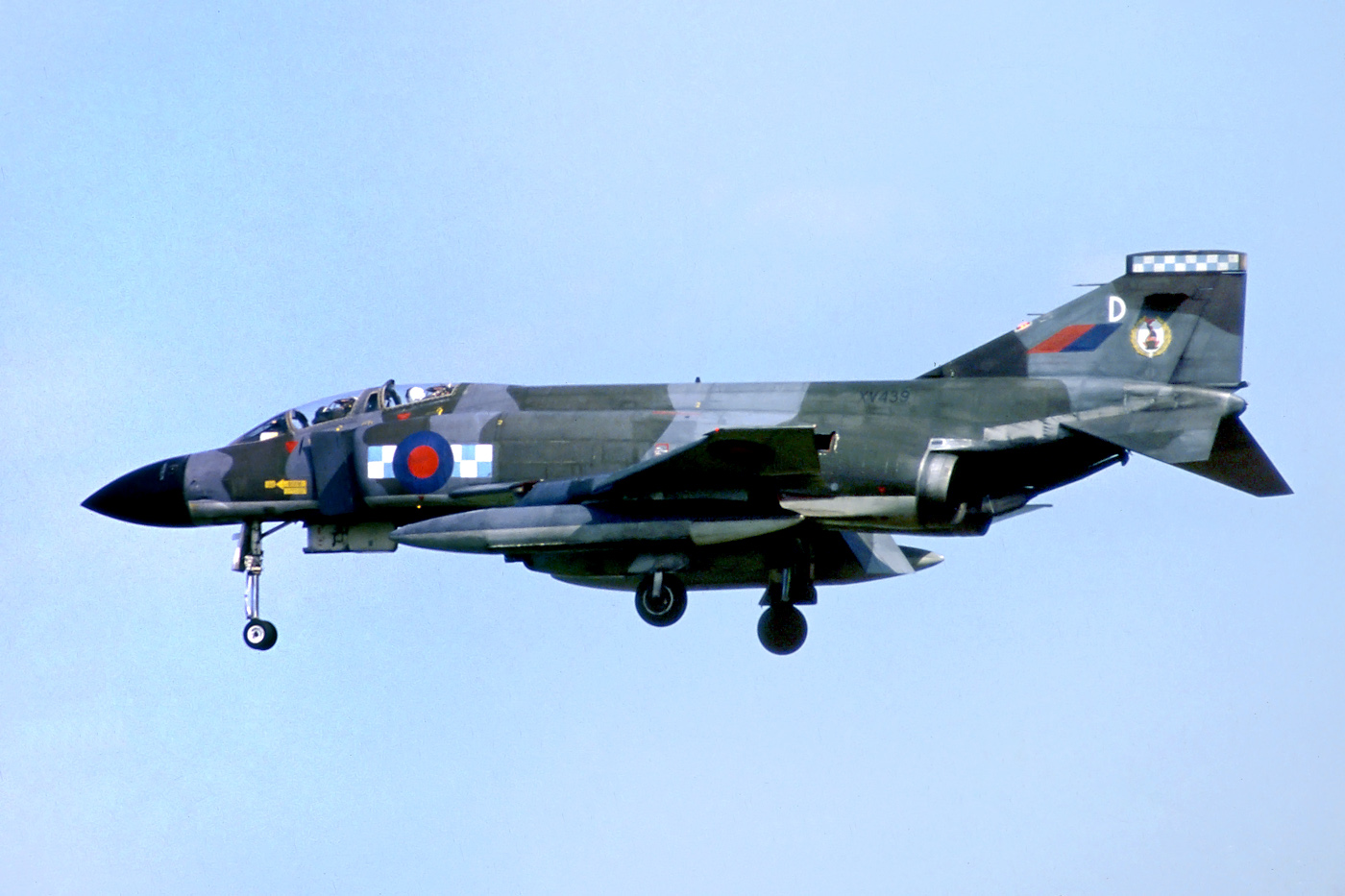
A No. 19 Squadron McDonnell Douglas Phantom FGR.2 on approach to RAF Wildenrath in July 1982

Because of restricted airspace in then West Germany, both No. 19 Squadron and No. 92 Squadron deployed regularly out of theatre for annual Missile Practice Camps at RAF Valley, using the Aberporth Range in Wales; to RAF St Mawgan in Cornwall; RAF Akrotiri in Cyprus for Armament Practice Camps (gunnery); to the Italian Air Force's Decimommanu Air Base in Sardinia to use the NATO Air Combat Manoeuvring Instrumented Range; and latterly to Eglin Air Force Base, Florida and Nellis Air Force Base, Nevada to participate respectively in multi national Exercise Green Flag and Exercise Red Flag.

On 17 August 1990, No. 19 (F) Squadron and No. 92 (F) Squadron, re-positioned to RAF Akrotiri to provide air defence for the island after No. 5 (AC) Squadron and No. 29 (F) Squadron, both operating the Panavia Tornado F.3, were deployed from Akrotiri to Dhahran Airfield in Saudi Arabia as part of the military build-up following the Iraqi Invasion of Kuwait (and ahead of Operation Granby. The squadron operated the Phantom from Akrotiri until 28 February 1991, when a ceasefire was agreed between the coalition forces and Iraq.

On 9 January 1992, the squadron disbanded as part of post-Cold War force reductions, with its aircraft being scrapped. The last Phantom departed on 16 January 1992, to be gifted to the Kbely Military Museum in Prague, piloted by RAF Wildenrath Station Commander Group Captain Geoff Brindle.

=== Hawk (1992–2011) ===
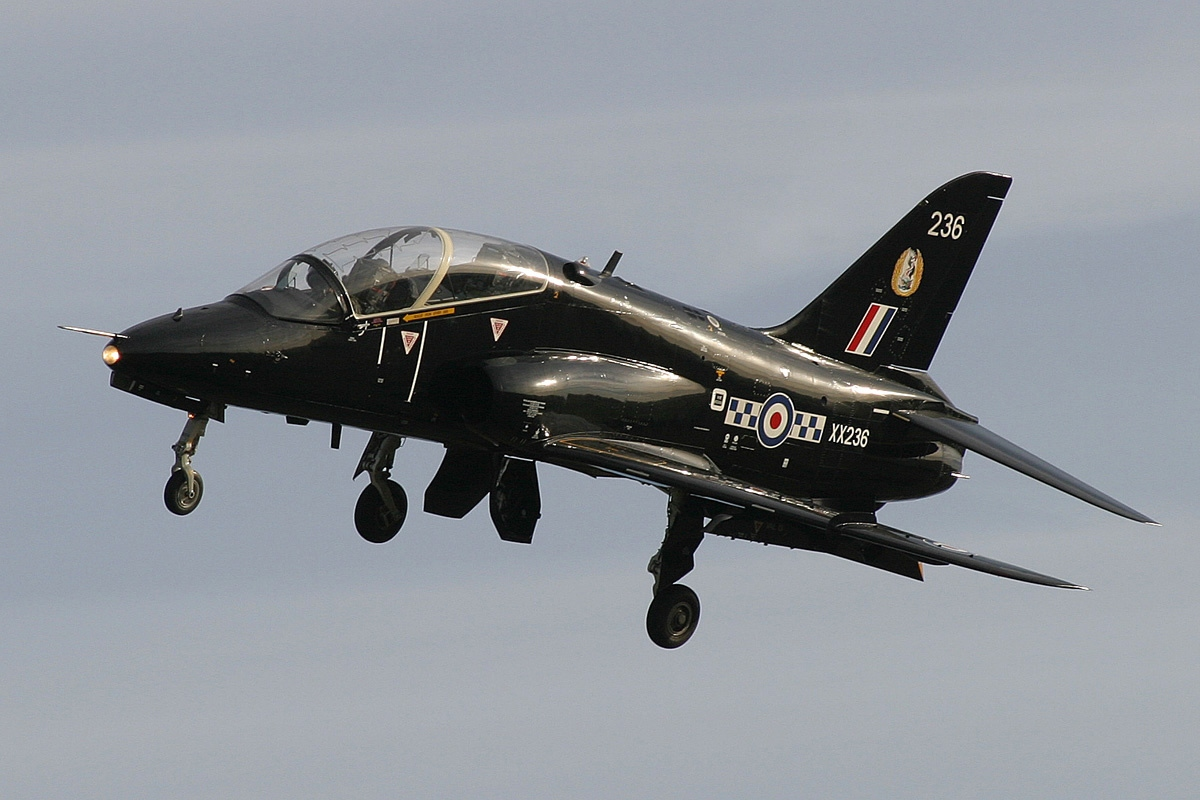
A BAE Hawk T1W of No. 19 Squadron in 2005

In September 1992, the No. 19 Squadron number plate was assigned to the former No. 63 Squadron, a BAE Hawk squadron at RAF Chivenor, Devon, becoming No. 19 (Reserve) Squadron. The squadron was a 'shadow' identity of No. 2 Tactical Weapons Unit. Following the closure of Chivenor to jet flying, the squadron was moved to RAF Valley in September 1994 to provide advanced fast jet training on the Hawk.

As a consequence of the UK's Strategic Defence and Security Review in 2010, the Air Force Board decided in 2011 that No. 19 Squadron's training role with the Hawk T2 at Valley should be transferred to a resurrected No. 4 (R) Squadron. No. 19(R) Squadron, one of the last surviving Battle of Britain squadrons, disbanded on 24 November 2011, 96 years after it was first formed.

The disbandment event, held at RAF Valley, was led by Officer Commanding No. 19 Squadron, Wing Commander Kevin Marsh. In attendance were the Chief of Air Staff, Air Chief Marshal Stephen Dalton, Air Chief Marshal William Wratten and Flight Lieutenant Ken Wilkinson – a No. 19 Squadron Spitfire pilot who flew during the Battle of Britain.

=== Control and Reporting Centre (2021 – present) ===
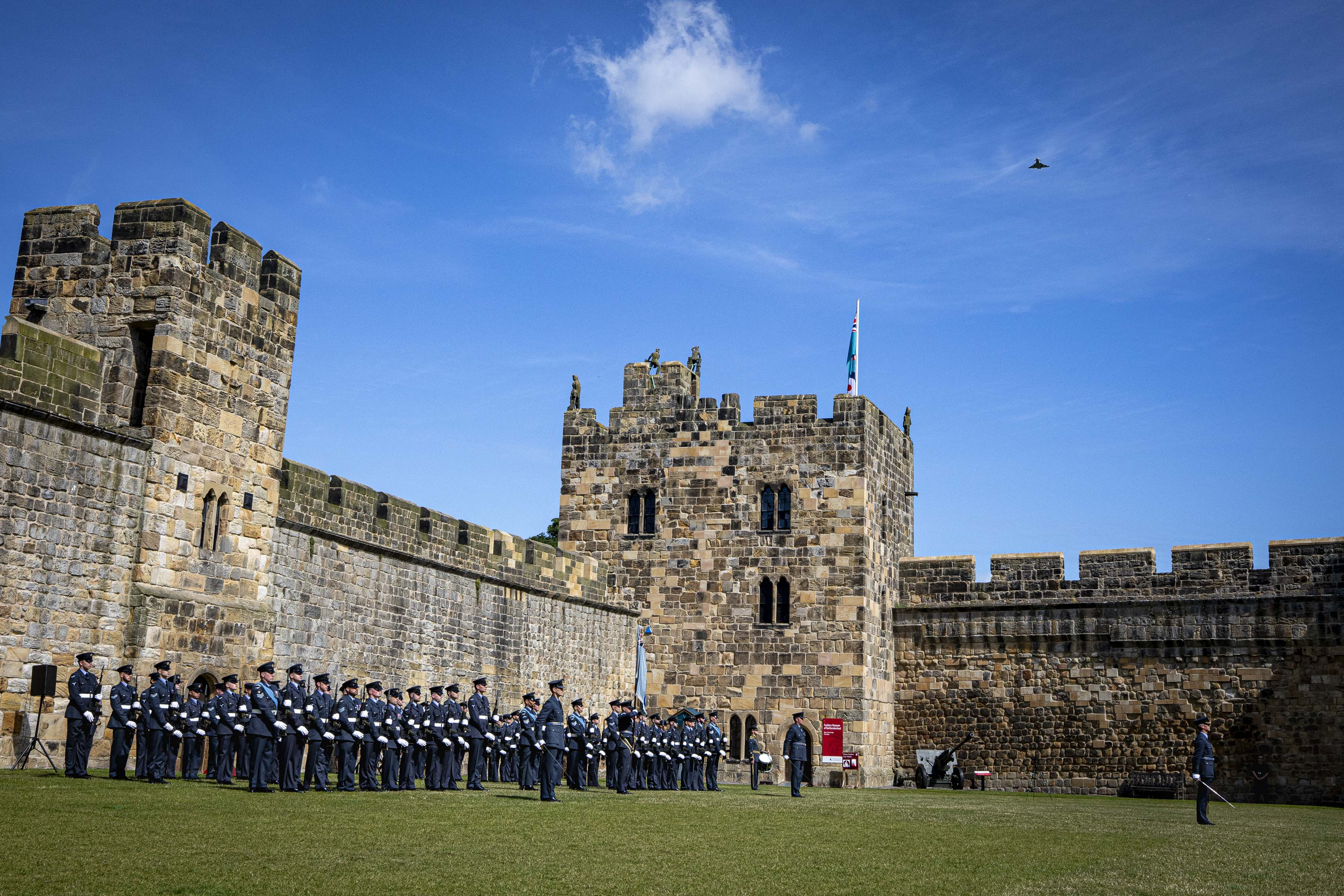
No. 19 Squadron and No. 20 Squadron held a reformation parade at Alnwick Castle on 15 June 2021

On 1 April 2021, the RAF awarded the No. 19 Squadron number plate to the Control and Reporting Centre (CRC) based at RAF Boulmer in Northumberland. The squadron's reformation was celebrated officially at a joint reformation parade with No. 20 Squadron on 15 June 2022, which was held at Alnwick Castle.

The No. 19 Squadron CRC operates the UK Air Surveillance and Control System (ASACS), which is used to monitor all aerial activity in UK airspace, detecting and identifying aerial threats, and building a recognised air picture for defence and national security purposes. The CRC also supports the RAF's Quick Reaction Alert mission, which has Eurofighter Typhoon FGR4 aircraft on standby to launch and intercept any threats. The system uses a combination of fixed and mobile ground based radars, aircraft, and command and control facilities at Boulmer.

== Aircraft operated ==
List of aircraft operated by No. 19 Squadron:

- Farman MF.11 Shorthorn (September 1915–October 1915)
- Avro 504 (September 1915–October 1915)
- Caudron G.3 (September 1915–October 1915)
- Royal Aircraft Factory B.E.2c (October 1915–December 1915)
- Royal Aircraft Factory R.E.7 (December 1915)
- Avro 504 (February 1916–July 1916)
- Caudron G.3 (February 1916–July 1916)
- Bristol Scout (February 1916–July 1916)
- Martinsyde S.1 (February 1916–July 1916)
- Royal Aircraft Factory B.E.2c (February 1916–July 1916)
- Royal Aircraft Factory F.E.2b (February 1916–July 1916)
- Royal Aircraft Factory R.E.5 (February 1916–July 1916)
- Royal Aircraft Factory R.E.7 (February 1916–July 1916)
- Royal Aircraft Factory B.E.12 (June 1916–February 1917)
- SPAD S.VII (October 1916–January 1918)
- SPAD S.XIII (June 1719–January 1918)
- Sopwith Dolphin (November 1917–February 1919)
- Sopwith Snipe (April 1923–December 1924)
- Gloster Grebe (December 1924–April 1928)
- Armstrong Whitworth Siskin Mk.IIIa (March 1928–September 1931)
- Bristol Bulldog Mk.IIa (September 1931–January 1935)
- Gloster Gauntlet Mk.I (January 1935–March 1939)
- Gloster Gauntlet Mk.II (September 1936–February 1939)
- Supermarine Spitfire Mk.I (August 1938–December 1940)
- Supermarine Spitfire Mk.Ib (June 1940–September 1940)
- Supermarine Spitfire Mk.IIb (September 1940–November 1941)
- Supermarine Spitfire Mk.Vb (October 1941–August 1943)
- Supermarine Spitfire Mk. Vc (September 1942–March 1943)
- Supermarine Spitfire Mk.IX (August 1943–January 1944)
- North American Mustang Mk.III (January 1944–April 1945)
- North American Mustang Mk.IV (April 1945–March 1946)
- Supermarine Spitfire LF.16e (March 1946–November 1946)
- de Havilland Hornet F.1 (October 1946–May 1948)
- de Havilland Hornet F.3 (March 1948–January 1951)
- Gloster Meteor F.4 (January 1951–June 1951)
- Gloster Meteor F.8 (April 1951–January 1957)
- Hawker Hunter F.6 (October 1956–February 1963)
- English Electric Lightning F.2 (November 1962–October 1969)
- English Electric Lightning F.2a (January 1968–December 1976)
- McDonnell Douglas Phantom FGR.2 (January 1977–January 1992)
- British Aerospace Hawk T1 and T2 (September 1992–November 2011)

== Heritage ==
The squadron's badge features between wings elevated and conjoined in base, a dolphin, head downwards.

The squadron's motto is Possunt quia posse videntur (Latin for 'They can because they think they can').

== Battle honours ==
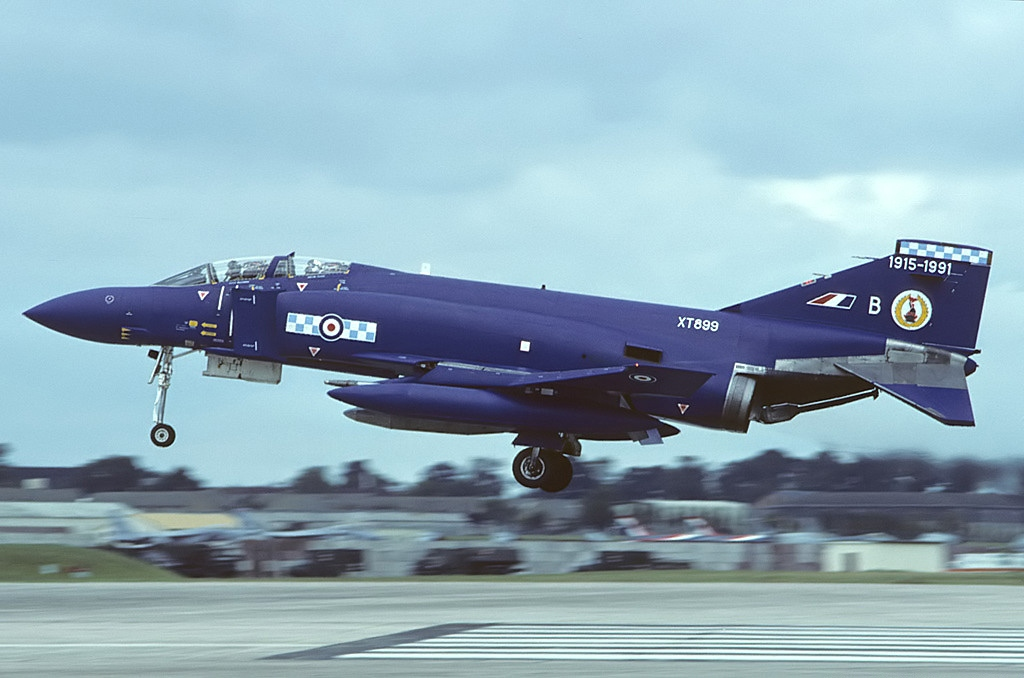
McDonnell Douglas Phantom FGR.2 XT899 of No. 19 (F) Squadron wearing an overall blue scheme arriving at RIAT, July 1991. This aircraft is now on display at the Kbely museum in Prague.

No. 19 Squadron has received the following battle honours. Those marked with an asterisk (*) may be emblazoned on the squadron standard.

- Western Front (1916–1918)*
- Somme (1916)*
- Arras (1916)*
- Ypres (1917)*
- Somme (1918)
- Lys (1918)
- Amiens (1918)
- Hindenburg Line (1918)
- Dunkirk (1918)*
- Home Defence (1940–1942)
- Battle of Britain (1940)*
- Channel and North Sea (1942)
- Fortress Europe (1942–1944)*
- Dieppe (1942–1944)*
- Normandy (1944)*
- Arnhem (1944)
- France & Germany (1944–1945)

== See also ==
- List of Royal Air Force aircraft squadrons
