= Jerry Pentland =

Australian fighter ace (1894–1983)

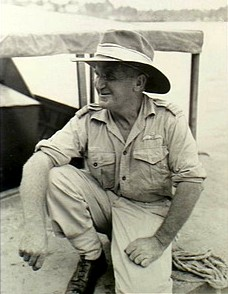
- Squadron Leader Pentland in New Guinea, c. 1943
- Born: 5 August 1894; Maitland, New South Wales
- Died: 3 November 1983 (aged 89); Collaroy, New South Wales
- Military career
- Allegiance: Australia
- Branch: Australian Imperial Force (1915–1916); Royal Flying Corps (1916–1918); Royal Air Force (1918, 1923–1926); Royal Australian Air Force (1921–1923, 1940–1945)
- Service years: 1915–1918; 1921–1926; 1940–1945
- Rank: Squadron Leader
- Units: 12th Light Horse (1915–1916); No. 19 Squadron RFC (1916–1917); No. 87 Squadron RAF (1918)
- Commands: No. 1 Rescue and Communication Flight (1942–1943)
- Conflicts: World War I World War II
- Awards: Military Cross; Distinguished Flying Cross; Air Force Cross
- Other work: Businessman; Commercial pilot and instructor

Alexander Augustus Norman Dudley "Jerry" Pentland, MC, DFC, AFC (5 August 1894 – 3 November 1983) was an Australian fighter ace in World War I.

Born in Maitland, New South Wales, Pentland commenced service as a Lighthorseman with the Australian Imperial Force in 1915, and saw action at Gallipoli. He transferred to the Royal Flying Corps the following year, rising to captain. Credited with twenty-three aerial victories, Pentland became the fifth-highest-scoring Australian ace of the war, after Robert Little, Stan Dallas, Harry Cobby and Roy King. He was awarded the Military Cross in January 1918 for "conspicuous gallantry and devotion to duty" on a mission attacking an aerodrome behind enemy lines, and the Distinguished Flying Cross that August for engaging four hostile aircraft single-handedly.

Pentland served in the fledgling Royal Australian Air Force (RAAF), and later the Royal Air Force, before going into business in 1927. His ventures included commercial flying around the goldfields of New Guinea, aircraft design and manufacture, flight instruction and charter work. In the early 1930s, he was employed as a pilot with Australian National Airways, and also spent time as a dairy farmer. Soon after the outbreak of World War II, he re-enlisted in the RAAF, attaining the rank of squadron leader and commanding rescue and communications units in the South West Pacific. Perhaps the oldest operational pilot in the wartime RAAF, Pentland was responsible for rescuing airmen, soldiers and civilians, and earned the Air Force Cross for his "outstanding courage, initiative and skill". He became a trader in New Guinea when the war ended in 1945, and later a coffee planter. Retiring in 1959, he died in 1983 at the age of eighty-nine.

== Early life ==
Alexander Augustus Norman Dudley Pentland was born in Maitland, New South Wales, on 5 August 1894. His father Alexander was Irish, and his mother Annie Norma (née Farquhar) was Scottish. Educated at The King's School, Sydney, and Brighton Grammar, Melbourne, Pentland went on to study dairy farming at Hawkesbury Agricultural College, and later worked as a jackaroo. His father was a physician who joined the Australian Imperial Force (AIF) during World War I and served as a major in the Australian Army Medical Corps.

== World War I ==
Pentland enlisted as a private in the AIF on 5 March 1915, sailing for Egypt with the 12th Light Horse Regiment aboard HMAT A29 Suevic on 13 June. In August, his unit deployed to Gallipoli, where he fought as a machine gunner before being hospitalised the following month, suffering from typhoid fever; he was evacuated to England in December. Determined to leave the trenches behind after recovering, he volunteered for the Royal Flying Corps (RFC) and was discharged from the AIF on 21 February 1916 to take up his commission as a temporary second lieutenant in the RFC. His first solo flight in a Maurice Farman Longhorn at Brooklands, after two hours of dual instruction, ended with him overshooting the runway and crashing in a sewage farm, but he was unhurt and immediately undertook a second solo attempt, landing successfully. It was at Brooklands that he was first nicknamed "Jerry". After completing pilot training, he was posted to France in June, flying B.E.2s with No. 16 Squadron. Though the slow and vulnerable B.E.2 was considered "Fokker fodder" by its crews, Pentland and his observer quickly managed to score the former's first aerial victory, bringing down a German Eindecker over Habourdin on 9 June. He was then posted to No. 29 Squadron and was converting to DH.2 "pusher" fighters when he broke his leg playing rugby. After recovering, he instructed at London Colney until June 1917, when he joined No. 19 Squadron, flying SPAD S.VIIs. This would become Pentland's favourite type due to its strength and manoeuvrability, even though it had to be 'flown' constantly and was unforgiving at low speed.

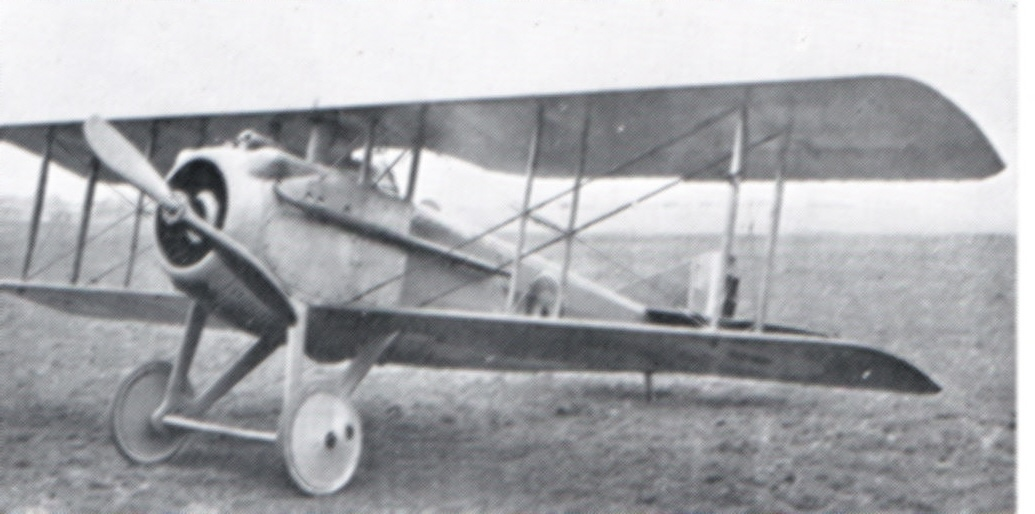
SPAD S.VII of the Royal Flying Corps

On 20 July 1917, soon after arriving at his new unit in France, Pentland achieved his first victory in the SPAD when he shared in the destruction of an Albatros two-seater. He followed this up with a solo "kill" on 12 August. Four days later, after stopping an enemy truck convoy in its tracks by crippling its lead vehicle with machine-gun fire, he reportedly engaged ten Albatros fighters single-handedly; by the time he had driven them off, four bullets had penetrated his leather flying suit without injuring him, and his plane had absorbed so much punishment that it had to be scrapped when he got back to base. After sharing another Albatros two-seater on 20 August, Pentland led a raid on Marcke aerodrome, home of Baron von Richthofen's Jasta 11, on 26 August. On the way, he helped bring down a DFW C.V, then achieved complete surprise at the airfield, which he and his flight proceeded to shoot up. On the return journey, he strafed an enemy train until his guns jammed and then, having managed to clear them, engaged two more German scouts. His part in the raid earned him the Military Cross, promulgated in The London Gazette on 9 January 1918:

For conspicuous gallantry and devotion to duty. On a recent occasion he flew to an aerodrome fifteen miles behind the enemy lines, descended to within twenty feet of the ground, and fired into eight hostile machines. On his return journey he attacked a train with considerable effect from a low altitude. He has in addition brought down several enemy machines, and has always set a splendid example of fearlessness and devotion to duty in attacking enemy balloons and troops on the ground.

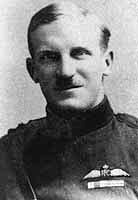
Captain Pentland, c. 1918

Credited with one more victory during August 1917, and another four the following month, Pentland's score stood at ten when he was injured on 26 September after an artillery shell struck his SPAD and forced him to crash land. Following his recovery, he again spent time instructing before being posted back to a front-line unit, this time No. 87 Squadron, operating Sopwith Dolphins. Promoted captain, he returned to France in April 1918, having transferred the same month with the rest of the RFC to the newly formed Royal Air Force (RAF). Pentland went on to achieve thirteen victories with No. 87 Squadron, where his aggressive tactics saw him dubbed the "Wild Australian" by colleagues. Appointed commander of 'B' Flight, he also frequently acted as a "lone wolf", actively seeking dogfights with enemy aircraft on his own. On 18 June, he was alone on patrol when he engaged a flight of four Rumpler high-altitude reconnaissance aircraft, forcing down three of them. This action earned him the Distinguished Flying Cross, gazetted on 3 August:

A gallant flight commander, who in the last three months has destroyed two enemy machines and driven down four out of control. Recently, whilst on special patrol, he, single-handed, attacked four enemy aeroplanes; having driven down one out of control, he engaged the leader, damaged his engine, and compelled him to glide to his lines. One of the remaining machines followed the leader, but he attacked the other and drove it down in a steep dive.

On 25 August, Pentland attacked and destroyed two German planes, a DFW two-seater and Fokker D.VII, before himself being shot down and wounded in the foot. These would be his last victories; his grand total of twenty-three included eleven destroyed, one of which was shared, and twelve out of control, three of them shared. This score ranked him fifth among the Australian aces of the war after Robert Little, Stan Dallas, Harry Cobby and Roy King.

== Interwar period ==
Pentland relinquished his RAF commission and returned to Australia at the end of the war, earning money by giving joyrides in an Avro 504K. Looking for a more secure future, he joined the newly established Royal Australian Air Force (RAAF) in August 1921, following an interview with Wing Commander Stanley Goble, a wartime acquaintance through the RAF. Ranked flight lieutenant, Pentland was put in charge of the RAAF's complement of S.E.5 fighters at Point Cook, Victoria, part of the Imperial Gift recently donated by Great Britain. The young Air Force had the atmosphere of a flying club, where everyone knew everyone else. Tensions sometimes arose between those who had served with British forces during the war, and those who had belonged to the Australian Flying Corps (AFC); the former considered that they were discriminated against when it came to filling senior positions, and came the day Pentland and fellow ex-RAF member Hippolyte De La Rue threw an "uppity" AFC man into a mess fireplace. Deciding that his RAAF career was not progressing, Pentland applied for a short-service commission as a flying officer with the RAF in 1923, which was granted as of 23 April. He journeyed to Britain with new wife Madge (née Moffat), whom he married on 5 March, just before departing Australia; they had one daughter, Carleen, the following year. Pentland completed the course at Central Flying School, Uphavon, and became an instructor there, gaining promotion to flight lieutenant before leaving the RAF on 20 July 1926 and returning to Australia.

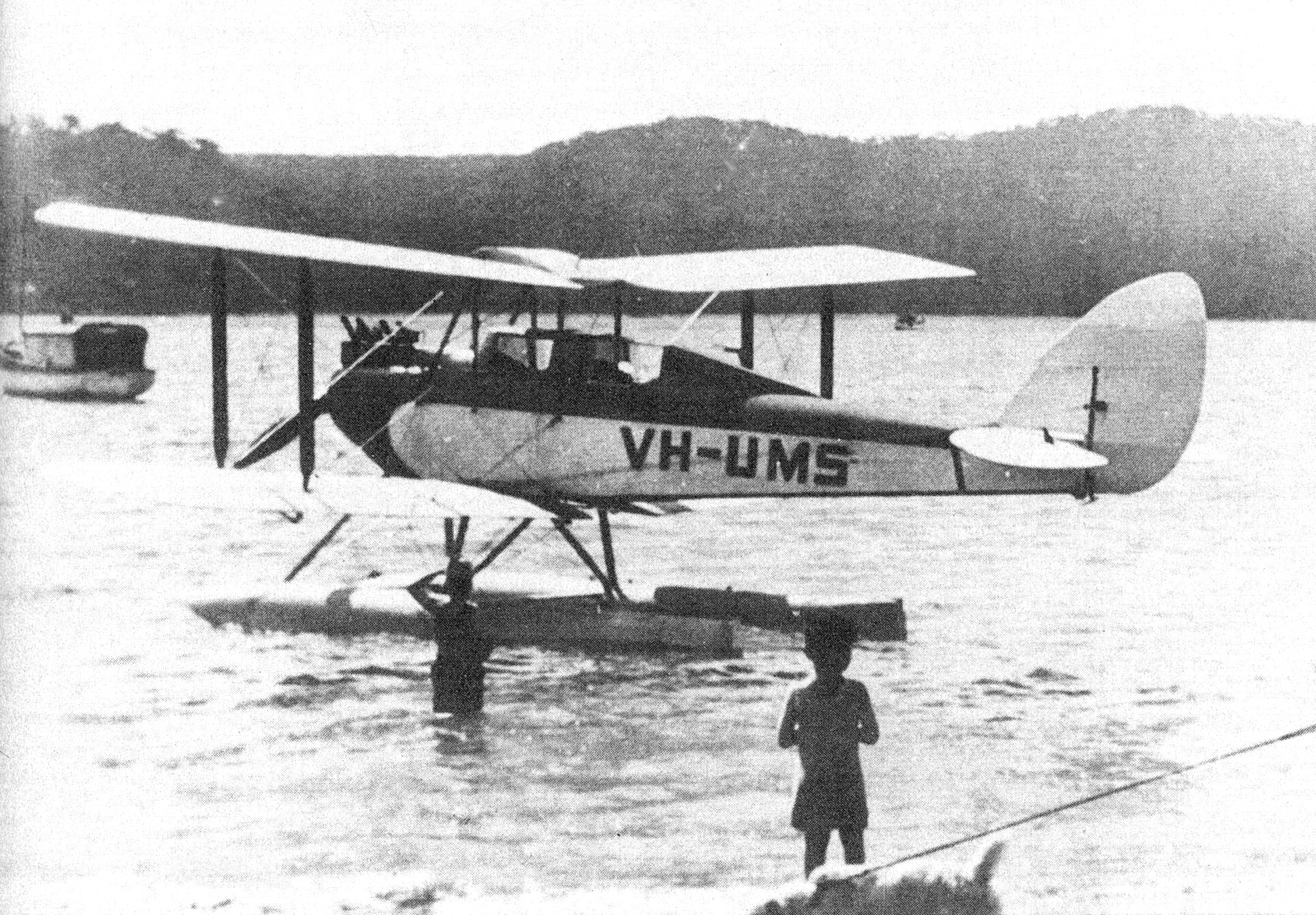
One of the DH.60 Moths operated by Jerry Pentland between the wars, c. 1929

In 1927, Pentland formed Mandated Territory Airways with entrepreneur Albert Royal to fly freight to and from the goldfields of New Guinea. The pair bought a DH.60 Moth biplane, which Pentland ferried to the firm's base at Lae in February 1928. The business prospered in the short term, to the extent that the partners took on another Moth and more pilots. By the end of the year, Pentland was suffering from malaria and had to abandon the venture, selling one of the planes to Guinea Airways and returning to Australia with the other. After recovering in the new year, he embarked on a series of new enterprises, including aircraft manufacture, a flying school and charter work. In February 1929, he formed the General Aircraft Company with Royal and another partner to produce an Australian-designed aeroplane, the Genairco, of which eight were eventually sold. With the Moth from Mandated Territory Airways, he established Pentland's Flying School at Mascot, New South Wales. He also flew charters with a Moth owned by The Sun newspaper, using the same aircraft that September to compete in the East-West Air Race from Sydney to Perth, as part of the celebrations for the Western Australia Centenary. The event attracted several veteran aviators of World War I, including Horrie Miller—the eventual winner on handicap—and Charles "Moth" Eaton, whom Pentland beat into fifth place across the line.

Lack of patronage led to Pentland folding his businesses and taking a job in 1930 as a pilot with Australian National Airways (ANA), a new airline founded by Charles Kingsford Smith and Charles Ulm. By 1932, ANA was in trouble as well, and Pentland left to set up as a dairy farmer on a property he bought at Singleton. Within two years, drought forced him to sell the land and he returned to earning his living as a pilot, instructing at aero clubs in Queensland and New South Wales. By late 1937, he was again employed as a transport pilot in New Guinea, where he was known as a practical joker who liked to hold a map in front of his face in apparent short-sightedness and ask his passengers if they could see a landing ground anywhere. He returned to Australia after war was declared in September 1939.

== World War II ==
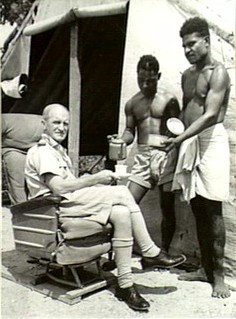
Squadron Leader Pentland in New Guinea, August 1943

Having offered his services to the Australian government on his return from New Guinea, Pentland rejoined the RAAF on 17 June 1940. He undertook the flying instructors' course at Central Flying School in Camden, New South Wales, and was posted as an instructor to elementary flying training schools in eastern Australia, including Brisbane, Tamworth, Temora, Bundaberg and Lowood. Addressed by a young pilot at one school as "Pop", Pentland responded in front of the large audience, "I'm sorry son, but I don't remember sleeping with your mother". He was promoted to flight lieutenant in October 1941, and joined No. 1 Communication Flight in June 1942. Based in Victoria at Laverton and, later, Essendon, it was primarily engaged in army and naval cooperation, and operated as far afield as the Northern Territory and New Guinea.

Promoted to squadron leader, in November 1942 Pentland was posted to Port Moresby, New Guinea, as commanding officer (CO) of No. 1 Rescue and Communication Squadron, better known as "Pentland's Flying Circus". The official history of Australia in the war described this as the RAAF's "most unusual operational unit", asserting that its "strange assortment of light aircraft was as varied and as appropriate to its task as was the flying record of its commander ...". Its inventory included such types as the de Havilland Tiger Moth, DH.84 Dragon, Fox Moth, Dragon Rapide and Avro Anson. Perhaps the RAAF's oldest pilot in any theatre of operations, Pentland was responsible for the rescue of downed US airmen, as well as the evacuation of civilians and soldiers. He also organised aerial surveys around Daru and Milne Bay, developing new bases and emergency airfields at locales such as Bena Bena, Abau, Kulpi and Port Moresby.

Posted back to Australia after relinquishing command of No. 1 Rescue and Communication Squadron in June 1943, Pentland received radar training and helped to set up the RAAF's early warning grid in northern Australia. He returned to New Guinea in March 1944 as CO of No. 8 Communication Unit, Goodenough Island, which had been formed in November 1943 from Pentland's old Rescue and Communications Squadron. Operating Tiger Moth, Supermarine Walrus, Consolidated PBY Catalina, Dornier Do 24, Bristol Beaufort, CAC Boomerang, Bristol Beaufighter and Vultee Vengeance aircraft, the unit performed reconnaissance and bombing sorties over New Britain and north-eastern New Guinea, as well as rescue and survey missions. In July 1945, Pentland was posted to Mascot as CO of No. 3 Communication Unit, serving until September. His achievements in New Guinea earned him the Air Force Cross, the citation being promulgated on 22 February 1946 and concluding:

Squadron Leader PENTLAND has, at all times, displayed outstanding courage, initiative and skill, and these qualities, together with his excellent knowledge of New Guinea and its climatic conditions, have made his services invaluable, not only to the R.A.A.F., but to the U.S. Army Air Forces and the New Guinea Forces as well.

== Later life ==
With the end of hostilities in the Pacific, Pentland was discharged from the RAAF on 2 November 1945. He took the opportunity to purchase surplus military equipment in New Guinea and established himself as a trader in Finschhafen, later expanding to Lae and Wau. In 1948, he went into business as a coffee planter in Goroka and also recruited labour from the highlands for industries on the coast. Prospering as a planter, he contributed to development of the region by building Goroka's original constant-flowing water supply and encouraging other businesses to set up there. His ongoing commitments in New Guinea meant that he was not invested with his Air Force Cross until 1950. In 1959, he sold his interests in Goroka and retired with Madge to their seaside home in Bayview, New South Wales. Madge Pentland died in 1982, and Jerry eighteen months later, on 3 November 1983, at the War Veterans Home in Collaroy. He was survived by daughter Carleen, and cremated on 7 November.
