= Jagdstaffel 12 =

Jasta 12
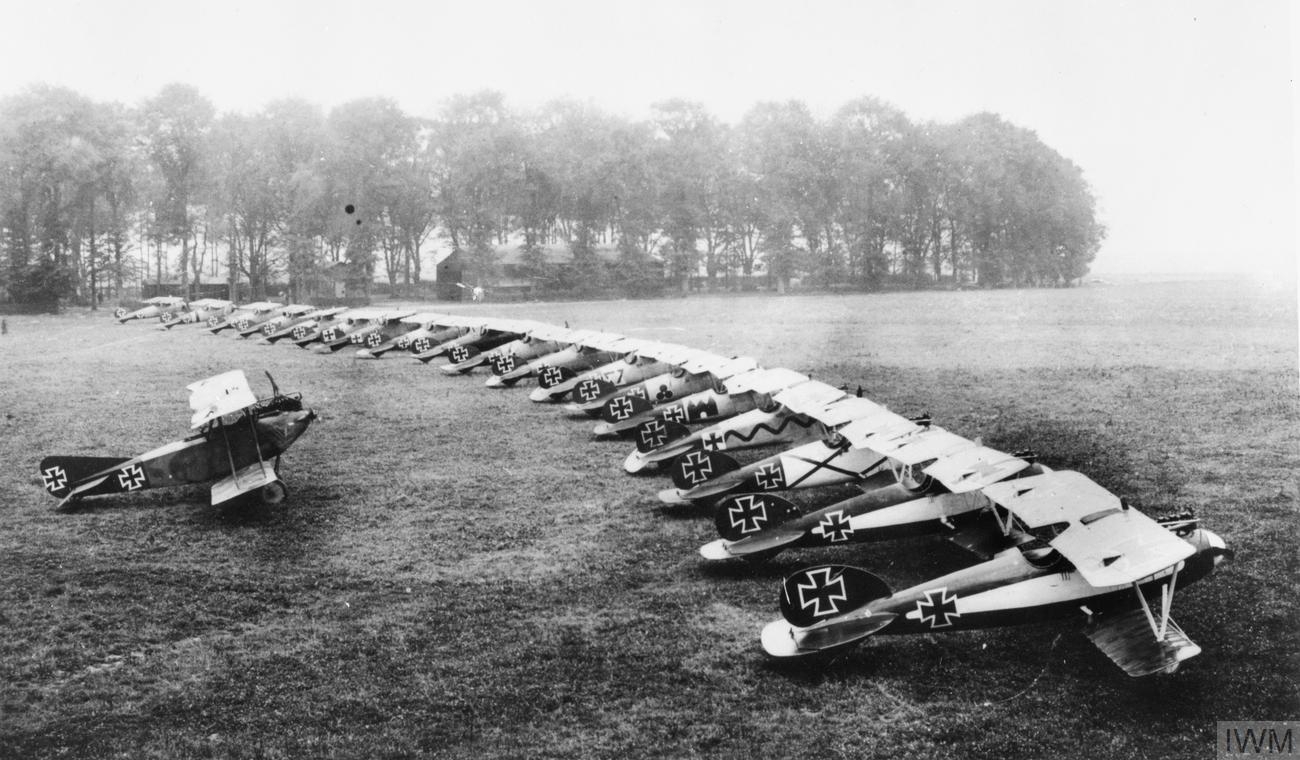
- Jasta 12's flightline of Albatros D.Vas in August/September 1917. An AEG C.IV liaison plane is at left.
- Active: 1916–1918
- Country: German Empire
- Branch: Luftstreitkräfte
- Type: Fighter squadron
- Engagements: World War I

Royal Prussian Jagdstaffel 12 was a World War I "hunting group" (i.e., fighter squadron) of the Luftstreitkräfte, the air arm of the Imperial German Army during World War I. As one of the original German fighter squadrons, the unit would score 155 aerial victories (including three wins over observation balloons) during the war, at the expense of seventeen killed in action, eight wounded in action, and one taken prisoner of war.

== History ==
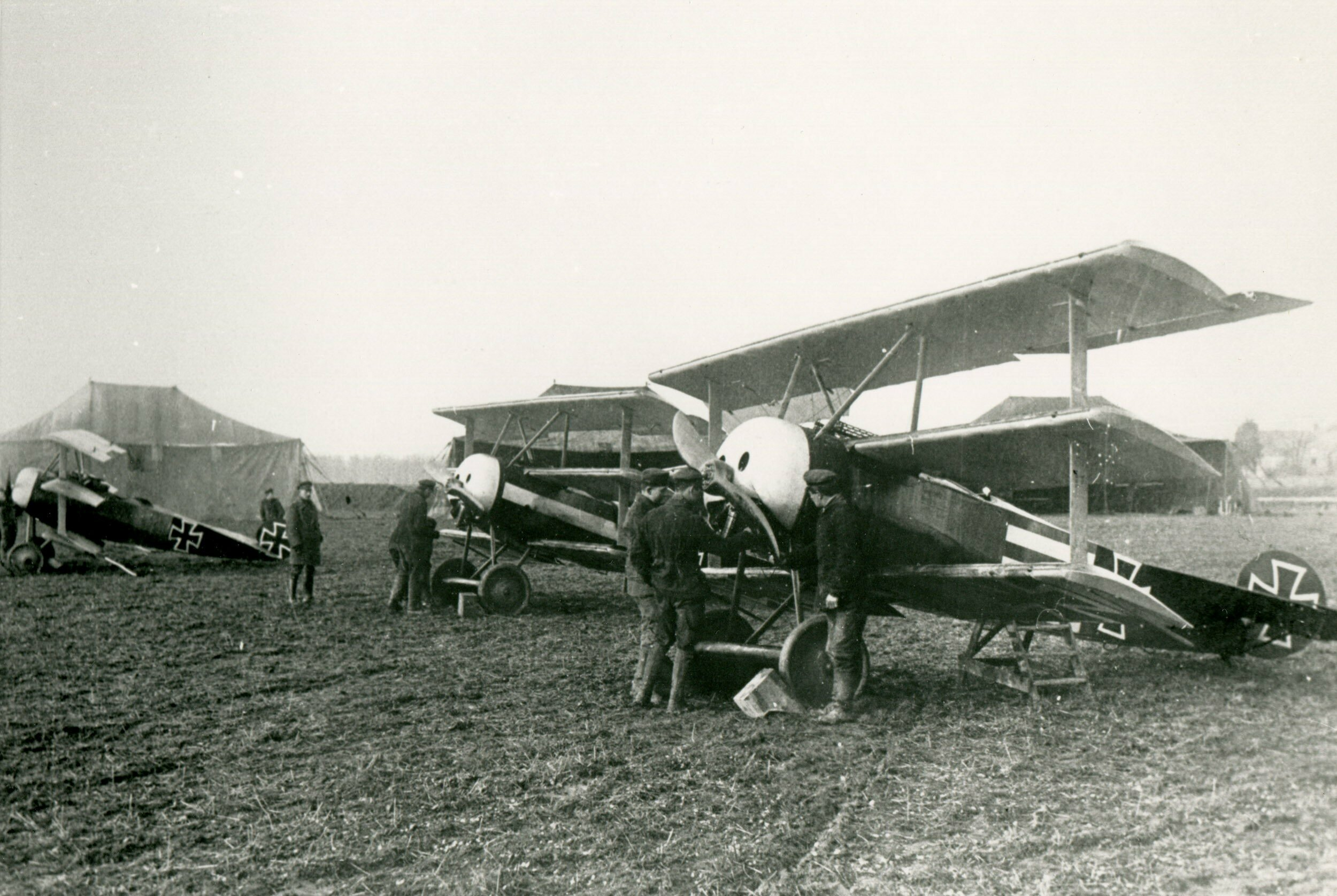
Jasta 12 flightline at Toulis, France

Royal Prussian Jagdstaffel 12 was created on 28 September 1916 from an existing ad hoc unit, Fokkerstaffel West. The new squadron mobilized on 12 October 1916 at Laon, France. It scored its first victory on 4 December 1916. The squadron was initially equipped with ill-performing Fokker D.Is. On 24 March 1917, the unit was credited with its tenth victory. The following month, Bloody April 1917, Jasta 12 downed 23 Royal Flying Corps aircraft. May saw 10 more victories. By the end of July, the jasta's scoreboard showed 74 victories. When it lost its ace commander, Adolf von Tutschek, to wounds, its new Staffelfuhrer led it to 22 victories in three months with no German losses.

By the time it joined Jagdgeschwader II (JG II) on 2 February 1918, Jasta 12 was a seasoned unit with 104 confirmed victories to its credit. However, the new JG II would have equipment problems as German supplies declined. On 26 May 1918, the jasta would find itself temporarily grounded by lack of aircraft.

Jasta 12 fought through the end of the war, disbanding only after Germany's loss. The squadron was credited with 155 aerial victories, including three enemy observation balloons. In turn, they suffered 17 killed in action, 8 wounded in action, and one taken prisoner of war.

== Commanding officers (Staffelführer) ==
1. Oberleutnant/Hauptmann Paul von Osterroht: 6 October 1916 – April 1917 (KIA)
2. Oberleutnant Adolf von Tutschek: 28 April 1917 – 11 August 1917 (WIA)
3. Leutnant Otto von Nostitz (Acting CO): 11 August 1917
4. Leutnant de Reserves Viktor Schobinger
5. Leutnant Otto von Nostitz (Acting CO): 15 November 1917
6. Oberleutnant Paul Blumenbach: 2 February 1918 – 18 May 1918
7. Leutnant Robert Hildebrand: 18 May 1918 – 13 July 1918
8. Leutnant de Reserves Hermann Becker: 13 July 1918 – 11 November 1918

== Duty stations (airfields) ==
1. Riencourt: 4 November 1916 – 26 January 1917
2. Herrlingen, Germany: 26 January 1917 – February 1917
3. Niederum
4. Epinoy, France: Unknown – 27 July 1917
5. Roncourt, France: 27 July 1917 – 18 August 1917
6. La Brayelle, Douai, France: 18 August 1917 – unknown.
7. Eringhem, France
8. Phalempin, France
9. Roncourt, France
10. Marle, France
11. Toulis, France: 13 February 1918 – 19 March 1918
12. Guise, France: 19 March 1918 – 12 June 1918
13. Le Mesnil: 12 June 1918 – unknown.
14. Roupy, France
15. Guisecourt
16. Balâtre, France
17. Bonneuil Ferme (Note: Possibly Bonneuil-en-Valois; or Esmery-Hallon, Somme department, which includes a place known as Ferme de Bonneuil.)
18. Mesnil-Bruntel, France
19. Leffincourt: 12 July 1918 – 24 July 1918
20. Chéry-lès-Pouilly, France
21. Fontaine-Notre-Dame, France (Note: Source (Jagdgeschwader Nr II: Geschwader Berthold) speaks of the "Fonfomme-Fontaine-Notre Dame road". It is likely this is an error, and Fonsommes is meant, next to Fontaine-Notre-Dame in the Aisne.)
22. Neuflize, France
23. Doncourt
24. Giraumont, France
25. Foreste, France: 10 August 1918 – 18 August 1918
26. Charmois, Stenay, France
27. Charmois, France
28. Florenville, Belgium
29. Trier, Germany

== Notable members ==
Adolf Schulte became the first ace in the squadron, on 24 March 1917. Three of the squadron's commanders, Adolf von Tutschek, Victor Shobinger, and Hermann Becker, were notable as aces as well as Staffelnführer. Also notable among the unit's fourteen aces were: Ulrich Neckel, winner of the Pour le Merite and Iron Cross; Reinhold Jörke, another Iron Cross awardee; and Paul Billik, an Iron Cross and Hohenzollern winner who was the highest scoring ace to be denied a Pour le Merite.

== Aircraft ==
Jasta 12 operated Fokker D.I, Albatros D.III, Fokker Dr.I, and Fokker D.VII fighter aircraft. Originally, the common squadron paint scheme was black tails and rear fuselages with white propeller spinners and/or engine cowlings.

Jasta 12 joined Jagdgeschwader II in February 1918. Identifiable by serial number or pilot insignia, these are some of the aircraft known to have served with the squadron:

- Two Albatros D.Vs
- Five Fokker Dr.Is
- Three Fokker D.VIIs
- One Halberstadt CL.II
- One Pfalz D.III
- One Siemens-Schuckert D.III
- One Siemens-Schuckert D.IV

However, during 1918, aircraft were in short supply despite JG II's hoarding of worn Fokker Dr.I triplanes. The withdrawal of newly issued Siemens-Schuckert D.IIIs led to shortages. In the worst instance, on 26 May 1918, Jasta 19 was temporarily grounded because it had no aircraft.

== Operations ==
Jasta 12 was formed in support of 7th Armee. On 4 November 1916, it was transferred to the 1st Armee sector. On 26 January 1917, it moved to service in the Armee-Abteilung A Sector. Shortly thereafter, it moved back to support of 1st Armee. Jasta 12 was one of the squadrons forming Jagdgeschwader II on 2 February 1918, joining Jasta 13, Jasta 15, and Jasta 19 in the new fighter wing.
