= Flixecourt =

- Commune
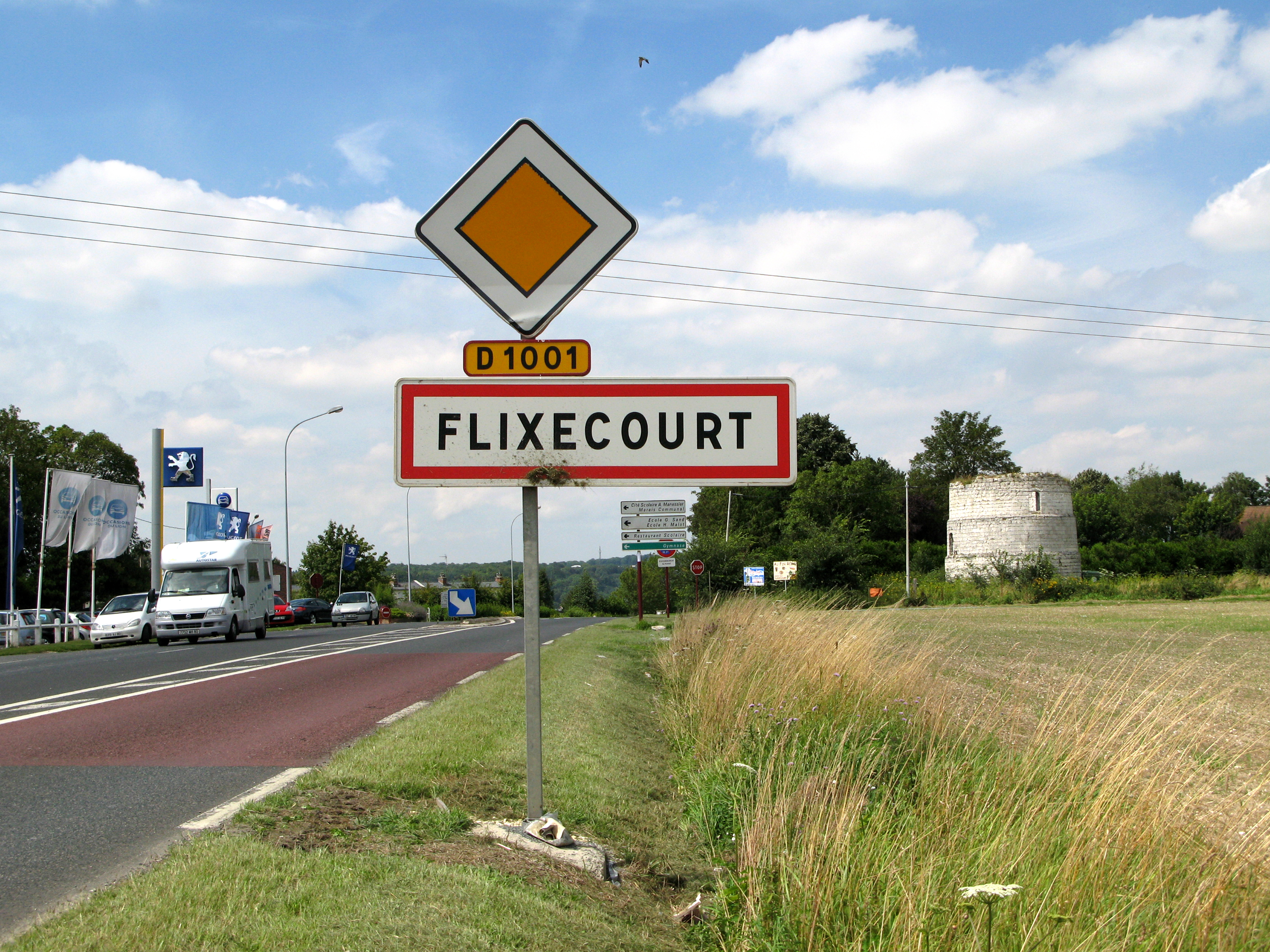
- The road into Flixecourt

- Coat of arms
- Location of Flixecourt
- Location within France Location within Hauts-de-France
- Coordinates: 50°00′49″N 2°04′55″E
- Country: France
- Region: Hauts-de-France
- Department: Somme
- Arrondissement: Amiens
- Canton: Flixecourt
- Intercommunality: CC Nièvre et Somme

Government
  - Mayor (2020–2026): Patrick Gaillard
- Area^{1}: 11.84 km^{2} (4.57 sq mi)
- Elevation: 82 m (269 ft)
- Highest elevation: 105 m (344 ft)
- Lowest elevation: 6 m (20 ft)
- Population (2023): 3,221
  - Density: 272.0/km^{2} (704.6/sq mi)
- Time zone: UTC+01:00 (CET)
  - Summer (DST): UTC+02:00 (CEST)
- INSEE/Postal code: 80318 /80420
- ^{1} French Land Register data, which excludes lakes, ponds, glaciers > 1 km^{2} (0.386 sq mi or 247 acres) and river estuaries.

Flixecourt (French pronunciation: [fliksəkuʁ]; Picard: Flichcourt) is a commune in the Somme department in Hauts-de-France in northern France.

== Geography ==
Flixecourt is situated on the N1 road and the banks of the river Nièvre, a tributary of the Somme, some 20 miles (32 km) south of Abbeville. A junction with the A16 autoroute is about a mile away.

== History ==
In the 12th century, Flixecourt was a fief of Amiens and the site of a leper hospice.

The fiefdom passed to the Louvencourt family, then in 1276 to the Fieffes family, who built a priory, entrusting the management of it to the vidame of Picquigny.

The town that was established here had 140 homes at the start of the Hundred Years War but only 40 in 1548.

In 1545, Charles d'Ailly obtained permission from the King to create a weekly market. This privilege continued for his son, Louis d'Ailly, in 1567.
In 1603, a huge fire burnt down half the town.

Near the site of the present-day church are vestiges of a château, mentioned in a notarial document in 1618, in which Philibert-Emmanuel d'Ailly, granted the structure to a certain Louis de la Massonière if he financed repairs.

Towards the end of the French Revolution, the château belonged to the Croquoison family.

The present church was built in 1721. The town's commerce at this time was based on the production of peat and of linen.

In 1815, there were two watermills and two windmills.

The discovery of a new natural fibre, jute, changed the destiny of both the town and the region. In 1840, the Saint brothers set up a weaving factory, employing locals and Scottish weavers. The factory was electrified in 1907. Before the outbreak of World War I, 14,000 people were employed here.

The town was the factory, and the factory was the town. The owners set in place all manner of improvements to the daily and social life of the workers. Piped water supplies and electricity to all homes, a school, a creche, a pharmacy, a maternity hospital and a co-operative.

After World War II and the advent of artificial fibres, the factory went into irreversible decline.

== Population ==
Historical population
Year	Pop.	±% p.a.
1968	3,459	—
1975	3,546	+0.36%
1982	3,276	−1.13%
1990	2,931	−1.38%
1999	2,978	+0.18%
2007	3,145	+0.68%
2012	3,221	+0.48%
2017	3,173	−0.30%
2023	3,221	+0.25%
Source: INSEE

== Places of interest ==
The town has a rich architectural heritage, typical of the Industrial Revolution. Many are in a bad state of repair. Some have been restored but more needs to be done.

- The château (Folly) of the Saint family
- The buildings of ‘La Prévoyance’, near the railway
- The church (the tower was rebuilt in 1940)
- The railway station, dating from 1875, (destroyed by a fire at the beginning of the 21st century)
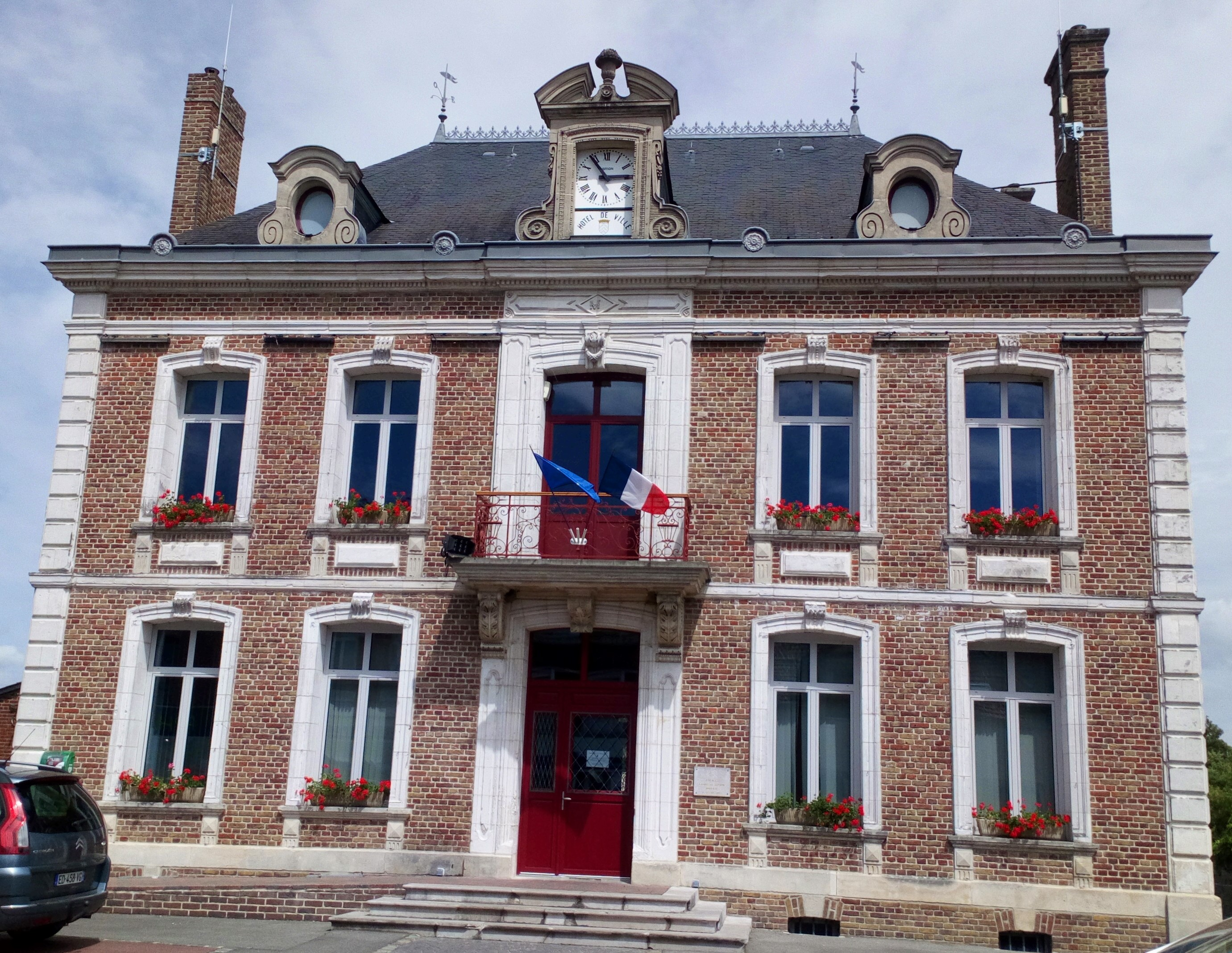
Town hall.

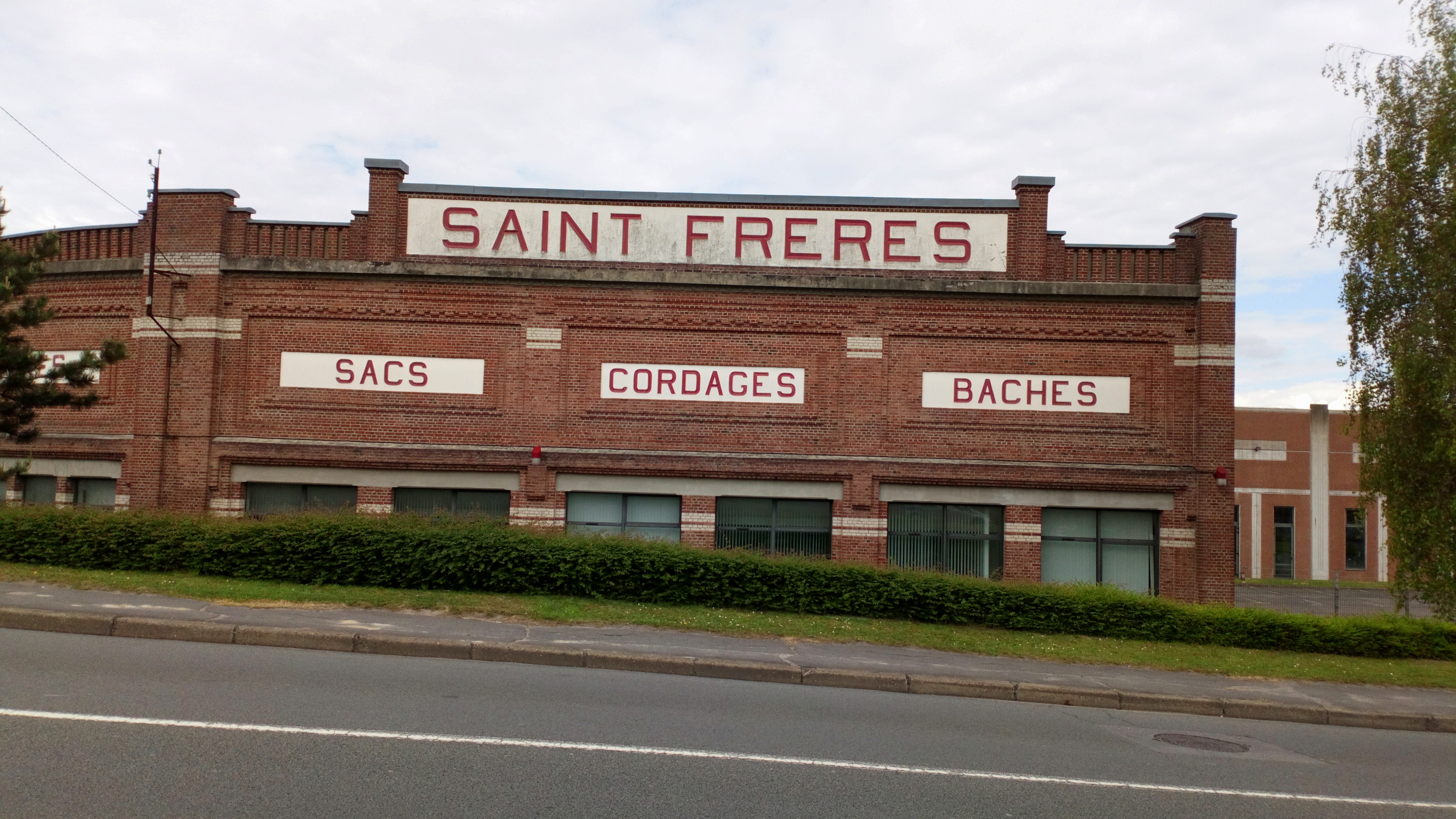
Saint Frères factory.

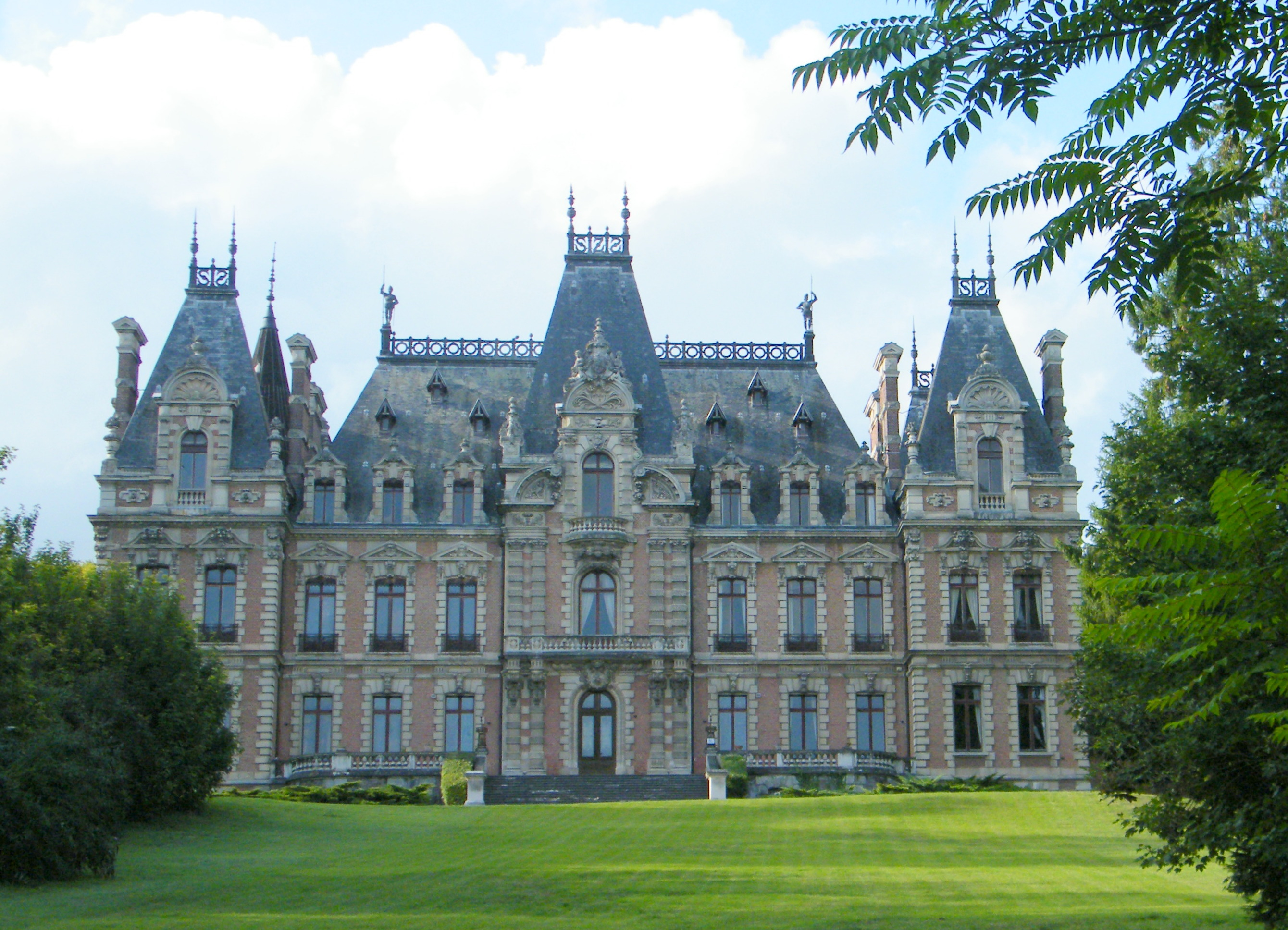
Château de la Navette.

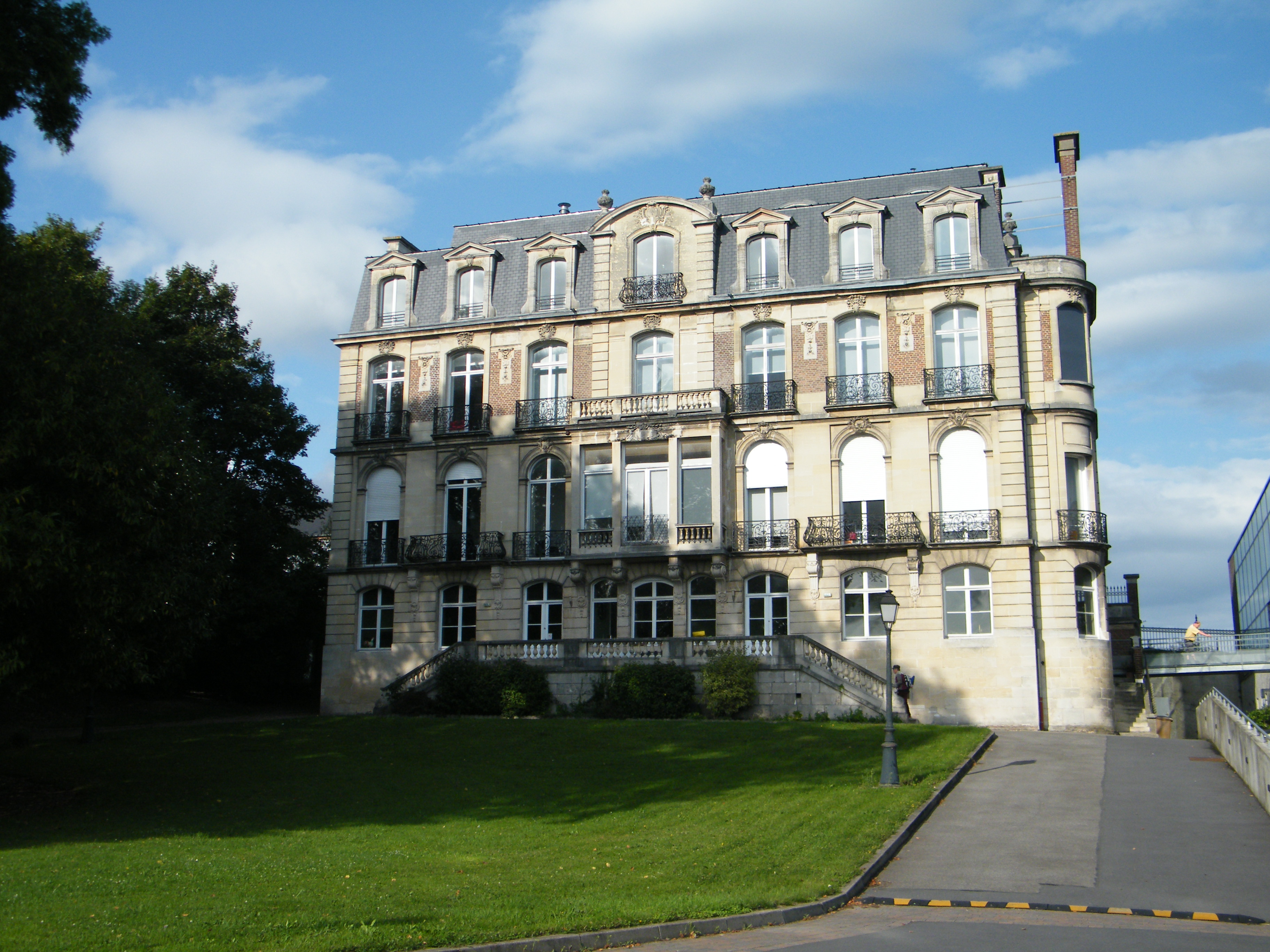
Château blanc.

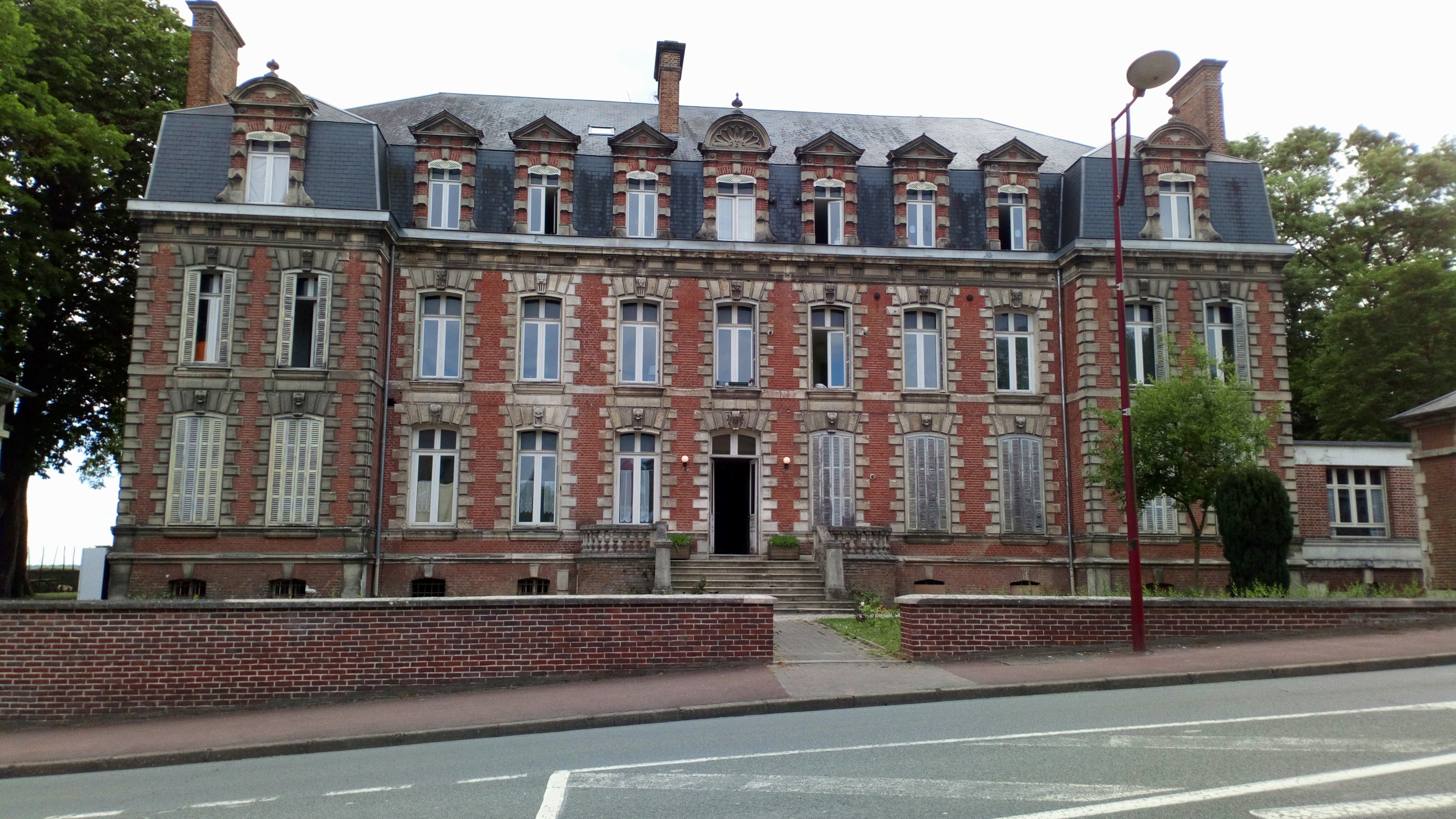
Château rouge.

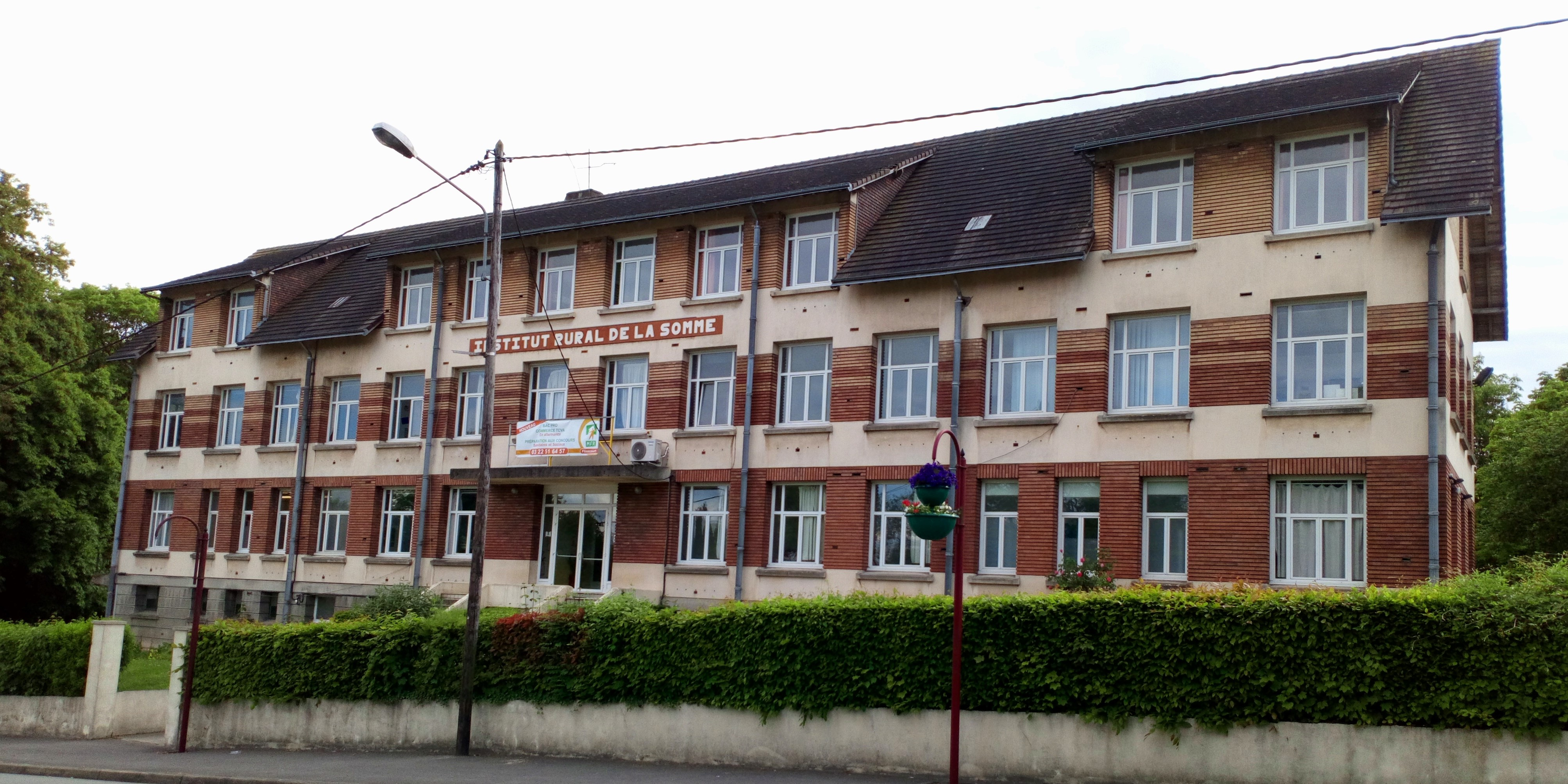
Institut rural de la Somme.

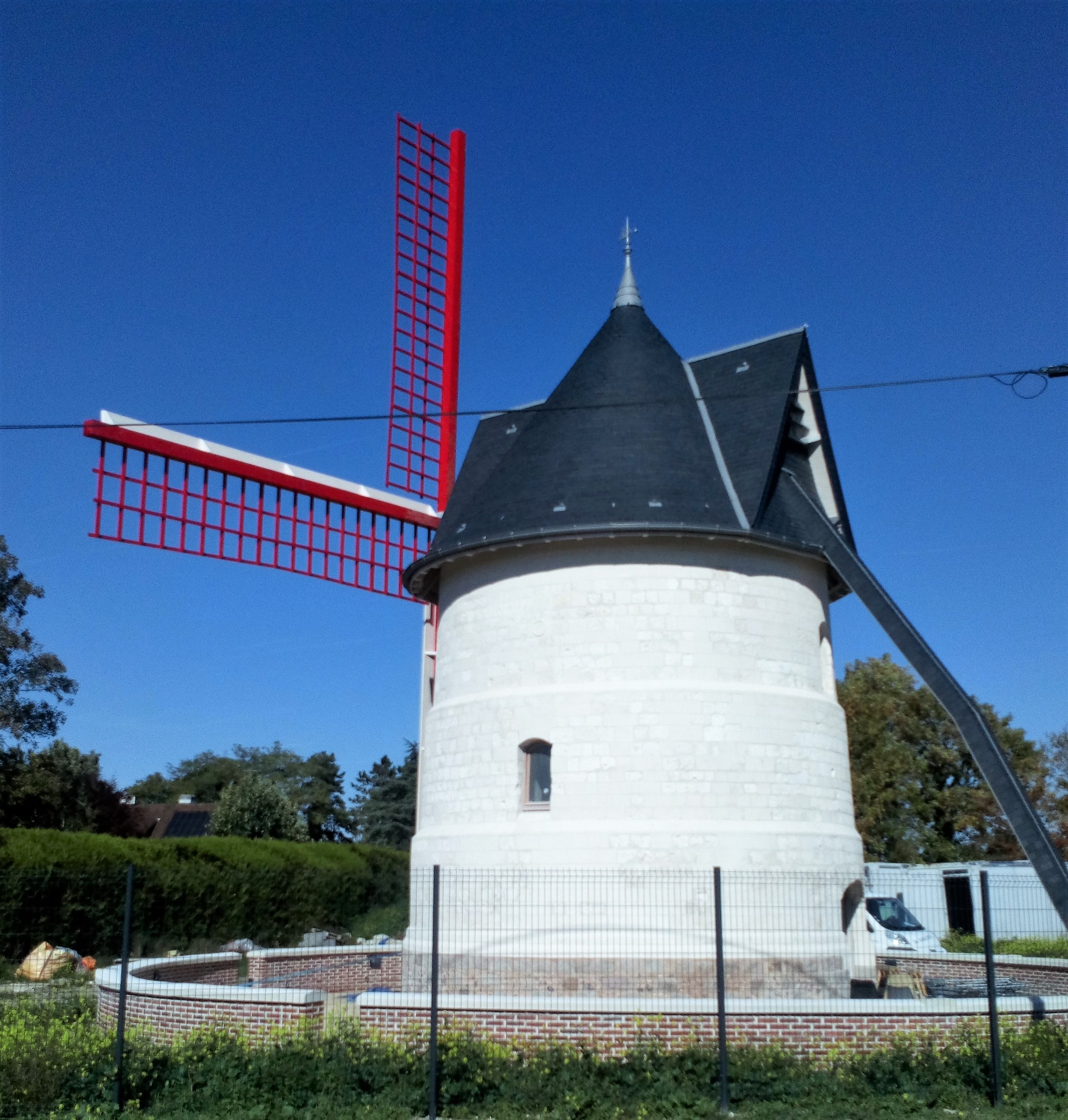
Moulin Basile.

== Personalities ==
Teddy Bertin, a French professional footballer, was born in Flixecourt, as was former World and Olympic track cycling champion Philippe Ermenault.

== See also ==
- Communes of the Somme department
