= 02459 =

02459 may refer to:

- Newton, Massachusetts, U.S., a city
- Marcy, Aisne, France, a commune
