= Nièvre (disambiguation) =

Nièvre is a department in central France.

Nièvre may also refer to:

- Nièvre (Loire), a river in central France, tributary of the Loire
- Nièvre (Somme), a river in northern France, tributary of the Somme
