= Morcourt =

Morcourt may refer to the following places in France:

- Morcourt, Aisne, a commune in the department of Aisne
- Morcourt, Somme, a commune in the department of Somme
