= Paul von Osterroht =

Paul Henning Aldabert Theodor von Osterroht
- Born: 13 September 1887; Luneberg, German Empire
- Died: 23 April 1917 (aged 29) near Cambrai, France
- Military career
- Allegiance: German Empire
- Branch: Luftstreitkräfte
- Service years: 1906–1917
- Rank: Hauptmann
- Units: BAO, Kampfstaffel 1
- Commands: Jagdstaffel 12
- Awards: Iron Cross First Class

Hauptmann Paul Henning Aldabert Theodor von Osterroht (13 September 1887–23 April 1917) IC was a German military aviation pioneer who became a flying ace in World War I. After valorous service as a bomber pilot and commander, he was called upon to found one of the original German Jagdstaffels. By March 1917 he led that unit into combat. Between 29 March and noon of 23 April, he scored seven aerial victories. Six hours later, he was killed in action while on patrol.

== Early life and service ==
Paul Henning Aldabert Theodor von Osterroht was born on 13 September 1887 in Luneberg, the German Empire. His father, Ernst Theodor Gustav Osterroht, since 1863 von Osterroht, was a Captain, later Oberstleutnant in the Dragoons. His oldest brother Hermann Theophil Ernst Siegfried von Osterroht was Rittmeister and Eskadronchef in World War I. His youngest brother Helmut Theodor Gotthilf Wilhelm von Osterroht (born 19 January 1894 in Tilsit) was at last Oberst of the Wehrmacht and from 1 June 1942 until 17 September 1944 "Stadt-/Kampfkommandant" of Aachen.

Paul von Osterroht also chose the profession of arms, and joined the German Army's Deutsch Ordens-Infanterie-Regiment Nr. 152 in May 1906. He was commissioned an officer on 18 August 1907. He switched to aviation duty, and was forwarded to Gotha on 13 April 1912 for pilot's training. He received license number 305 on 9 October 1912.

== World War I ==
Osterroht was serving in FFA 18 when World War I began. He was one of the first German airmen to be awarded the Iron Cross First Class, received on 7 October 1914. After FFA 18, he served with Brieftauben-Abteilung Ostende in 1914 and 1915; one of his aerial observers was Manfred von Richthofen. Together they downed a French airplane so far behind French lines the victory could not be verified.

On 30 January 1915, Osterroht was promoted to Oberleutnant. In May 1916, he transferred to Kampfstaffel (Tactical Bomber Squadron) 1 of Kampfgeschwader (Tactical Bomber Wing) 1. He was soon given command of the squadron. His service with them ended when he was appointed to command one of Germany's original fighter squadrons, Jagdstaffel 12, as it was being founded. The unit was founded with over-age Fokker D.Is; however, by March 1917, they had been re-equipped with newer Albatros D.III fighters. Osterroht claimed serial number 1958/16 for his own, and had it marked with a four square checkerboard in black and white. On 24 March, the jasta received a telegram from their higher command congratulating the unit on its performance in downing 14 enemy aircraft.

Osterroht scored his first aerial victory on 19 March 1917; at noon of 23 April he scored his seventh. Later on the 23rd, he flew an evening patrol to Cambrai. There he engaged Sopwith Pups of 3 Naval Squadron, and fell to his death at about 1800 hours.

== Aerial victory list ==
See also Aerial victory standards of World War I

No.	Date/time	Foe	Location
1	19 March 1917 @ 0940 hours	SPAD	Roisel-Templeux
2	3 April 1917 @ 1720 hours	Royal Aircraft Factory B.E.2c	Bullecourt
3	6 April 1917 @ 0830 hours	Royal Aircraft Factory FE.2d	Lagnicourt
4	6 April 1917 @ 1215 hours	Sopwith Triplane	Malakow Station
5	12 April 1917 @ 1030 hours	Sopwith Pup	Marquion-Bourlon
6	22 April 1917 @ 2005 hours	Spad	South of Marcoing
7	23 April 1917 @ 1200 hours	Sopwith	Fontaine
