= Fontaine-Notre-Dame =

Fontaine-Notre-Dame may refer to:

- Fontaine-Notre-Dame, Aisne, a commune in the department of Aisne in France
- Fontaine-Notre-Dame, Nord, a commune in the department of Nord in France
