= Essigny-le-Petit =

- Commune
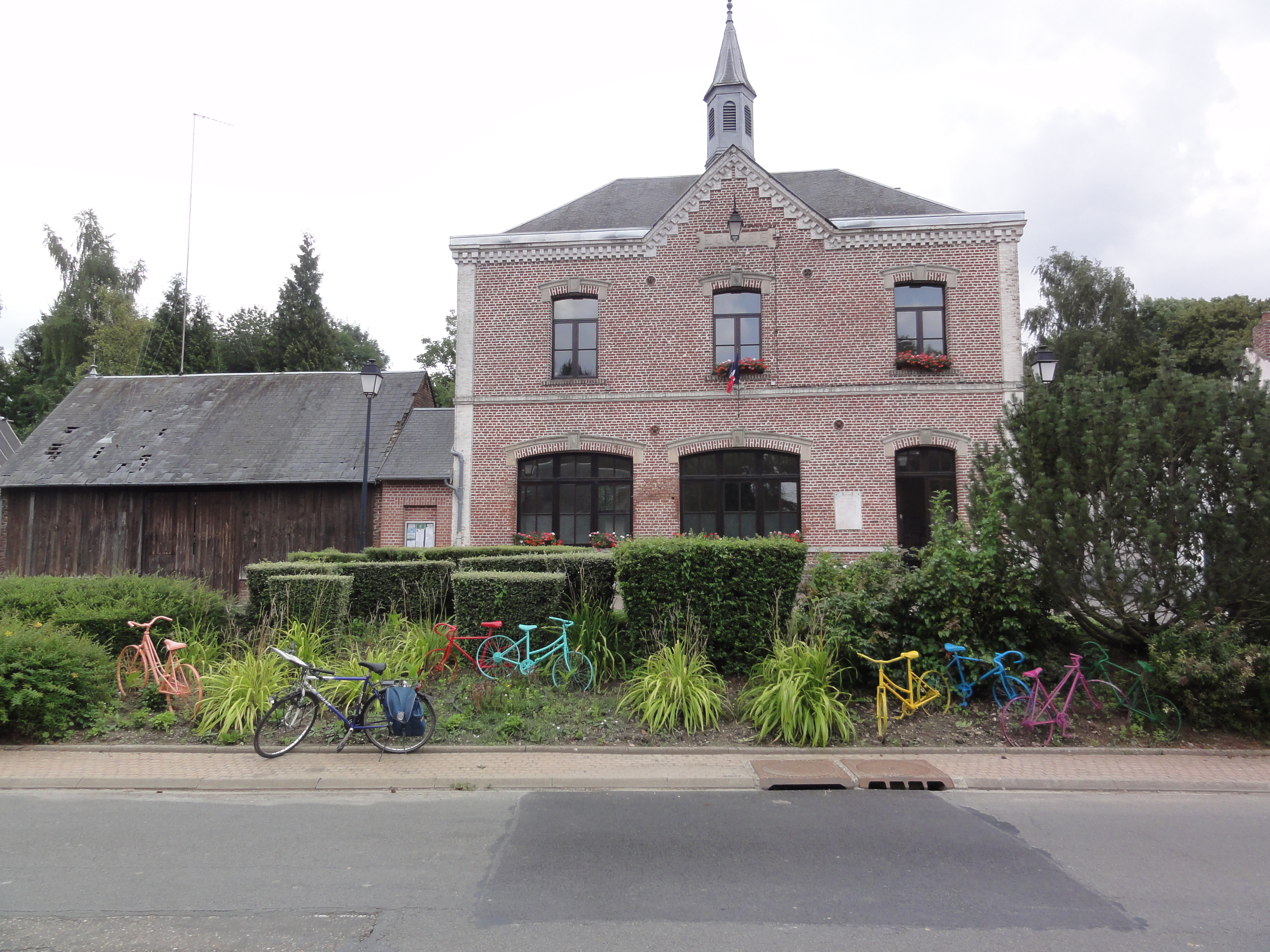
- The town hall of Essigny-le-Petit
- Location of Essigny-le-Petit
- Location within France Location within Hauts-de-France
- Coordinates: 49°54′01″N 3°22′02″E
- Country: France
- Region: Hauts-de-France
- Department: Aisne
- Arrondissement: Saint-Quentin
- Canton: Saint-Quentin-2
- Intercommunality: CA Saint-Quentinois

Government
  - Mayor (2026–32): Arnaud Proix
- Area^{1}: 4.53 km^{2} (1.75 sq mi)
- Elevation: 89 m (292 ft)
- Highest elevation: 131 m (430 ft)
- Lowest elevation: 82 m (269 ft)
- Population (2023): 345
  - Density: 76.2/km^{2} (197/sq mi)
- Time zone: UTC+01:00 (CET)
  - Summer (DST): UTC+02:00 (CEST)
- INSEE/Postal code: 02288 /02100
- ^{1} French Land Register data, which excludes lakes, ponds, glaciers > 1 km^{2} (0.386 sq mi or 247 acres) and river estuaries.

Essigny-le-Petit (French pronunciation: [esiɲi lə pəti]) is a commune in the Aisne department in Hauts-de-France in northern France.

== Population ==
Historical population
Year	Pop.	±% p.a.
1968	402	—
1975	421	+0.66%
1982	383	−1.34%
1990	399	+0.51%
1999	377	−0.63%
2007	349	−0.96%
2012	381	+1.77%
2017	344	−2.02%
2023	345	+0.05%
Source: INSEE

== See also ==
- Communes of the Aisne department
