= Rouvroy, Aisne =

Rouvroy
- Commune
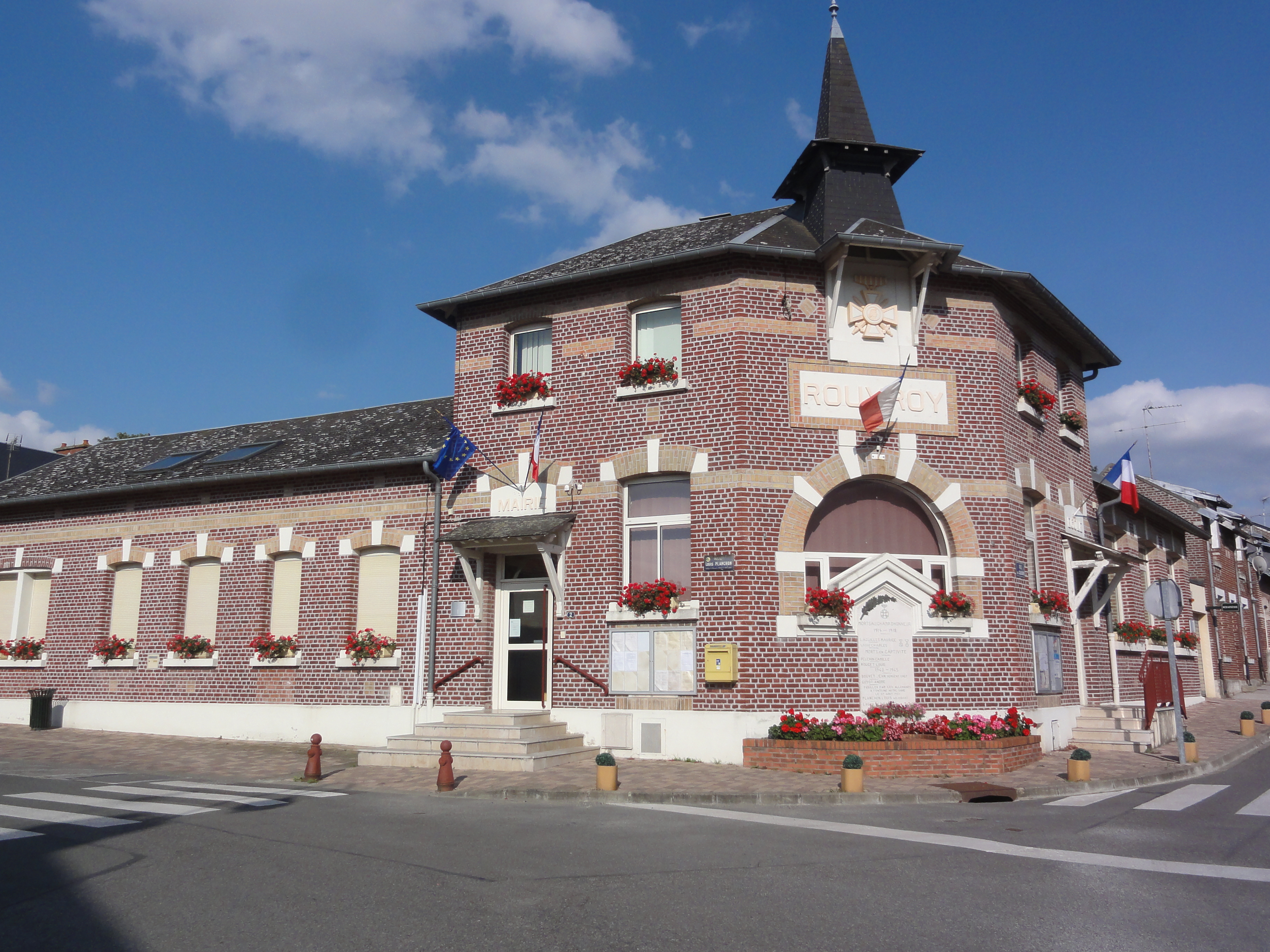
- The town hall of Rouvroy
- Location of Rouvroy
- Location within France Location within Hauts-de-France
- Coordinates: 49°51′20″N 3°19′10″E
- Country: France
- Region: Hauts-de-France
- Department: Aisne
- Arrondissement: Saint-Quentin
- Canton: Saint-Quentin-2
- Intercommunality: CA Saint-Quentinois

Government
  - Mayor (2026–32): Philippe Lemoine
- Area^{1}: 5.05 km^{2} (1.95 sq mi)
- Elevation: 157 m (515 ft)
- Highest elevation: 121 m (397 ft)
- Lowest elevation: 73 m (240 ft)
- Population (2023): 506
  - Density: 100/km^{2} (260/sq mi)
- Time zone: UTC+01:00 (CET)
  - Summer (DST): UTC+02:00 (CEST)
- INSEE/Postal code: 02659 /02100
- ^{1} French Land Register data, which excludes lakes, ponds, glaciers > 1 km^{2} (0.386 sq mi or 247 acres) and river estuaries.

Rouvroy (French pronunciation: [ʁuvʁwa]) is a commune in the Aisne department and Hauts-de-France region of northern France.

== Population ==
Historical population
Year	Pop.	±% p.a.
1968	316	—
1975	400	+3.42%
1982	510	+3.53%
1990	464	−1.17%
1999	425	−0.97%
2007	376	−1.52%
2012	492	+5.53%
2017	510	+0.72%
2023	506	−0.13%
Source: INSEE

== See also ==
- Communes of the Aisne department
