= Canton of Saint-Quentin-2 =

Coordinates: 49.86°N 3.28°E

Saint-Quentin-2
- Canton
- Interactive map of Saint-Quentin-2
- Country: France
- Region: Hauts-de-France
- Department: Aisne
- No. of communes: {{{nbcomm}}}
- Area: 89.17 km^{2} (34.43 sq mi)
- Population (2023): 22,822
  - Density: 255.9/km^{2} (662.9/sq mi)
- INSEE code: 02 14

The canton of Saint-Quentin-2 (before 2015: Saint-Quentin-Nord) is an administrative division in northern France. It consists of the northern part of the town of Saint-Quentin and its northern suburbs. It includes the following communes:

1. Essigny-le-Petit
2. Fieulaine
3. Fonsomme
4. Fontaine-Notre-Dame
5. Lesdins
6. Marcy
7. Morcourt
8. Omissy
9. Remaucourt
10. Rouvroy
11. Saint-Quentin (partly)

== Demographics ==
Historical population
Year	Pop.	±% p.a.
2013	24,357	—
2018	22,799	−1.31%
Source: INSEE

== See also ==
- Cantons of the Aisne department
- Communes of France
