= Adolf Schulte =

German World War I flying ace

- Born: 24 December 1894; Lüdenscheid, Germany
- Died: 12 April 1917 (aged 22); North of Baralle
- Military career
- Allegiance: German Empire
- Branch: Aviation
- Rank: Leutnant
- Unit: Jagdstaffel 12
- Awards: Iron Cross

Leutnant Adolf Schulte (24 December 1894 – 12 April 1917) IC was a German World War I flying ace credited with nine aerial victories. His short gallant career would end in a fatal midair crash with his enemies.

== Early life ==
Adolf Schulte was born in Ludenscheit, Germany on 24 December 1894.

== World War I ==
Schulte joined Jagdstaffel 12 in November 1916. He became its first ace during the opening months of 1917, scoring nine victories. On 12 April 1917, he first downed Edwin Hayne. He subsequently collided with a Royal Aircraft Factory FE.2d from No. 18 Squadron RAF to score his final victory, killing both himself and the British pilot and observer.

== List of aerial victories ==
See also Aerial victory standards of World War I

| No. | Date/time | Aircraft | Foe | Result | Location | Notes |
|---|---|---|---|---|---|---|
| 1 | 11 December 1916 @ 1245 hours | Albatros | Royal Aircraft Factory B.E.2c | Destroyed | Annequin | 10 Sqn. RFC 2/Lt GW Dampier, KIA & 2/Lt HC Barr, KIA |
| 2 | 6 February 1917 @ | Albatros | Nieuport | Destroyed | Grand Range-Ferme | |
| 3 | 6 March 1917 @ 1320 hours | Albatros | Royal Aircraft Factory F.E.2d serial number 1953 | Destroyed | South of Boiry | 57 Sqn. RFC, Capt. RSR Bloomfield & 2/lt. VD Lons lePOWs |
| 4 | 11 March 1917 @ 1105 hours | Albatros | Royal Aircraft Factory F.E.2d | Destroyed | Ligny | 18 Sqn. RFC, Sgt. HP Burgess KIA & 2/Lt. HM Headley KIA |
| 5 | 24 March 1917 @ 1030 hours | Albatros | Royal Aircraft Factory F.E.2d | Destroyed | Southwest of Hendecourt | |
| 6 | 3 April 1917 @ 1710 hours | Albatros | Royal Aircraft Factory F.E.2b | Destroyed | Northeast of Saint-Léger | 23 Sqn. RFC, Sgt JA Cunniffe OK & 2/A JT Mackie WIA |
| u/c | 3 April 1917 | Albatros | Airco DH.2 s/n A2536 | | | |
| u/c | 5 April 1917 @ 1105 hours | Albatros | Royal Aircraft Factory FE.2b | | Le Pavé | |
| u/c | 6 April 1917 @ 0830 hours | Albatros | | | Anneaux | |
| 7 | 11 April 1917 @ 0855 hours | Albatros | Royal Aircraft Factory BE.2d s/n 5849 | Destroyed | Tilloy | |
| 8 | 11 April 1917 @ 0905 hours | Albatros | Sopwith Pup s/n N5185 | Destroyed | West of Neuvireuil | Schulte's victim was future ace Edwin Hayne |
| 9 | 12 April 1917 @ 1040 hours | Albatros D.III s/n 1996/16 | Royal Aircraft Factory F.E.2d s/n 4995 | Destroyed in midair collision | North of Baralle | 18 Sqn. RFC, Lt. OT Walton, KIA & 2/AM JC Walker, KIA. Schulte died in this midair collision |
