= Fokker D.IV =

World War I German fighter biplane

D.IV
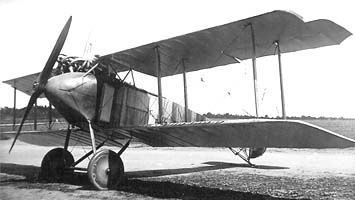

General information
- Type: Fighter
- Manufacturer: Fokker
- Designer: Martin Kreutzer
- Primary users: Imperial German Air Service Swedish Air Force
- Number built: 44

History
- Introduction date: 1916
- Developed from: Fokker D.I

The Fokker D.IV was a biplane fighter designed by the Fokker Aircraft Company (Fokker-Flugzeugwerke) during the First World War for the Imperial German Army's (Deutsches Heer) Imperial German Air Service (Fliegertruppen des deutschen Kaiserreiches). It was a development of the D.I with a more powerful engine and armament. It saw service in limited numbers beginning in late 1916 because structural problems caused by the use of poor-quality components coupled with poor workmanship at the factory. Only a single aircraft is known to have served in a front-line combat unit before all Fokker fighters were withdrawn from those units at the end of 1916 to serve in home defense and training units because of those problems.

== Development ==
The Fokker D.IV had a more powerful 160-horsepower (120 kW) Mercedes D.III engine than the 120 hp (89 kW) Mercedes D.I engine of the D.I and its armament was increased to a pair of fixed, forward-firing 7.92 mm (.312 in) LMG 08/15 machine guns. The D.IV was also designed to use ailerons for roll control rather than the wing warping used in earlier Fokker fighters.

== Operational history ==
A contract for 40 aircraft was awarded by the Imperial German Air Service in anticipation of the aircraft passing its static load testing in October. Numerous components failed, but were replaced at Fokker's expense and the D.IV ultimately passed. The D.IV's troubles caused an comprehensive investigation into its aircraft that had seen frontline service that revealed structural weaknesses in multiple aircraft. Structural failure causing a D.I's wings to collapse in early December and a series of five Eindecker crashes caused the Air Service to ban the front-line use of Fokker aircraft on 6 December after a series of structural failures due to poor workmanship and a lack of quality control at the factory. Only a single aircraft flown by Hans von Keudell of Jasta 1 can be confirmed saw any service on the Western Front with all others being relegated to a training role or home defense duties.

The Swedish Air Force also bought four examples of the type powered by 150 hp (110 kW) Benz Bz.III engines., but only one was assembled and armed, the remaining three being stored in a dismantled state.

== Operators ==
German Empire

- Luftstreitkrafte - 40 aircraft

Sweden

- Swedish Air Force - Four aircraft

== Specifications ==
Data from Fokker Aircraft of WWI: Volume 3: Early Biplane Fighters: A Centennial Perspective on Great War Airplanes

General characteristics

- Crew: 1
- Length: 6.3 m (20 ft 8 in)
- Wingspan: 9.7 m (31 ft 10 in)
- Height: 2.45 m (8 ft 0 in)
- Wing area: 22.5 m^{2} (242 sq ft)
- Empty weight: 606 kg (1,336 lb)
- Gross weight: 841 kg (1,854 lb)
- Powerplant: 1 × Mercedes D.III water-cooled straight-six piston engine
- Propellers: 2-bladed

Performance

- Maximum speed: 160 km/h (99 mph, 86 kn)

Armament

- 2 × fixed, forward-firing 7.92 mm (.312 in) LMG 08/15 machine guns

== Bibliography ==
- Gray, Peter & Thetford, Owen (1987) [1970]. German Aircraft of the First World War (2nd ed.). London: Putnam. ISBN 0-85177-809-7.
- Green, William & Swanborough, Gordon (2001) [1994]. The Complete Book of Fighters: An Illustrated Encyclopedia of Every Fighter Built and Flown (Revised and Updated ed.). London: Salamander Books. ISBN 1-84065-269-1.
- Herris, Jack & Leckscheid, Jörn (2021). Fokker Aircraft of WWI: Volume 3: Early Biplane Fighters: A Centennial Perspective on Great War Airplanes. Great War Aviation Centennial Series. Vol. 53. n.p.: Aeronaut Books. ISBN 978-1-953201-05-8.
- Lamberton, W. M. Fighter Aircraft of the 1914-1918 War. Letchworth, Herts, UK: Harleyford Publications Limited, 1960.
- Wagner, Ray and Heinz Nowarra. German Combat Planes: A Comprehensive Survey and History of the Development of German Military Aircraft from 1914 to 1945. New York: Doubleday, 1971.
