= Hermann Becker =

WWI German flying ace (1887–1970)

- Born: 10 September 1887; Trebus, Upper Silesia, Germany
- Died: 21 April 1970 (aged 82)
- Military career
- Allegiance: German Empire
- Branch: Luftstreitkräfte
- Rank: Leutnant
- Units: Flieger-Abteilung 2 (Flier Detachment 2); Flieger-Abteilung 57 (Flier Detachment 57); Kampfgeschwader 5 (Tactical Bomber Wing 5); Schutzstaffel 11 (Protection Squadron 11); Jagdstaffel 12 (Fighter Squadron 12)
- Commands: Jagdstaffel 12
- Awards: House Order of Hohenzollern; Iron Cross First and Second Class

Leutnant Hermann Becker (10 September 1887 – 21 April 1970), was a World War I German flying ace credited with 23 victories.

== Early life ==
Hermann Becker was born on 10 September 1887 in Trebus, Upper Silesia.

== World War I service ==
Becker joined the air force in 1916 as an aerial observer on the Eastern Front, serving with Flieger-Abteilung 2 (Flier Detachment 2) and Flieger-Abteilung 57 (Flier Detachment 57). After completing his pilot's training, Becker moved to Kampfgeschwader 5 (Tactical Bomber Wing 5), then to Schutzstaffel 11 (Protection Squadron 11) in France, where he was involved in action at the Somme and Verdun. On 12 January 1917, he was awarded the First Class Iron Cross, having been previously given the Second Class award.

In May 1917, Becker transferred to Jagdstaffel 12 to fly fighter aircraft. He scored his first aerial victory on 6 June 1917. On 16 June 1917 he was wounded in action fighting No. 60 Squadron RFC and was unable to fly for several months. He would not resume his string of victories until 23 September 1917.

On 13 July 1918, with 11 victories to his credit, he was promoted to squadron command as a Staffelführer and continued to have success in part because he was issued a Fokker D VII. His second victory on 26 September 1918 was especially memorable; when he set an Airco DH.4 afire, the observer leaped overboard without a parachute just as the bomber exploded. Becker made his 23rd kill on 3 November 1918, when he and his wingmen shot down five SPADs in five minutes. Becker was nominated for a Pour le Mérite medal, but never received it because of the abdication of Kaiser Wilhelm on 9 November.

== Post World War I ==
Hermann Becker survived the war; He was the Commercial director of the gliding school Grunau / Silesia from the early 30's until 1945. He died 21 April 1970

== Decorations and awards ==
- Prussian military pilot badge
- Iron Cross (1914), 1st and 2nd class
- Knight's Cross of the Royal House Order of Hohenzollern with Swords (15 May 1918)
