= Remaucourt, Aisne =

Remaucourt
- Commune
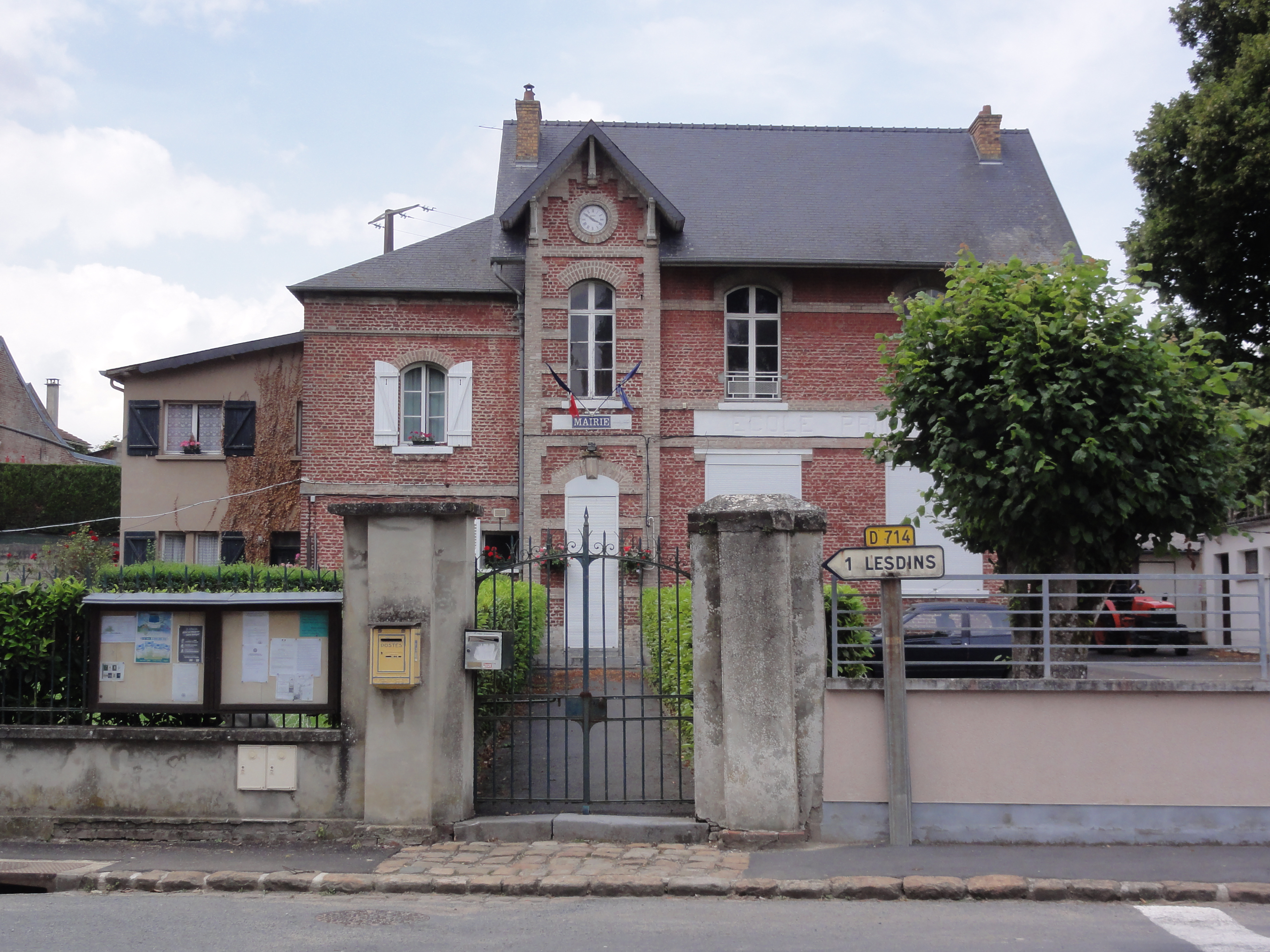
- The town hall of Remaucourt
- Location of Remaucourt
- Location within France Location within Hauts-de-France
- Coordinates: 49°53′49″N 3°20′32″E
- Country: France
- Region: Hauts-de-France
- Department: Aisne
- Arrondissement: Saint-Quentin
- Canton: Saint-Quentin-2
- Intercommunality: CA Saint-Quentinois

Government
  - Mayor (2026–32): Damien Sebbe
- Area^{1}: 6.35 km^{2} (2.45 sq mi)
- Elevation: 90 m (300 ft)
- Highest elevation: 144 m (472 ft)
- Lowest elevation: 78 m (256 ft)
- Population (2023): 265
  - Density: 41.7/km^{2} (108/sq mi)
- Time zone: UTC+01:00 (CET)
  - Summer (DST): UTC+02:00 (CEST)
- INSEE/Postal code: 02637 /02100
- ^{1} French Land Register data, which excludes lakes, ponds, glaciers > 1 km^{2} (0.386 sq mi or 247 acres) and river estuaries.

Remaucourt (French pronunciation: [ʁəmokuʁ]) is a commune in the Aisne department in Hauts-de-France in northern France.

== Population ==
Historical population
Year	Pop.	±% p.a.
1968	288	—
1975	286	−0.10%
1982	368	+3.67%
1990	406	+1.24%
1999	372	−0.97%
2007	334	−1.34%
2012	314	−1.23%
2017	299	−0.97%
2023	265	−1.99%
Source: INSEE

== See also ==
- Communes of the Aisne department
