= Nièvre (Somme) =

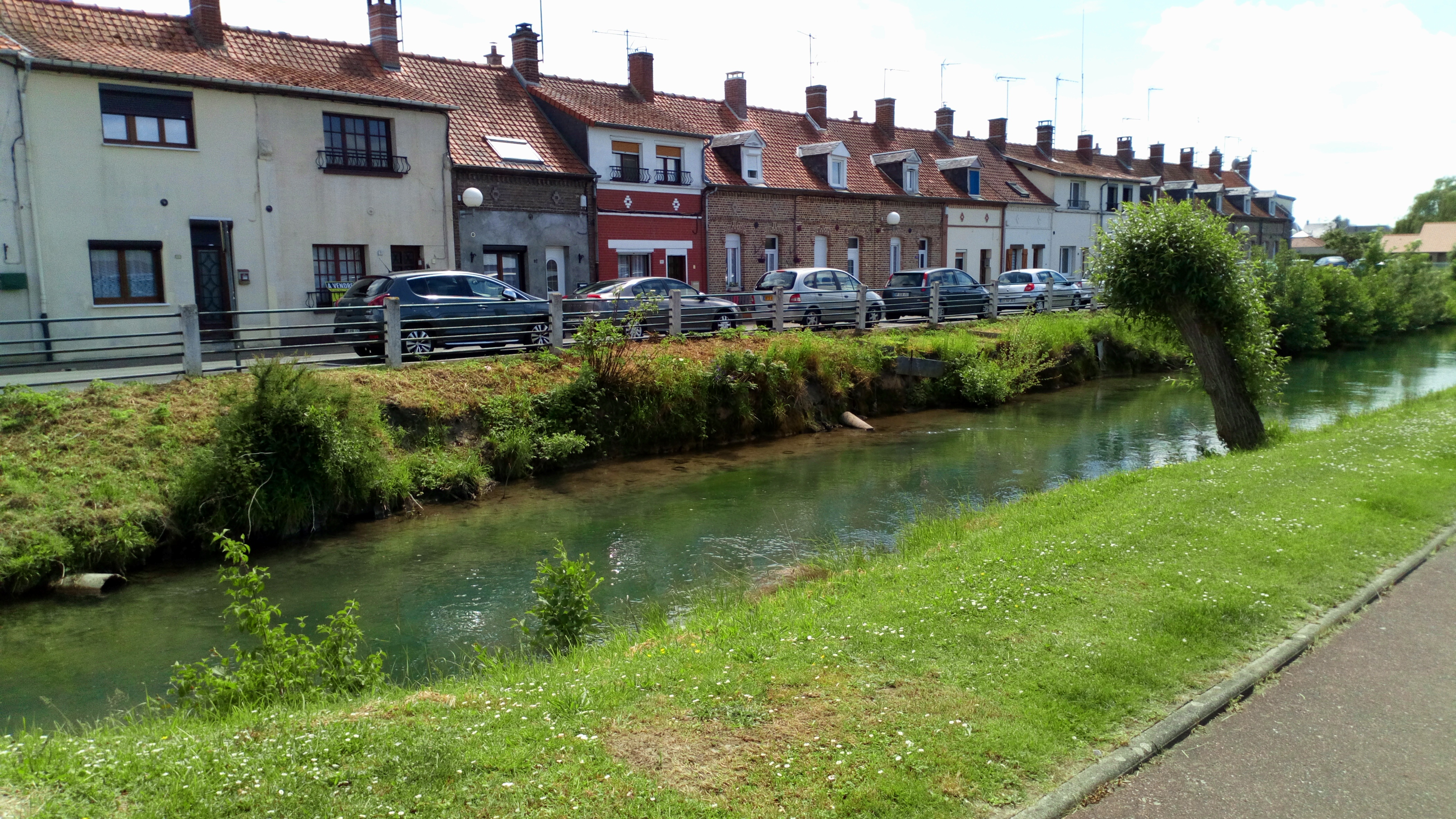
- The Nièvre in Flixecourt

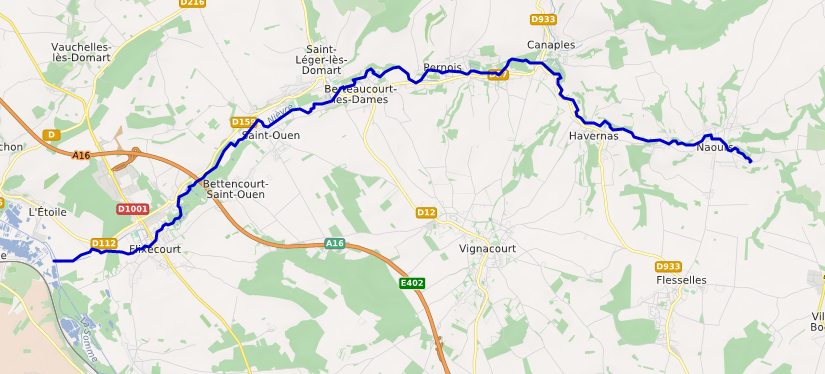
- Course of the Nièvre

Location
- Country: France

Physical characteristics
- Mouth: Somme
  - coordinates: 50°00′33″N 2°02′54″E
- Length: 22.0 km (13.7 mi)

Basin features
- Progression: Somme→ English Channel

The Nièvre is a river in the department of Somme, Hauts-de-France region of northern France. It is a 22 kilometres (14 mi) long right tributary of the Somme. Its source is in the commune of Naours and it flows into the Somme near Flixecourt.
