= Somme (river) =

River in France

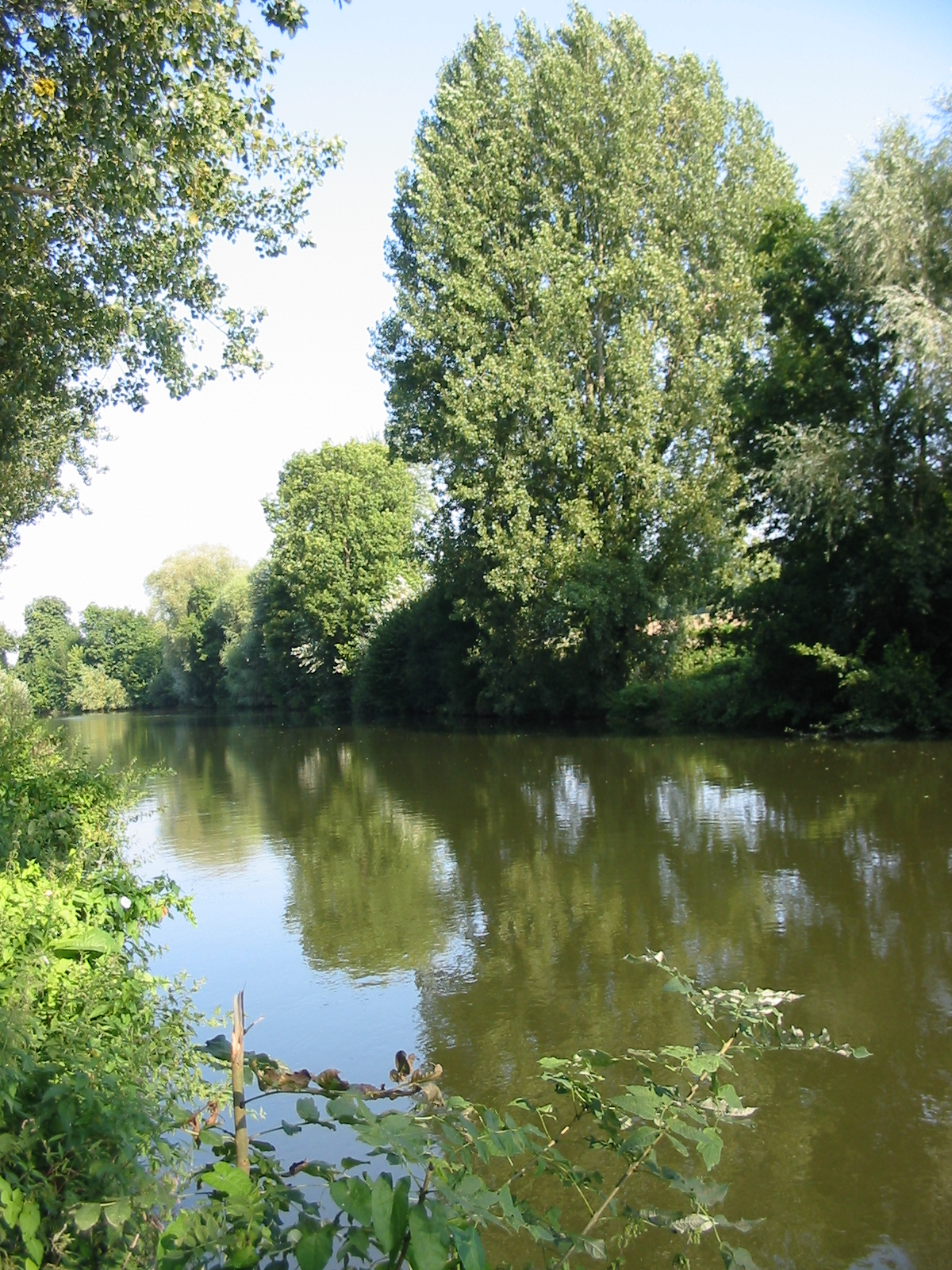
- The Somme

- Somme basin with course in Northern France
- Native name: Sonme (Picard)

Location
- Country: France
- Region: Picardy

Physical characteristics
- Source
  - location: Fonsommes
  - coordinates: 49°54′23″N 03°24′11″E
  - elevation: 85 m (279 ft)
- Mouth
  - location: Saint-Valery-sur-Somme; English Channel
  - coordinates: 50°11′10″N 01°38′35″E
- Length: 245 km (152 mi)
- Basin size: 6,550 km^{2} (2,530 sq mi)
- Discharge
  - location: Abbeville
  - average: 35 m^{3}/s (1,200 cu ft/s)

The Somme (UK: /sɒm/ SOM, US: /sʌm/ SUM; French: [sɔm]; Picard: Sonme) is a river in Picardy, northern France.

The river is 245 km (152 mi) in length, from its source in the high ground of the former Arrouaise Forest at Fonsomme near Saint-Quentin, to the Bay of the Somme, in the English Channel. It lies in the geological syncline which also forms the Solent. This gives it a fairly constant and gentle gradient where several fluvial terraces have been identified.

== Name ==
The Somme river was known in ancient times as Samara. It presumably means 'the summery river', that is to say the 'quiet river', stemming from an adjective *sam-aro- ('summery') itself derived from the Celtic root *samo- ('summer').

The city of Amiens was also known as Samarobriva (Gaulish: 'bridge on the Samara'). It is attested by the early 1st century BC as the chief town of the Ambiani, an ancient Gallic tribe of the region. The modern department of Somme was named after this river.

== History ==
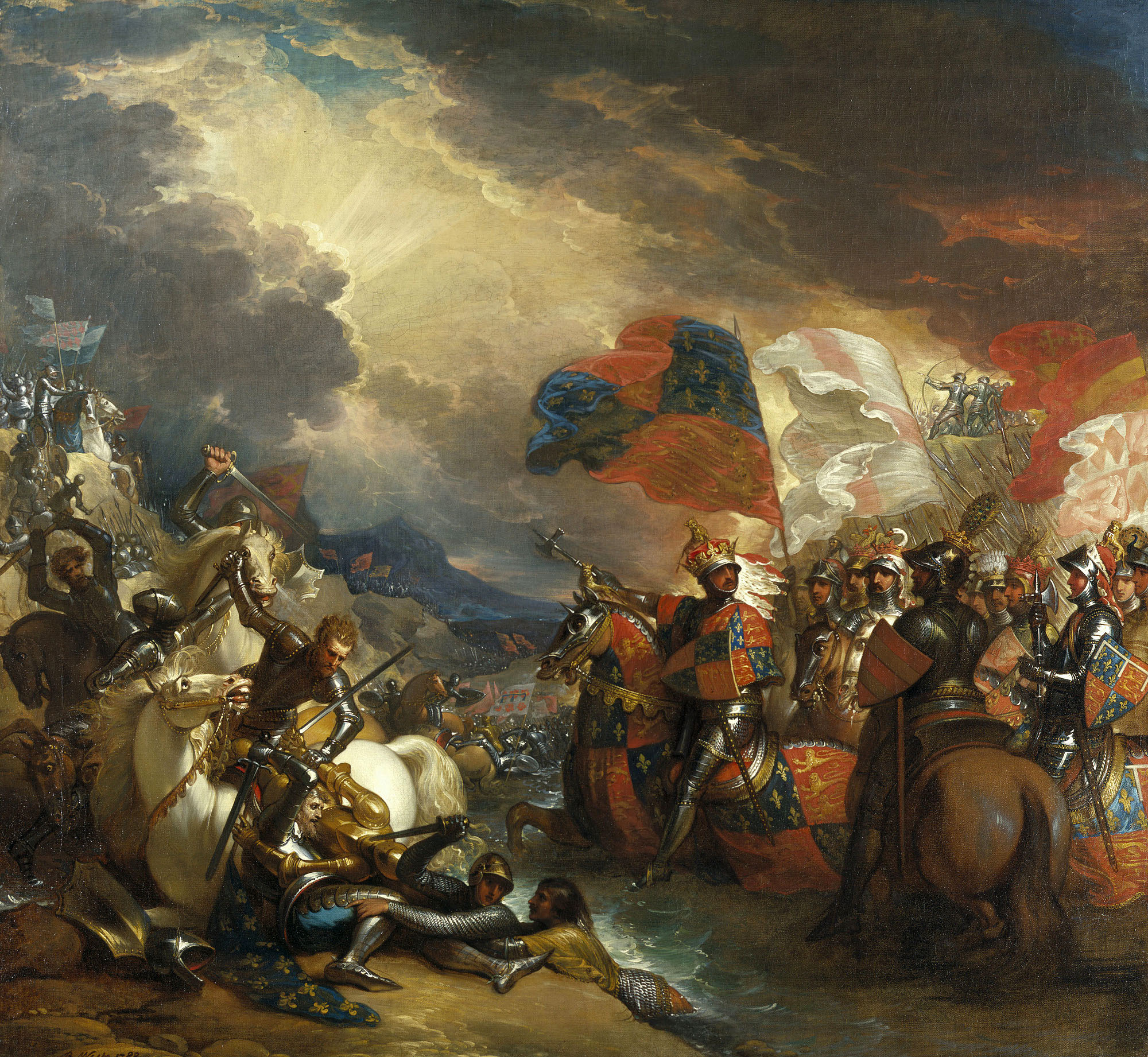
Edward III Crossing the Somme, King Edward III (at the Battle of Blanchetaque): painting by Benjamin West, 1788

The Somme has featured prominently in several military campaigns. In 1066, the invasion fleet of William the Conqueror assembled in the Bay of the Somme, at Saint-Valery-sur-Somme. The river also featured in the 1346 withdrawal of Edward III of England's army, which forded the river at the Battle of Blanchetaque during the campaign, which culminated in the Battle of Crécy. Crossing the river also featured prominently in the campaign which led to the Battle of Agincourt in 1415.

In 1636, a Spanish army led by Thomas Francis, Prince of Carignano, crossed the Somme defeating a French army during the Thirty Years War threatening Paris.

Most famously, the Battle of the Somme, during World War I, lasted from July to November 1916 and resulted in more than a million casualties. Private A. S. Bullock in his wartime memoir recalled his first sight of it in early April 1918: "... we reached a small place called Hengest sur Somme. The train stopped and we descended. There in front of us was a muddy, sluggish and somewhat narrow stream, which has given its name to one of the most awful battles in history – the Somme." The great battles that finally stopped the German advance in the Spring Offensive of 1918 were fought around the valley of the Somme in places like Villers Bretonneux, which marked the beginning of the end of the war.

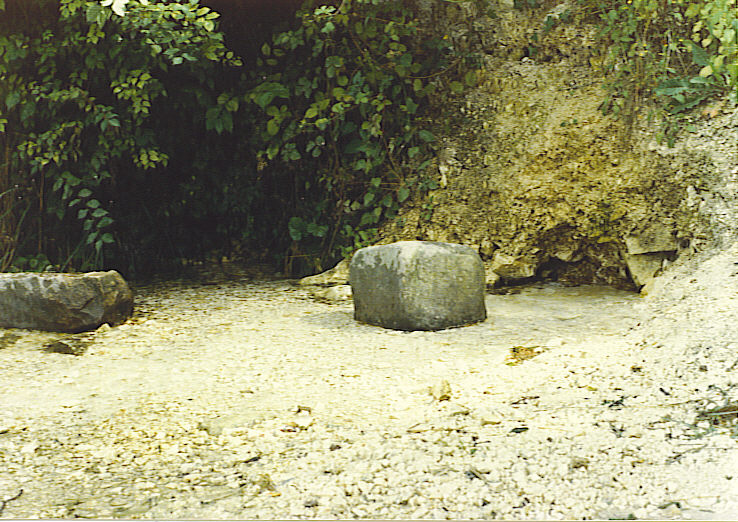
The source of the Somme, at Fonsommes

== Départements and towns along the river ==
- Aisne: Saint-Quentin
- Somme : Ham, Péronne, Corbie, Amiens, Abbeville, Saint-Valery-sur-Somme, Le Crotoy

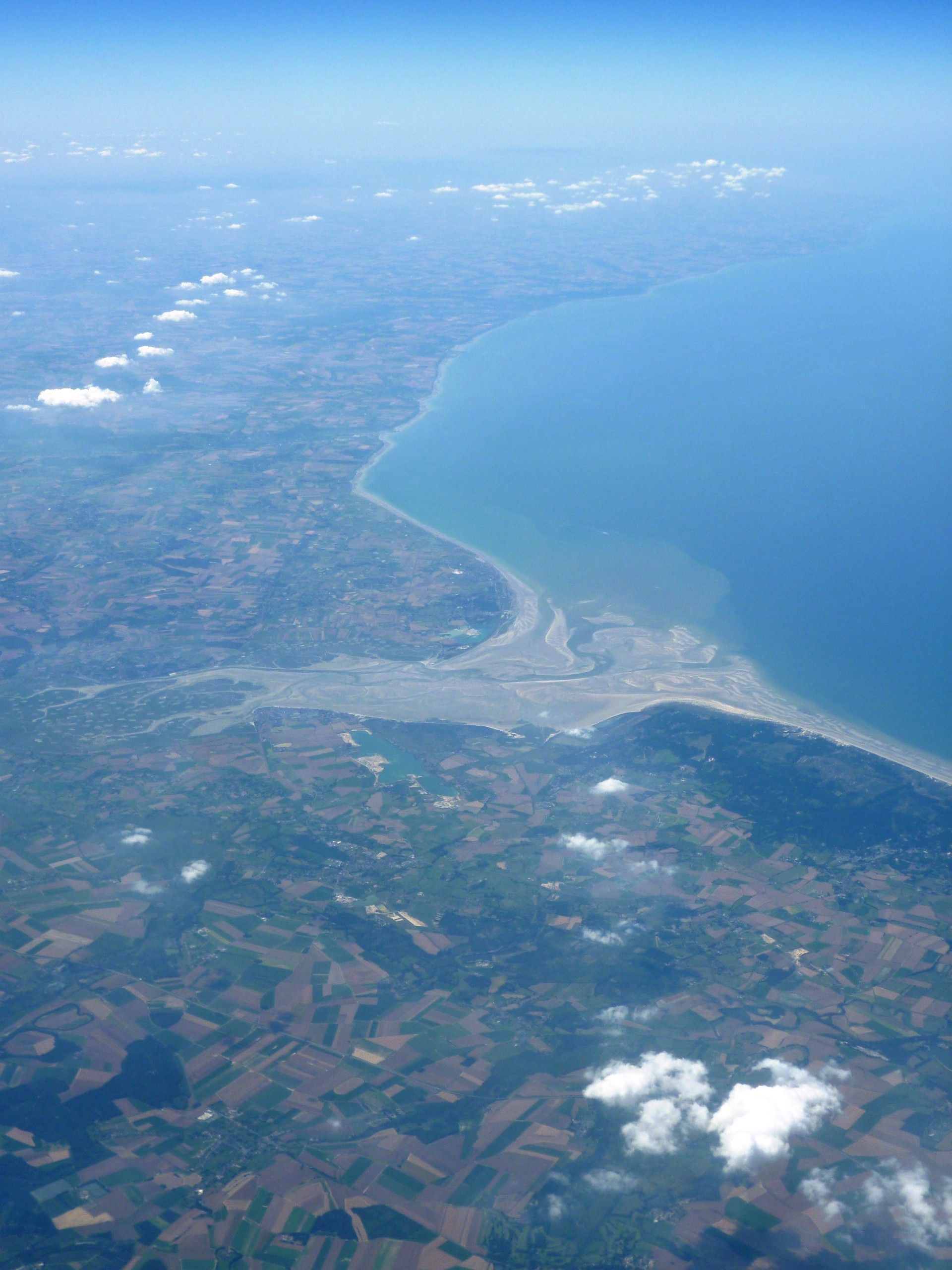
The mouth of the Somme in the English Channel

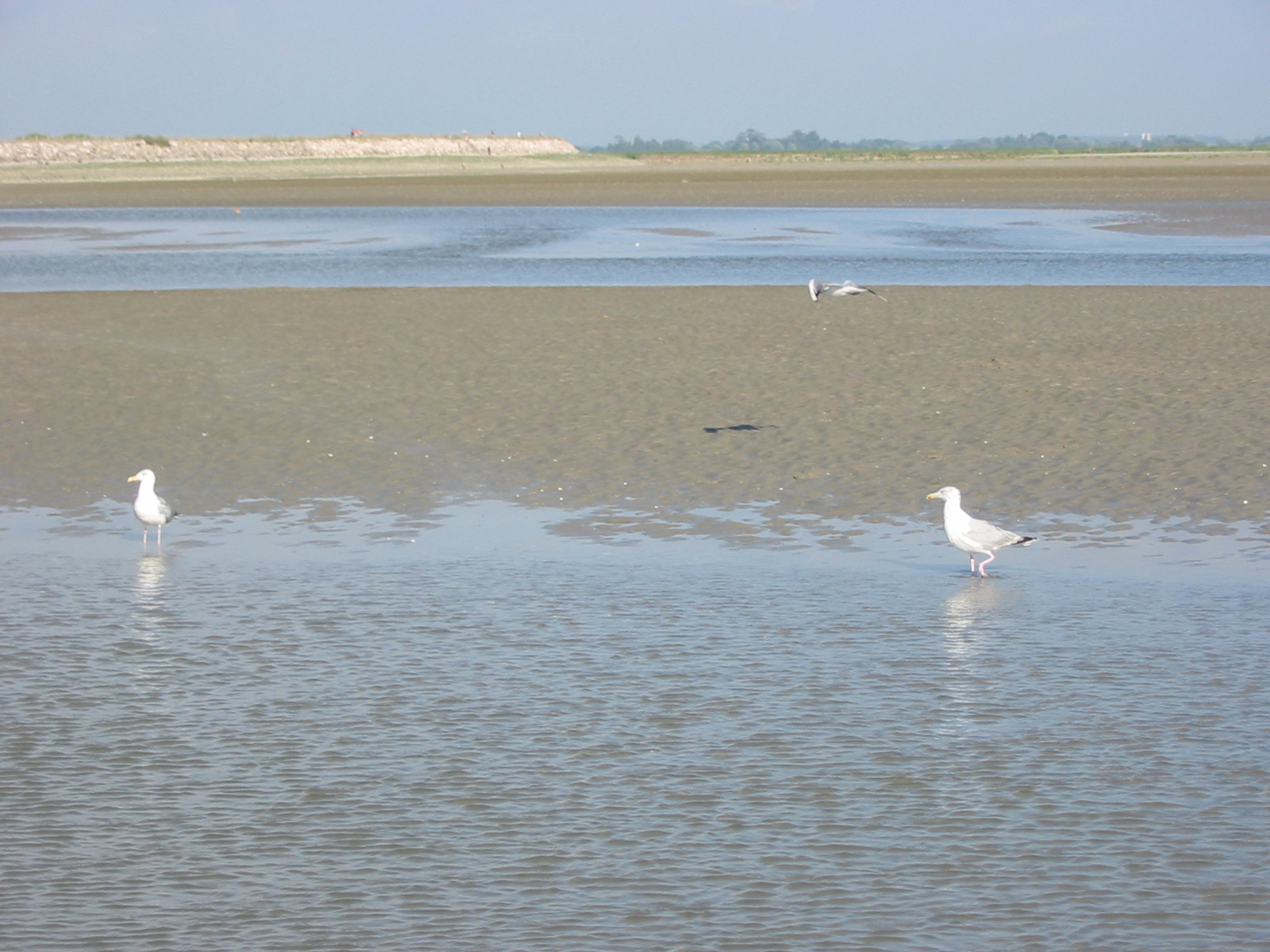
The estuary is now much smaller than it once was but still extensive.

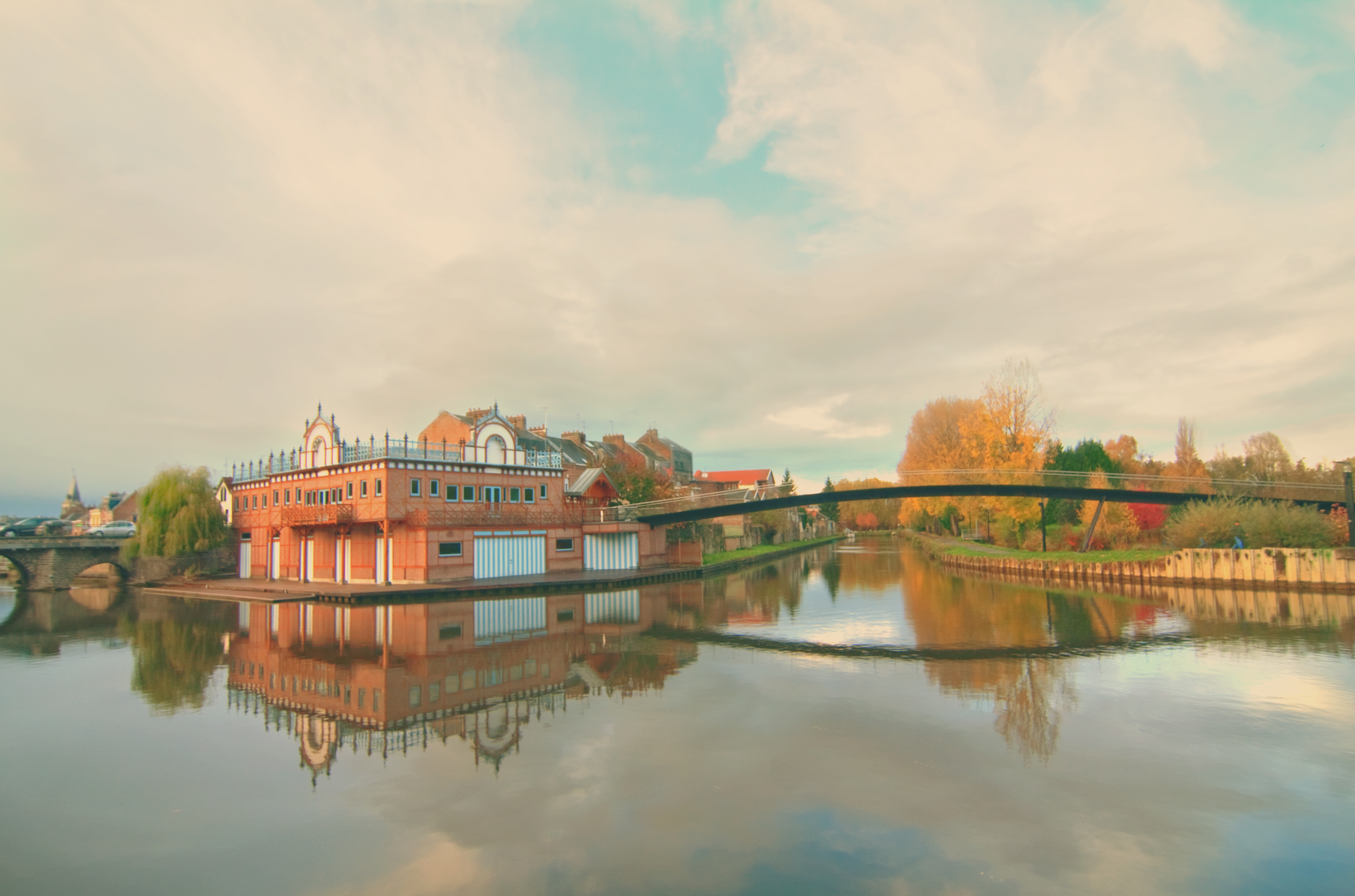
The Somme at Amiens

== Tributaries ==
The tributaries listed comprise:

Left tributaries:

1. the Sommette,
2. the Beine,
3. the Allemagne,
4. the Ingon,
5. the Avre with tributaries Luce and Noye,
6. the Selle,
7. the Saint-Landon,
8. the Airaines,
9. the Trie,
10. the Amboise and l'Avalasse

Right tributaries:

1. the Germaine,
2. the Omignon,
3. the Cologne,
4. La Tortille,
5. the Ancre,
6. the Hallue,
7. the Nièvre,
8. the Scardon,
9. the Dien

== Hydrology ==
The river is characterized by a very gentle gradient and a steady flow. The valley is more or less steep-sided but its bottom is flat with fens and pools. These characteristics of steady flow and flooded valley bottom arise from the river's being fed by the ground water in the chalk basin in which it lies. At earlier, colder times, from the Günz to the Würm (Beestonian or Nebraskan to Devensian or Wisconsinian) the river has cut down into the Cretaceous geology to a level below the modern water table. The valley bottom has now therefore, filled with water which, in turn, has filled with fen. This picture, of the source of the Somme in 1986, shows it when the water table had fallen below the surface of the chalk in which the aquifer lies. Here, the flow of water had been sufficient to keep fen from forming.

(Note: A satellite photograph of the area shows the fenny valley crossing the chalk to the sea on the left. The sinuous length at the centre of the picture lies downstream from Péronne.)

One of the fens, the Marais de l'Île is a nature reserve in the town of St.Quentin. The traditional market gardens of Amiens, the Hortillonages are on this sort of land but drained. Once exploited for peat cutting, the fen is now used for fishing and shooting

In 2001, the Somme valley was affected by particularly high floods, which were in large part due to a rise in the water table of the surrounding land.

=== Flow-rate data (external links) ===
==== Monthly flow rates ====
Catchment area 5,560 km^{2} (2,150 sq mi).

- at Abbeville.

==== Flow rates at Hangest-sur-Somme ====
Daily flow rates compared with mean rates for the time of year at Hangest-sur-Somme (m^{3}/s). Catchment area 4,835 km^{2} (1,867 sq mi).

==== Flow rates at Péronne ====
Mean flow rates monthly and daily at Péronne (m^{3}/s). Catchment area 1,294 km^{2} (500 sq mi).

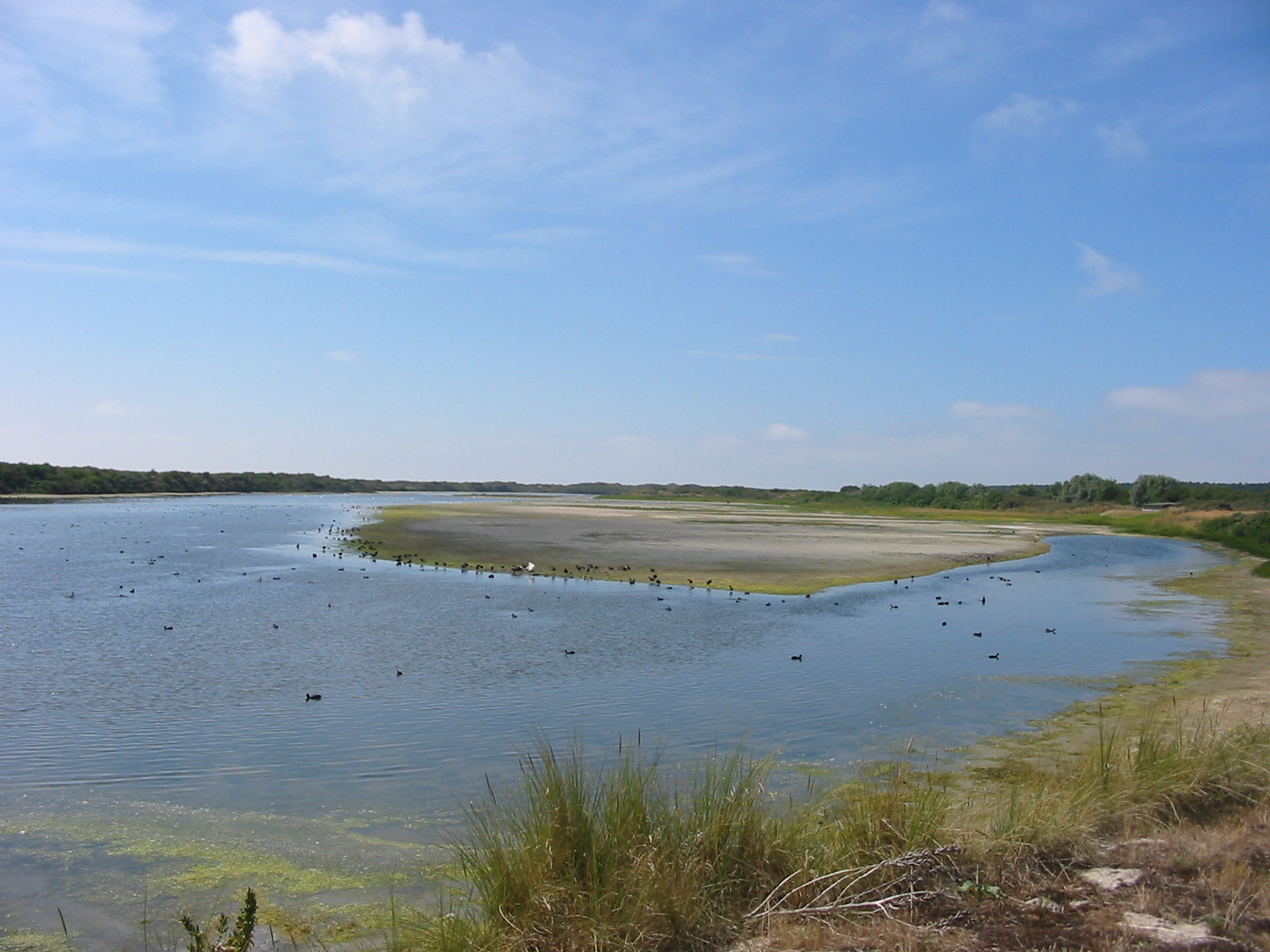
The Marquenterre bird sanctuary at the mouth of the river

== Navigation and canals ==
The construction of the Canal de la Somme began in 1770 and reached completion in 1843. It is 156 km (97 mi) long, beginning at St.Simon and opening into the Bay of the Somme. From St.Simon to Froissy (near Bray sur Somme, south of Albert), the canal is alongside the river. Thence to the sea, the river is partly river and partly navigation. From Abbeville, it is diverted through the silted, former estuary, to Saint-Valery-sur-Somme, where the maritime canal, once called the canal du Duc d'Angoulême enters the English Channel.

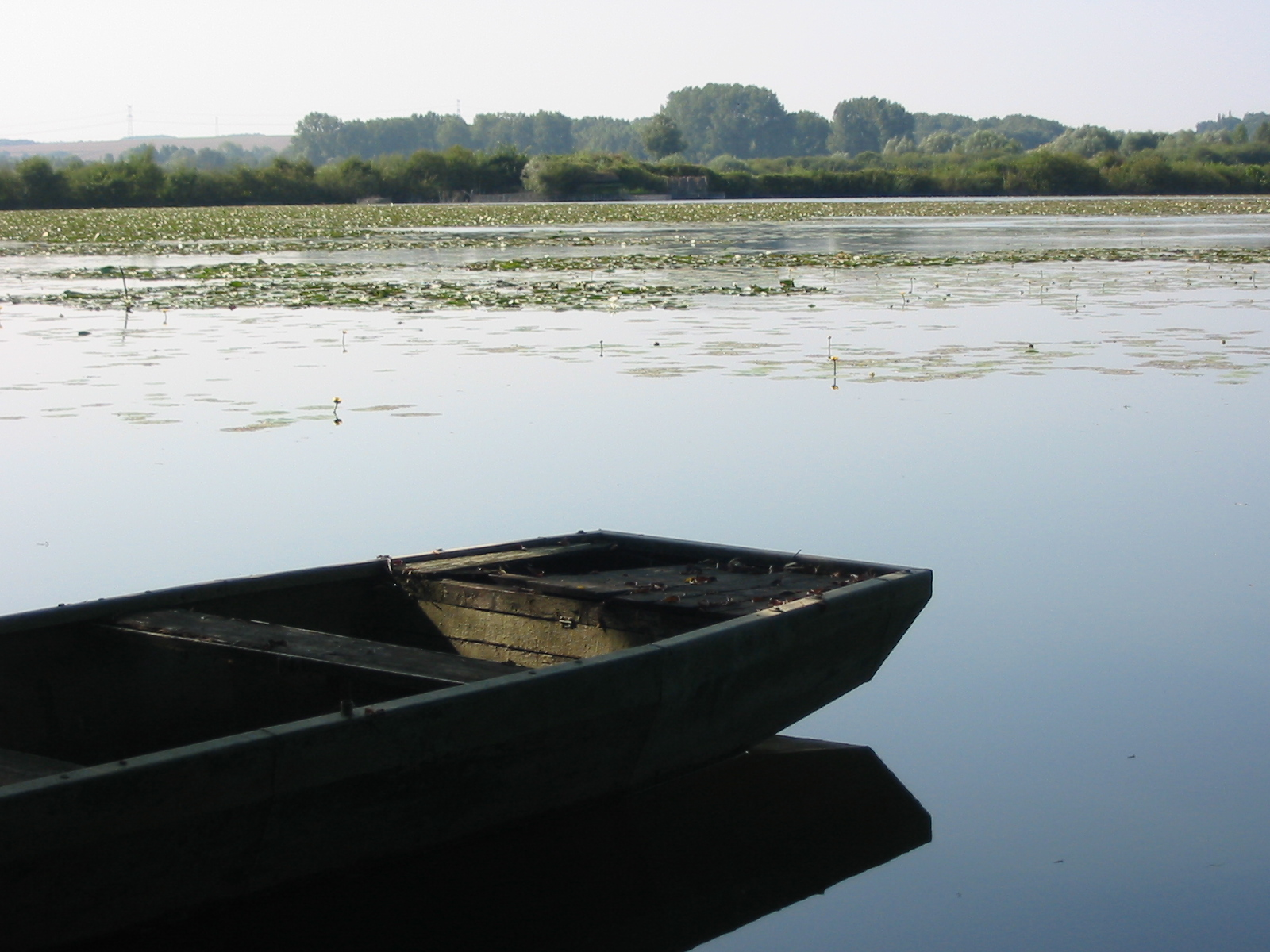
An example of the lakes formed in the fen of the valley bottom. They attract wildfowlers and anglers.

The St Quentin Canal, famous for the 1918 battle, links the Somme to northern France and Belgium and southward to the Oise. The Canal du Nord also links the Somme to the Oise, at Noyon, thence to Paris.
