= Morcourt, Aisne =

Morcourt
- Commune
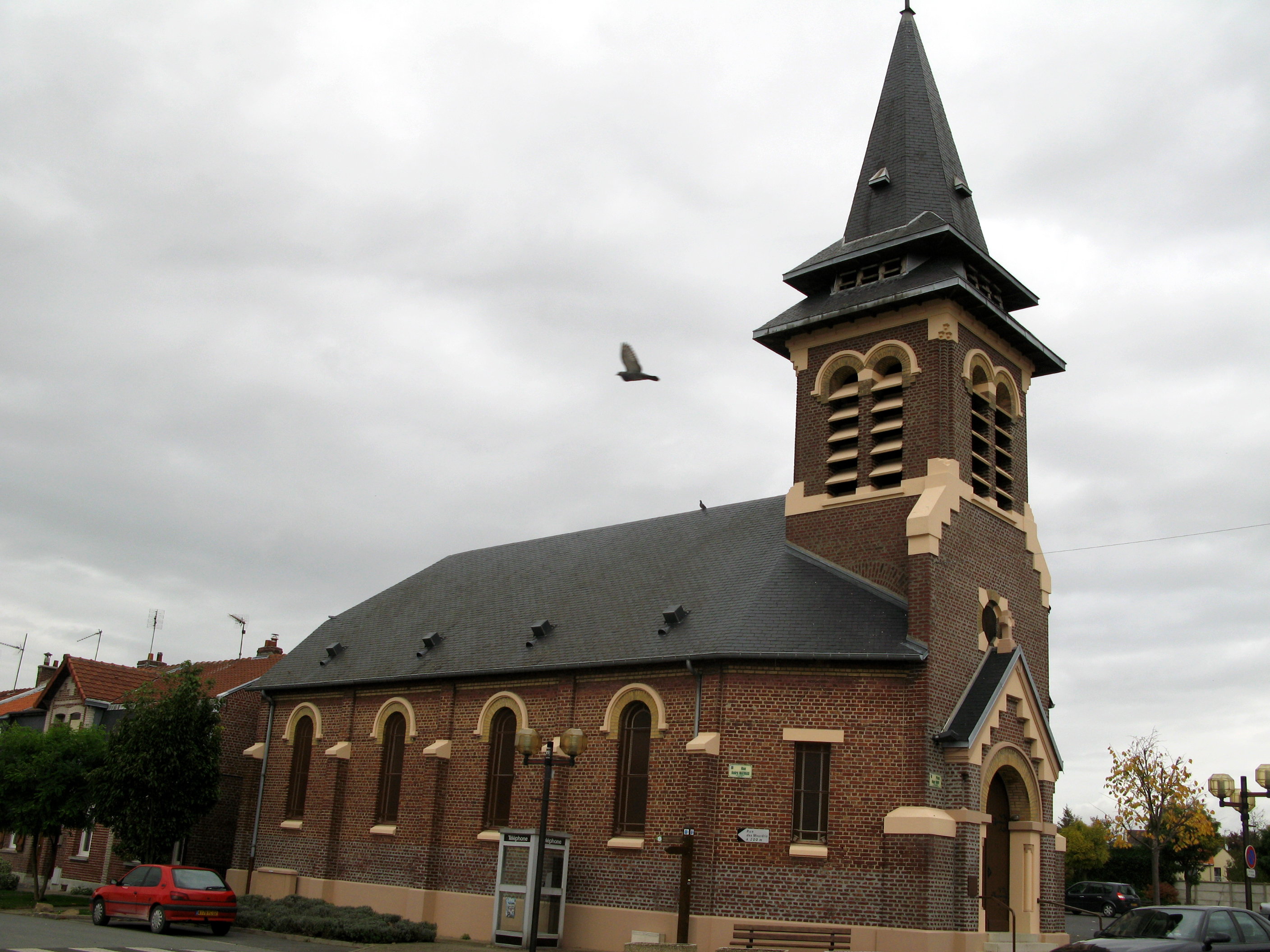
- The church of Morcourt
- Location of Morcourt
- Location within France Location within Hauts-de-France
- Coordinates: 49°52′37″N 3°19′23″E
- Country: France
- Region: Hauts-de-France
- Department: Aisne
- Arrondissement: Saint-Quentin
- Canton: Saint-Quentin-2
- Intercommunality: CA Saint-Quentinois

Government
  - Mayor (2026–32): Rose-Marie Bucek
- Area^{1}: 6.07 km^{2} (2.34 sq mi)
- Elevation: 82 m (269 ft)
- Highest elevation: 134 m (440 ft)
- Lowest elevation: 72 m (236 ft)
- Population (2023): 544
  - Density: 89.6/km^{2} (232/sq mi)
- Time zone: UTC+01:00 (CET)
  - Summer (DST): UTC+02:00 (CEST)
- INSEE/Postal code: 02525 /02100
- ^{1} French Land Register data, which excludes lakes, ponds, glaciers > 1 km^{2} (0.386 sq mi or 247 acres) and river estuaries.

Morcourt (French pronunciation: [mɔʁkuʁ]) is a commune in the Aisne department in Hauts-de-France in northern France.

== Population ==
Historical population
| Year | Pop. | ±% p.a. |
|---|---|---|
| 1968 | 398 | — |
| 1975 | 586 | +5.68% |
| 1982 | 562 | −0.60% |
| 1990 | 580 | +0.39% |
| 1999 | 578 | −0.04% |
| 2007 | 589 | +0.24% |
| 2012 | 595 | +0.20% |
| 2017 | 574 | −0.72% |
| 2023 | 544 | −0.89% |
Source: INSEE

== See also ==
- Communes of the Aisne department
