= Marcy, Aisne =

Marcy
- Commune
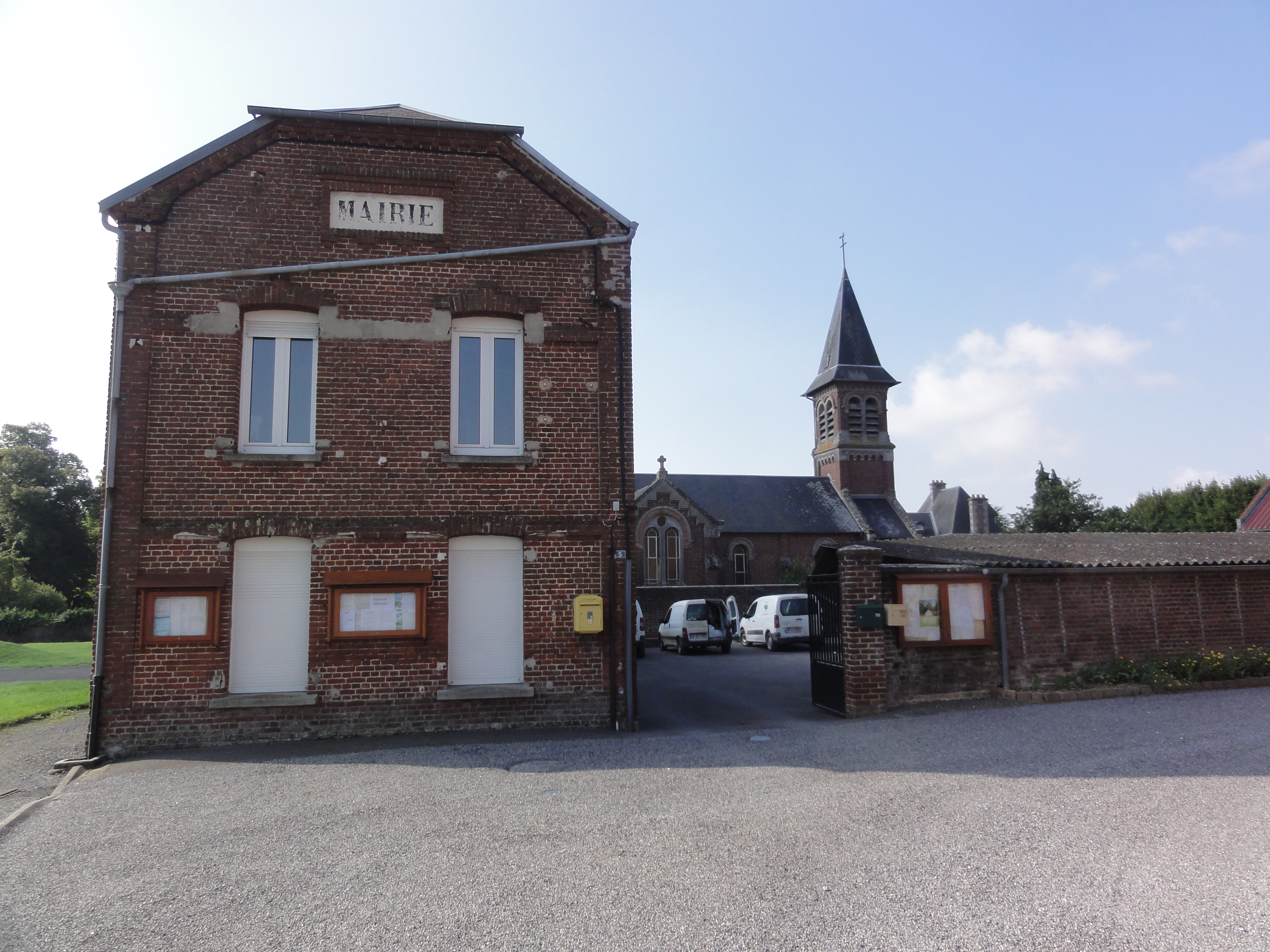
- The town hall of Marcy
- Location of Marcy
- Location within France Location within Hauts-de-France
- Coordinates: 49°51′N 3°24′E
- Country: France
- Region: Hauts-de-France
- Department: Aisne
- Arrondissement: Saint-Quentin
- Canton: Saint-Quentin-2
- Intercommunality: CA Saint-Quentinois

Government
  - Mayor (2026–32): Freddy Gillot
- Area^{1}: 7.3 km^{2} (2.8 sq mi)
- Elevation: 128 m (420 ft)
- Highest elevation: 128 m (420 ft)
- Lowest elevation: 74 m (243 ft)
- Population (2023): 151
  - Density: 21/km^{2} (54/sq mi)
- Time zone: UTC+01:00 (CET)
  - Summer (DST): UTC+02:00 (CEST)
- INSEE/Postal code: 02459 /02720
- ^{1} French Land Register data, which excludes lakes, ponds, glaciers > 1 km^{2} (0.386 sq mi or 247 acres) and river estuaries.

Marcy (French pronunciation: [maʁsi]) is a commune in the Aisne department in Hauts-de-France in northern France.

== Population ==
Historical population
Year	Pop.	±% p.a.
1968	205	—
1975	179	−1.92%
1982	169	−0.82%
1990	178	+0.65%
1999	184	+0.37%
2007	165	−1.35%
2012	170	+0.60%
2017	173	+0.35%
2023	151	−2.24%
Source: INSEE

== See also ==
- Communes of the Aisne department
