= Fonsomme =

- Commune
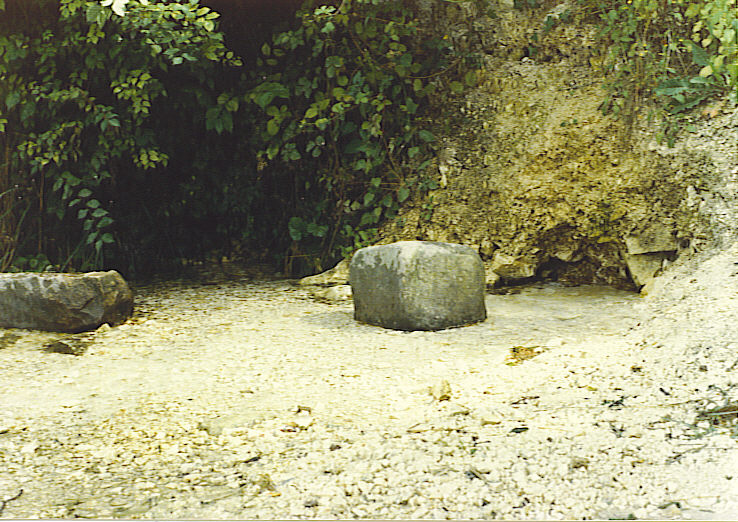
- Source of the Somme

- Coat of arms
- Location of Fonsomme
- Location within France Location within Hauts-de-France
- Coordinates: 49°54′11″N 3°24′01″E
- Country: France
- Region: Hauts-de-France
- Department: Aisne
- Arrondissement: Saint-Quentin
- Canton: Saint-Quentin-2
- Intercommunality: CA Saint-Quentinois

Government
  - Mayor (2026–32): Thierry Mazzini
- Area^{1}: 9.6 km^{2} (3.7 sq mi)
- Elevation: 85 m (279 ft)
- Highest elevation: 131 m (430 ft)
- Lowest elevation: 82 m (269 ft)
- Population (2023): 518
  - Density: 54/km^{2} (140/sq mi)
- Time zone: UTC+01:00 (CET)
  - Summer (DST): UTC+02:00 (CEST)
- INSEE/Postal code: 02319 /02110
- ^{1} French Land Register data, which excludes lakes, ponds, glaciers > 1 km^{2} (0.386 sq mi or 247 acres) and river estuaries.

Fonsomme (French pronunciation: [fɔ̃sɔm]; before 2011: Fonsommes) is a commune in the Aisne department in Hauts-de-France in northern France.

== Geography ==
The source of the river Somme lies in the commune.

== Population ==
Historical population
Year	Pop.	±% p.a.
1968	564	—
1975	538	−0.67%
1982	494	−1.21%
1990	545	+1.24%
1999	554	+0.18%
2007	507	−1.10%
2012	530	+0.89%
2017	469	−2.42%
2023	518	+1.67%
Source: INSEE

== See also ==
- Communes of the Aisne department
