= Fokker D.I =

World War I fighter aircraft

Fokker D.I and B.III
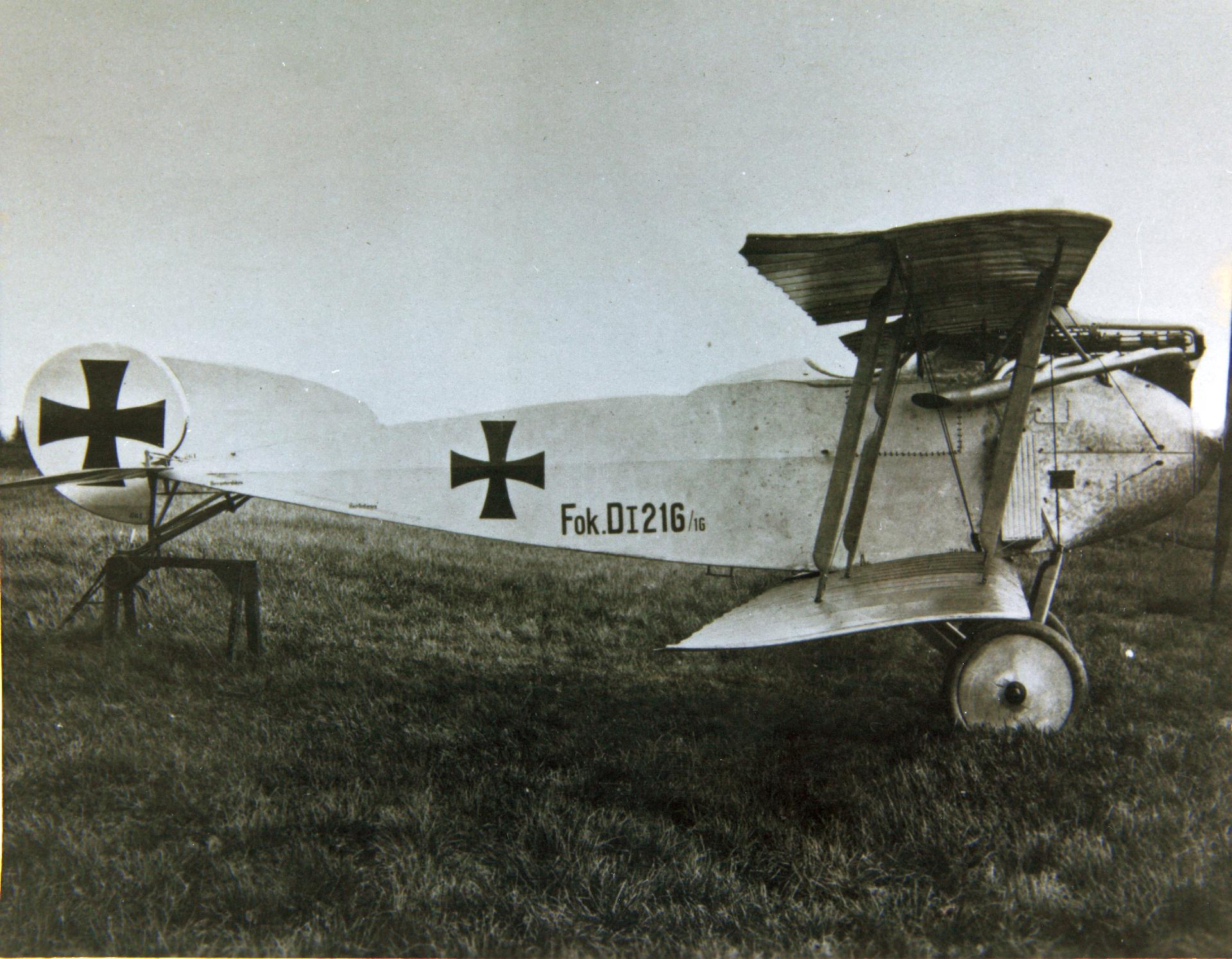

General information
- Type: Fighter aircraft
- Manufacturer: Fokker-Flugzeugwerke
- Designer: Martin Kreutzer
- Number built: 144

History
- Manufactured: July 1916
- Introduction date: 1916
- Variants: Fokker D.II, D.III and D.IV.

The Fokker D.I (company designation M.18) was a development of the D.II fighter. The D.I was also flown in Austro-Hungarian service as a fighter trainer aircraft under the designation B.III. Confusing the matter further, both the D.II and D.I arrived at the Front in German service at similar times, in July–August 1916. The main designer was Martin Kreutzer.

== Design and development ==
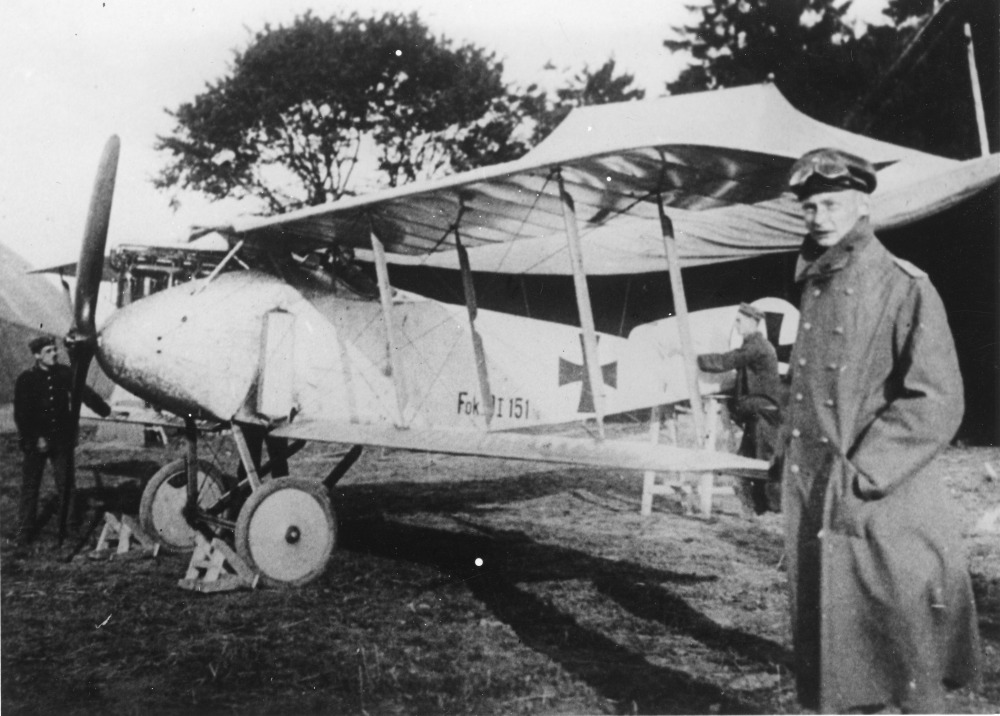
Fokker D.I 151-1916

Similar to the D.II, the D.I was an unstaggered single-bay, or Einstielig equal-span biplane. The upper fuselage was initially parallel with the upper wing and was fitted with the 75 kW (101 hp) Mercedes D.I six-cylinder water-cooled engine.

Control was achieved using wing-warping. The wings were also tested in twin-bay (Zweistielig) form. To improve visibility, the center section was cut back and the wings were slightly staggered and the top wing raised slightly.

These improvements were retained, and the airplane was ordered into production with an 89 kW (119 hp) Mercedes D.II inline engine and a single synchronized 7.92 mm (.312 in) lMG 08 machine gun. The Austro-Hungarian B.IIIs, serialled 04.11 to 04.27, retained the Mercedes D.I engine, and some were armed with a free-firing Schwarzlose MG M.07/12 machine gun mounted above the centre-section.

== Operational history ==
Deliveries began in July 1916 and 90 D.I fighters were delivered to the German Fliegertruppen and 17 B.III fighter trainers to the Austro-Hungarian Luftfahrttruppen, eight of which were license-built by the Magyar Általános Gépgyár (MAG) in Hungary.

One Austro-Hungarian B III was experimentally fitted with a 119 kW (160 hp) Mercedes D.III engine. Another had ailerons instead of wing warping, and still another had long span, swept back wings.

Compared with aircraft in service at that time, such as the Albatros D.II and the Nieuport 11, this Fokker's design and performance were decidedly unimpressive, and further production did not take place.

The D.I was the basis for the Fokker D.IV.

== Operators ==
Austria-Hungary
Austro-Hungarian Imperial and Royal Aviation Troops
German Empire
Luftstreitkräfte
Turkey

- Ottoman Air Force

== Specifications (D.I) ==
Data from German Aircraft of the First World War

General characteristics

- Crew: 1
- Length: 6.3 m (20 ft 8 in)
- Wingspan: 9.05 m (29 ft 8 in)
- Height: 2.55 m (8 ft 4 in)
- Wing area: 20 m^{2} (220 sq ft)
- Empty weight: 463 kg (1,021 lb)
- Gross weight: 670 kg (1,477 lb)
- Powerplant: 1 × Mercedes D.II 6-cylinder water-cooled in-line piston engine, 89 kW (119 hp)
- Propellers: 2-bladed fixed-pitch propeller

Performance

- Maximum speed: 150 km/h (93 mph, 81 kn)
- Endurance: 1 hour 30 minutes
- Rate of climb: 3.33 m/s (656 ft/min)
- Wing loading: 33.5 kg/m^{2} (6.9 lb/sq ft)
- Power/mass: 0.17 kg/hp

Armament

- Guns:
- D.I 1 × synchronised forward-firing 7.92 mm (0.312 in) LMG 08/15 machine gun
- B.III optional forward-firing 8 mm (0.315 in) Schwarzlose MG M.07/12 machine gun mounted above the centre-section

== See also ==
Related development

- Fokker D.II
- Fokker D.IV

Aircraft of comparable role, configuration, and era

- Albatros D.I
- Halberstadt D.II
- Nieuport 11

Related lists

- List of military aircraft of Germany
- List of fighter aircraft
