= Fontaine-Notre-Dame, Aisne =

Fontaine-Notre-Dame
- Commune
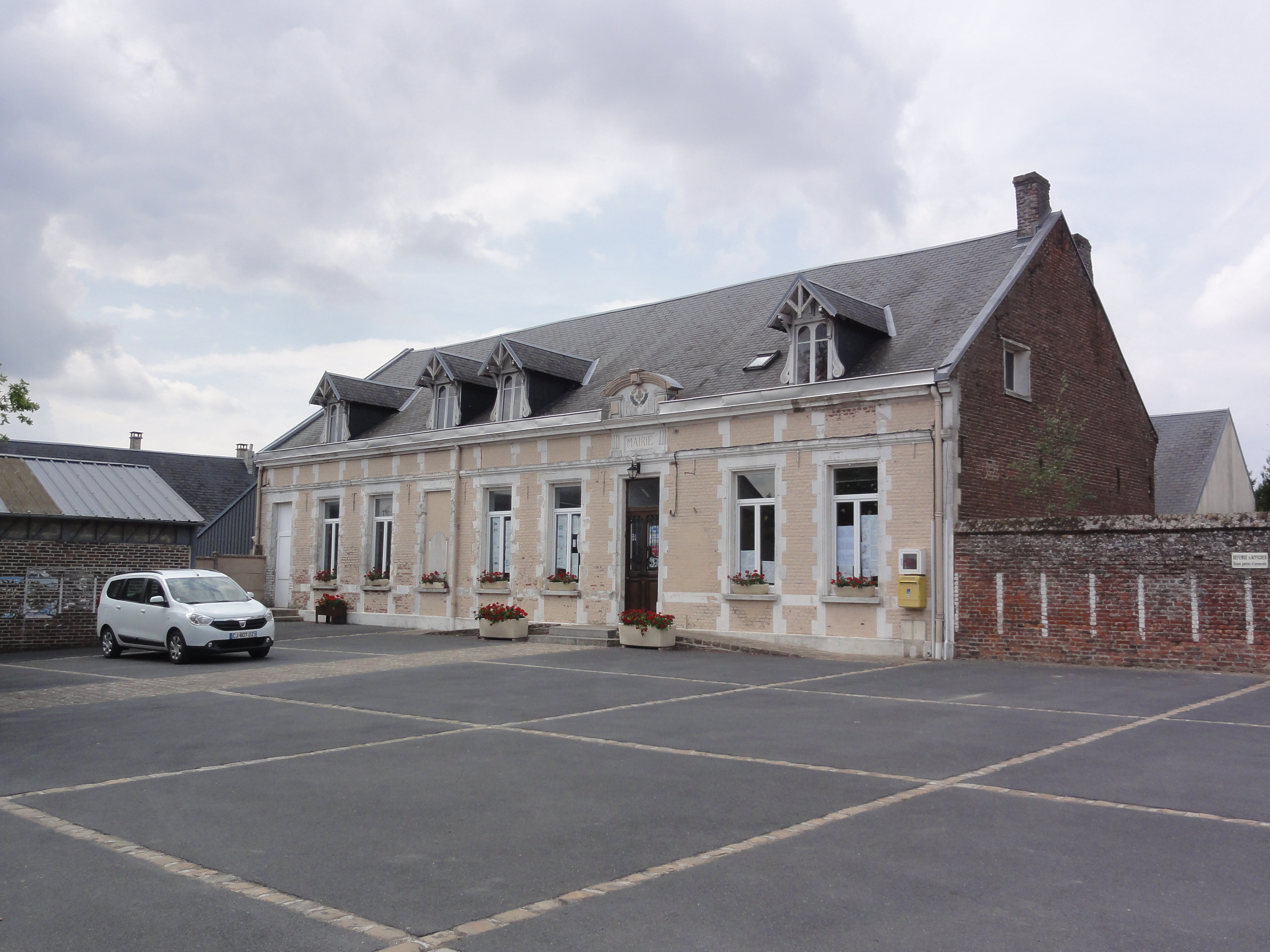
- The town hall of Fontaine-Notre-Dame

- Coat of arms
- Location of Fontaine-Notre-Dame
- Location within France Location within Hauts-de-France
- Coordinates: 49°53′06″N 3°25′46″E
- Country: France
- Region: Hauts-de-France
- Department: Aisne
- Arrondissement: Saint-Quentin
- Canton: Saint-Quentin-2
- Intercommunality: CA Saint-Quentinois

Government
  - Mayor (2026–32): Thierry Defrance
- Area^{1}: 11.9 km^{2} (4.6 sq mi)
- Elevation: 150 m (490 ft)
- Highest elevation: 142 m (466 ft)
- Lowest elevation: 77 m (253 ft)
- Population (2023): 378
  - Density: 31.8/km^{2} (82.3/sq mi)
- Time zone: UTC+01:00 (CET)
  - Summer (DST): UTC+02:00 (CEST)
- INSEE/Postal code: 02322 /02110
- ^{1} French Land Register data, which excludes lakes, ponds, glaciers > 1 km^{2} (0.386 sq mi or 247 acres) and river estuaries.

Fontaine-Notre-Dame is a commune in the Aisne department in Hauts-de-France in northern France.

== Population ==
Historical population
Year	Pop.	±% p.a.
1968	409	—
1975	376	−1.19%
1982	418	+1.52%
1990	424	+0.18%
1999	382	−1.15%
2007	391	+0.29%
2012	389	−0.10%
2017	389	+0.00%
2023	378	−0.48%
Source: INSEE

== See also ==
- Communes of the Aisne department
