= List of aerial victories of Adolf Ritter von Tutschek =

Adolf Ritter von Tutschek (1891–1918) was a German First World War fighter ace credited with 27 confirmed aerial victories. After scoring his first three aerial victories flying combat with Jagdstaffel 2 in early 1917, he transferred to command of another fighter squadron, Jagdstaffel 12. Tutschek shot down another 20 enemy aircraft by 11 August 1917. After recovery from a severe wound, he was promoted to command a fighter wing, Jagdgeschwader II, on 1 February 1918. He scored four more victories there before being killed in action on 15 March 1918.

== List of victories ==
His victories are reported in chronological order, which is not necessarily the order or dates the victories were confirmed by headquarters. Downed pilots are listed before their aerial observers.

This list is complete for entries, though obviously not for all details. Background data was abstracted from Above the Lines: The Aces and Fighter Units of the German Air Service, Naval Air Service and Flanders Marine Corps, 1914–1918, ISBN 978-0-948817-73-1, p. 219; Under the Guns of the Kaiser's Aces: Bohme, Muller, von Tutschek and Wolff: The Complete Records of Their Victories and Victims, ISBN 9781904010029, pp. 100–137; and The Aerodrome webpage on Adolf Ritter von Tutschek . Abbreviations were expanded by the editor creating this list.

No.	Date	Time	Foe	Unit	Location	Casualties
1	6 March 1917	1630 hours	Airco DH.2	No. 32 Squadron RFC	Beugny, France	Ace Maxmillian Mare-Montembault POW
2	31 March 1917	0900 hours	Nieuport		Northeast of Lens	Identification uncertain
3	6 April 1917	0830 hours	Royal Aircraft Factory FE.2d	No. 57 Squadron RFC	Anneux, France	Raymond Schreiber, Martin Lewis POW. Werner Voss lost a coin toss for this victory claim.
4	30 April 1917	0755 hours	Royal Aircraft Factory FE.2d	No. 18 Squadron RFC	Izel, France	Edward Jennings, John Robinson Lingard POW.
5	1 May 1917	1140 hours	Sopwith Pup	No. 3 Naval Squadron, RNAS	Cantaing, France	Arthur Mather POW
6	4 May 1917	2040 hours	Sopwith Pup	No. 3 Naval Squadron RNAS	Baralle, France	Harry Murton POW
Unconfirmed	10 May 1917	1320 hours	Sopwith Pup		West of Monchy, France	Victim not identified
7	11 May 1917	1540 hours	Sopwith Pup	No. 3 Naval Squadron RNAS	Croisselles, France	Hubert Broad WIA, crashlanded behind friendly lines
8	12 May 1917	1050 hours	Sopwith Pup	No. 66 Squadron RFC	Baralle, France	John Ross Robertson KIA
9	19 May 1917	0905 hours	Sopwith Triplane	No. 1 Naval Squadron RNAS	Dury, France	Geoffrey Bowman KIA
10	20 May 1917	1110 hours	SPAD S.VII	No. 23 Squadron RFC	Riencourt, France	Hyde Garrett KIA
11	3 July 1917	1030 hours	Sopwith 1 1/2 Strutter		North of Vaulx, France	Victim unidentified
12	11 July 1917	1815 hours	Royal Aircraft Factory RE.8	No. 5 Squadron RFC	Thelus, France	Victim unidentified
13	11 July 1917	1845 hours	Royal Aircraft Factory FE.2d	No. 25 Squadron RFC	Monchy	Frederick Sargant WIA. He and James Herbert Kirk escaped crash, returned to British lines.
14	12 July 1917	1800 hours	Observation balloon	Section 36, 16th Company, 1st Balloon Wing	Northwest of Lens	
15	13 July 1917	0800 hours	Martinsyde G.102	No. 27 Squadron RFC	Noeux-les-Mines	Harold Wilkins crashed unhurt within British lines
16	15 July 1917	2025 hours	Nieuport 23	No. 60 Squadron RFC	South of Douai	Gerald Parkes POW
17	21 July 1917	2130 hours	Nieuport 27	No. 40 Squadron RFC	South of Moeuvres, France	Frederick Rook KIA
18	23 July 1917	1755 hours	Observation balloon	20th Section, Kite Balloon Wing, RFC	Neuville, France	No casualties
19	28 July 1917	0730 hours	Sopwith Triplane	No. 8 Naval Squadron RNAS	Mericourt, France	Future ace Edward Crundall recovered at treetop level and hedgehopped home
20	28 July 1917	1040 hours	Nieuport 17	No. 40 Squadron RFC	Northeast of Lens	Future ace John Henry Tudhope returned unhurt but with badly shotup plane
21	29 July 1917	0805 hours	Royal Aircraft Factory SE.5a	No. 60 Squadron RFC	Henin-Lietard	William Henry Gunner KIA
22	11 August 1917	0910 hours	Bristol F.2 Fighter	No. 22 Squadron RFC	East of Biache	Percy Chambers DOW, Walter Richman WIA/POW
23	11 August 1917	1830 hours	Bristol F.2 Fighter	No. 22 Squadron RFC	West of Courcelles, France	Arthur Ward, Kenneth Holmes both KIA
24	26 February 1918	1120 hours	SPAD S.VII	No. 23 Squadron RFC	Northeast of Laon, France	David Colquhoun Doyle POW
25	1 March 1918	0845 hours	Observation balloon		Terny	French kite balloon
26	6 March 1918	1445 hours	Royal Aircraft Factory SE.5a	No. 24 Squadron RFC	Nertancourt	Arthur Wigan POW
27	10 March 1918	1745 hours	SPAD S.XIII	Escadrille Spa.86, Service Aéronautique	Chavignon, France	Eugene Vollod KIA
