= Adolf Ritter von Tutschek =

German soldier and aviator

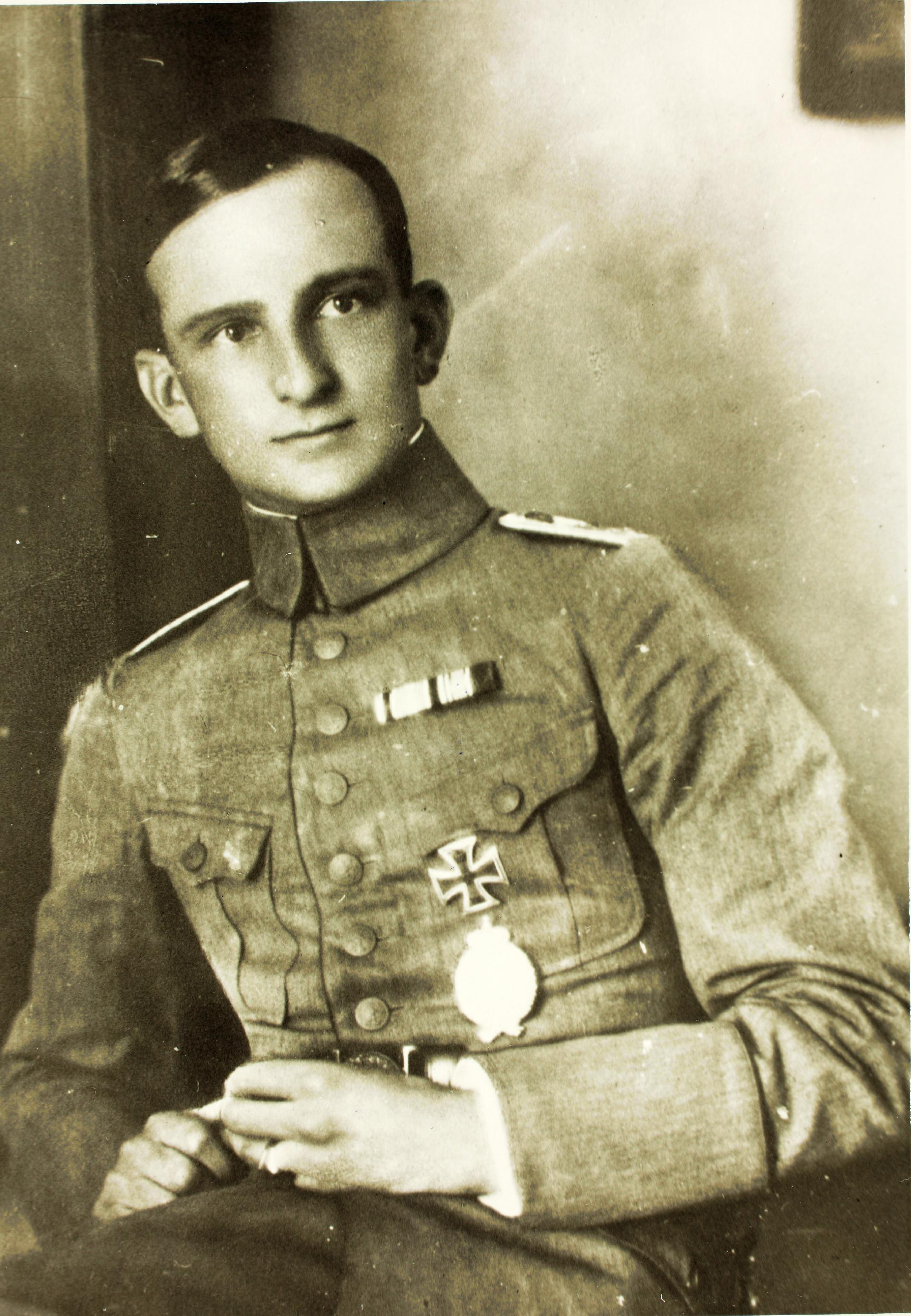
- Born: 16 May 1891; Ingolstadt, Germany
- Died: 15 March 1918 (aged 26); Near Brancourt, France
- Military career
- Allegiance: German Empire
- Branch: Infantry, Luftstreitkräfte
- Service years: 1910–1918
- Rank: Hauptmann (Captain)
- Units: 3rd Bavarian Infantry, Flieger-Abteilung 6b, Jagdstaffel 2, Jagdstaffel 12, Jagdgeschwader II
- Commands: Jagdstaffel 12; Jagdgeschwader II
- Awards: Prussian Pour le Mérite, Bavarian Military Order of Max Joseph, Prussian House Order of Hohenzollern, Bavarian Military Merit Order, 4th Class with Swords; Prussian Iron Cross, both Second and First Class

Adolf Ritter von Tutschek (born Adolf von Tutschek)(16 May 1891 – 15 March 1918) PlM, MOMJ was a professional soldier turned aviator. As German air strategy turned towards concentrated air power, he was entrusted with one of the world's first fighter wings.

== Early life and infantry service ==
Adolf von Tutschek was born in Ingolstadt on 16 May 1891. He was the son of Karl von Tutschek, Chief Medical Officer to the Royal Bavarian Military Academy. The elder Tutschek died when his son was eight years old, sparking a family relocation to Augsburg to live near his mother's relatives. Adolf von Tutschek attended Saint Anna High School in Augsburg until 1910, then joined the Royal Bavarian Cadet School. After graduation in October 1912, he joined in the "Prince Carl of Bavaria" 3rd Royal Bavarian Infantry Regiment as a Fahnenjunker (officer aspirant). He was later commissioned as Leutnant (second lieutenant). He started his field service in World War I with Prussian Fusilier Regiment No. 40 in Vosges, but soon was transferred back to the Bavarian 3rd Infantry Regiment. His service on the Western Front was valorous enough to earn him the Prussian Iron Cross Second Class on 26 November 1914, and the Bavarian Military Merit Order, 4th Class with Swords, on 10 December 1914. At some point after this, he was transferred to the Eastern Front.

On 2 May 1915, Tutschek was wounded by a hand grenade, temporarily removing him from combat. After his return to the front, on 25 July 1915 he led an attack on a superior Russian force. Fighting devolved into bitter hand-to-hand combat before Tutschek and the Germans prevailed over the Russians. They held the captured position through repeated counterattacks for the next 17 days, until 10 August. Tutschek's award of the Prussian First Class Iron Cross also came through during this period, on 30 July. For his leadership during this battle, Tutschek won Bavaria's highest military honor, the Knight's Cross of the Military Order of Max Joseph; its recipients were paid a lifetime honorarium and ennobled by the insertion of "Ritter" or "Ritter von" into their names. Additionally, on 30 July, he was granted the Prussian Iron Cross First Class.

On 28 October 1915, Austria awarded Tutschek the Military Merit Cross, 3rd Class, with War Decorations. Then the Military Order of Max Joseph was actually granted to him on 31 January 1916. Also in January, he was promoted to Oberleutnant (first lieutenant), and reassigned as battalion adjutant. He was also transferred back to the Western Front.

== Aerial service ==
In July 1916, von Tutschek attended flight school at Schleissheim with Fliegerersatz-Abteilung 1 (Replacement Detachment 1). In October 1916 he returned to the front flying initially with Flieger-Abteilung 6b (Flier Detachment 6b), an artillery spotting unit.

He was then posted to fly single-seat fighters with Jagdstaffel 2 (Fighter Squadron 2) in January 1917. Over the next three months, he had three confirmed victories. His first triumph, on 6 March 1917, was over the Airco DH.2 of ace Lt. Maxmillian Mare-Montembault of No 32 Squadron RFC, who was shot down and captured.

On 28 April, von Tutschek assumed command of Prussian Jagdstaffel 12 based at Epinoy upon the death of its commander. One of the pilots there was future Jagdstaffel 52 commanding officer and ace Paul Billik. Von Tutschek's appointment was unusual in that although a Prussian raised Jagdstaffel, von Tutschek was a Bavarian. On 30 April, von Tutschek allayed any Prussian suspicion of Bavarians by sprinting to his airplane through falling bombs during a raid on their home airfield; he led a flight into the air into a night pursuit of the bombers. He shot down one of the raiders, a Royal Aircraft Factory FE.2b of No. 57 Squadron RFC thus scoring a victory on his first flight with his new command.

His personal aircraft color scheme was ink black overall with a white propeller spinner and a square white background for the Maltese cross tail markings.

In May he was credited with shooting down a trio of Sopwith Pups of No. 3 Naval Squadron RNAS. However, his 11 May victim recovered from an apparently uncontrollable spin and returned to base despite being shot through the mouth.

On 20 May, von Tutschek scored his tenth victory in a long duel with a SPAD of No. 23 Squadron RFC that crashed in flames.

On 26 May, von Tutschek left for leave, and returning on 26 June attacked two Sopwith 1 1/2 Strutters, though the return fire damaged von Tutschek's Albatros and forced him to land. In combat with 60 Squadron Nieuports on 29 June his engine was again damaged, and he force-landed near Cantin.

He scored 11 victories in July. On the 15th, he downed one of Captain Billy Bishop's 60 Squadron's comrades, Lt. GAH Parkes, for victory number 16. On the 28th, he shot down English 7-victory ace Flt. Sub-Lt. E. D. Crundall of Naval 8 Squadron RNAS (who survived), on a morning sortie. In the afternoon, he claimed another ace, 40 Squadron's Captain John Henry Tudhope (10 victories), who returned to base, damaged.

On 11 July, he was awarded the Royal House Order of Hohenzollern. On 3 August 1917, after 21 victories, he was awarded Germany's premier decoration for valor, the Pour le Mérite.

On 11 August 1917, after victory 23, von Tutschek was severely wounded in the shoulder by Flt Lt Charles Dawson Booker of Naval 8 Squadron. If Viktor Schobinger had not intervened and shot Booker down, von Tutschek would probably have been killed.

With his lower right shoulder blade shattered, von Tutschek took six months to recover and spent the time writing a memoir of his flying experiences, Stürme und Luftsiege (Attacks and Air Victories). His edited letters would also appear in print at a later date.

== Higher command and downfall ==
Returning to active service in February 1918, Hauptmann von Tutschek was given command of the new Jagdgeschwader II, consisting of four Jagdstaffeln--Jagdstaffel 13, Jagdstaffel 15, and Jagdstaffel 19, as well as Jagdstaffel 12. He was pitched into the challenge of gearing up and staffing a new organization; he expressed his dissatisfaction with progress in his diary. The new unit was short of aircraft, parts, and fuel and faced a numerically superior Royal Flying Corps.

One of his prerequisites was a new airplane to fly. He was delighted with his brand-new Fokker Dr.I triplane. He first test flew it on 17 February 1918, and raved about it in his diary "..a tremendous machine climbs terrifically." He flew it to the last four victories of his career, on 26 February, and 1st (a balloon) 6th and 10 March.

On the last day of February, he narrowly survived a mid-air collision with Lt. Paul Blumenbach flying another triplane. Both pilots managed to coax their damaged machines to safe landings.

On 15 March 1918, South African future 10-victory ace Lieutenant Harold Redler of the Royal Flying Corps' No. 24 Squadron shot down von Tutschek. The German spun down in his green triplane (SNo.404/17) out of control. There are two versions of what followed.

One version of his death states when found he still had his wiping cloth tucked through his buttonhole and under his safety harness; as it was his habit to wipe his goggles clean going into battle, it was deduced he had been caught unaware.

A second version, less likely, claimed that one of Redler's bullets creased Tutschek's head and that the wound caused him to land. He supposedly waved to his wingmen as they circled, but was later found dead next to his plane.

His tally of 27 victories (24 with Jagdstaffel 12 or Jagdgeschwader II) would amount to a quarter of the 104 victories for his parent Jagdstaffel 12.

== Decorations and awards ==
- Military Order of Max Joseph (25 February 1916)
- Iron Cross of 1914, 1st and 2nd class
- Knight's Cross of the Royal House Order of Hohenzollern with Swords (11 July 1917)
- Pour le Mérite (3 August 1917)
- Military Merit Order, 3rd class with Crown and Swords (Bavaria)

== List of victories of Adolf Ritter von Tutschek ==
His victories are reported in chronological order, which is not necessarily the order or dates the victories were confirmed by headquarters. Downed pilots are listed before their aerial observers.

This list is complete for entries, though obviously not for all details. Background data was abstracted from Above the Lines: The Aces and Fighter Units of the German Air Service, Naval Air Service and Flanders Marine Corps, 1914–1918, ISBN 978-0-948817-73-1, p. 219; Under the Guns of the Kaiser's Aces: Bohme, Muller, von Tutschek and Wolff: The Complete Records of Their Victories and Victims, ISBN 9781904010029, pp. 100–137; and The Aerodrome webpage on Adolf Ritter von Tutschek . Abbreviations were expanded by the editor creating this list.

No.	Date	Time	Foe	Unit	Location	Casualties
1	6 March 1917	1630 hours	Airco DH.2	No. 32 Squadron RFC	Beugny, France	Ace Maxmillian Mare-Montembault POW
2	31 March 1917	0900 hours	Nieuport		Northeast of Lens	Identification uncertain
3	6 April 1917	0830 hours	Royal Aircraft Factory FE.2d	No. 57 Squadron RFC	Anneux, France	Raymond Schreiber, Martin Lewis POW. Werner Voss lost a coin toss for this victory claim.
4	30 April 1917	0755 hours	Royal Aircraft Factory FE.2d	No. 18 Squadron RFC	Izel, France	Edward Jennings, John Robinson Lingard POW.
5	1 May 1917	1140 hours	Sopwith Pup	No. 3 Naval Squadron, RNAS	Cantaing, France	Arthur Mather POW
6	4 May 1917	2040 hours	Sopwith Pup	No. 3 Naval Squadron RNAS	Baralle, France	Harry Murton POW
Unconfirmed	10 May 1917	1320 hours	Sopwith Pup		West of Monchy, France	Victim not identified
7	11 May 1917	1540 hours	Sopwith Pup	No. 3 Naval Squadron RNAS	Croisselles, France	Hubert Broad WIA, crashlanded behind friendly lines
8	12 May 1917	1050 hours	Sopwith Pup	No. 66 Squadron RFC	Baralle, France	John Ross Robertson KIA
9	19 May 1917	0905 hours	Sopwith Triplane	No. 1 Naval Squadron RNAS	Dury, France	Geoffrey Bowman KIA
10	20 May 1917	1110 hours	SPAD S.VII	No. 23 Squadron RFC	Riencourt, France	Hyde Garrett KIA
11	3 July 1917	1030 hours	Sopwith 1 1/2 Strutter		North of Vaulx, France	Victim unidentified
12	11 July 1917	1815 hours	Royal Aircraft Factory RE.8	No. 5 Squadron RFC	Thelus, France	Victim unidentified
13	11 July 1917	1845 hours	Royal Aircraft Factory FE.2d	No. 25 Squadron RFC	Monchy	Frederick Sargant WIA. He and James Herbert Kirk escaped crash, returned to British lines.
14	12 July 1917	1800 hours	Observation balloon	Section 36, 16th Company, 1st Balloon Wing	Northwest of Lens	
15	13 July 1917	0800 hours	Martinsyde G.102	No. 27 Squadron RFC	Noeux-les-Mines	Harold Wilkins crashed unhurt within British lines
16	15 July 1917	2025 hours	Nieuport 23	No. 60 Squadron RFC	South of Douai	Gerald Parkes POW
17	21 July 1917	2130 hours	Nieuport 27	No. 40 Squadron RFC	South of Moeuvres, France	Frederick Rook KIA
18	23 July 1917	1755 hours	Observation balloon	20th Section, Kite Balloon Wing, RFC	Neuville, France	No casualties
19	28 July 1917	0730 hours	Sopwith Triplane	No. 8 Naval Squadron RNAS	Mericourt, France	Future ace Edward Crundall recovered at treetop level and hedgehopped home
20	28 July 1917	1040 hours	Nieuport 17	No. 40 Squadron RFC	Northeast of Lens	Future ace John Henry Tudhope returned unhurt but with badly shotup plane
21	29 July 1917	0805 hours	Royal Aircraft Factory SE.5a	No. 60 Squadron RFC	Henin-Lietard	William Henry Gunner KIA
22	11 August 1917	0910 hours	Bristol F.2 Fighter	No. 22 Squadron RFC	East of Biache	Percy Chambers DOW, Walter Richman WIA/POW
23	11 August 1917	1830 hours	Bristol F.2 Fighter	No. 22 Squadron RFC	West of Courcelles, France	Arthur Ward, Kenneth Holmes both KIA
24	26 February 1918	1120 hours	SPAD S.VII	No. 23 Squadron RFC	Northeast of Laon, France	David Colquhoun Doyle POW
25	1 March 1918	0845 hours	Observation balloon		Terny	French kite balloon
26	6 March 1918	1445 hours	Royal Aircraft Factory SE.5a	No. 24 Squadron RFC	Nertancourt	Arthur Wigan POW
27	10 March 1918	1745 hours	SPAD S.XIII	Escadrille Spa.86, Service Aéronautique	Chavignon, France	Eugene Vollod KIA
