= List of aerial victories of Paul Billik =

Paul Billik (1891-1926) was a German fighter ace First World War credited with 31 confirmed aerial victories. He achieved his first four aerial victories while serving with Jagdstaffel 12. Following his transfer to Jagdstaffel 7, he downed an additional four enemy aircraft, concluding 1917 with a total of eight victories. Promoted to command Jagdstaffel 52 on 28 December 1917, Billik scored 23 further aerial victories as the squadron's leader, until he was shot down and taken prisoner on 10 August 1918.

== The victory list ==
Paul Billik's victories are reported in chronological order, which is not necessarily the order or dates the victories were confirmed by headquarters.

No.	Date	Time	Foe	Unit	Location	Remarks
1	30 April 1917	1810 hours	Sopwith Pup	No. 3 Naval Squadron RNAS	Roumaucourt	Ace John Joseph Malone KIA. 3 Naval became 203 Squadron RAF.
2	12 May 1917	2020 hours	SPAD S.VII	No. 19 Squadron RFC	Izel, France	
3	29 June 1917	0910 hours	Nieuport 17	No. 29 Squadron RFC	Plouvain, France	
4	3 July 1917	1920 hours	Nieuport 17	No. 60 Squadron RFC	Lagnicourt, France	
5	18 August 1917	0910 hours	Sopwith Camel	No. 4 Naval Squadron RNAS	East of Diksmuide (Dixmude), Belgium	4 Naval became 204 Squadron RAF.
6	3 September 1917	0825 hours	Sopwith Camel	No. 45 Squadron RFC	Diksmuide, Belgium	
7	6 September 1917		SPAD S.VII	No. 23 Squadron RFC	Schaapbalie	
8	12 December 1917	1630 hours	Sopwith Camel	No. 10 Naval Squadron RNAS	Diksmuide, Belgium	10 Naval became 210 Squadron RAF.
9	9 March 1918	1704 hours	Royal Aircraft Factory SE.5a	No. 40 Squadron RFC	East of Dourges, France	
10	9 March 1918	1710 hours	Royal Aircraft Factory SE.5a	No. 40 Squadron RFC	Noyelle	
11	28 March 1918	0950 hours	Sopwith Camel	No. 4 Squadron AFC	Fampoux, France	
12	28 March 1918	1000 hours	Sopwith Camel	No. 43 Squadron RFC	Sailly, France	
13	7 April 1918	1110 hours	Sopwith Camel	No. 208 Squadron RAF	East of Hulluch, France	208 Squadron formerly 8 Naval Squadron RNAS
14	3 May 1918	1400 hours	Sopwith Camel	No. 46 Squadron RAF	Estaires, France	
Unconfirmed	3 May 1918	1800 hours	Sopwith Camel		Vieille-Chapelle, France	
15	3 May 1918	1830 hours	Sopwith Dolphin	No. 19 Squadron RAF	North of La Bassée, France	
16	9 May 1918	1255 hours	Armstrong Whitworth F.K.8	No. 2 Squadron RAF	Neuve-Chapelle, France	
17	19 May 1918	1110 hours	Sopwith Dolphin	No. 19 Squadron RAF	Wingles, France	Notable ace Albert Desbrisay Carter POW
18	28 May 1918	0850 hours	Royal Aircraft Factory SE.5a	No. 41 Squadron RAF	Lacon	
19	1 June 1918	1740 hours	Royal Aircraft Factory SE.5a	No. 74 Squadron RAF	East of Merville, France	Ace William Jameson Cairnes KIA
20	24 June 1918	0820 hours	Bristol F.2 Fighter	No. 62 Squadron RAF	South of Mérignies, France	
21	25 June 1918	1826 hours	Royal Aircraft Factory SE.5a	No. 1 Squadron RAF	Doulieu, France	
22	7 July 1918	0720 hours	Airco DH.9	No. 206 Squadron RAF	Sailly-sur-la-Lys, France	206 Squadron formerly 6 Naval Squadron RNAS
23	8 July 1918	0830 hours	Bristol F.2 Fighter	No. 62 Squadron RAF	Lergies	
24	8 July 1918	0850 hours	Royal Aircraft Factory SE.5a	No. 32 Squadron RAF	Annœullin	Ace Arthur Claydon KIA
25	20 July 1918	1100 hours	Airco DH.9	No. 103 Squadron RAF	Warneton, France	
26	22 July 1918	1730 hours	Airco DH.4	No. 18 Squadron RAF	Sante	
27	25 July 1918	0840 hours	Sopwith Camel	No. 203 Squadron RAF	Givenchy	203 Squadron formerly 3 Naval Squadron RNAS
28	3 August 1918	1940 hours	Royal Aircraft Factory RE.8	No. 16 Squadron RAF	Vimy, France	
29	8 August 1918	1445 hours	Airco DH.9		Biaches, France	
30	9 August 1918	1105 hours	Airco DH.4		Baucourt	
31	9 August 1918	1240 hours	Royal Aircraft Factory SE.5a		Herleville, France	

This list is complete for entries, though obviously not for all details. Background data was abstracted from Above the Lines: The Aces and Fighter Units of the German Air Service, Naval Air Service and Flanders Marine Corps, 1914–1918, ISBN 978-0-948817-73-1, p. 74; and The Aerodrome webpage on Paul Billik . Added facts are individually cited. Abbreviations were expanded by the editor creating this list.
