= John Trollope =

John Trollope may refer to:

- John Trollope, 1st Baron Kesteven (1800–1874), former President of the Poor Law Board
- John Lightfoot Trollope (1897–1958), British First World War flying ace
- John Trollope (footballer) (born 1943), association football player
