= Wilfred Green =

Wilfred Green may refer to:

- Wilfrid Greene, 1st Baron Greene (1883–1952) British lawyer and judge
- Wilfred Green (RAF officer) (1898–1947), English World War I flying ace
- Shorty Green (Wilfred Thomas Green, 1896–1960), Canadian professional ice hockey player
