= Paul Billik =

German World War I fighter ace (1891-1926)

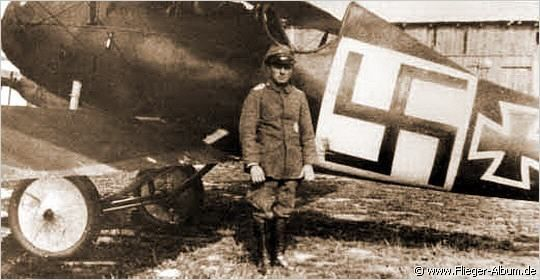
- Paul Billik and his plane
- Born: 27 March 1891; Haatsch, Province of Silesia, German Empire (now Czech Republic)
- Died: 8 March 1926 (aged 34); Berlin, Germany
- Burial place: Unknown
- Military career
- Allegiance: Germany
- Branch: Infantry, Air Service
- Service years: 1911–1918
- Rank: Leutnant
- Units: 157th Infantry Regiment; Fliegerersatz-Abteilung 4; Schutzstaffel 4; Jagdstaffel 12; Jagdstaffel 7; Jadgstaffel 52
- Commands: Jadgstaffel 52
- Awards: House Order of Hohenzollern; Iron Cross

Paul Billik (27 March 1891 – 8 March 1926) was a German World War I fighter ace credited with 31 victories. He was killed in a flying accident while pioneering civil aviation.

== His life before aviation ==
Billik was born on 27 March 1891 in Haatsch in the Silesian region of what was then Germany, and is now the Czech Republic. He attended school in Ratibor (Racibórz) until 1910.

In 1911, he joined the 157th Infantry Regiment of the 12th Division and was based in Brzeg. He was promoted to the rank of corporal, over the next two years. He was still in this regiment when World War I started, and he went into battle with them. In November 1915, he received a commission, apparently on the battlefield, which suggests uncommon courage and ability. In May 1916, he transferred to the Fliegertruppe for aviation training.

== Flying service ==
Billik trained with Fliegerersatz-Abteilung 4. From January through 26 March 1917, he flew defensive patrols with Schutzstaffel 4, and he trained to fly single seat fighter aircraft. On 1 April 1917 he joined the Prussian Jagdstaffel 12, which was later commanded by Oberleutnant Adolf Ritter von Tutschek. He was assigned an Albatros fighter to fly, which he personalized with his good luck insignia of a pre-Nazi swastika.

On 30 April, he downed a Sopwith Pup for his first victory; his victim was Royal Naval Air Service ace Flight Sub-Lieutenant John Joseph Malone. Billik downed three more opposing fighters before being transferred, with number four being on 3 July 1917. Billik was rewarded with the Iron Cross First Class.

He was reassigned the following day. His new unit was the Prussian Jagdstaffel 7, commanded by Josef Jacobs. With them, he flew a Fokker Dr.I and scored once in August, twice in September, was wounded on 7 October, and claimed victory number eight on 12 December.

As the year turned, Billik was appointed to command newly formed Prussian Jagdstaffel 52. Although most of his pilots were recent graduates of aviation training, he brought with him four pilots from his old unit, along with an aircraft color scheme of black fuselages for the Jasta's Pfalz D.IIIs. The Pfalz was an underperforming airplane, but Billik was shrewd enough to modify tactics to minimise its limitations. On 7 February 1918, Billik led his new unit, by now nicknamed the "Black Squadron", to Bersée to support 6 Armee.

Beginning on 9 March 1918, he began a five-month accumulation of successes. Scoring one or two victories per day, without the three, four, five, or six plane multiple victories of some other aces, he ran up a tally of 23 with his squadron, including successes over four British aces.

On 28 March, he shot down Captain John Lightfoot Trollope of No. 43 Squadron RAF, who survived as a prisoner of war but had to have his left hand amputated.

On 19 May, in a dogfight where the Germans were outnumbered, he downed ace Major Albert Desbrisay Carter of No. 19 Squadron RAF, who survived as a prisoner of war. Billik was slightly wounded in the encounter.

On 1 June 1918, he shot the wing off British ace Captain William Cairnes' Royal Aircraft Factory SE.5a, sending it plummeting earthward in a high-speed spin; Cairnes (of No. 74 Squadron) did not survive.

On 8 July, Billik killed ace Captain Arthur Claydon of No. 32 Squadron RAF. It was about this time that Jagdstaffel 52 finally upgraded to Fokker D.VIIs and Dr.Is.

On 25 July, Billik was awarded the Knight's Cross of the Royal House Order of Hohenzollern.

On 10 August 1918, in a swirling confused dogfight, Billik was shot down and taken as a prisoner. He had been recommended for a Pour le Merite when his score sheet reached 20 victories. This award was Germany's highest decoration for valor, and one very seldom awarded to men from humble origin or from the non-commissioned ranks. His capture prevented the honor.

In evaluating Billik's achievements as a fighter ace, he triumphed over few opponents in inferior airplanes, and many in superior ones. An Albatros or a Pfalz was considered a poorer combat aircraft than the Sopwith Camel, SE5a or Dolphin, yet Billik shot down nine Camels, seven SE5as and two Dolphins. Conversely, he shot down only six bombers among his 31 score; all modern well-armed craft.

== Post war ==
Billik went into civil aviation after the war. He died in a landing accident in Staaken, Berlin, while piloting one of the world's first passenger aircraft, the Junkers F.13.

== Decorations and awards ==
- Prussian military pilot badge
- Iron Cross, 1st and 2nd class
- Knight's Cross of the Royal House Order of Hohenzollern, with Swords
