= Juhnke =

Juhnke is a German surname. Notable people with the surname include:

- Al Juhnke (born 1958), American politician and a member of the Minnesota House of Representatives
- Harald Juhnke (1929–2005), German actor
- Hermann Juhnke (1893–1914), German World War I flying ace credited with five aerial victories
- Kent Juhnke (born 1955), South Dakota politician
