= John Shaw (RAF officer) =

British fighter pilot of WWII

- Born: 23 April 1916; Worksop, Nottinghamshire, United Kingdom
- Died: 1976 (aged 59–60); Worplesdon, Surrey, United Kingdom
- Military career
- Allegiance: United Kingdom
- Branch: Royal Air Force
- Rank: Group Captain
- Commands: Night Intruder Flight; No. 32 Squadron; No. 122 Squadron
- Conflicts: Second World War: The Blitz; Tunisian campaign; Normandy campaign
- Awards: Distinguished Service Order; Distinguished Flying Cross; Air Force Cross; Order of Leopold with Palme (Belgium); Croix de Guerre with Palme (Belgium)

John Shaw DSO, DFC, AFC (23 April 1916 – 1976) was a British flying ace who served with the Royal Air Force (RAF) during the Second World War and the postwar period. He was credited with having shot down at least seven aircraft.

From Worksop, Shaw was working for a surveying company when he was called up for service in the RAF on the outbreak of the Second World War. Posted to No. 3 Squadron, he flew Hawker Hurricane aircraft in a night fighter role during 1941 and succeeded in shooting down some German aircraft. Awarded the Distinguished Flying Cross in early 1942, he was appointed commander of No. 32 Squadron later that year and led it to North Africa where it flew in support of the Allied advance in North Africa. He achieved further aerial victories during this time and was awarded the Distinguished Service Order when he relinquished command of the squadron. He briefly commanded No. 122 Squadron during the Normandy campaign of 1944 but the majority of his remaining war service was spent in instructing duties. He remained in the RAF in the postwar period, and was awarded the Air Force Cross in 1954. He retired from the RAF ten years later as a group captain and died in 1976.

== Early life ==
John Thornhill Shaw was born on 23 April 1916 in Worksop, Nottinghamshire, in the United Kingdom. He was educated in Australia, at Nailsworth College in Adelaide. Returning to the United Kingdom, he was employed by a surveying company in Derbyshire. In May 1939, he joined the Royal Air Force Volunteer Reserve and commenced training as a pilot.

== Second World War ==
Called up for service in the Royal Air Force (RAF) on the outbreak of the Second World War, Shaw was posted to No. 3 Squadron as a sergeant pilot in November 1940. Equipped with the Hawker Hurricane fighter, this was based at Wick and tasked with the aerial defence of the Royal Navy base at Scapa Flow. A detachment, which included Shaw, was based at Sumburgh in Shetland.

=== The Blitz ===
In April 1941, the squadron moved to Martlesham Heath from where it carried out patrols, mostly at night, with new Hurricane Mk IIs over London. Shaw achieved his first aerial victory on 24 April, sharing in the destruction of a Junkers Ju 88 medium bomber to the west of Ostend. He probably destroyed a Heinkel He 111 medium bomber to the north of London on the night of 10 May. By July the squadron was also carrying out night intruder sorties to France and on one of these, on 7 July, Shaw probably shot down a Dornier Do 17 off Dunkirk. He destroyed a Messerschmitt Bf 109 fighter to the north of Gravelines on 10 August. He was commissioned as a pilot officer in October, but was swiftly advanced in rank to acting flight lieutenant by the end of the year, commanding the squadron's Night Intruder Flight, which was based at Manston.

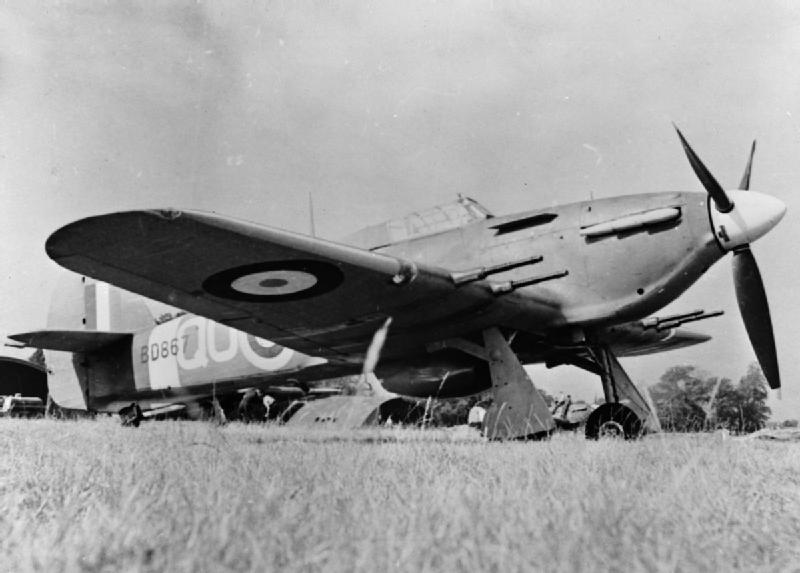
A Hawker Hurricane fighter of No. 3 Squadron, configured with shields above the engine exhausts for night fighting duties

On the night of 8 February 1942, Shaw destroyed a Do 17 to the west of Ostend. During an intruding mission to the Netherlands on the night of 26 March, he shot down a Dornier Do 217 medium bomber over Gilze-Rijen airfield. The next day, his successes were recognised with an award of the Distinguished Flying Cross. The citation, published in the London Gazette, read:

This officer has been engaged on operational flying since November 1940. He has taken part in operations against enemy aircraft by night, in numerous daylight sorties over enemy occupied territory and in many attacks on shipping. Flight Lieutenant Shaw has led his detachment with exceptional skill and keenness and he has destroyed at least 3 enemy aircraft.

— London Gazette, No. 35502, 27 March 1942

Although he was unable to identify the type, Shaw damaged a German aircraft near Schipol airfield on the night of 11 April. On another nighttime intruding mission, carried out on 30 May, he destroyed a Ju 88 to the west of the airfield at Chièvres. He was rested at the end of the month, with a staff posting at the headquarters of Fighter Command. Promoted to acting squadron leader two months later, he was appointed commander of No. 32 Squadron in September.

=== Service in North Africa ===
When Shaw took command, No. 32 Squadron was based at Honiley but non-operational as it was preparing for a move to North Africa. In the aftermath of Operation Torch, it deployed to Phillipeville in December and with its Hurricanes began carrying out patrols over Allied shipping. It subsequently moved to Maison Blanche. In April 1943 Shaw led a flight of the squadron to Souk-El-Khemis from where it would operate on night intruder sorties in support of the Allied advance into Tunisia. On the nights of 15 April and 17 April respectively, Shaw destroyed a Ju 88 over Sidi Ahmed airfield. On the latter occasion, he also damaged a Ju 88. Relinquishing command of the squadron in August, he was awarded the Distinguished Service Order the same month.

=== Later war service ===
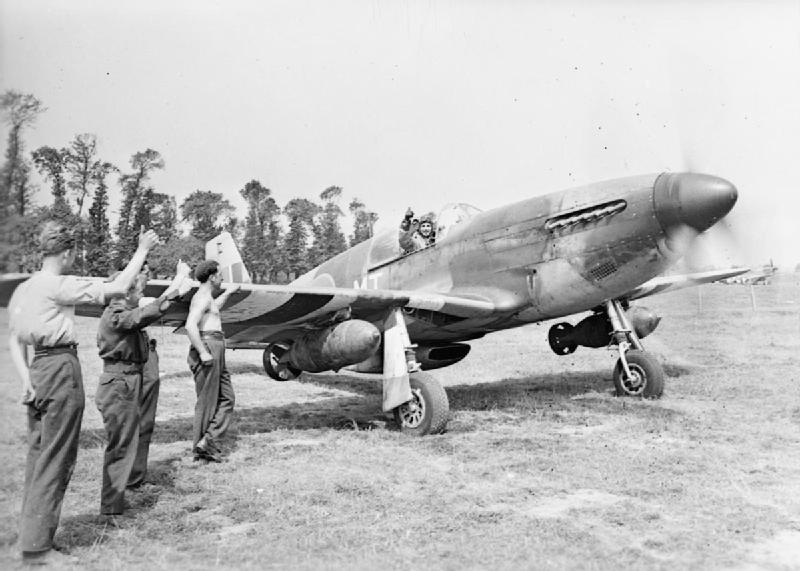
A North American Mustang of No. 122 Squadron on an airfield in Normandy, 1944

Returning to the United Kingdom, in October Shaw was sent to No. 61 Operational Training Unit (OTU) for instructing duties. In February 1944 he went to the United States for a course at the Command and General Staff College. By the start of June he was back in the United Kingdom, attached to No. 19 Squadron which operated the North American Mustang fighter. Later that month, he was given command of No. 122 Squadron. This also operated Mustangs in a ground support role for the Allied forces in the Normandy beachhead and on bomber escort duties from Martragny in France. His leadership of the squadron lasted for two months before he was posted away to the headquarters of Air Defence of Great Britain. By early 1945 Shaw was the Chief Flying Instructor at No. 57 OTU. In February he was promoted wing commander and appointed commander of the training wing at No. 55 OTU.

Shaw ended the war credited with the destruction of seven aircraft, one of which was shared with other pilots, and two damaged. He is also believed to have probably destroyed two aircraft.

== Postwar period ==
Shaw was granted a permanent commission in the RAF as a squadron leader in September 1945. His war services were recognised by the Belgian government, which made Shaw a Chevalier in the Order of Leopold with Palme and also awarded him the Croix de Guerre with Palme. Shaw subsequently served with the 2nd Tactical Air Force at Wunstorf Air Base in Germany. During his service there, he was promoted to wing commander in July 1952 and was awarded the Air Force Cross in the 1954 New Year Honours.

== Later life ==
Promoted to group captain in January 1959, Shaw retired from the RAF in April 1964. He died at Worplesdon, in Surrey, in 1976. His medals came up for auction in February 2025, and were sold for £10,000.
