= Hubert Jones =

British flying ace, Royal Air Force Group Captain (1890–1943)

Hubert Wilson Godfrey Jones Penderel
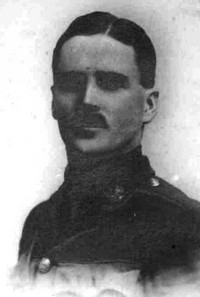
- H. W. Godfrey Jones
- Born: Hubert Wilson Godfrey Jones; 7 October 1890; Llandeilo, Carmarthenshire, Wales
- Died: 14 May 1943 (aged 52); Orford Ness, Suffolk, England
- Burial place: Llangiwg Church, Pontardawe, Glamorganshire, Wales; 51°44′04″N 3°50′58″W
- Military career
- Allegiance: United Kingdom
- Branch: British Army; Royal Air Force
- Service years: 1913–1943
- Rank: Group Captain
- Nickname: Godfrey
- Units: Welsh Regiment; No. 32 Squadron RFC; No. 24 Squadron RFC; No. 28 Squadron RAF; No. 41 Squadron RAF
- Commands: No. 19 Squadron RAF; No. 216 Squadron RAF; No. 201 Group RAF
- Conflicts: World War I • Western Front; World War II
- Awards: Military Cross; Air Force Cross

Group Captain Hubert Wilson Godfrey Jones Penderel MC, AFC, FRGS (7 October 1890 – 14 May 1943) was a British World War I flying ace credited with seven aerial victories. Between the wars he had a distinguished career as a Royal Air Force officer, air racer and explorer, and served as group commander in the early stages of World War II, before being killed while making a test flight of a Hurricane.

== Family background ==
He was born Hubert Wilson Godfrey Jones in Llandeilo, the son of Thomas and Elizabeth Jones, and known to his family as Godfrey. His brother, Captain Elton Augustus Harold Penderel of the Tank Corps and Royal Fusiliers resided at Garth, Rhyd-y-fro, Pontardawe.

== World War I ==
Jones was commissioned as a second lieutenant in the 4th Battalion, The Welsh Regiment, on 17 April 1913. He was promoted to lieutenant on 28 January 1915, and to captain on 11 August 1915.

In July 1916 Jones gained his Aviator's Certificate at the Beatty School of Flying, Hendon, and was appointed a flying officer in the Royal Flying Corps on 22 July. Posted to No. 32 Squadron RFC, flying the Airco DH.2 single-seat fighter, Jones gained his first aerial victory on 11 August, driving down "out of control" a Fokker Eindecker over Rancourt. On 23 September he destroyed an LVG Type C reconnaissance aircraft over Eaucourt l'Abbaye, and on 1 October drove down another Type C over Bihucourt, and then was shot down unhurt. On 16 November he shared in the driving down of two Type C's over Loupart Wood with Lieutenants Maxmillian Mare-Montembault and P. B. G. Hunt, bringing his total to five. His final two victories came on 5 and 15 February 1917, in both cases driving down an Albatros D.I over Grévillers, being wounded in action during the latter. In between, on 10 February, he had been appointed a flight commander with the temporary rank of captain. On 21 March he was shot down near Roupy whilst flying a Nieuport 17 with No. 40 Squadron and was wounded.

For the action of 15 February he was awarded the Military Cross which was gazetted on 26 March 1917. His citation read:

Lieutenant (Temporary Captain) Hubert William Godfrey Jones, Welsh Regiment and Royal Flying Corps.

"For conspicuous gallantry in action. With a patrol of three scouts he attacked a hostile formation of ten enemy machines. Although wounded, he continued the combat and drove down an enemy machine. Later, although again wounded, he remained with his patrol until the enemy retired."

On 26 May he was awarded the Italian Silver Medal for Military Valour.

On 2 August 1917 Jones was appointed an instructor at the Central Flying School, and on 1 July 1918 he was appointed a temporary major. He served as the commander of No. 19 Squadron RAF from November 1918 until December 1919. On 22 January 1919 the Air Ministry officially recorded that he was "Mentioned" in respect of his "valuable services ... rendered in connection with the war". Dixon Noonan Webb has reported that it auctioned his medals on 5 July 2011 (although he informed his family that he had lost his medals in a taxi) and provided a more detailed history of his First World War gallantry. Godfrey's niece, Jenny Morris, has presented to the People's Collection Wales, a photograph of Godfrey with his First World War Medals.

== Inter-war career ==
Jones was granted a permanent commission in the RAF with the rank of captain on 1 August 1919.

On 17 September 1921 he was posted to serve in No. 28 Squadron in India. He then returned to England, and was posted as a supernumerary officer to the RAF Depot (Inland Area) on 19 October 1922.

On 4 April 1923 Jones was posted to No. 41 Squadron, based at RAF Northolt. On 30 June 1923 the 4th Royal Air Force Display at Hendon was held before King George V, the Queen, and the Duke and Duchess of York. Jones was one of the three member RAF Northolt team which came second in the relay race.

On 12 August 1924 in the Third King's Cup Round Britain Race, Jones piloted a Siddeley Siskin III with a 395 hp Siddeley "Jaguar" engine, entered by Sir Glynn Hamilton West. The course was about 950 miles (1,530 km) starting from Martlesham Heath and finishing at Lee-on-Solent. Jones was placed 4th out of 9 competitors. He was photographed alighting from his machine at Gosport, and later crossing the finishing line in the time of 7 hours 34 minutes 12 seconds under the caption, "The fastest machine in the King's Cup Race."

On 1 July 1925 Jones was promoted from flight lieutenant to squadron leader.

On 3–4 July 1925 in the Fourth King's Cup Circuit of Britain Race, Jones piloted an Armstrong-Whitworth Siskin Mk.IV, entered by Sir Glynn Hamilton West. The 1,608-mile (2,588 km) handicap race started and finished in Croydon and comprised two circuits of Britain. Jones finished 2nd out of 14 competitors, and was photographed "receiving congratulations" under the caption, "He started in the race as a Flight-Lieutenant, and finished up as a Squadron-Leader!"

On 4 July 1926 the 7th Royal Air Force Display at Hendon was held before the King and Queen of the United Kingdom, King Alfonso and the Queen of Spain, the Duke of York and the Secretary of State for Air Sir Samuel Hoare. The "event of the day" was "an exhibition of Group evolutions of two wings of three Fighter Squadrons of nine machines—54 in all." Jones led No. 19 (Fighter) Squadron from Duxford flying Gloster Grebes. Flight said, "It was, without doubt, one of the most wonderful displays of skilful piloting that has yet been presented at any of the Displays". He also led No. 19 Squadron in a low-bombing competition involving an attack on a moving tank in which "several direct hits were scored".

On 9–10 July 1926 in the Fifth King's Cup Air Race, Jones piloted a Martinsyde A.D.C.1 with a 395 hp Siddeley "Jaguar" engine, entered by Lt. Col. M. O. Darby. The handicap race of 1,464 miles (2,356 km) started and finished at Hendon. Jones won two prizes: 3rd out of 14 competitors; and the "fastest" time of 9 hours 45 minutes 14 seconds at an average speed of 151.9 mph (244.5 km/h).

On 30 June 1928 the 9th Royal Air Force Display at Hendon was held before King George V and the Queen, the King of Spain and the Duke of York and an estimated crowd of 150,000. Jones led No. 19 Squadron in a dive bombing display.

Jones led No. 19 Squadron's Siskins in the Air Manoeuvres of August 1928. No. 19 was one of 12 fighter squadrons forming part of the defence force in the manoeuvres, "to test the efficiency of units and to teach lessons in co-ordination of air and ground defence, flying organization, spotting arrangements, fighting tactics etc."

On 18 October 1928 Jones assumed the surname of Penderel, and two days later, on 20 October, was posted to No. 216 Squadron in the Middle East.

On 30 March 1929 at All Saints' Cathedral, Cairo, he married Aetheldreda Mary, daughter of Mr. and Mrs. Luxton Loney, of Ocean Avenue, Edgecliff. In 1931 he petitioned the High Court for nullity of marriage.

Between 12 January and 7 February 1931, Penderel commanded a formation of three No. 216 Squadron Vickers Victoria troop carriers on a 6,000-mile (9,700 km) flight from their base at RAF Heliopolis, Cairo, to Cape Town, South Africa, where he was welcomed by the Governor-General the Earl of Clarendon and Lady Clarendon. Despite continual drenching rain between Nairobi and Pretoria, and one or two forced landings, the flight was deemed a success, and the aircraft began the return flight on 11 February.

On 3 June 1931 Penderel was awarded the Air Force Cross which, on 25 June 1931, was conferred on him by King George V at Buckingham Palace.

On 15 July 1931 in the Hanworth–Blackpool Air Race, Penderel piloted a Spartan Arrow, entered by Colonel Louis Strange, finishing 1st out of 14 competitors.

In early 1932 Penderel joined an expedition led by Count László Almásy to locate the legendary "lost oasis" of Zerzura in the plateau of Gilf Kebir, which lies in the southwest corner of Egypt, and southeast Libya. Reconnaissance flights over the area located a two large wadis green with vegetation, but before they could find a way to reach them overland the expedition ran out of supplies and had to return to Cairo. In March 1933 Almásy mounted another expedition in which Penderel took part, by which time Patrick Clayton of the Desert Survey had discovered the entrance to Wadi Abd el Malik, and explored the Kufra Oasis. They mapped the southern and eastern sides of the Gilf Kebir and on western side discovered Wadi Talh. They then visited Jebel Uweinat, south of the Gilf Kebir, where Almásy discovered prehistoric rock paintings. On 8 January 1934, Penderel gave a lecture on his expeditions to the Royal Geographical Society, who admitted him as a Fellow.

Penderel flew air missions to re-supply the 1932 Sahara automobile exploration of Ralph Alger Bagnold.

On 1 January 1933 Penderel was promoted to wing commander, and on 5 October was posted to the Headquarters of the Fighting Area at RAF Uxbridge for personnel staff duties.

On 30 June 1934, at the Fifteenth Royal Air Force Display at Hendon, Penderel represented the RAF Fighting Area HQ as one of ten competitors in the 14-mile (23 km) "Headquarters Race". He piloted a Hawker Fury, fitted with a Kestrel IIS engine. Flight describes the scene, "The scratch man, Wing Commander Penderel, Fighting Area, had already overtaken several others when he came round over the enclosures on the first lap, and from then on he could be seen overhauling other machines steadily." Due to the efficacy of the handicapping, Penderel finished outside the first three places.

On 1 December 1937 Penderel was appointed to command the School of Naval Co-operation based at Ford, West Sussex.

On 1 January 1938 he was promoted to group captain.

== World War II service ==
From 26 September 1939 until 11 May 1940 Penderel served as the first commander of No. 201 Group RAF, which was formed from the General Reconnaissance Group, RAF Middle East.

On 14 May 1943 Penderel flew Hawker Hurricane Mk IIB HV895 on a test flight from RAF Middle Wallop to RAF Martlesham Heath. He took off again from Martlesham, heading for the nearby bombing range at Orford Ness, but the bomb his aircraft was carrying exploded prematurely and he crashed into Sudbourne Marshes and was killed instantly. He is buried at Llangiwg Churchyard, near Pontardawe, Glamorganshire, Wales.
