= Richard Burnard Munday =

- Born: 31 January 1896; Plymouth, England
- Died: 11 July 1932 (aged 36)
- Military career
- Allegiance: United Kingdom
- Branch: Royal Navy; Royal Air Force
- Service years: 1915–1931
- Rank: Squadron Leader
- Unit: No. 8 Naval Squadron RNAS
- Conflicts: World War I • Western Front
- Awards: Distinguished Service Cross; Air Force Cross; Croix de guerre (Belgium)

Major Richard Burnard Munday was an English flying ace credited with scoring nine aerial victories during World War I. He was notable for scoring Britain's first night victory; he also excelled as a balloon buster at the rare feat of shooting down enemy observation balloons at night.

== Early life ==
Richard Burnard Munday was born in Plymouth, England on 31 January 1896. He was the eldest son of Major General and Mrs. R. C. Munday of Port Royal, Plymouth.

== World War I ==
Details of Munday's entry into military service are unknown. However, on 16 February 1915 he lost his probationary status as his rank of flight sub-lieutenant in the Royal Naval Air Service was confirmed, and on the same day he was awarded Royal Aero Club Aviator's Certificate No. 1085. He had trained in a Maurice Farman biplane at the military flight school at Brooklands.

Having completed his pilot's training, he began his aviation duties. He was slightly wounded on 28 December 1915, though details are unknown.

Munday served as an instructor at Cranwell during 1916; one of his pupils was Leonard Henry Rochford. Munday was promoted to flight lieutenant on 1 April 1916.

He was appointed an acting-flight commander on 3 December 1916. On 26 April 1917, Flight magazine reported that Munday had been accidentally injured in the line of duty.

His first aerial success came on 18 August 1917. His second through sixth victories were over observation balloons; most unusually, Munday downed enemy balloons at night, scoring Britain's first night victory in the process. By 21 February 1918, his victory tally had reached nine. His valour earned Munday the Distinguished Service Cross, gazetted on 16 March 1918:

"For courage and initiative. Offensive patrols under his able and determined leadership have consistently engaged enemy aircraft, and he has displayed the utmost courage in carrying out special missions alone, both by day and by night. On the 21st February, 1918, he attacked a new type enemy two-seater machine. The enemy machine dived steeply east, and Flt. Cdr. Munday followed and closed in, firing a long burst at close range, after which the enemy went down vertically out of control. On other occasions he has brought down enemy machines completely out of control, and has set fire to and destroyed enemy kite balloons both by day and night. On one occasion he attacked an enemy kite balloon at night, and destroyed both the balloon and its shed by fire."

On 20 September 1918, he was also awarded the Belgian Croix de guerre.

== List of aerial victories ==
Combat record
No.	Date/time	Aircraft	Foe	Result	Location	Notes
1	18 August 1917; 1830 hours	Sopwith Triplane serial number N5421	Albatros D.V	Driven down out of control	Henin-Liétard	Victory shared with Charles Dawson Booker and Edward Crundall
2	2 September 1917; 2000 hours	Sopwith Camel s/n B3921	Observation balloon	Destroyed	Quiéry-la-Motte	
3	29 September 1917; 2200 hours	Sopwith Camel s/n B3921	Observation balloon	Destroyed	Brebières	First British night victory
4	3 October 1917 approx. 2300 hours	Sopwith Camel	Observation balloon	Destroyed	Douai	
5	7 November 1917; 0610 hours	Sopwith Camel s/n B3921	Observation balloon	Destroyed	North of Meurchin	
6	21 January 1918; 1900 hours	Sopwith Camel s/n B6378	Observation balloon	Destroyed	Godault Farm	
7	29 January 1918; 1510 hours	Sopwith Camel s/n B6378	Albatros D.V	Driven down out of control	Beaumont-Auby	
8	3 February 1918; 1230 hours	Sopwith Camel s/n B6378	Albatros D.V	Driven down out of control	Vitry	
9	21 February 1918; 1130 hours	Sopwith Camel s/n B7197	Reconnaissance aircraft	Driven down out of control	Drocourt	

== Post World War I ==
Munday remained in service postwar. On 1 August 1919, in the Royal Air Force revamping, Munday was granted a permanent commission in the rank of major.

Munday was reassigned from occupation duty with the British Army of the Rhine in Germany when posted to the RAF Depot, Inland Region, back in England, on 16 January 1922. He was then assigned to the Headquarters of the Coastal Area on 1 February.

On 11 December 1922 Munday was posted to the Seaplane Training School (Coastal Area) as a supernumerary officer, then on 29 April 1923 he was posted to RAF Gosport to join No. 422 Flight.

On 27 May 1925, Secretary of State for Air Samuel Hoare recommended the award of the Air Force Cross to Munday; the recommendation read:

"This officer has set a splendid example of sea flying in a ship-plane from a carrier while engaged in continuous reconnaissances under service conditions with the Fleet at sea. These exercises were carried out under conditions that were entirely novel to both pilots and observers and demanded great skill and endurance. Flight Lieutenant Munday's example has been a great incentive to all pilots and observers, and has stimulated Naval flying."

On 3 June 1925, Munday was awarded the Air Force Cross as a sixtieth birthday honour from King George V.

On 1 January 1927, he was promoted from flight lieutenant to squadron leader.

Richard Burnard Munday married Marie Jose de Reul of Brussels in her native city on 26 April 1930.

On 8 May 1930 he was again posted to Headquarters, Coastal Area.

On 5 May 1932, Squadron Leader Munday retired from the Royal Air Force due to ill health. He died on 11 July 1932.
