= John Lightfoot Trollope =

British flying ace

- Born: 30 May 1897; Wallington, Surrey, England
- Died: 21 October 1958 (aged 61); Hove, Sussex, England
- Military career
- Allegiance: United Kingdom
- Branch: British Army; Royal Air Force
- Service years: 1915–1920
- Rank: Captain
- Units: Royal Engineers; No. 70 Squadron RFC; No. 43 Squadron RFC
- Conflicts: First World War: Western Front
- Awards: Military Cross & Bar

John Lightfoot Trollope, MC & Bar (30 May 1897 – 21 October 1958) was a British First World War flying ace, credited with 18 aerial victories, including seven in one day, the first British pilot to do so.

== Early life and background ==
Trollope was born in Wallington, Surrey, the seventh of nine children, and the second surviving son of Howard Woollright Trollope and his wife Caroline Lydia (née Hodgson). The Trollopes moved to Greenhayes, Banstead, when John was young and he was educated at Banstead Hall, a prep school close to the family's new home. He was attending Malvern College when the First World War broke out.

== First World War ==
Trollope enlisted in early 1915, before his 18th birthday, to serve as a despatch rider in the Royal Engineers Signal Service. He served in France from June, but was invalided back to England in September. He was serving as a corporal in the Royal Engineers when, on 17 June 1916, he was commissioned as a temporary second lieutenant on the General List to serve in the Royal Flying Corps. He trained as a pilot, being granted Royal Aero Club Aviators' Certificate No. 3772 after soloing a Maurice Farman biplane at Shoreham on 1 August, and was appointed a flying officer on 2 September.

Trollope served in France from September 1916, flying a Sopwith 1½ Strutter reconnaissance aircraft in No. 70 Squadron. He returned to England in March 1917 to serve as a flying instructor and in a Home Defence squadron. He was promoted to lieutenant on 1 July, and was appointed a flight commander with the temporary rank of captain on 28 July, to serve in No. 43 Squadron in France. Soon after his arrival No. 43 Squadron replaced its 1½ Strutters with Sopwith Camels, and was converted from a reconnaissance to a ground attack unit.

Trollope gained his first aerial victory on 19 January 1918, destroying a DFW two-seater over Vitry. Two further victories followed on 16 and 17 February, and two more on 5 and 11 March to bring his total to five, making him an ace. He accounted for two Albatros D.V fighters on 17 March, and forced a DFW two-seater down to be captured at Mercatel on 23 March.

=== Seven in a day ===
Around 11 a.m. on 24 March Trollope's flight observed four German fighters attacking British reconnaissance aircraft. Trollope promptly attacked, firing at one aircraft from close range, causing it to break up in mid-air. Spotting two more enemy aircraft below he dived and shot them both down before rejoining his flight to engage another group of enemy aircraft, until his ammunition was exhausted. Later the same day, around 3.20 p.m, Trollope's flight encountered three enemy aircraft over the battle line. He attacked one, but his gun jammed and he was forced to withdraw and clear it. He then attacked another at point-blank range, sending it down spinning until it broke up. He then pursued a third aircraft, setting it on fire. On the return home he saw an enemy fighter and a British aircraft dogfighting. Trollope attacked, shooting the enemy down in a spin, and the other pilot saw it crash. (Note: Contemporary accounts (including Trollope himself) and his Military Cross citation credit with Trollope with six aircraft, though in fact he shot down seven.)

=== Capture and return ===
Four days later, on the morning of 28 March, Trollope led a patrol of nine aircraft across the German lines. East of Albert he attacked and destroyed an observation balloon, but was attacked by a formation of German Albatros D.V fighters. In the ensuing dogfight, Trollope shot down two of the enemy, but five British aircraft were shot down, including Trollope, who fell victim to Leutnant Paul Billik, commander of Jasta 52. Trollope was captured, having his left hand and wrist amputated as a result of his injuries. He was soon repatriated, but due to complications his left arm was eventually amputated at the shoulder.

== Awards and citations ==
While in captivity Trollope was awarded the Military Cross and a Bar to the award. The first was gazetted on 13 May 1918, his citation reading:

Temporary Captain John Lightfoot Trollope, General List and Royal Flying Corps.
For conspicuous gallantry and devotion to duty. During a period of three months he has engaged and brought down completely out of control four hostile machines, and has sent down crashing to earth, three others. On all occasions he has displayed the greatest courage, determination and skill, and it is largely due to his fine leadership that the flight under his command has contributed so much to the marked success of the squadron.

The Bar was gazetted on 22 June 1918, reading:

Temporary Captain John Lightfoot Trollope, MC, General List and Royal Flying Corps.
For conspicuous gallantry and devotion to duty. On one occasion during the recent operations, while on offensive patrol, he encountered three enemy machines, two of which he completely destroyed. He then attacked a scout, and after firing 100 rounds into it, the enemy machine went down completely out of control, eventually crashing. Later in the same day, on his flight encountering four enemy two-seater planes, he sent three of them down crashing to earth. Within a month previous to this he fought two hostile formations, numbering 12 machines in all, single-handed, and did not break off the engagement until he had driven off all of them towards the East. He has accounted for 14 enemy machines, and has rendered exceptionally brilliant service by his gallantry and determination.

== List of aerial victories ==
Combat record
| No. | Date/Time | Aircraft/ Serial No. | Opponent | Result | Location | Notes |
|---|---|---|---|---|---|---|
| 1 | 19 January 1918 @ 1025 | Sopwith Camel (B6210) | DFW two-seater | Destroyed | Vitry | |
| 2 | 16 February 1918 @ 1145 | Sopwith Camel (B6210) | DFW two-seater | Destroyed | Vitry | |
| 3 | 17 February 1918 @ 0930 | Sopwith Camel (B6210) | DFW two-seater | Out of control | Brebières | |
| 4 | 5 March 1918 @ 1520 | Sopwith Camel (B6210) | DFW two-seater | Out of control | East of La Bassée | |
| 5 | 11 March 1918 @ 1350 | Sopwith Camel (B6210) | Albatros D.V | Out of control | Sainghin | |
| 6 | 17 March 1918 @ 1145–1200 | Sopwith Camel (C8270) | Albatros D.V | Out of control | Maugne | |
| 7 | 17 March 1918 @ 1145–1200 | Sopwith Camel (C8270) | Albatros D.V | Destroyed in flames | 4 miles (6.4 km) east of Armentières | |
| 8 | 23 March 1918 @ 1300 | Sopwith Camel (C8270) | DFW two-seater | Captured | Mercatel | |
| 9 | 24 March 1918 @ 1100–1105 | Sopwith Camel (C8270) | DFW two-seater | Destroyed | East of Mercatel | |
| 10 | 24 March 1918 @ 1100–1105 | Sopwith Camel (C8270) | DFW two-seater | Destroyed in flames | South-east of Mercatel | Shared with Second Lieutenant Robert Johnstone Owen. |
| 11 | 24 March 1918 @ 1100–1105 | Sopwith Camel (C8270) | Albatros D.V | Destroyed | East of Mercatel | |
| 12 | 24 March 1918 @ 1520–1530 | Sopwith Camel (C8270) | Albatros two-seater | Destroyed | Sailly-Saillisel | |
| 13 | 24 March 1918 @ 1520–1530 | Sopwith Camel (C8270) | Albatros two-seater | Destroyed | Sailly-Saillisel | |
| 14 | 24 March 1918 @ 1520–1530 | Sopwith Camel (C8270) | Albatros two-seater | Destroyed | Sailly-Saillisel | |
| 15 | 24 March 1918 @ 1520–1530 | Sopwith Camel (C8270) | Two-seater | Destroyed | Sailly-Saillisel | |
| 16 | 28 March 1918 @ 0930 | Sopwith Camel (C8270) | Balloon | Destroyed | East of Albert | |
| 17 | 28 March 1918 @ 0930 | Sopwith Camel (C8270) | Albatros D.V | Destroyed | East of Albert | |
| 18 | 28 March 1918 @ 0930 | Sopwith Camel (C8270) | Albatros D.V | Destroyed | East of Albert | |

== Post-war ==
Trollope relinquished his RAF commission on 10 February 1920, on account of ill-health caused by wounds, and was permitted to retain his rank.

Trollope married Molly Field on 30 January 1926, and had two children. Following their divorce, he married Rosina Victoria Vinter in 1934. Their daughter, Angela, was born in 1938. Trollope died in Hove Hospital in 1958.
