= Hať =

- Municipality
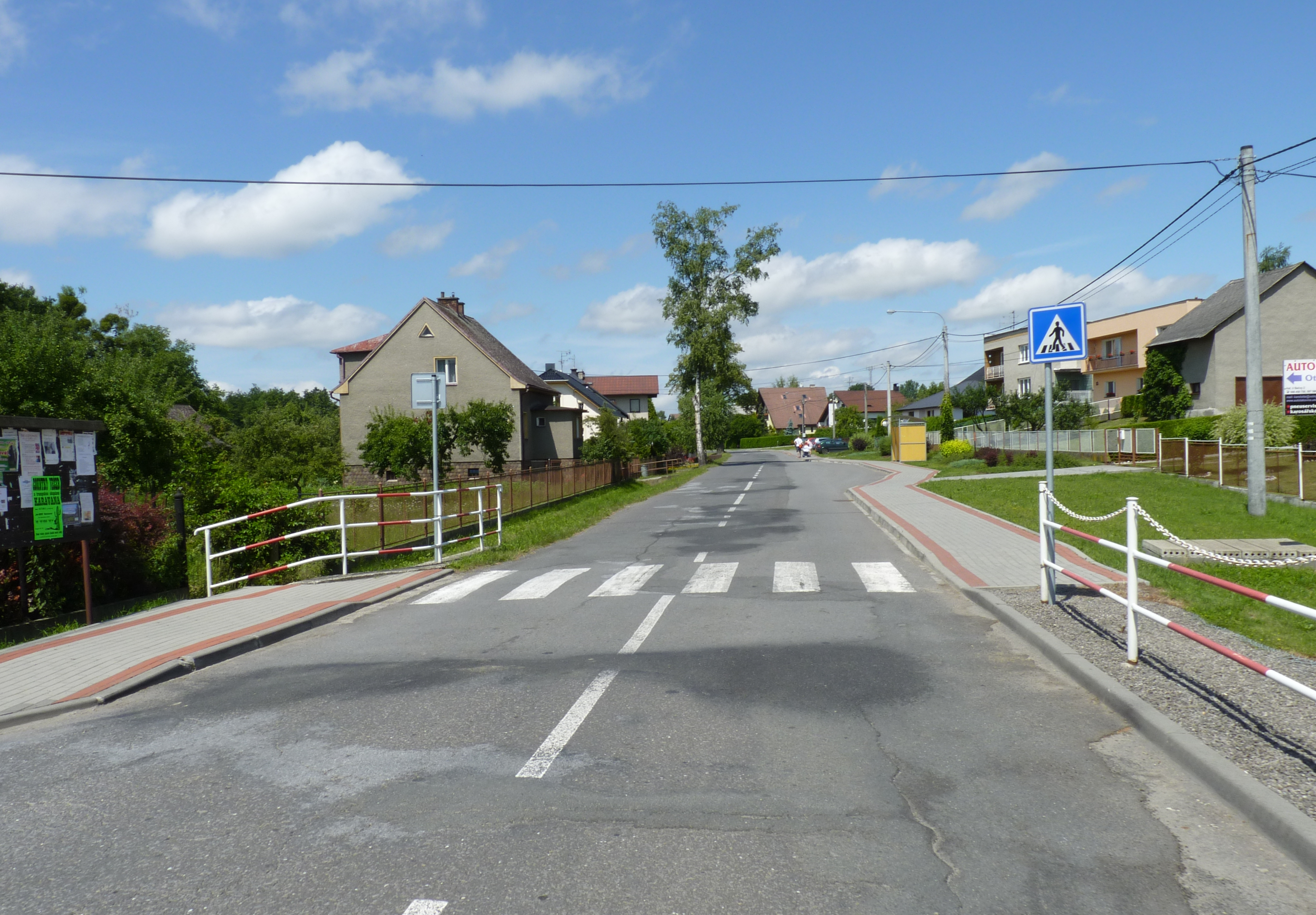
- Main street

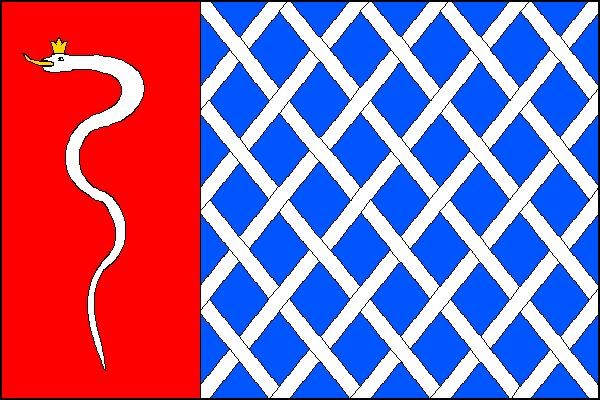
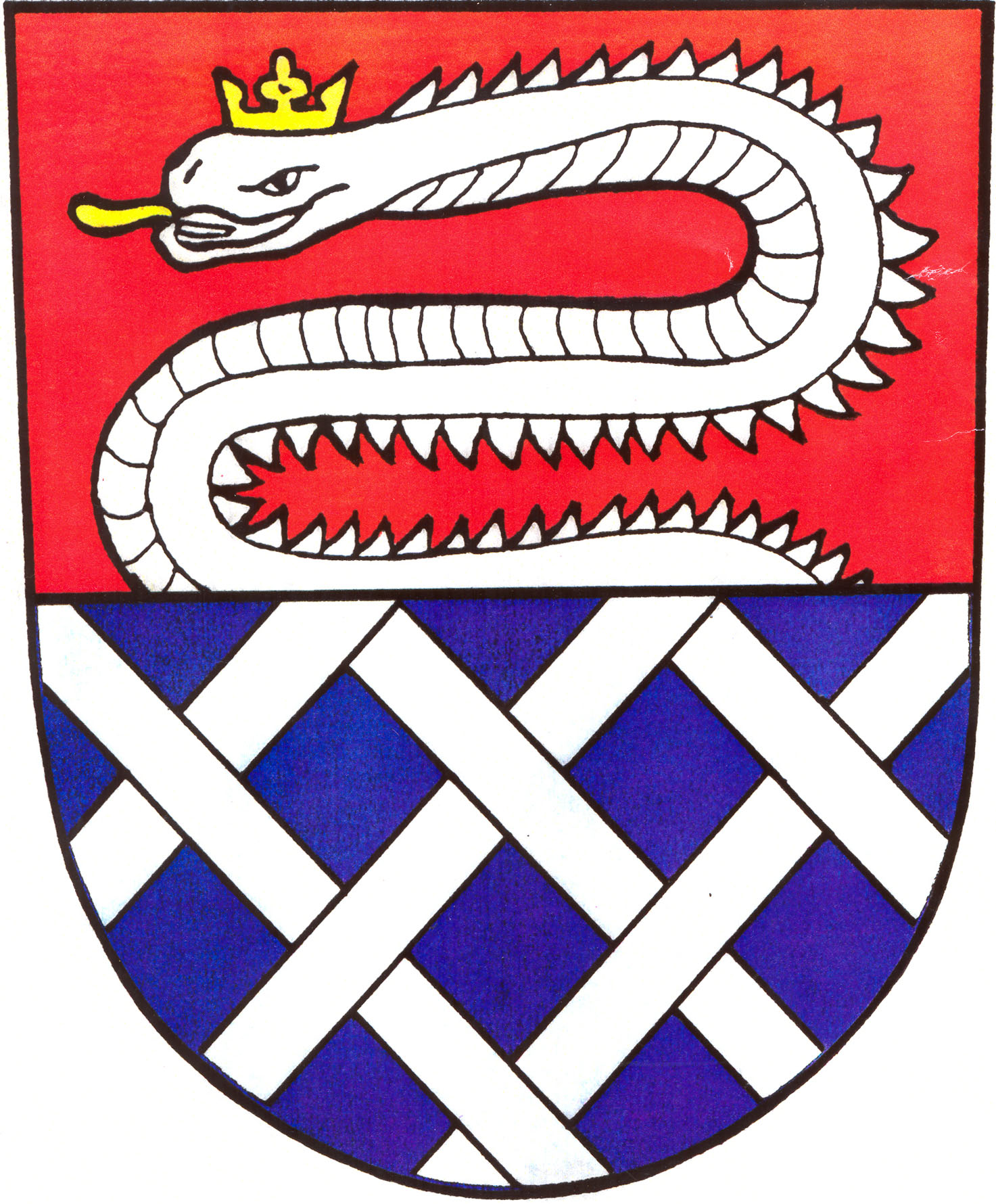
- Flag Coat of arms

- Location in the Czech Republic
- Coordinates: 49°56′47″N 18°14′22″E
- Country: Czech Republic
- Region: Moravian-Silesian
- District: Opava
- First mentioned: 1250

Area
  - Total: 15.75 km^{2} (6.08 sq mi)
- Elevation: 215 m (705 ft)

Population (2025-01-01)
  - Total: 2,566
  - Density: 162.9/km^{2} (422.0/sq mi)
- Time zone: UTC+1 (CET)
  - Summer (DST): UTC+2 (CEST)
- Postal code: 747 16
- Website: www.obechat.cz

Hať (formerly Haš; German: Haatsch) is a municipality and village in Opava District in the Moravian-Silesian Region of the Czech Republic. It has about 2,600 inhabitants. It is part of the historic Hlučín Region.

== Geography ==
Hať is located about 23 kilometres (14 mi) east of Opava and 12 km (7 mi) north of Ostrava, on the border with Poland. It lies mostly in the Opava Hilly Land, only the eastern part of the municipal territory extends into the Ostrava Basin. The highest point is at 279 m (915 ft) above sea level. The Bečva Stream flows through the municipality.

== History ==
The first written mention of Hať is in a deed of Pope Innocent IV from 1250, when the village was owned by the monastery in Velehrad. From 1439, it was owned by various lower noblemen. In 1517–1567, Hať belonged to the Hlučín estate, then it was annexed to the Šilheřovice estate. In 1673, a large fire damaged the village. From 1742 to 1918, after Empress Maria Theresa had been defeated, the village belonged to Prussia. In 1920, it became part of the newly established Czechoslovakia.

In 1978–1990, Hať was a municipal part of Hlučín. Since 1990, it has been again an independent municipality.

== Demographics ==
Historical population

Year	Pop.	±%
1869	1,352	—
1880	1,368	+1.2%
1890	1,538	+12.4%
1900	1,695	+10.2%
1910	1,780	+5.0%

Year	Pop.	±%
1921	1,720	−3.4%
1930	1,960	+14.0%
1950	2,119	+8.1%
1961	2,400	+13.3%
1970	2,398	−0.1%

Year	Pop.	±%
1980	2,515	+4.9%
1991	2,474	−1.6%
2001	2,564	+3.6%
2011	2,516	−1.9%
2021	2,474	−1.7%

Source: Censuses

== Transport ==
There are no railways or major roads passing through the municipality.

== Sights ==
The main landmark of Hať is the Church of Saint Matthew. It was built in the Baroque style in 1731 and rebuilt in 1894.

== Notable people ==
- Paul Billik (1891–1926), German fighter pilot
