= Arthur Claydon =

British flying ace (1885–1918)

- Born: 25 September 1885; Deeping St. James, Lincolnshire, England
- Died: 8 July 1918 (aged 32); Vicinity of Carvin, France
- Burial place: Cabaret Rouge British Cemetery, Pas de Calais, France
- Military career
- Allegiance: Canada; United Kingdom
- Branch: Canadian Expeditionary Force; British Army; Royal Air Force
- Service years: 1916–1918
- Rank: Captain
- Units: Canadian Field Artillery; No. 32 Squadron RAF
- Conflicts: World War I
- Awards: Distinguished Flying Cross

Captain Arthur Claydon DFC (25 September 1885 – 8 July 1918) was a British World War I flying ace credited with seven aerial victories.

== Biography ==
Claydon was one of five brothers, born in Deeping St. James, Lincolnshire. In 1902 he and his older brother Ebenezer emigrated to Canada, and after settling in Winnipeg founded their own general contracting business in 1904.

Having been a member of the militia unit The Winnipeg Grenadiers since 1903, he was commissioned as a lieutenant when he enlisted into the Canadian Expeditionary Force on 18 February 1916, and was assigned to the 38th Battery, 10th Brigade, Canadian Field Artillery. After arriving in England he transferred to the Royal Flying Corps on 30 October 1916, to train as a pilot at Reading.

On 29 April 1917 he was seconded to the RFC with the rank of temporary lieutenant, and was appointed a flying officer the same day. He was posted to No. 32 Squadron on 6 September. On 11 November 1917 he was shot down by German ace Max Ritter von Müller, but survived, gaining his first victory shortly afterwards, on 20 November, flying a DH.5.

On 6 May 1918 he was promoted to acting-captain. Between 8 May and 25 June 1918, he gained six more victories (including one shared) flying the S.E.5a.

Claydon was killed on 8 July 1918, after being shot down by Paul Billik of Jagdstaffel 52 near Carvin. He is buried at the Cabaret Rouge British Cemetery at Souchez.

On 2 August 1918 his award of the Distinguished Flying Cross was gazetted. The citation read:

Lieutenant (Temporary Captain) Arthur Claydon (formerly Canadian Field Artillery).
Recently this officer, single-handed, went to the assistance of another pilot, who was attacked by eleven Fokker biplanes and six scouts. By his gallant conduct and skilful manoeuvring he not only extricated the pilot, but drove down several of the enemy aeroplanes. He has shown great initiative and gallantry in locating, bombing and attacking troops on the ground from low altitudes.
