= Hermann Juhnke =

- Born: 7 April 1893; Laurenburg, Germany
- Died: Unknown
- Military career
- Allegiance: Germany
- Branch: Flying service
- Rank: Vizefeldwebel
- Units: Flieger-Abteilung (Artillerie) (Flier Detachment Artillery) 238; Kampfeinsitzerstaffel (Combat Single-seater Squadron) 5; Jagdstaffel 41 (Fighter Squadron 41); Jagdstaffel 52 (Fighter Squadron 52)
- Awards: Military Merit Cross; Iron Cross

Vizefeldwebel Hermann Juhnke (born 7 April 1893) was a German World War I flying ace credited with five aerial victories.

== Biography ==
Hermann Juhnke was born in Laurenburg in the German Empire on 7 April 1893. He first served his mandatory military duty with Luftschiffer (Aeronautical) Battalion Nr. 1 before World War I began. In July 1915, he transferred to heavier-than-air aviation, entering training at Fliegerersatz-Abteilung (Replacement Detachment) 3 at Gotha, Germany. After training, he was posted to Flieger-Abteilung (Artillerie) (Flier Detachment Artillery) 238 in July 1916; they were an artillery cooperation unit. He did well enough with them to rate the Military Merit Cross, which would subsequently be awarded to him.

He left FA(A) 238 for Jastaschule I (Fighter School 1) on 30 August 1917. After graduation, he was assigned to a fighter squadron, Jagdstaffel 41 late in 1917. He also flew with an ad hoc fighter unit, Kampfeinsitzerstaffel (Combat single-seater squadron) 5. However, Juhnke did not enjoy any success until he joined Jasta 52 on 4 March 1918. His first victory came on 2 May 1918, when he shot down a Sopwith Camel from 43 Squadron over Locon, France. Then, on two separate sorties on 5 June 1918, Juhnke shot down two British fighters, a Royal Aircraft Factory SE.5a and a Bristol F.2 Fighter. At 1405 hours on 27 June, he shot down an Airco DH.4 from 25 Squadron over Nieppe Forest.

On 16 July 1918, he was belatedly awarded his empire's highest decoration for enlisted men, the Military Merit Cross. On 8 August 1918, he shot down another SE.5a for his fifth confirmed victory. He would claim another win in September, but it would go unconfirmed. Hermann Juhnke would survive World War I; besides becoming a flying ace and winning the Military Merit Cross, he had been awarded the Iron Cross First Cross. The latter decoration could not have taken place without a prior of the Second Class Iron Cross. Juhnke had also been wounded four times, which should have qualified him for a Wound Badge. Neither of the latter decorations are noted in records.
