= Albert Desbrisay Carter =

Canadian flying ace

Albert Carter
- Born: 2 June 1892; Point de Bute, New Brunswick, Canada
- Died: 22 May 1919 (aged 26); Shoreham, Sussex
- Burial place: Old Shoreham Cemetery
- Military career
- Allegiance: United Kingdom (Canada)
- Branch: Royal Flying Corps
- Service years: 1917–1919
- Rank: Major
- Nickname: Nick
- Unit: No. 19 Squadron
- Conflicts: World War I
- Awards: Distinguished Service Order & Bar; Croix de Guerre (France)

Albert Desbrisay Carter DSO & Bar (2 June 1892 – 22 May 1919) was a Canadian World War I flying ace credited with 28 victories.

== Early life and career ==
Albert Desbrisay Carter was born in Point de Bute, New Brunswick. Nicknamed "Nick", Carter was student at Mount Allison University, Sackville, N.B. and a pre-war officer in the Canadian militia. Not long after beginning his studies he joined the local infantry company, F Company, 74th Regiment (The New Brunswick Rangers) and was granted a commission as lieutenant in April 1912.

In November 1914 he was seconded from the N.B. Rangers as a volunteer for the 26th (New Brunswick) Battalion C.E.F. His wartime army service is well documented in his personnel file. He went overseas with his unit in Jun 1915 as lieutenant and machine gun officer. The 26th Battalion reached France in September 1915. Carter was wounded in the action of 14 October 1915, taking a piece of shrapnel in the right thigh. After treatment in England he was granted sick furlough home to New Brunswick. Towards the end of his convalescence he received permission to accept a company command in the 140th (New Brunswick) Battalion, then in formation. This meant a promotion from lieutenant directly to major. With his new rank and responsibilities Carter returned to England in September 1916. There being an over-abundance of inexperienced senior officers, Cater was employed for a number of months in the reserve training division, first with the Royal Canadian Regiment depot, and subsequently with the 13th Reserve Battalion of the New Brunswick Regiment, which provided reinforcements to his old unit in France, the 26th.

In May 1917, despite holding the rather senior rank of major, he was attached to the Royal Flying Corps Number 1 School of Military Aeronautics. On 7 July 1917, he was remanded to Number 1 Training Squadron. Later that month he moved on to Number 20 Training Squadron. He was seconded to the Royal Flying Corps in August 1917 and finished his training with Number 56 Training Squadron. He was granted a temporary commission of Flying Officer on 3 September 1917, while retaining his Canadian Army rank of Major during his secondment to the RFC.

== Service as a fighter pilot ==
On 1 October 1917, Carter received an assignment to No. 19 Squadron, where he remained until war's end. On 31 October, he opened his career with an Albatros D.V destroyed and another German plane driven down out of battle. On 13 November 1917 he became an ace on the third of the six victories he would score that month. Also in November, he was promoted to flight commander. By the end of the year, on 29 December, he would score his fifteenth and final triumph flying a SPAD.

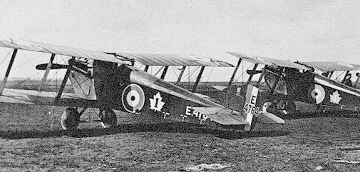
Sopwith Dolphin (Canadian markings)

His next victories would not come for another two and a half months. He had an opportunity when he engaged enemy two-seaters, but was thwarted by a broken gunsight on his new Sopwith Dolphin. Then, on 15 March 1918, he destroyed one Pfalz D.III and sent another one down out of control. He would score an even dozen times flying the Dolphin, with his final success falling in flames on 16 May 1918. His final tally was 14 enemy driven down out of control and 14 destroyed. Seven of his victories were shared with other pilots. Twenty of his 28 victims were enemy fighters.

On 18 March, Major Carter was shot down by German ace Lieutenant (Leutnant) Paul Billik. Carter fell behind German lines, survived the crash, and was captured. He was officially reported Missing in Action on 19 May 1918. He finished his war in a prisoner of war camp at Karlsruhe, Bavaria. He received the Distinguished Service Order, while in prison, on 18 July. It was followed by the unprecedented bestowal of a Bar, equivalent to a second award, on 16 September 1918. He was repatriated on 13 December 1918.

== Post World War I ==
After spending the month of January 1919 in hospital, Carter transferred to the all-Canadian 123 Squadron, RAF, forerunner of the nascent Canadian Air Force. On 22 May 1919, Carter was killed in a flying accident while test flying a Fokker D.VII; the plane broke up under him. He was buried at Old Shoreham Cemetery, Shoreham, Sussex, England.

== Text of citations ==
=== Distinguished Service Order ===
"Maj. Albert Desbrisay Carter, Infy., and R.F.C. For conspicuous gallantry and devotion to duty. He destroyed two enemy aeroplanes, drove down several others out of control, and on two occasions attacked enemy troops from a low altitude. He showed great keenness and dash as a patrol leader."

=== Bar to Distinguished Service Order ===
His citation read:

Major Albert Desbrisay Carter, D.S.O., New Brunswick R., and R.A.F.
For conspicuous gallantry and devotion to duty as a fighting pilot. In three and a half months he destroyed thirteen enemy machines. He showed the utmost determination, keenness and dash, and his various successful encounters, often against odds, make up a splendid record.

Carter also received the Belgian Croix de Guerre (London Gazette 30631) and was Mentioned in Dispatches (London Gazette 30691).
