= Wilfred Green (RAF officer) =

British flying ace (1898–1947)

Wilfrid Barratt Green
- Born: 9 April 1898; Burslem, Staffordshire, England
- Died: 13 September 1947 (aged 49); Burslem, Stoke-on-Trent, Staffordshire, England
- Military career
- Allegiance: United Kingdom
- Branch: British Army; Royal Air Force
- Service years: 1917–1919
- Rank: Captain
- Units: London Regiment (Artists' Rifles); No. 32 Squadron RAF
- Conflicts: World War I; Western Front
- Awards: Distinguished Flying Cross; Legion of Honour (France); Croix de Guerre (France)

Captain Wilfrid Barratt Green (Note: This is the form of his name used in the military service records of the National Archives, but the London Gazette and other sources sometimes use Wilfrid and Barrat.) DFC (9 April 1898 – 13 September 1947 (Note: The Sentinel article gives 13 November as his date of death.)) was an English World War I flying ace credited with seven aerial victories.

== Biography ==
He was the second son of Thomas Seaman and Louisa Green of Burslem. His father was a grocer, baker, and provision dealer, who served as a member of the borough council, as a councillor for the East Ward, in 1906–1908. His older brother Thomas Seaman Green (1895–1917), served as a lieutenant in No. 3 Squadron RFC and was killed in action near Heilly, on 13 February 1917, aged 22.

Green enlisted into the 28th (County of London) Battalion of the London Regiment (Artists' Rifles) as a private (No. 765446) in 1917. (Note: The 760000 series of six digit service numbers were issued from January 1917.) At this time the Artists' Rifles battalions were officer training units, which supplied 10,256 officers to other units over the course of the war.

Green was transferred to the General List to be appointed a second lieutenant (on probation) in the Royal Flying Corps on 12 August 1917. He was confirmed in his rank and appointed a flying officer on 15 October 1917.

Green was assigned to No. 32 Squadron, flying the S.E.5a single-seat fighter. He gained his first aerial victory on 2 April 1918, the day after the Army's Royal Flying Corps (RFC) and the Royal Naval Air Service (RNAS) were merged to form the Royal Air Force, by driving down a Pfalz D.III out of control north-east of Moreuil. Several weeks later, on 16 May he sent another Pfalz D.III down in flames over Fresnes.

On 9 June 1918, by then a lieutenant, he was appointed temporary captain, and served as flight commander of "B" Flight. July 1918 proved the high point of Green's combat career, driving down a Pfalz D.III over Dormans on the 15th, and a Fokker D.VII over Tréloup the next day. On 22 July he drove down another D.VII over Mont-Notre-Dame, and on the 25th another D.VII over Fismes. He gained his seventh and final victory on 23 August, destroying a Fokker D.VII east of Douai. Green finally left No. 32 Squadron on 8 September 1918.

On 29 November 1918 his award of the Distinguished Flying Cross was gazetted, the citation reading:

Lieutenant (Acting Captain) Wilfred Barrat Green

A bold and very gallant officer who has destroyed two enemy aeroplanes and driven down five out of control. He has also shown a fine offensive spirit in engaging ground targets during the recent battles, using his machine guns with great effect.

On the same day he also received permission to wear the Croix de Chevalier of the Légion d'honneur awarded by France. He also received the Croix de Guerre avec Palme from France. His permission to wear it was gazetted on 11 July 1919.

In November 2014 it was announced that a street in the new Smithfield city centre business district of Stoke-on-Trent will be named after him, alongside others named after local men who served in the First World War.
