= Maxmillian Mare-Montembault =

British flying ace

Maximillian John Jules Gabriel Mare-Montembault
- Born: 4 March 1895; Croydon, England
- Died: 1953 (aged 57–58); Paddington, London
- Military career
- Allegiance: United Kingdom
- Branch: British Army; Royal Air Force
- Service years: 1915–1919
- Rank: Lieutenant
- Nickname: Monty
- Units: North Somerset Yeomanry; No. 32 Squadron RFC
- Conflicts: World War I; Western Front
- Awards: Military Cross

Lieutenant Maximillian John Jules Gabriel Mare-Montembault MC (4 March 1895 – 1953) was a British World War I flying ace credited with six aerial victories. Mare-Montembault was born in Croydon, England, to French parents.

== Military service ==
Mare-Montembault was commissioned from private in the Inns of Court Officers' Training Corps to second lieutenant on 25 June 1915, assigned to the North Somerset Yeomanry, Territorial Force. He was later seconded for duty with the Royal Flying Corps (RFC) and appointed a flying officer on 3 August 1916.

Mare-Montembault was posted to No. 32 Squadron RFC on 10 August 1916, flying the Airco DH.2 single-seat fighter. He gained his first aerial victory on 15 September by sending a Roland C reconnaissance aircraft down in flames south of Bapaume. On 10 October he was shot down by Oswald Boelcke, but managed to crash-land unhurt within the British lines. He was soon back in the air, as on 22 October he drove down an Albatros D.I "out of control" over Irles, and on 16 November he shared in the driving down of two Type C reconnaissance aircraft over Loupart Wood with Captain Hubert Jones and Lieutenants P. B. G. Hunt and H. G. Southon. The following day he drove down another solo over Bucquoy. On the afternoon of 6 March 1917 in a dogfight east of Bapaume Mare-Montembault destroyed another Albatros D.I, but was then himself shot down by Adolf von Tutschek, crashed-landing behind the German lines, and was captured.

While a prisoner of war, on 4 June 1917 he was awarded the Military Cross, and on 31 July was promoted to lieutenant in the North Somerset Yeomanry, with precedence from 1 June 1916.

== Later life ==
Mare-Montembault was eventually released following the armistice of 11 November 1918, and was repatriated to England in January 1919, but on 10 April he relinquished his RAF commission "on account of ill-health contracted on active service". He remained a member of the Territorial Force Reserve post-war, being promoted to lieutenant on 15 November 1919. On 16 December 1919 he received a mention in dispatches "for valuable services whilst in captivity".

On 31 January 1925, Maxmillian Mare-Montembault married Elsie May Hollands. At the time he was working as a bank clerk and living in Addiscombe.
