= John Henry Tudhope =

- Born: 17 April 1891; Johannesburg, South African Republic
- Died: 12 October 1956 (aged 65); London, England
- Military career
- Allegiance: Union of South Africa; Canada
- Branch: Royal Flying Corps; Royal Air Force; Royal Canadian Air Force
- Unit: No. 40 Squadron RAF
- Awards: Military Cross & bar
- Other work: operations manager for Trans-Canada Air Lines

John Henry Tudhope MC & bar (17 April 1891 - 12 October 1956) was a South African flying ace credited with 10 victories in World War I. After the war, he emigrated to Canada and joined the RCAF.

Tudhope surveyed routes for the Trans-Canada Air Lines, receiving the McKee Trophy for his work in 1930. In 1937, he flew the first dawn to dusk flight across Canada, from Montreal to Vancouver, British Columbia. He became president of the first Aviation Insurance Group in Canada. He died in London, England, while serving as telecommunications attache at Canada House.
