= Edward Crundall =

British flying ace

Edward Duncan Crundall
- Born: 9 December 1896; Whitfield, Kent, England
- Died: 1980s
- Military career
- Allegiance: United Kingdom
- Branch: Royal Navy; Royal Air Force
- Service years: 1914–1919; 1935–1954
- Rank: Wing Commander
- Units: No. 8 Squadron RNAS; No. 210 Squadron RAF
- Commands: No. 116 (Calibration) Squadron RAF
- Conflicts: World War I World War II
- Awards: Distinguished Flying Cross; Air Force Cross

Wing Commander Edward Duncan Crundall DFC, AFC (9 December 1896 – 1980s) was an officer of the British Royal Air Force, who served in World War I, becoming flying ace credited with seven aerial victories, and also in World War II.

== Biography ==
Edward Duncan Crundall was born in Whitfield, Kent, England on 9 December 1896. He was the son of Edward Crundall (1852-1942), a wealthy coal dealer of Kent, and Sarah Crundall, née Morley. Edward's grandfather, Henry Crundall (1821-1894), was an uncle of Sir William Henry Crundall (1847-1934), a mayor of Dover, Kent, and Chairman of the Dover Harbour Board. Edward Duncan's younger brother, Walter Frederick (1899-1982), also flew during World War 1. Edward Duncan Crundall died in 1981 in Brighton, E. Sussex.

=== World War I ===
Crundall joined the Royal Naval Air Service in 1914. He was appointed a temporary flight sub-lieutenant on 20 July 1916. On 5 September 1916 he was granted the Royal Aero Club Aviator's Certificate No. 3543 at Royal Naval Air Station Eastbourne, and was posted to No. 8 Naval Squadron as a pilot. He would score his first aerial victories during Bloody April 1917 while flying a Sopwith Triplane. On 10 May 1917, he was wounded and shot down by Alois Heldmann.

Crundall was promoted to flight lieutenant on 31 December 1917, and on 10 May 1918 he was appointed acting-captain. He then switched squadrons and mounts for his last four wins in July and August 1918, flying a Sopwith Camel for 210 Squadron RAF. He was confirmed in his rank in December 1918.

Crundall relinquished his commission on 28 August 1919, and on 10 October "in recognition of distinguished services rendered during the war", was awarded the Distinguished Flying Cross.

List of aerial victories
No.	Date/time	Aircraft	Foe	Result	Location	Notes
1	14 April 1917 @ 0905 hours	Sopwith Triplane; Serial Number N5464	Albatros reconnaissance plane	Driven down out of control	Henin-Liétard	
2	14 April 1917 @ 0905 hours	Sopwith Triplane; Serial Number N5464	Albatros reconnaissance plane	Driven down out of control	Henin-Liétard	
3	18 August 1917 @ 1830 hours	Sopwith Triplane; Serial Number N5464	Albatros D.V	Driven down out of control	Henin-Liétard	Victory shared with Richard Burnard Munday & Charles Dawson Booker
4	30 July 1918 @ 1000 hours	Sopwith Camel; Serial Number B7860	Pfalz D.III	Driven down out of control	East of Diksmuide	
5	1 August 1918 @ 1925 hours	Sopwith Camel; Serial Number B7860	Fokker D.VII	Driven down out of control	North of Lille	
6	9 August 1918 @ 0725 hours	Sopwith Camel; Serial Number B7860	Fokker D.VII	Destroyed	Zonnebeke	
7	9 August 1918 @ 0730 hours	Sopwith Camel; Serial Number B7860	Fokker D.VII	Destroyed	Southeast of Staden	

=== Post World War I ===
Crundall continued working in aviation, and on 16 July 1935 was commissioned as a flying officer (class C) in the Reserve of Air Force Officers (RAFO). He flew civil flights and air charter work until 1937.

=== World War II ===
In 1939 Crundall returned to active service, while remaining a Reserve Officer. He was promoted to flight lieutenant on 3 September 1940, to temporary squadron leader on 1 March 1942, and to war substantive squadron leader on 15 August 1942. He commanded No. 116 (Calibration) Squadron until 1945, and on 1 January 1945 was awarded the Air Force Cross for his efforts, by which time he was an acting-wing commander.

=== Post World War II ===
After World War II, Crundall began charter airlines to French Equatorial Africa and South Africa. He remained a member of the Reserve of Air Force Officers, until finally relinquishing his commission on 10 February 1954, retaining the rank of wing commander. By the end of his flying career, he had accumulated over 8,500 flying hours in his pilot's log. His autobiography, entitled Fighter Pilot on the Western Front, was published in 1975. In 1958 he was the publisher of the "EVENTS in BRISTOL" magazine Vol. 10. No. 123 April 1958 price 6d 24 pages. Also published "Events in the West" and "Events in Wales" from an address in Weston-super-Mare, Somerset, England.
