= Cantaing-sur-Escaut =

- Commune
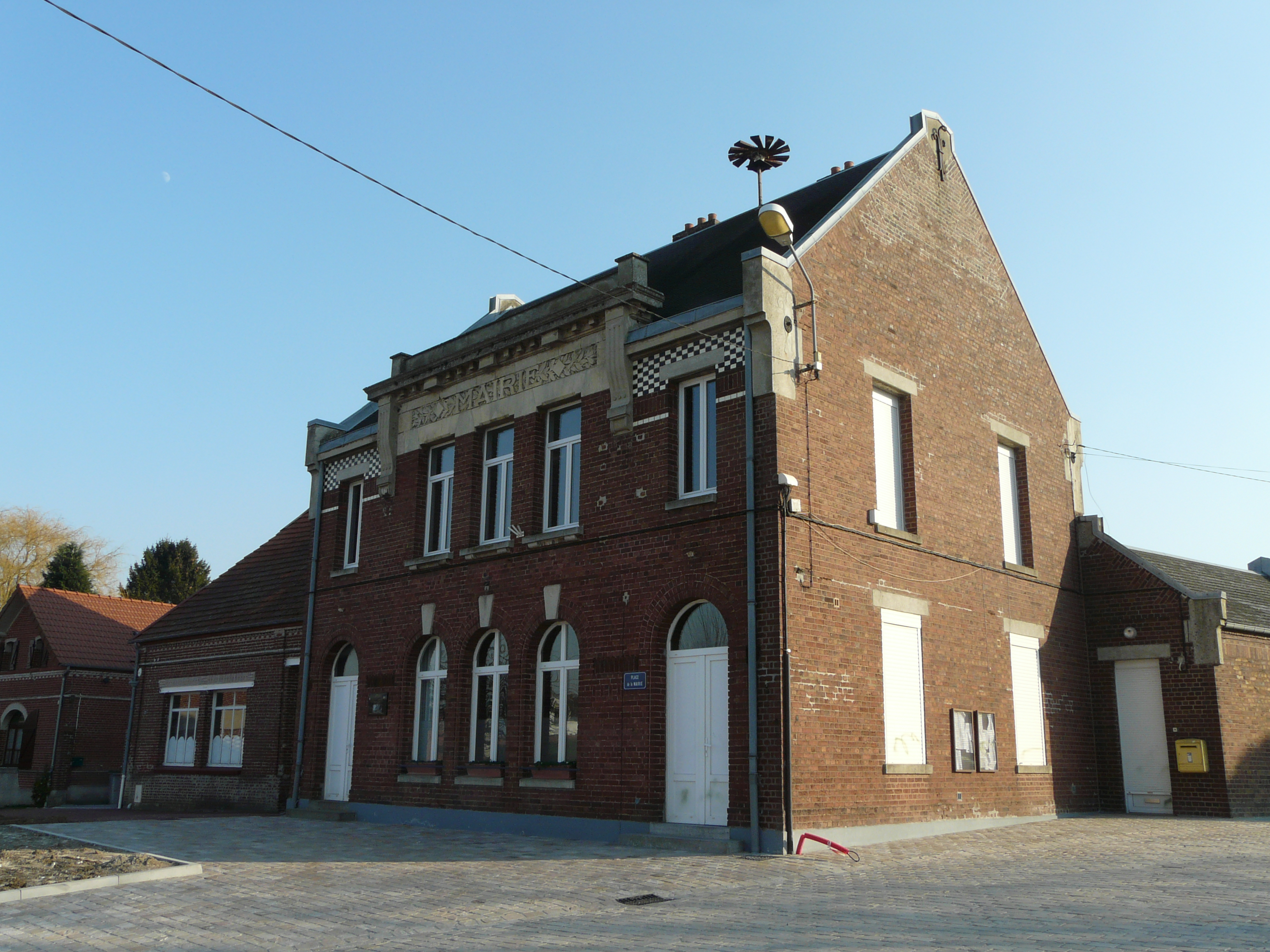
- The town hall in Cantaing-sur-Escaut

- Coat of arms
- Location of Cantaing-sur-Escaut
- Location within France Location within Hauts-de-France
- Coordinates: 50°08′56″N 3°09′50″E
- Country: France
- Region: Hauts-de-France
- Department: Nord
- Arrondissement: Cambrai
- Canton: Le Cateau-Cambrésis
- Intercommunality: CA Cambrai

Government
  - Mayor (2020–2026): Éric Parent
- Area^{1}: 6.48 km^{2} (2.50 sq mi)
- Elevation: 54 m (177 ft)
- Highest elevation: 97 m (318 ft)
- Lowest elevation: 47 m (154 ft)
- Population (2023): 410
  - Density: 63/km^{2} (160/sq mi)
- Time zone: UTC+01:00 (CET)
  - Summer (DST): UTC+02:00 (CEST)
- INSEE/Postal code: 59125 /59267
- ^{1} French Land Register data, which excludes lakes, ponds, glaciers > 1 km^{2} (0.386 sq mi or 247 acres) and river estuaries.

Cantaing-sur-Escaut (French pronunciation: [kɑ̃tɛ̃ syʁ ɛsko], literally Cantaing on Escaut) is a commune in the Nord department in northern France.

== Heraldry ==
Arms of Cantaing-sur-Escaut	The arms of Cantaing-sur-Escaut are blazoned : Argent, 3 lions azure, armed and langed gules.

== See also ==
- Communes of the Nord department
