= No. 32 Squadron RAF =

Royal Air Force flying squadron

No. XXXII Squadron RAF
- Squadron badge
- Active: 1916–1918 (RFC); 1918–1919; 1923–1969; 1969–present
- Country: United Kingdom
- Branch: Royal Air Force
- Type: Flying squadron
- Role: Command Support Air Transport
- Size: Two aircraft
- Part of: Air Mobility Force
- Station: RAF Northolt
- Mottos: Adeste comites (Latin for 'Rally round, comrades')
- Aircraft: Dassault Envoy IV CC1

Insignia
- Post 1950 roundel
- Tail codes: KT (Oct 1938 – Sep 1939); GZ (Sep 1939 – Nov 1942, Jul 1944 – May 1949)

No. 32 (The Royal) Squadron, also known as No.XXXII Squadron, is a squadron of the Royal Air Force. It operates the Dassault Envoy IV CC1 in the Command Support Air Transport role, transporting VIPs and carrying out general air transport roles. It is based at RAF Northolt in Greater London, England.

Originally formed in 1916 as part of the Royal Flying Corps, the squadron saw action during the First and Second World Wars with fighter aircraft, but was disbanded in 1969. The Metropolitan Communications Squadron, involved in the VIP transport role, was renamed as No. 32 Squadron at that time. In 1995, the squadron was merged with the Queen's Flight, and incorporated 'The Royal' title into its name. At this time, the squadron moved from RAF Benson in Oxfordshire to RAF Northolt in Greater London, where it remains.

The merger ended the RAF's provision of dedicated VIP transport aircraft; the squadron's aircraft are available to VIP passengers only if they are not needed for military operations. As of 2025, one flight within the squadron operates the Dassault Envoy IV CC1 fixed-wing aircraft.

== History ==
=== First World War (1916–1918) ===
No. 32 Squadron was formed as part of the Royal Flying Corps (RFC) on 12 January 1916 at Netheravon in Wiltshire, and moved to France as a fighter squadron equipped with the Airco DH.2 in May. On 1 July 1916, its commanding officer, Major (later Group Captain) Lionel Rees, was engaged in a combat with eight German Albatros two-seater aircraft, and although wounded in the leg, managed to scatter the German aircraft, driving down two of the enemy, for which action he was awarded the Victoria Cross.

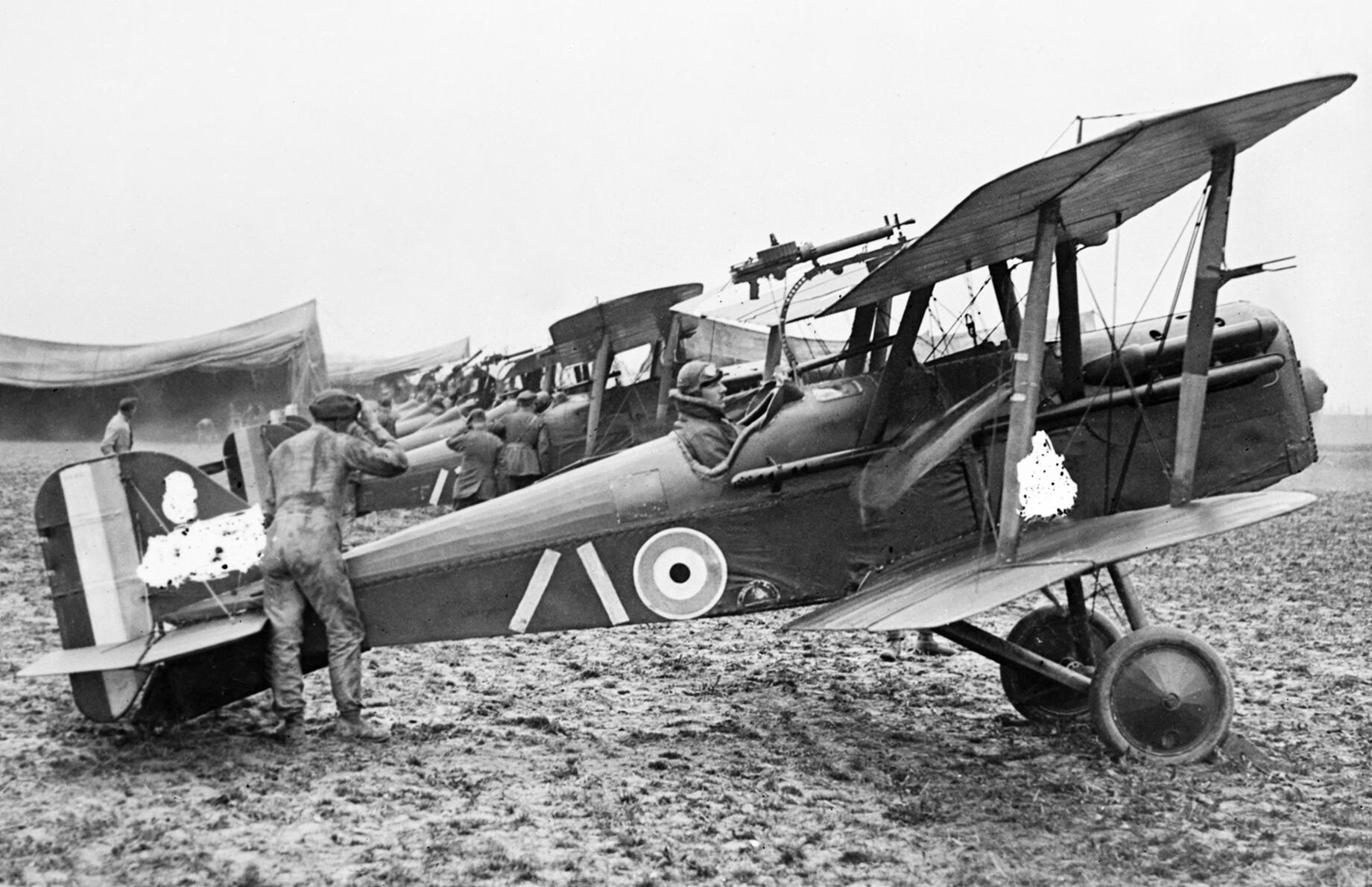
A fleet of Royal Aircraft Factory S.E.5a aircraft belonging to No. 32 Squadron (the wartime censor has scratched out registration numbers on the negative, but left the much more revealing squadron markings)

The squadron continued to fly patrols over the Western Front, including over the Somme and Arras battlefields, for a year before beginning to re-equip with the Airco DH.5, specialising in ground attack missions. These in turn began to be replaced by the Royal Aircraft Factory S.E.5a in December 1917, which were flown for the rest of the war on fighter and ground attack missions. On 1 April 1918, the squadron became part of the newly formed Royal Air Force (RAF). During the war, sixteen aces had served in its ranks, including future Air Marshal Arthur Coningham; Walter Tyrrell; Arthur Claydon; John Donaldson; Wilfred Green; Frank Hale; Hubert Jones; William Curphey; Maxmillian Mare-Montembault; and George Lawson.

=== Inter-war years (1919–1938) ===
In March 1919, the squadron returned to the United Kingdom as a cadre, and disbanded on 29 December 1919. It reformed on 1 April 1923 at RAF Kenley in Surrey as a single flight of Sopwith Snipe fighters. A second flight was formed on 10 December 1923, and a third brought the squadron up to full strength on 1 June 1924. The Gloster Grebe was received at the end of 1924, and was replaced by the Gloster Gamecock two years later. Equipped in succession with the Armstrong Whitworth Siskin, Bristol Bulldog, and Gloster Gauntlet, the squadron received the Hawker Hurricane I in October 1938.

=== Second World War (1939–1945) ===
In May 1940, the squadron flew patrols over northern France, and took part in the defence of south-east England, based at RAF Biggin Hill in Greater London, but operating daily from their forward airfield at RAF Hawkinge, near Folkestone, during the opening weeks of the Battle of Britain. The squadron moved to northern England at the end of August 1940. The squadron's Hurricanes saw little action throughout 1941, but did attempt, unsuccessfully, to escort the Fairey Swordfish biplanes of 825 Naval Air Squadron during their doomed attempt to stop the German warships Scharnhorst, Gneisenau, and Prinz Eugen during the Channel Dash on 12 February 1942. The squadron carried out a number of night intruder operations before being deployed overseas.

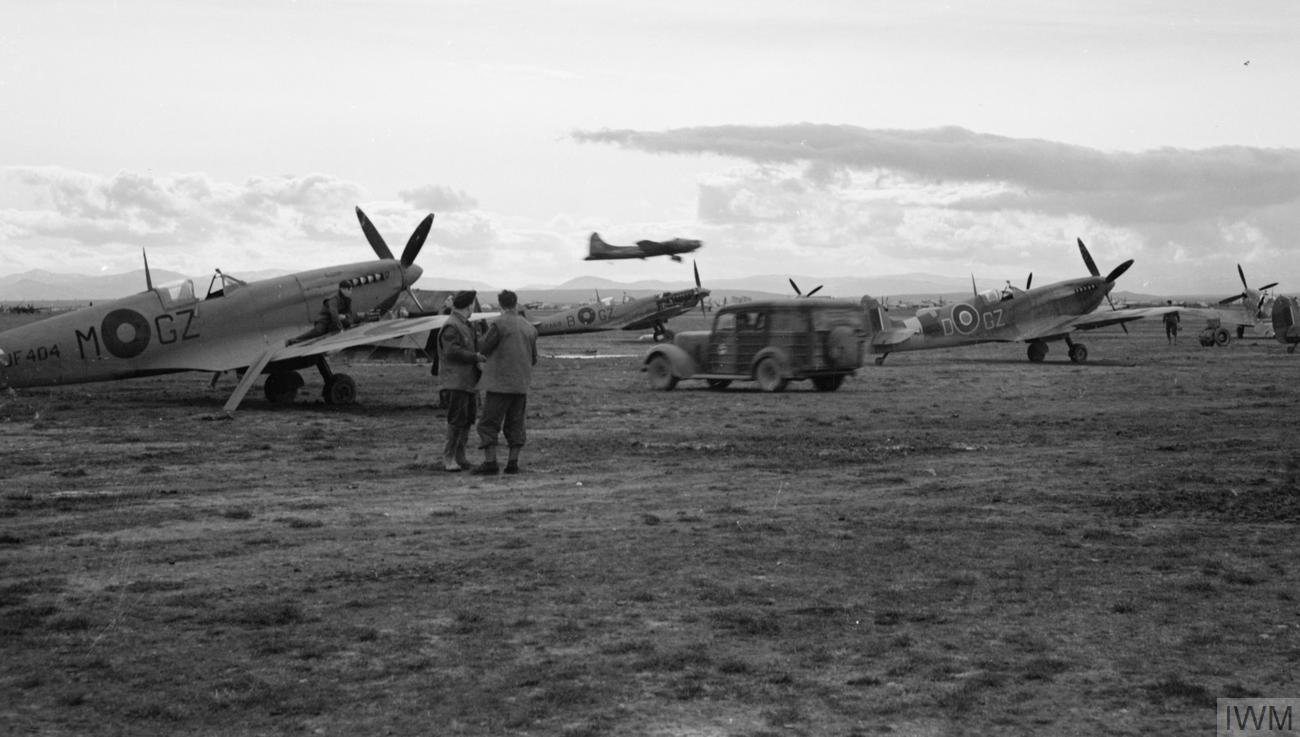
Supermarine Spitfires of No. 32 Squadron undergoing maintenance in a dispersal area at Foggia Main, Italy in 1943

Following Operation Torch, the Anglo-American invasion of North Africa, in December 1942, the squadron, commanded by John Shaw deployed with its Hurricanes to Algeria, converting to the Supermarine Spitfire by July 1943. Operations included a deployment to Greece, where it took part in the Greek Civil War from September 1944 to February 1945.

=== Cold War (1946–1990s) ===
==== Fighters ====
After the end of the Second World War, the squadron continued as a fighter unit, flying Spitfires, the de Havilland Vampire, and de Havilland Venom, from bases in Palestine, Cyprus, Egypt, the Persian Gulf, Malta, and Jordan. In January 1957, the squadron converted to the English Electric Canberra B.2 bombers at RAF Weston Zoyland in Somerset, flying from Cyprus.

==== VIP transport ====
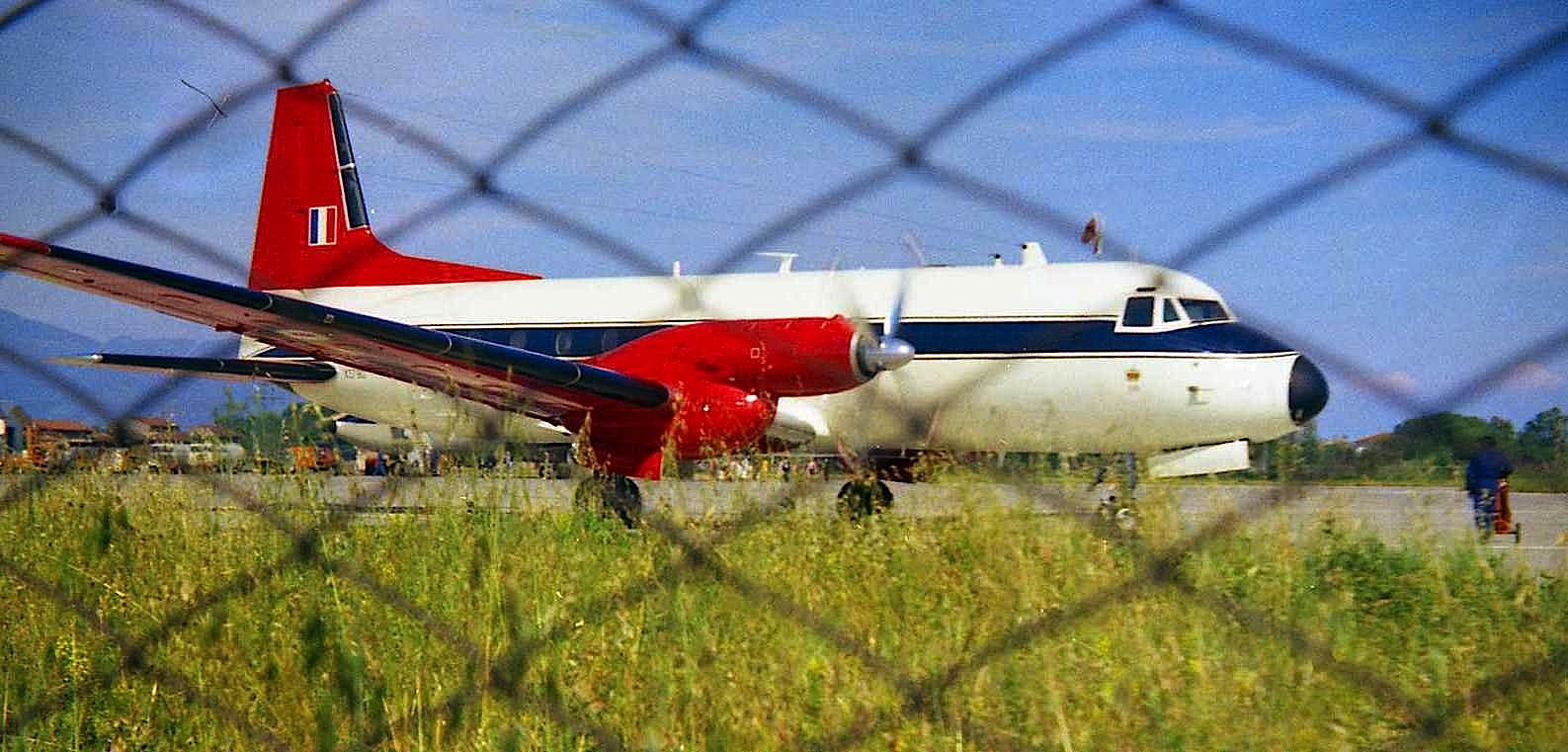
A Hawker Siddeley Andover CC.2 of No. 32 Squadron.

The squadron remained in Cyprus until disbanding on 3 February 1969. Simultaneously, the Metropolitan Communications Squadron was renamed No. 32 Squadron. It had formed on 8 April 1944 in the VIP air transport role, by the renaming of No. 510 Squadron. It operated a variety of aircraft, including the Hawker Siddeley Andover CC.2 and Westland Whirlwind HC.10 helicopters.

No. 32 Squadron acquired four Hawker Siddeley HS.125 CC1 business jets in 1971, these were Viper powered -400B series. These would be supplemented and then replaced by two HS.125 CC2 (-600B version) delivered in 1973, and six BAe 125 CC3 (Garrett-powered -700B version) delivered in 1982 and 1983. Westland Gazelle helicopters served with the squadron from 1976 onwards. These were replaced by initially two, later three Eurocopter Twin Squirrels in 1996.

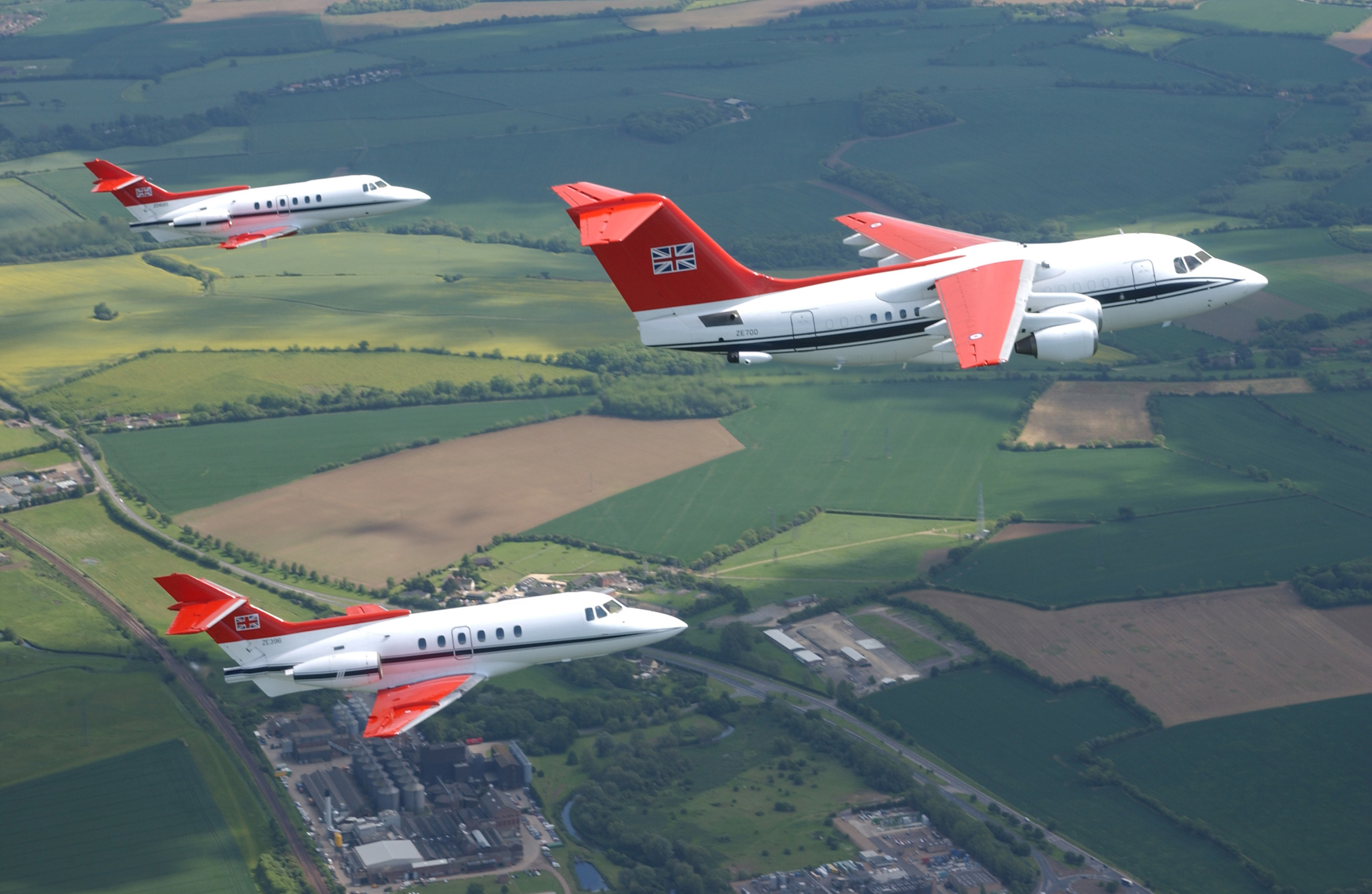
Two BAe 125 and one BAe 146 of the No. 32 Squadron. The squadron's aircraft flew with a distinctive red livery until it was replaced in 2004.

The RAF leased two BAe 146 in 1983 (designated BAe 146 CC1) as a test of their suitability to replace the Andover, which were operated by No. 241 Operational Conversion Unit. Two BAe 146-100 (designated BAe 146 CC2) were purchased in 1984 for the Queen's Flight as a result, with delivery in 1986. A third BAe 146 CC2 was purchased in 1989 and delivered in 1990, although it was subsequently sold in 2002. The BAe 146 provided a 60% increase in range compared with the Andover, and a larger interior capacity for more passengers.

On 1 April 1995, the Queen's Flight, equipped with these BAe 146 CC2, and Westland Wessex HCC.4 helicopters (the latter operated from 1969 until 1998), was merged into No. 32 Squadron, to become No. 32 (The Royal) Squadron, and moved to RAF Northolt from RAF Benson in Oxfordshire. The merger brought to an end the RAF's provision of dedicated VIP transport aircraft. The squadrons aircraft are available to VIP passengers only if not required for military operations, with the Ministry of Defence (MOD) stating in 1999: "the principal purpose of 32 Squadron [is] to provide communications and logistical support to military operations; the Squadron's capacity should be based on military needs only; and any royal or other non-military use of ... spare capacity is secondary to its military purpose".

=== 21st Century (2000– present) ===
Following a review by the MOD in 2004, the squadron's aircraft lost their distinctive livery inherited from The Queen's Flight, featuring red flying surfaces. This was due to the concern over the aircraft's vulnerability to terrorist attack, to make the aircraft look more 'civilian'.

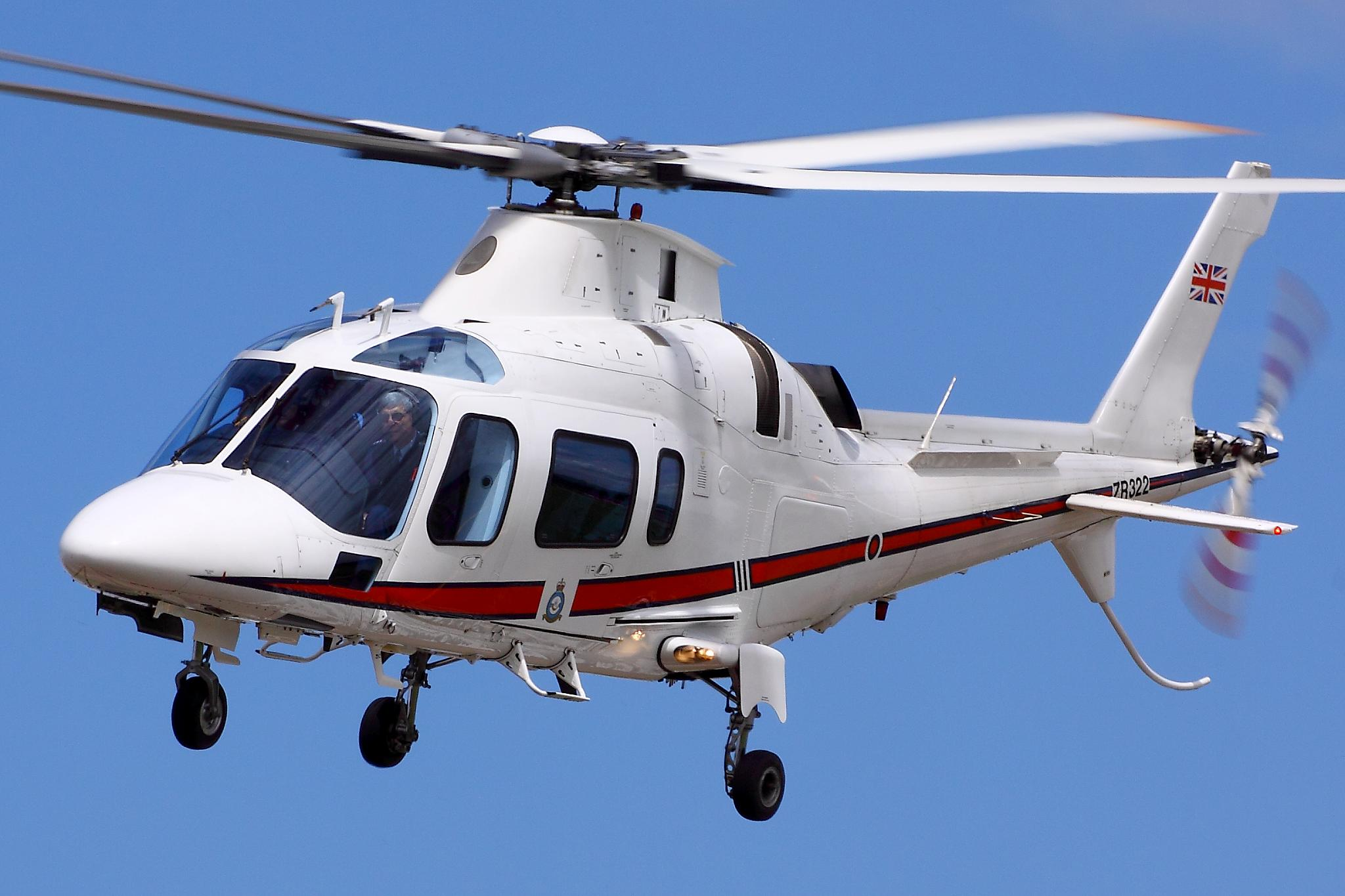
AgustaWestland AW109E Power Elite of No. 32 Squadron, at RIAT 2012

In May 2005, the Defence Logistics Organisation's Helicopter and Islander Combined Integrated Project Team awarded AgustaWestland a five-year contract from 1 April 2006 to provide three AgustaWestland AW109E to replace the three Twin Squirrels. This contract was extended on 31 March 2011, to allow two of the AW109E to continue in use for a further year.

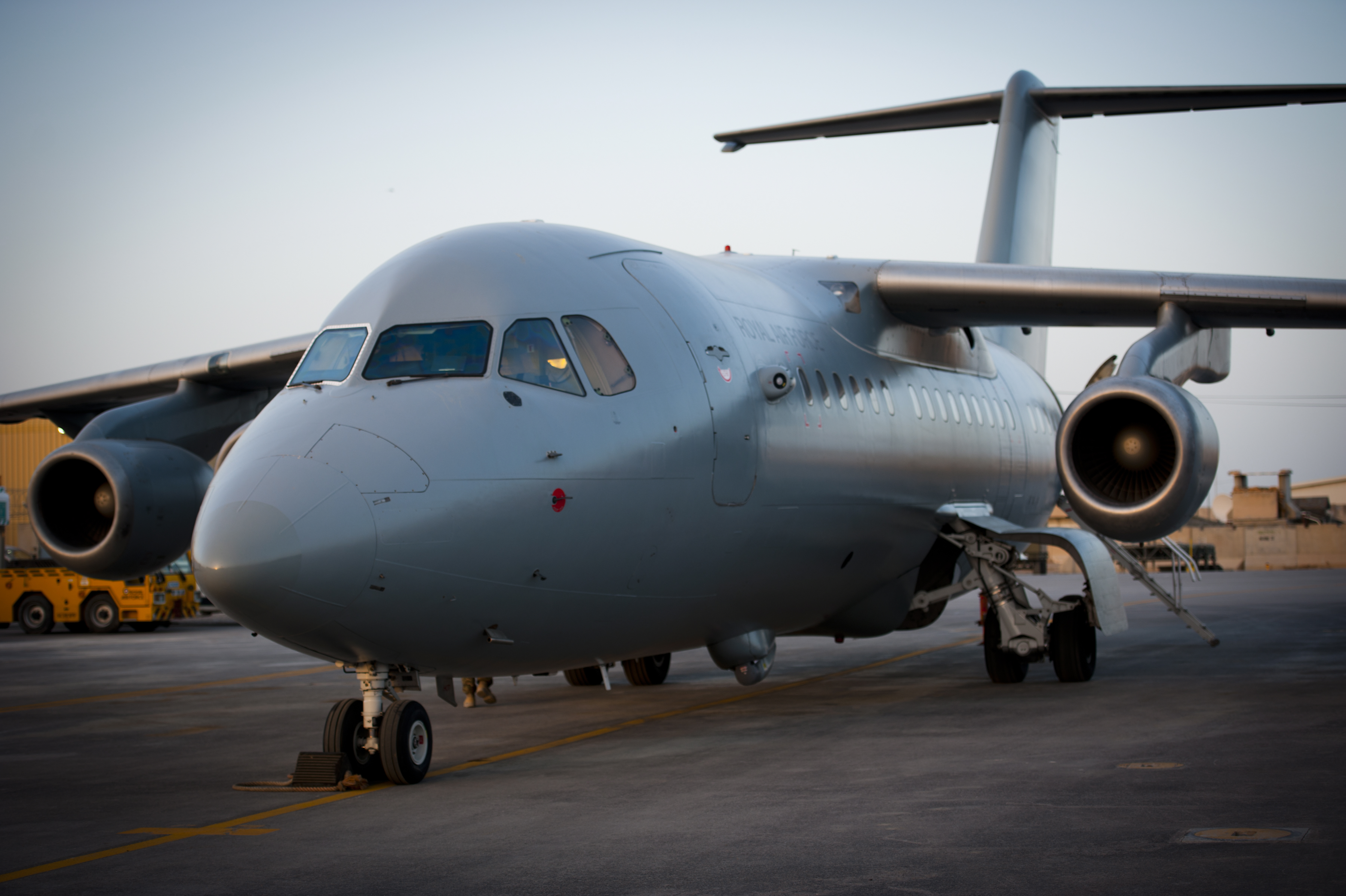
A No. 32 Squadron BAe 146 C3 (cargo configuration) at Kandahar Airfield, Afghanistan in 2014

Two additional BAe 146 were purchased in March 2012 from TNT Airways, and were refitted by Hawker Beechcraft on behalf of BAE Systems for tactical freight and personnel transport use. The aircraft, designated as the BAe 146 C3, arrived in Afghanistan in April 2013.

On 16 March 2015, the squadron's final BAe 125 returned from operations in Afghanistan, and the type's retirement from the RAF was brought forward due to defence budget cuts. Of the final four operational aircraft, three were put up for sale by the Ministry of Defence, and one (ZD621) was placed on permanent display as a gate guardian at RAF Northolt. The aircraft were retired from service seven years ahead of their original withdrawal date.

On 30 November 2015, a single AgustaWestland AW109SP GrandNew was delivered to the squadron to replace the unit's earlier AW109E which was withdrawn the following year.

On 11 October 2017, the Ministry of Defence announced that Her Majesty The Queen had approved the award of Battle Honours 'Iraq 2003–2011' and 'Libya 2011', both without the right to emblazon, to the squadron.

The squadron's two BAe 146 C3 were modified in 2020 for use in the medical support role, to carry patients and medical personnel into and out of smaller airfields than the RAF's Airbus Voyager multi-role tanker transport aircraft.

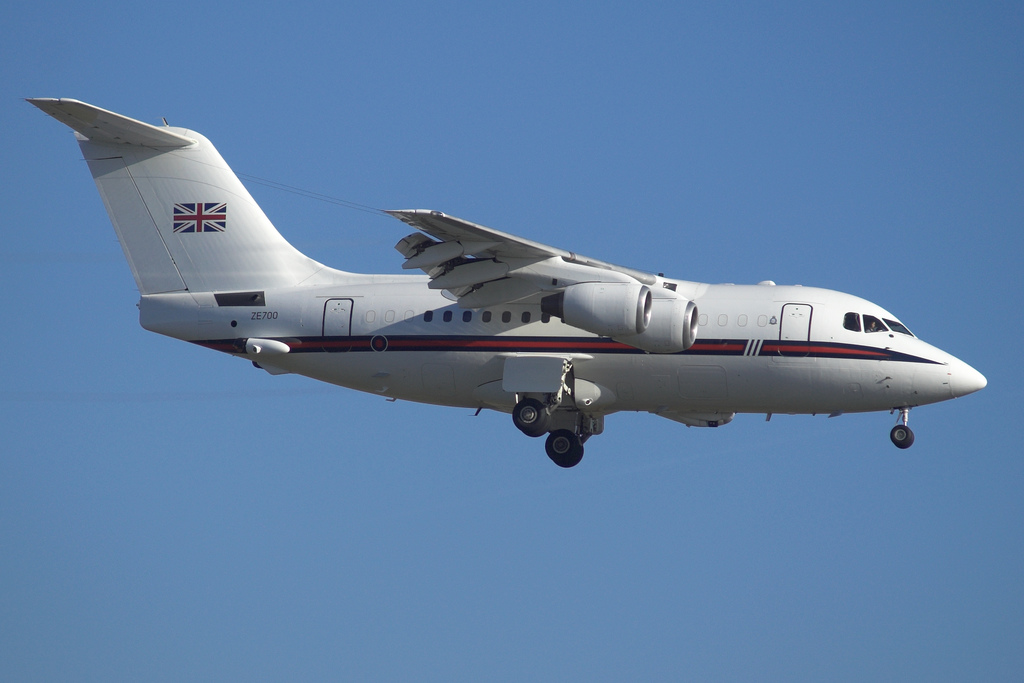
A BAe 146 CC2 in 2008. This aircraft has since been moved to the South Wales Aviation Museum for preservation and display.

The Integrated Review saw the fleet of four BAe 146 retired in March 2022. Shortly before, in February 2022, Defence Equipment and Support announced that the four aircraft would be replaced by two Dassault Falcon 900LX.

One of the BAe 146-100s (ZE701) was retired to the Imperial War Museum Duxford in Cambridgeshire, the other (ZE700) was gifted to the South Wales Aviation Museum at St Athan in March 2022. The two BAe 146-200 were removed from service and sold to civilian airline Pionair Australia.

In August 2023, it was announced that the Rotary Wing Command Support Air Transport contract, which provided the squadron's AgustaWestland AW109SP GrandNew, would not be renewed and would end on 30 September 2023. The Ministry of Defence later confirmed that the contract had been extended. The new Labour government subsequently cancelled the extension of the contract in August 2024, with effect from December 2024.

== Heritage ==
=== Badge and motto ===
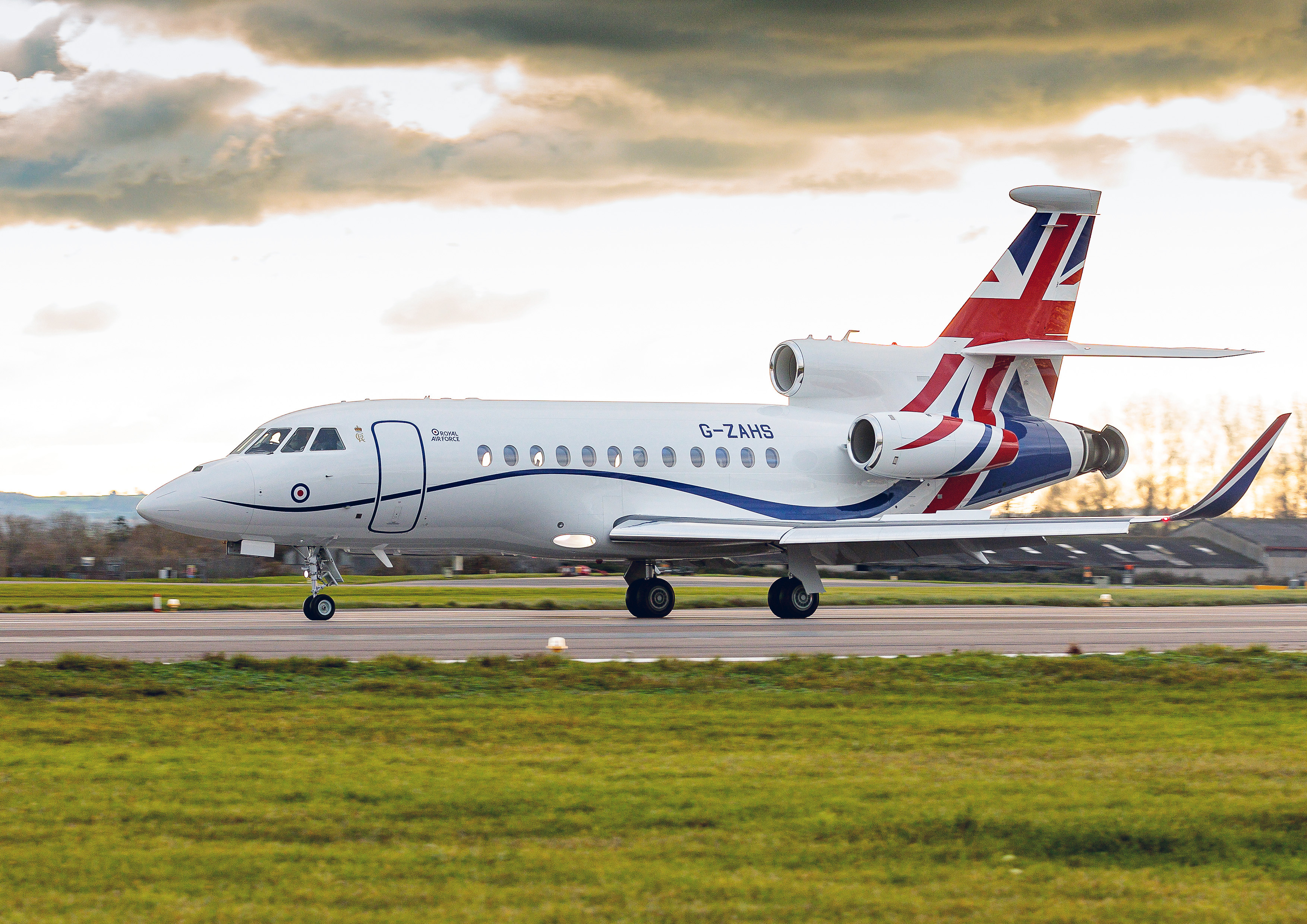
Dassault Envoy IV CC1 of No. 32 Squadron at RAF Northolt, in its 'Global Britain' livery, 2022

The squadron's badge features a hunting horn stringed, representing the unit's ability to hunt the enemy. It was approved by King George VI in December 1936.

The squadron's motto is Adeste Comites (Latin for 'Rally round, comrades').

=== Preserved aircraft ===
Two preserved examples of the squadron's Westland Wessex HCC.4 helicopters, originally operated by the Queen's Flight, can be seen at The Helicopter Museum located at Weston-super-Mare, Somerset, and the Royal Air Force Museum London (XV732) at Hendon, north London.

== Battle honours ==
No. 32 Squadron has received the following battle honours. Those marked with an asterisk (*) may be emblazoned on the squadron standard.

- Western Front (1916–1918)
- Somme (1916–1918)
- Arras (1916–1918)
- Ypres (1917)*
- Amiens (1917)*
- France and Low Countries (1939–1940)*
- Battle of Britain (1940)*
- Home Defence (1940–1942)
- Dieppe (1940–1942)*
- North Africa (1942–1943)*
- Italy (1943)
- South East Europe (1944–1945)*
- Gulf (1991)
- Iraq (2003–2011)
- Libya (2011)

== See also ==
- List of Royal Air Force aircraft squadrons
- Spirit of the Few Monument – sculptures of seven of the squadron's Second World War pilots
