= Jagdstaffel 52 =

Jasta 52
- Active: 1917–1918
- Country: German Empire
- Branch: Luftstreitkräfte
- Type: Fighter squadron
- Engagements: World War I

Royal Prussian Jagdstaffel 52, commonly abbreviated to Jasta 52, was a "hunting group" (i.e., fighter squadron) of the Luftstreitkräfte, the air arm of the Imperial German Army during World War I. The squadron would score over 42 aerial victories during the war. The unit's victories came at the expense of eight killed in action, one injured in a flying accident, one wounded in action, and one taken prisoner of war.

== History ==
Jasta 52 was founded at Flieger-Abteilung (Flier Detachment) 7, at Braunschweig, Germany on 27 December 1917. It became operational on 9 January 1918. On 14 January, it was moved to support 6 Armee. The new squadron flew its first combat missions 30 January. Paul Billik would score the unit's first aerial victories on 9 March 1918, and would go on to score about half his squadron's total. Jasta 52 would support 6 Armee for the remainder of the war.

== Commanding officers (Staffelführer) ==
- Leutnant Paul Billik: 27 December 1917 - 10 August 1918 (POW)
- Oberleutnant Berendonck: 10 August 1918 - November 1918

== Duty stations ==
- Pecq, Belgium: 14 January 1918
- Bersée, France
- Provin, France
- Gondecourt, France
- Auchy, France
- Tourpes, Belgium
- Hove, Belgium

== Notable personnel ==
- Paul Billik
- Hermann Juhnke
