= Edmund Nathanael =

German flying ace (1889–1917)

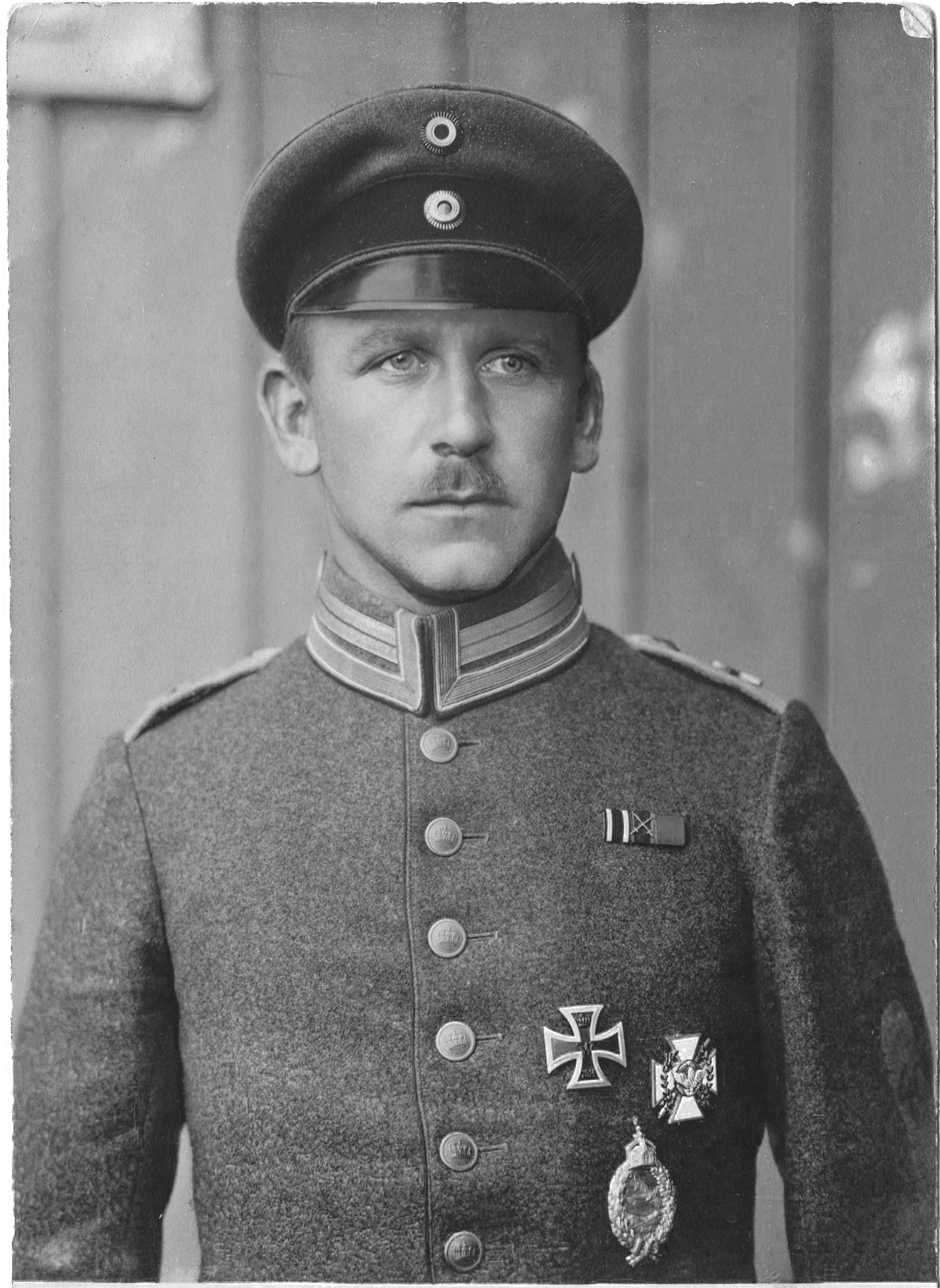
- Nathanael in March 1917
- Born: 18 December 1889; Dielsdorf, German Empire
- Died: 11 May 1917 (aged 27); Bourlon Wood, Belgium
- Military career
- Allegiance: German Empire
- Branch: Luftstreitkräfte
- Rank: Offiziersstellvertreter
- Units: Flieger-Abteilung (Artillerie) 42, Jagdstaffel 22, Jagdstaffel 5
- Awards: House Order of Hohenzollern, Iron Cross First Class, Wilhelm Ernst War Cross, General Honor Decoration in Gold with Swords

Offiziersstellvertreter Edmund Nathanael (18 December 1889 – 11 May 1917) was a World War I flying ace credited with 15 aerial victories. He flew both two-seater reconnaissance aircraft and single-seater fighter craft. He scored all his victories while flying for Royal Prussian Jagdstaffel 5, and received a rare award of the House Order of Hohenzollern for his valor. He was killed in action while serving the German Empire.

== Early life ==
Edmund Nathanael was born on 18 December 1889 in Dielsdorf, the German Empire.

== Reconnaissance service ==
It is not known if Edmund Nathanael first served in a ground unit, although that was the usual practice for German aviation volunteers. However, Nathanael's first aviation service was with Flieger-Abteilung (Artillerie) 42 (FAA 42). This unit operated two-seater reconnaissance aircraft and carried out the hazardous task of directing artillery fire from its aerial station. While serving with Flieger-Abteilung (Artillerie) 42, Nathanael served with enough distinction that he earned the seldom awarded Wilhelm Ernst War Cross from his native Grand Duchy of Saxe-Weimar-Eisenach, as well as the Grand Duchy's General Honor Decoration in Gold with Swords. The German military customarily seasoned its aviation personnel in combat; the most promising were then "promoted" to fighter pilots. The system conserved the single-seater fighter pilots, as they would not easily fall victim to rookie errors when they entered combat.

== Service in fighters ==
Nathanael was forwarded to a fighter unit in late 1916; it was then customary to reassign a pilot to one of the four national air forces that constituted the German Air Service. In Nathanael's case, his native Grand Duchy of Saxe-Weimar-Eisenach adjoined the Kingdom of Saxony. He was not only assigned to a Saxon squadron, he seemed to be a founding member of Royal Saxon Jagdstaffel 22, which formed in November 1916. He would serve with this unit until March 1917. He gained no victories while with this squadron. The squadron itself would amass 57 victories by war's end.

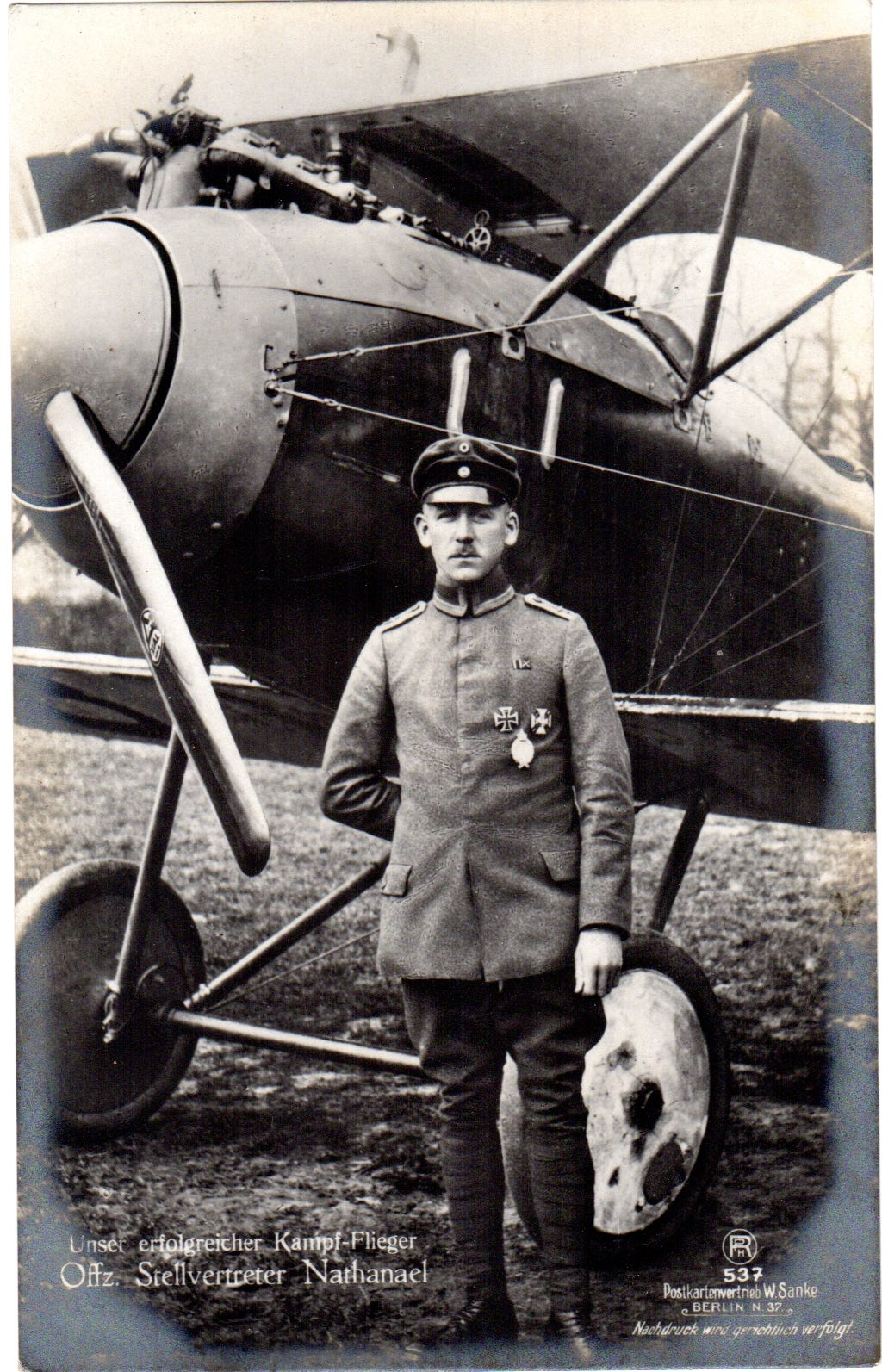
Nathanael in front of his Albatros D.III at Boistrancourt in March 1917

However, he served well enough that in March 1917, he transferred to the prestigious Royal Prussian Jagdstaffel 5. With this reassignment, he was posted to serve with some very successful aces—Renatus Theiller, Werner Voss, Hans Karl Müller, and Hans Berr among them. Nathanael was assigned to fly an Albatros D.V. In contrast to Jagdstaffel 22, Jagdstaffel 5 would be credited with 253 victories during World War I.

Nathanael scored his first aerial victory with Jagdstaffel 5 on 6 March; he would run his victory total to 15 in two months. Nathanael's 14th victory on 30 April 1917 made him the first pilot in history to shoot down an SE-5 (of No. 56 Squadron, Royal Flying Corps). Five days after his 15th victory was credited, Nathanael's plane was shot down in flames as the ninth of 21 victories of Scottish ace Captain William Kennedy-Cochran-Patrick of No. 23 Squadron RFC, which killed Nathanael in action. Captain Kennedy-Cochran-Patrick was flying Spad VII serial number B1580 when he shot down Nathanael.

Nathanael was one of only 18 German fliers to receive the House Order of Hohenzollern during the First World War.

== Controversy on Jewish faith/origin ==
Nathanael was listed, without proof of sources and likely because of his surname, as a German of Jewish faith/origins in the media on occasions. Extensive recent archival research has proven this to be untrue: he was of Protestant faith, and no Jewish family connections could be traced over the last 200 years.

== Aerial victories of Edmund Nathanael ==
All victories were scored while flying with Royal Prussian Jagdstaffel 5.

| No. | Date | Time | Opponent | Squadron | Location |
|---|---|---|---|---|---|
| 1 | 6 March 1917 | 1345 hours | Morane-Saulnier serial number A268 | Escadrille 3, Aéronautique Militaire | North of Guedecourt |
| 2 | 11 March 1917 | 1245 hours | Royal Aircraft Factory F.E.2b | No. 23 Squadron RFC | North of Beugny, France |
| 3 | 24 March 1917 | 0900 hours | Sopwith 1½ Strutter | No. 70 Squadron RFC | Écoust-Saint-Mein, France |
| 4 | 25 March 1917 | 0920 hours | Sopwith 1½ Strutter | No. 70 Squadron RFC | Vélu, France |
| 5 | 25 March 1917 | 0925 hours | Nieuport 17 | No. 29 Squadron RFC | East of Beugny, France |
| 6 | 2 April 1917 | Morning | Royal Aircraft Factory F.E.2b s/n 6953 | No. 22 Squadron RFC | Northeast of Gouzeaucourt Wood |
| 7 | 3 April 1917 | 1635 hours | Royal Aircraft Factory F.E.2b s/n 4987 | No. 23 Squadron RFC | North of Boursies, France |
| 8 | 6 April 1917 | 0820 hours | Royal Aircraft Factory F.E.2b s/n A6388 | No. 57 Squadron RFC | Douchy |
| 9 | 13 April 1917 | 1935 hours | Observation balloon s/n 34-16-4 | | West of Saint Quentin |
| 10 | 22 April 1917 | 1410 hours | Observation balloon s/n 3-13-5 | | Bus, Pas-de-Calais, France |
| 11 | 22 April 1917 | 2005 hours | Spad | No. 23 Squadron RFC | Ribecourt |
| 12 | 28 April 1917 | 1315 hours | Sopwith 1½ Strutter s/n/A993 | No. 43 Squadron RFC | Vacquerie-le-Boucq, France |
| 13 | 29 April 1917 | 2100 hours | Nieuport fighter s/n A6745 | No. 40 Squadron RFC | Beaumont |
| 14 | 30 April 1917 | 1005 hours | Royal Aircraft Factory S.E.5 s/n A4866 | No. 56 Squadron RFC | East of Fresnoy, France |
| 15 | 6 May 1917 | 1840 hours | Nieuport 17 | No. 60 Squadron RFC | North of Bourlon, France |
