= Douglas McGregor (aviator) =

Canadian aviator

Douglas Urquhart McGregor
- Born: March 3, 1895; Waterdown, Ontario, Canada
- Died: June 9, 1953 (aged 58); Hamilton, Ontario, Canada
- Military career
- Allegiance: George V of the British Empire
- Branch: Royal Flying Corps
- Rank: Captain
- Nickname: "Mac"
- Units: No. 23 Squadron RFC, No. 49 Squadron RFC
- Awards: Military Cross

Captain Douglas Urquhart McGregor was a Canadian World War I flying ace credited with 12 official aerial victories.

== Early life ==
Douglas Urquhart McGregor was the son of Doctor John O. McGregor. The younger McGregor attended McGill University and played on their Redmen football team during the early years of World War I.

== World War I ==
McGregor joined the Royal Flying Corps in 1916. He sailed from Halifax, Nova Scotia for England aboard the Corsican on 25 September 1916. He was commissioned as a temporary probational second lieutenant on 6 October 1916. On 7 December 1916, in a mistaken attempt to correct his name, the London Gazette changed his middle name to "Urchart".

After being trained, McGregor joined 23 Squadron at Baisieux on 20 April 1917 as a Spad VII pilot. He survived Bloody April to begin his streak of aerial successes on 13 May 1917. On that day, he teamed with Conn Standish O'Grady to set a German Albatros D.III aflame in midair. On 6 June at dawn, he shot up the German aerodrome at Chateau du Sart. He scored again on 6 July, when he teamed with William Kennedy-Cochran-Patrick and another pilot to set a German reconnaissance two-seater on fire. The following day, he again teamed with William Kennedy-Cochran-Patrick to set another German recon machine afire over Houthoulst Forest; five minutes later, he burned another one on his own. On 13 and 15 July, he would send down enemy planes out of control.

August saw him score another out-of-control win on the 7th, then flame one German on the 16th and destroy another. On 19 August 1917, he was appointed Flight Commander with concomitant rank of captain. A week later, he led his flight by scoring twice more. Exactly a month later, on 26 September 1917, he ended his tally by destroying an Albatros D.V. His final total was two enemy planes set afire, two other enemy planes flamed in concert with other pilots, three enemy planes destroyed, a victory for sharing in destroying another German plane, and four enemy planes driven down out of control.

26 September 1917 also saw him awarded the Military Cross in the name of Douglas Urchart McGregor. The accompanying award citation gives insight into McGregor's exploits: For conspicuous gallantry and devotion to duty in leading patrols against hostile formations. He has attacked and driven down enemy aircraft on several occasions, in spite of their being in superior numbers, displaying in every instance splendid dash and determination to get to close range.

== Post World War I ==
McGregor became a physician after the war. He died unexpectedly while attending a wrestling match, on 9 June 1953, in Hamilton, Ontario, Canada.
