= Eric Olivier =

South African cricketer and World War I flying ace

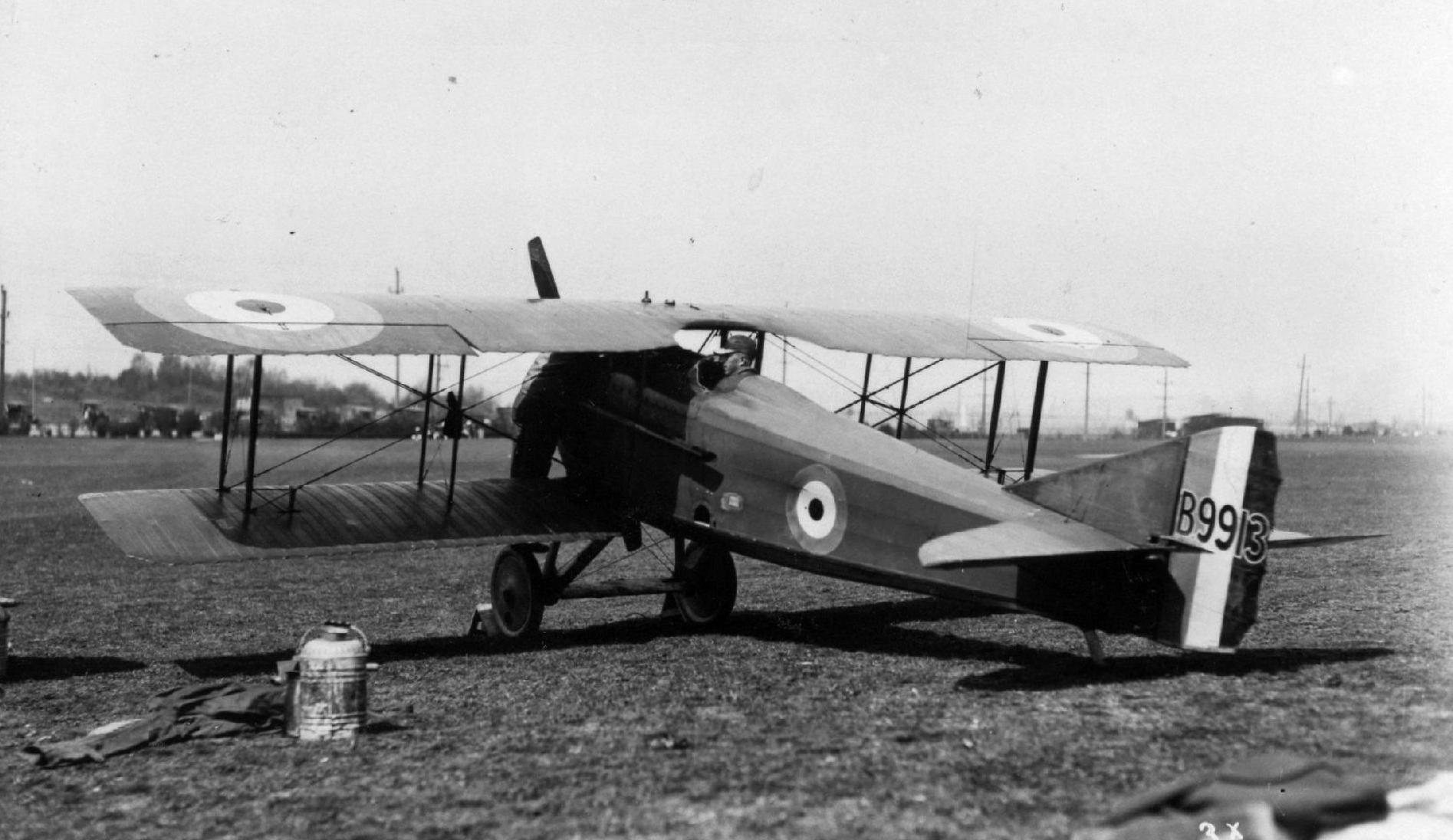

Personal information
- Full name: Eric Olivier
- Born: 24 November 1888; Oudtshoorn, Cape Colony
- Died: 1 June 1925 (aged 36); Cape Town, Cape Province, South Africa
- Batting: Right-handed
- Bowling: Right-arm fast-medium

Domestic team information
- Years: Team
- 1908–1909: Cambridge University
- 1911: Hampshire

Career statistics
Competition	First-class
Matches	22
Runs scored	302
Batting average	11.18
100s/50s	–/–
Top score	43
Balls bowled	3,893
Wickets	90
Bowling average	22.62
5 wickets in innings	8
10 wickets in match	4
Best bowling	8/51
Catches/stumpings	9/–
- Source: Cricinfo, 26 December 2009

Eric Olivier (24 November 1888 — 1 June 1925) was a South African first-class cricketer who played in England for Cambridge University and Hampshire prior to the First World War. During the war, he served in the Royal Flying Corps and became a flying ace credited with eight victories.

== Early life and first-class cricket ==
Olivier was born in Oudtshoorn, then in the British South African Cape Colony. He was educated in England at Repton School, where he played for the school cricket team. before matriculating to Trinity Hall, Cambridge. At Cambridge, he made his debut in first-class cricket for Cambridge University Cricket Club against Yorkshire at Fenner's in 1908. He played first-class cricket for Cambridge until 1909, making fifteen appearances; amongst these were two appearances in The University Match at Lord's against Oxford University. Playing as a right-arm fast-medium bowler, he took 83 wickets at an average of 20.20; he took eight five wicket hauls and took ten wickets in a match on four occasions. His best innings figures of 8 for 51 came against G.J.V. Weigall's XI in 1908. As a lower order batsman, he scored 215 runs with a highest score of 34 not out. In addition to playing cricket at Cambridge, he also played football for Cambridge University A.F.C., gaining a blue.

In 1911, Olivier played county cricket for Hampshire, making his debut in the County Championship against Leicestershire at Portsmouth. He played seven times for Hampshire in the County Championship, taking 7 wickets at an average of 51.28, with best figures of 4 for 30. Shortly after, he returned to South Africa, where he played minor matches for South Western Districts against the Marylebone Cricket Club in 1913.

== First World War and later life ==
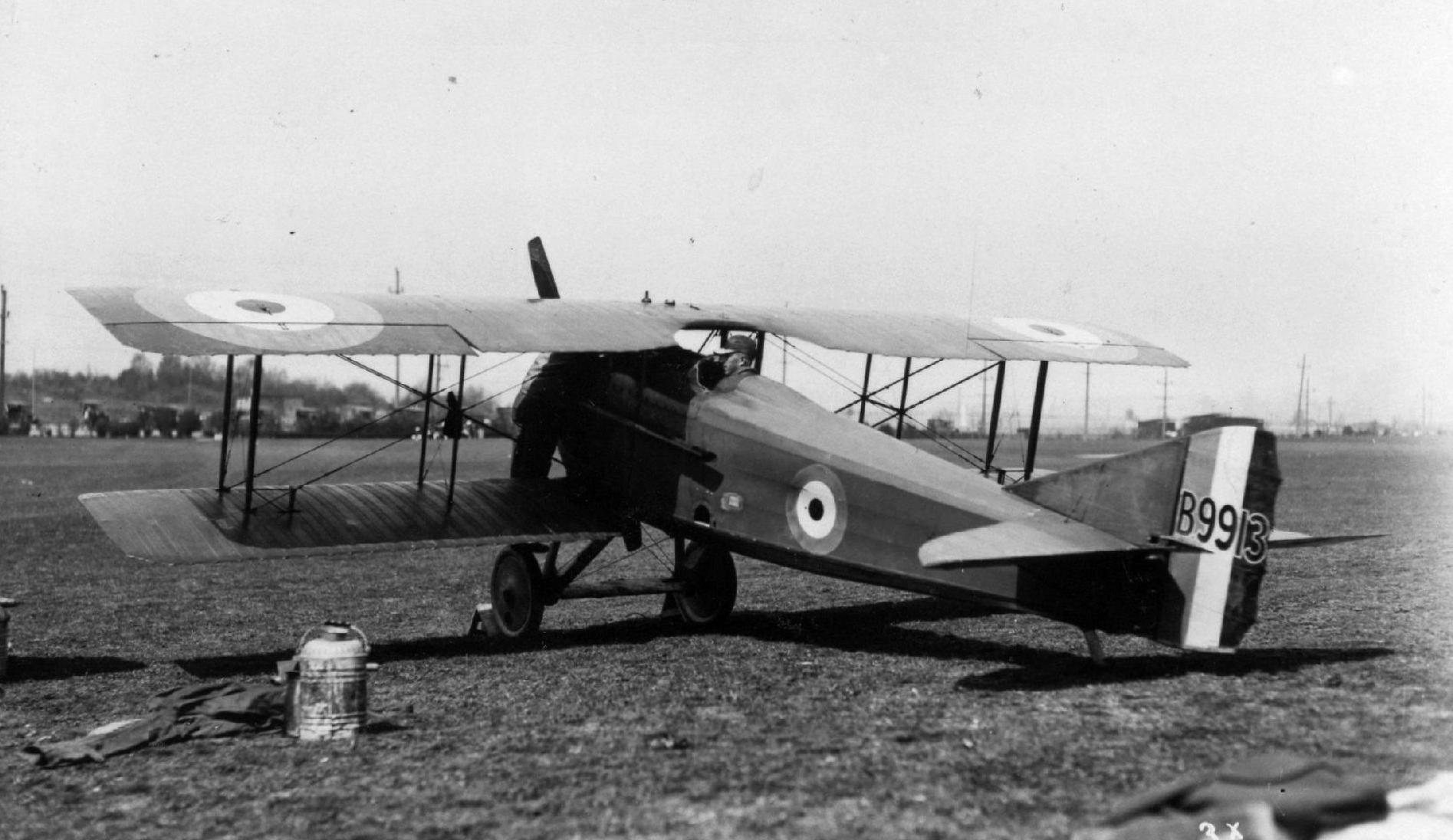
Olivier first flew the SPAD S.VII (pictured) with the Royal Flying Corps.

In the First World War Olivier first served as a trooper in the Union Defence Force during the South-West Africa Campaign. In March 1917, he was commissioned as a temporary second lieutenant (on probation) on the General List to serve in the British Army's Royal Flying Corps (RFC). He was appointed a flying officer on 8 May, and was confirmed in his rank on 16 July.

Olivier was posted to No. 19 Squadron to fly the SPAD S.VII single-seater fighter aircraft. He gained his first aerial victory on 26 October 1917 by driving down out of control a German Type C reconnaissance aircraft south-west of Geluwe, and on 31 October he drove down an Albatros D.V over Geluwe. On 15 November, he and Major Albert D. Carter shared in the destruction of another Type C over Zandvoorde. Three days later, on 18 November, Olivier, Carter and Lieutenant A. Reid-Walker, drove down a Type C over Passchendaele. He gained his fifth victory, and "ace" status, on 6 December, when he, Captain Oliver Bryson and Lieutenants Arthur Fairclough and R. G. Holt, drove down another Type C east of Roeselare. His last victory in the SPAD came on 22 December, by sharing in the shooting down in flames of an Albatros D.V south of Le Quesnoy with Major Carter, Captains Bryson and G. W. Taylor, Lieutenant Fairclough, and Second Lieutenants E. J. Blyth and H. E. Galer. By January 1918 No. 19 Squadron had been re-equipped with the Sopwith Dolphin. On 17 March, flying this new aircraft, Olivier and Fairclough shot down in flames an Albatros D.V north-east of Menen, and shortly after Olivier accounted for a Pfalz D.III over Roeselare. Lieutenant Olivier was transferred to the Royal Air Force's (which had subsumed the RFC) unemployed list in December 1918.

Olivier died in South Africa at Cape Town in June 1925.
