= Arthur Fairclough =

Arthur Fairclough may refer to:

- Arthur Fairclough (football manager) (1873–?), football club manager
- Arthur Bradfield Fairclough (1896–1968), World War I flying ace
