= Harold Albert White =

- Born: 14 February 1896; Stogumber, Somerset, England
- Died: December 1970 (aged 74); Aylmer, Ontario, Canada
- Military career
- Allegiance: England
- Branch: Aviation
- Rank: Lieutenant
- Nickname: Pete
- Unit: No. 23 Squadron RAF
- Awards: Distinguished Flying Cross

Lieutenant Harold Albert White was a Canadian World War I flying ace credited with seven aerial victories while flying the Sopwith Dolphin.

White was the son of Baptist minister Frederick T. White. The younger White emigrated to Brantford, Ontario, Canada, where he worked as an engineer. He joined 23 Squadron in 1918. He flew as James William Pearson's wingman in a Sopwith Dolphin. He scored his first victory on 28 June 1918; the following day, he split a victory with Arthur Bradfield Fairclough and several other pilots. By the time he wrapped up his tally on 20 September, he had sent three Fokker D.VII fighters on fire and sent four other enemy fighters down out of control.
