= Douglas Macgregor (disambiguation) =

Douglas McGregor (1906–1964) was an American psychologist and professor of management

Douglas Macgregor (or McGregor or MacGregor) may also refer to:

- Douglas McGregor (aviator) (1895–1953), Canadian World War I flying ace
- Douglas Macgregor (born 1947), retired US military officer and author
- Doug MacGregor (born 1977), Canadian musician, drummer for Constantines
