= Conn Standish O'Grady =

Irish flying ace of the First World War

Standish Conn O'Grady
- Born: 4 January 1888; Ireland
- Died: 7 May 1968 (aged 80)
- Relatives: Standish James O'Grady (father)
- Military career
- Allegiance: United Kingdom
- Branch: British Army; Royal Air Force
- Service years: 1916–1919; 1940–1944
- Rank: Squadron Leader
- Unit: No. 23 Squadron RFC
- Conflicts: World War I • Western Front; World War II
- Awards: Military Cross; Air Force Cross
- Other work: Civil engineer and lecturer

Squadron Leader Standish Conn O'Grady (Note: The London Gazette lists him as Conn Standish O'Grady from 1916 to 1919, then as Standish Conn O'Grady, his birth name, thereafter. In his personal life he was known as "Conn".) MC, AFC (4 January 1888 – 7 May 1968) was an Irish flying ace of the First World War, credited with nine aerial victories. He returned to military service, serving as an instructor, during the Second World War. A civil engineer by profession, he later became a lecturer at Durham University.

== Early life ==
O'Grady was born in Ireland on 4 January 1888, the third and youngest son of the journalist, historian and writer Standish James O'Grady (1846–1928) and his wife Margaret (née Fisher). He graduated from Trinity College, Dublin, in 1910 with Bachelor of Arts and Bachelor of Engineering degrees, and worked as a hydraulic engineer for the Congested Districts Board for Ireland before moving to Canada to work for the Department of the Interior's Dominion Water Power and Reclamation Service.

== World War I ==
O'Grady was in Canada on the outbreak of war, eventually returning to England, where on 25 July 1916 he was commissioned as a second lieutenant (on probation) to serve in the Royal Flying Corps. He did his basic flight training with No. 7 Reserve Squadron in September and October 1916, and was appointed a flying officer on 31 October. His training continued as part of "C" Squadron at the Central Flying School, Upavon, Wiltshire, from October to December 1916, being confirmed in his rank on 17 November. He was with No. 8 Reserve Squadron from December 1916 to February 1917, then returned to "C" Squadron at the Central Flying School, in March 1917.

O'Grady was then posted to No. 23 Squadron RFC based at Baizieux, France, to fly the SPAD S.VII single-seat fighter, gaining his first aerial victory on 30 April. Further victories followed on 13 May and 24 June, and he was promoted to lieutenant on 1 August, and appointed a flight commander with the temporary rank of captain on 11 August. He gained six more victories by 26 August to bring his total to nine. He was then transferred to the Home Establishment in September 1917.

O'Grady was awarded the Military Cross on 25 September 1917. His citation, published on 9 January 1918, read:

Second Lieutenant Conn Standish O'Grady, Royal Flying Corps, Special Reserve.

"For conspicuous gallantly and devotion to duty in leading fighting patrols against superior numbers of enemy aircraft. He has himself brought down three enemy machines completely out of control, and others were seen to be destroyed, and his dash and determination when outnumbered by the enemy have continually won the highest praise."

O'Grady was transferred to the RAF's unemployed list on 24 May 1919.

=== List of aerial victories ===
Combat record
No.	Date/Time	Aircraft/ Serial No.	Opponent	Result	Location	Notes
1	30 April 1917 @ 1640	SPAD S.VII (A262)	Albatros D.III	Driven down out of control	Inchy-en-Artois	
2	13 May 1917 @ 1900	SPAD S.VII	Albatros D.III	Set afire; destroyed	Vitry	Shared with Second Lieutenant Douglas McGregor.
3	24 June 1917 @ 1610	SPAD S.VII (B3464)	Albatros D.III	Set afire; destroyed	Sint-Jan	Shared with Captain William Kennedy-Cochran-Patrick and Second Lieutenant George Ivan Douglas Marks.
4	12 August 1917 @ 0620	SPAD S.VII (B3556)	Albatros D.III	Destroyed	Gheluvelt	Shared with Second Lieutenant Clive Wilson Warman.
5	14 August 1917 @ 1905–1915	SPAD S.VII (B3556)	Albatros D.III	Destroyed	East of Saint-Julien	
6	14 August 1917 @ 1905–1915	SPAD S.VII (B3556)	Reconnaissance aircraft	Destroyed	East of Saint-Julien	Shared with Second Lieutenants George Ivan Douglas Marks, C. F. Briggs and T. A. Doran.
7	20 August 1917 @ 1945	SPAD S.VII (B3556)	Albatros D.V	Set afire; destroyed	Poelcappelle	
8	26 August 1917 @ 0650–0700	SPAD S.VII (B3556)	Albatros D.V	Driven down out of control	North of Passchendaele	
9	26 August 1917 @ 0650–0700	SPAD S.VII (B3556)	Albatros D.V	Driven down out of control	North of Comines	

== Inter-war career ==
O'Grady returned to his pre-war career, initially working for Boving & Co. Ltd., before setting up as a consulting engineer. In 1931 he was appointed a lecturer in Civil Engineering at Armstrong College in Newcastle, part of Durham University.

O'Grady also retained his interest in flying, being granted a commission as a flying officer (Class "A") on probation in the General Duties Branch of the Reserve of Air Force Officers on 10 February 1925, and was confirmed in his rank on 10 August. He was promoted to flight lieutenant on 31 January 1928, but was transferred from Class "A" to Class "C" on 10 February 1933.

== World War II ==
O'Grady returned to active service in the Reserve of Air Force Officers during the Second World War, serving as an instructor at No. 5 Air Observers Navigation School based at RAF Weston-super-Mare from May to August 1940, then at No. 45 Air School in Oudtshoorn, South Africa, from October 1941 to October 1943, also receiving promotion to the temporary rank of squadron leader on 24 July 1942. On 1 January 1944 he was awarded the Air Force Cross in the New Year Honours list. On 24 March 1944 he relinquished his commission and was permitted to retain the rank of squadron leader.

== Post-war career ==
O'Grady returned to Durham in 1944 to become Senior Lecturer, eventually retiring in 1954. Outside of his profession O'Grady was also a keen fencer, yachtsman and mountaineer, but his primary interest was gliding. He was a member of both the Yorkshire and Newcastle Gliding Clubs, becoming chief flying instructor of the latter, and remained an active glider pilot into the 1950s. He was also an elected member of the Institution of Civil Engineers from 1919 until 1961.
