= RAF Wye =

Temporary airfield in Kent, England

RAF Wye
- Near Wye, Kent in England

Site information
- Type: Airfield
- Owner: Air Ministry
- Operator: Royal Flying Corps; Royal Air Force
- Condition: Closed

Location
- Coordinates: 51°11′30″N 0°55′32″E

Site history
- Built: 1916
- Built by: Vickers / RFC
- In use: 1916–1919
- Battles/wars: First World War

Royal Air Force Wye or RAF Wye was temporary Royal Flying Corps First World War training airfield at Wye, Kent, England.

== History ==
Wye aerodrome was opened in May 1916 by the Royal Flying Corps as a training airfield, it had a grass landing field and was located on 86 acres (35 ha) of low-lying meadow between the main Canterbury to Ashford road and the railway line. No. 20 Reserve Squadron moved from nearby Dover on 1 June 1916, it operated the Avro 504 biplane trainer, the Royal Aircraft Factory RE.8 a two-seat biplane reconnaissance and bomber and the Royal Aircraft Factory B.E.2 reconnaissance biplane. In January 1917 No. 51 Reserve Squadron arrived as the demand for aircrew for the Western Front increased and in May 1917 a third squadron (No. 66 Reserve Squadron) was formed from personnel and equipment from the two squadrons. At the end of May the Reserve Squadrons (now renamed Training Squadrons) moved out of Wye when the aerodrome was allocated for use as an Anglo-American training airfield.

Three metal-clad aeroplane sheds were erected to join the original portable Bessonneau hangar and in May 1917 65 Squadron was based with Sopwith Camels for four months before it moved to France. No. 86 Squadron moved in from Dover with Sopwith Pup and Sopwith Camel biplane fighters to train at the end of 1917. In December 1917 No. 42 Training Squadron arrived and continued to train British pilots which were joined in the mid-1918 by Americans trainees. Following the Armistice with Germany the Americans departed but the training carried on, albeit not at the same pace until the training squadron was disbanded on 1 February 1919.

Between February and May 1919 the aerodrome was used by 3 Squadron when it returned from France. RAF Wye was declared surplus to requirements in October 1919 and was restored to agricultural use.

== Royal Flying Corps/Royal Air Force units and aircraft ==
Unit	Dates	Aircraft	Notes
No. 3 Squadron RAF	15 February 1919 - 2 May 1919	Sopwith Camel	On return from France as cadre
No. 61 Squadron RFC	5 July 1916 - 24 August 1916	None	Used personnel from No. 20 Reserve Squadron
No. 65 Squadron RFC	29 May 1917 - 24 October 1917	Sopwith Camel	Moved to France
No. 86 Squadron RFC	17 September 1917 - 16 December 1917	Various	
No. 20 Training Squadron RFC	24 July 1916 - 1 June 1917	Avro 504, BE.2c, RE.8	Also known as 20 Reserve Squadron
No. 42 Training Squadron RFC/RAF	16 December 1917 - 1 February 1919	Various	Also known as 42 Reserve Squadron
No. 51 Training Squadron RFC	8 January 1917 - 14 May 1917	Various	Also known as 51 Reserve Squadron
No. 66 Reserve Squadron RFC	1 May 1917 - 10 May 1917	Various	

== Accidents and incidents ==
On 15 March 1917 Captain Oliver Bryson was awarded the Albert Medal for his rescue of his passenger following a crash at Wye Aerodrome:

On the 15th March, 1917, Captain (then Lieutenant) Bryson, with Second Lieutenant Hillebrandt as passenger, was piloting an aeroplane at Wye Aerodrome when, owing to a sideslip, the machine crashed to the ground and burst into flames. On disentangling himself from the burning wreckage Captain Bryson at once went back into the flames, dragged Lieutenant Hillebrandt from the machine, and notwithstanding his own injuries, which were undoubtedly aggravated by his gallant efforts to rescue his brother officer from the fire, endeavoured to extinguish the fire on Lieutenant Hillebrandt's clothing. Lieutenant Hillebrandt succumbed to his injuries a few; days later.

— London Gazette
