= Harry Compton =

Harry Neville Compton
- Born: 9 April 1899; Winnipeg, Manitoba, Canada
- Died: 1951 (aged 51–52); Toronto, Ontario, Canada
- Military career
- Allegiance: George V
- Branch: Engineers, then flying service
- Rank: Lieutenant
- Units: Canadian Military Engineers; No. 23 Squadron RAF
- Awards: Distinguished Flying Cross

Lieutenant Harry Neville Compton was a World War I flying ace credited with five aerial victories.

Compton originally served with the Canadian Military Engineers, transferring to the Royal Flying Corps on 14 February 1918. That summer, he was posted to No. 23 Squadron on the Western Front, to fly Sopwith Dolphins. He scored his first victory on 1 July 1918, when he destroyed an Albatros D.V near Hangest. He destroyed a Pfalz D.III and a Fokker D.VII fighter, and drove down another D.VII out of control before tallying his last victory. That was over a DFW reconnaissance two-seater on 1 November 1918, and was shared with fellow ace James William Pearson.
