= Otto-Wilhelm Förster =

German general (1885–1966)

- Born: 16 March 1885
- Died: 24 June 1966 (aged 81)
- Military career
- Allegiance: German Empire; Weimar Republic; Nazi Germany
- Branch: German Army
- Service years: 1903–1944
- Rank: General der Pioniere
- Commands: VI Army Corps
- Conflicts: World War I; World War II; Battle of France; Operation Barbarossa; Battle of Białystok–Minsk; Battle of Smolensk (1941); Battle of Moscow
- Awards: Knight's Cross of the Iron Cross

Otto-Wilhelm Förster (16 March 1885 – 24 June 1966) was a general in the German Army during World War II who commanded several corps. He was a recipient of the Knight's Cross of the Iron Cross.

Förster entered military service in 1903 and fought in World War I. After the war, he remained in the peacetime Reichswehr. He fought in World War II and retired from active duty in January 1944. He was arrested by the Soviet authorities following the war. Convicted as a war criminal in the Soviet Union, he was held until 1955.

== Awards and decorations ==
- Knight's Cross of the House Order of Hohenzollern with Swords
- Iron Cross (1914)
  - 2nd Class
  - 1st Class
- Hanseatic Cross of Hamburg
- Knight's Cross Second Class of the Order of the White Falcon with Swords (Weimar)
- Wilhelm Ernst War Cross (Saxe-Meiningen)
- Cross for Merit in War (Saxe-Meiningen)
- Clasp to the Iron Cross (1939)
  - 2nd Class
  - 1st Class
- Knight's Cross of the Iron Cross on 23 August 1941 as General der Pioniere and commander of VI. Armeekorps

Military offices
Preceded by General der Artillerie Günther von Kluge	Commander of VI. Armeekorps; 24 November 1938 – 31 December 1941	Succeeded by General der Infanterie Bruno Bieler
