= Alfred Edwin McKay =

Canadian flying ace

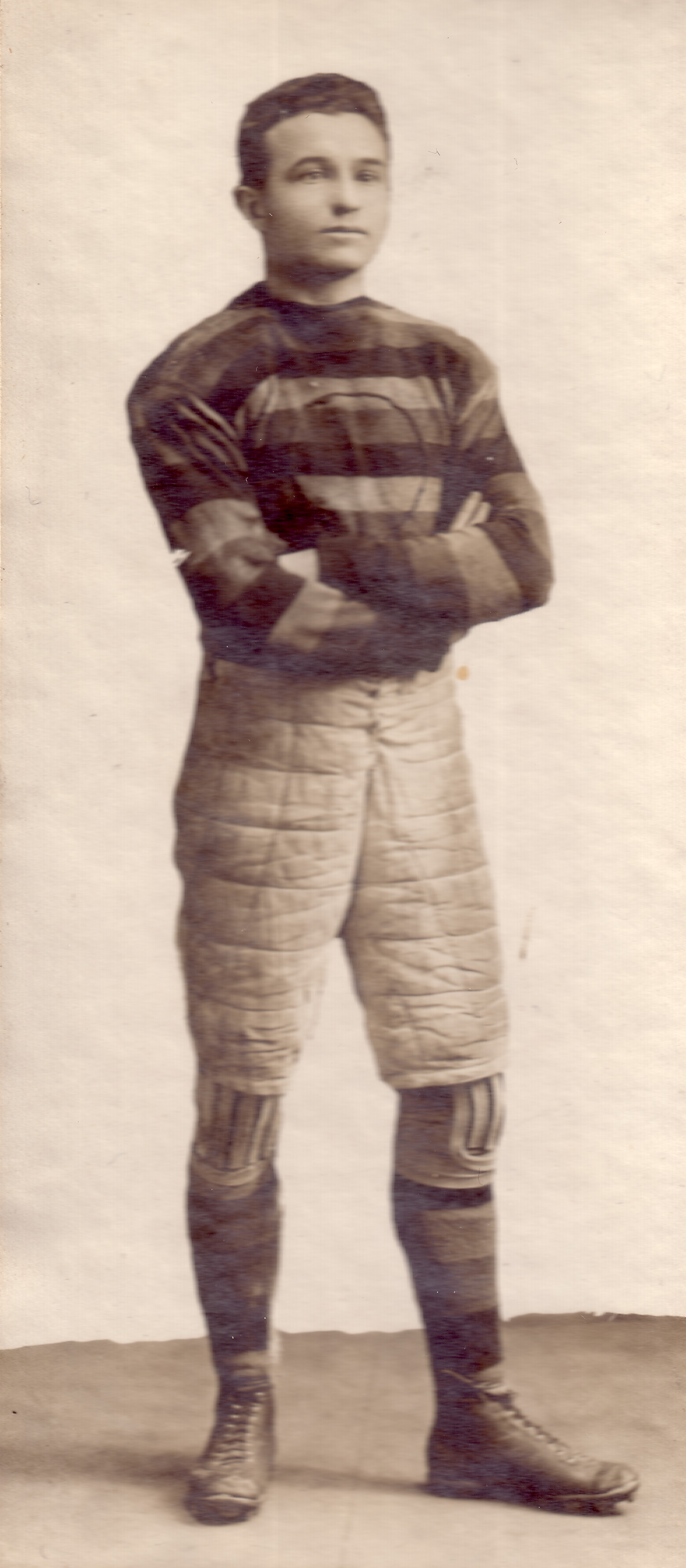
- McKay in 1915
- Born: 27 December 1892; Brussels, Ontario, Canada
- Died: 28 December 1917 (aged 25)
- Military career
- Allegiance: Canada / United Kingdom
- Branch: Royal Flying Corps
- Service years: 1916–1917
- Rank: Captain
- Nickname: Eddie
- Units: 24 Squadron; 23 Squadron
- Awards: Military Cross

Captain Alfred Edwin "Eddie" McKay MC (27 December 1892 – 28 December 1917) was a Canadian flying ace who flew with the Royal Flying Corps during the First World War.

== Civilian life ==
The son of William and Mary McKay, he was born on 27 December 1892 in Brussels, Ontario, Canada. He later moved to London, Ontario to enroll in a Faculty of Arts program at the University of Western Ontario. Once there, McKay excelled in varsity athletics. In particular, his speed was often cited by a student newspaper – The Western University Gazette – as a reason for the success of Western's 1915 Canadian Junior Championship rugby team.

== Involvement in the First World War ==
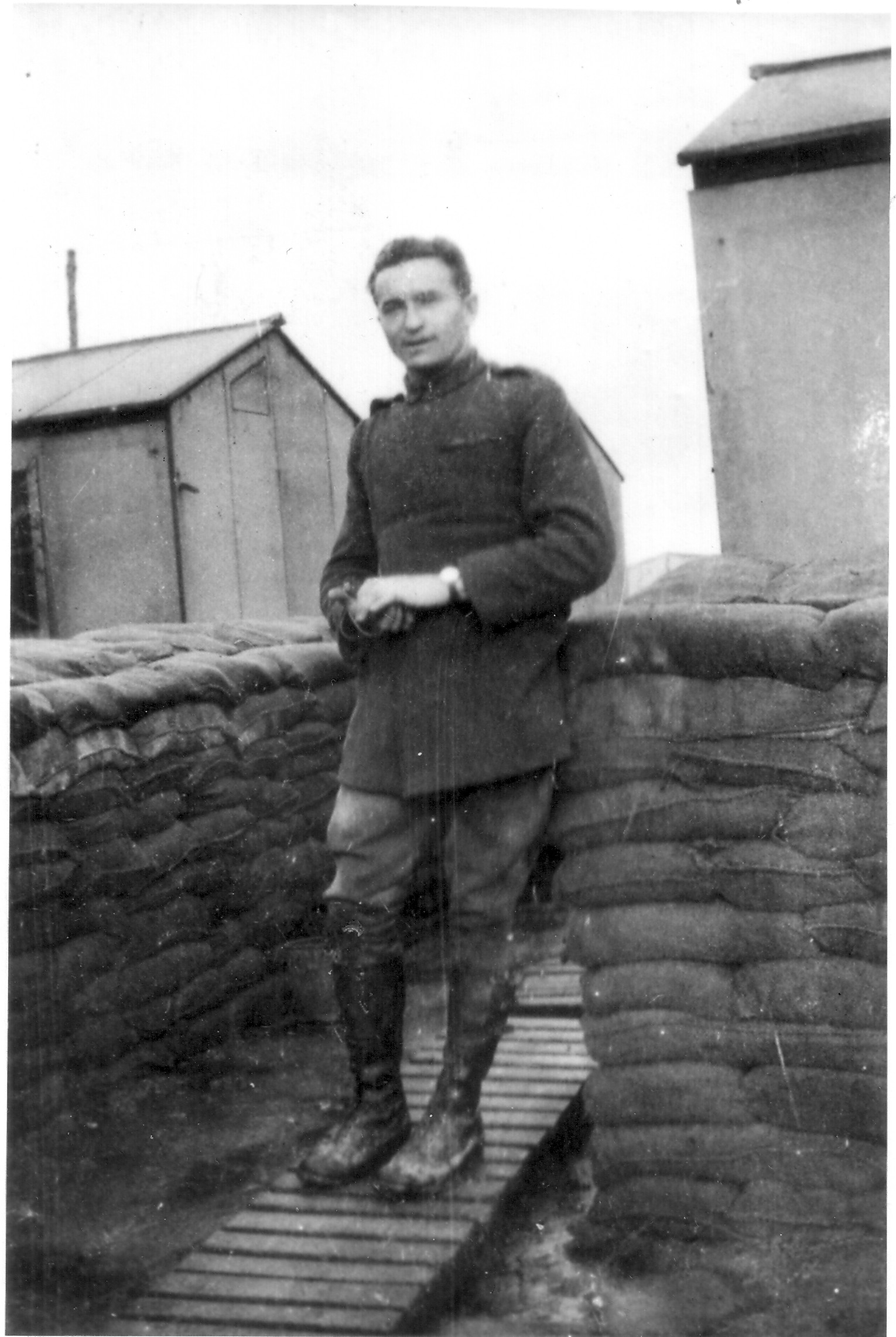
McKay in Royal Flying Corps uniform, December 1917

Around March 1916, McKay completed his training at the Wright Aviation School in Augusta, Georgia, and shipped off to Europe as a member of the Royal Flying Corps. An editorial that appeared in The Western University Gazette in the same month, described Eddie was as a "careful" flyer who was one of the best pilots ever produced at Wright. He was assigned to 24 Squadron where he flew an Airco D.H.2 and recorded four victories between 20 July 1916 and 25 January 1917. For his efforts, McKay was promoted to captain and transferred to train new pilots. Later that year, he cited boredom when he requested to be moved back into a combat role. Subsequently, McKay was reassigned to 23 Squadron flying the French made Spad S. VII. He earned his final six victories (bringing his total to ten) within a one-month period stretching from 19 November 1917 to 18 December 1917. During a 26 October dogfight, McKay was pursued by German ace Manfred von Richthofen when they disrupted Oswald Boelcke and Erwin Bohme's attack on Alfred Gerald Knight. McKay and Knight confirmed that Boelcke collided with Bohme during the assault. On 28 December 1917, McKay was shot down over Belgium. Jasta 2's Leutnant Carl Menckhoff was credited with the victory, although a German 2-seater also claimed a SPAD at this time and place. In Above the Trenches, Christopher Shores suggests that McKay became a prisoner of war after being shot down, but Veteran Affairs Canada lists the 28th as the day he was killed in action.

== Eddie McKay in public memory ==
McKay has been commemorated on page 579 of the First World War Book of Remembrance and on the Arras Memorial in the Faubourg-d'Amiens Cemetery, Arras. In 1920, a local citizen named William Haddon donated the Eddie McKay Cup to the Public School Hockey League in London, Ontario. The cup was meant to be in honor of McKay's "athletic manhood and enthusiasm for sport". In November 2007 a fourth year history class at King's University College placed a commemorative marker in McKay's memory on the University of Western Ontario campus.

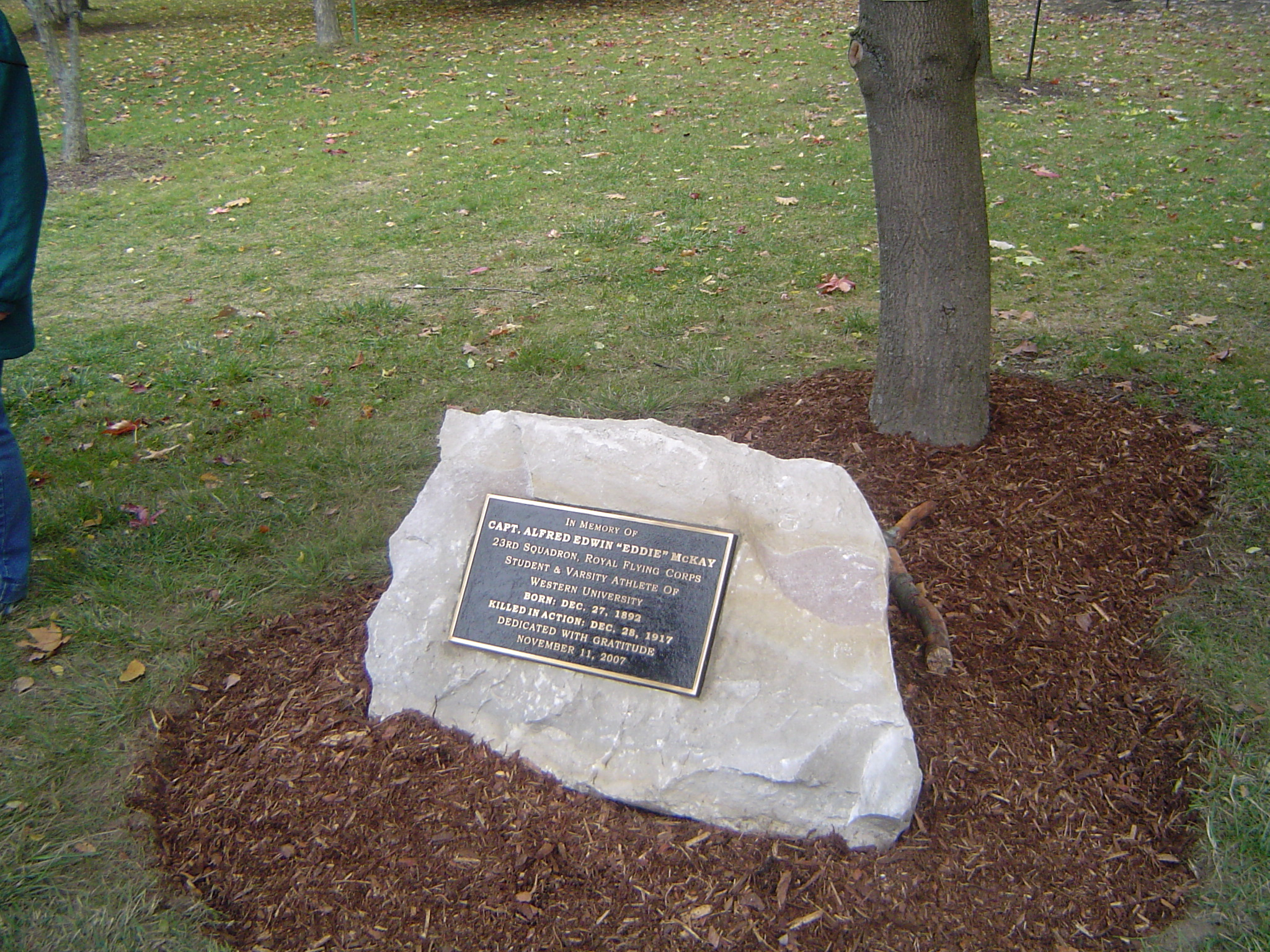
Eddie McKay commemorative marker at the University of Western Ontario

== See also ==
- World War I Flying Aces
- List of World War I flying aces by nationality
