= Clive Wilson Warman =

American World War I flying ace

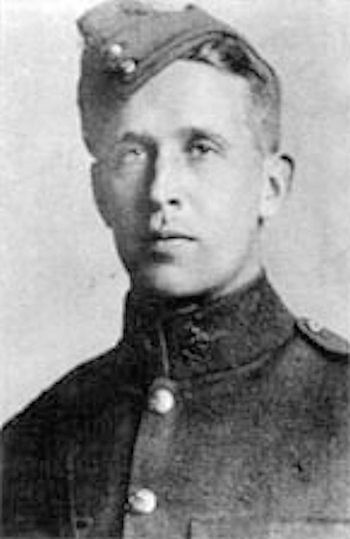
- Clive Wilson Warman, 1918
- Born: 30 May 1892; Norfolk, Virginia, US
- Died: 12 May 1919 (aged 26); London, England
- Burial place: Brookwood Military Cemetery Brookwood, England
- Military career
- Allegiance: United States
- Branch: Royal Air Force (United Kingdom)
- Rank: Captain
- Unit: Royal Air Force: No, 23 Squadron RFC
- Conflicts: World War I
- Awards: British Distinguished Service Order, Military Cross

Captain Clive Wilson Warman (30 May 1892 – 12 May 1919) was a World War I flying ace credited with twelve aerial victories. He was the sole American winner of the British Distinguished Service Order.

== Early life ==
Clive Wilson Warman was born on 30 May 1892 in Norfolk, Virginia.

== World War I ==
Warman was a civil engineer before World War I. He enlisted in the Princess Patricia's Canadian Light Infantry in Canada on 5 September 1914. They sailed for England in January 1915. Warman's duty with them took him through the Second Battle of Ypres, where he was wounded. After recovery, he was involved in suppressing the Easter Rebellion in Ireland. He then transferred to the Royal Flying Corps in summer 1916. He was so skillful that when he finished pilot training, they temporarily retained him as an instructor. Not until June 1917 was he assigned to a combat squadron, No. 23, to fly a Spad VII. He began his victory string on 6 July 1917. He became a balloon buster and an ace on 9 August 1917, when he destroyed a German observation balloon. He scored double victories on 12 and 15 August. On 16 August, his guns jammed mid-fight with three Germans; in frustration, Warman fired his Very flares at his German opponents; he finally flung a wooden mallet at them. Despite his gun jams, he destroyed a German two-seater and a second observation balloon that day. Two days later, he scored his final win. His final tally was two observation balloons destroyed, two enemy planes driven down out of control, and eight destroyed; one of the latter was shared with Conn Standish O'Grady.

On 22 August 1917, Warman was forced down and wounded in combat. He was under medical care until mid-1918; subsequently, he was assigned to the War Ministry in London for the rest of the war.

== Postwar ==
Postwar, he became a flight commander in the new No. 1 Canadian Squadron. He was injured in a crash on 8 May 1919, and died of his wounds on 12 May 1919.

== Honors and awards ==
Distinguished Service Order (DSO)

2nd Lt. Clive Wilson Warman, M.C., Gen. List and R.F.C.

He was awarded for conspicuous gallantry and devotion to duty. Over two days, despite strong winds and intense enemy opposition, he destroyed three enemy aircraft and a balloon. He also attacked an enemy aerodrome. On one occasion, after becoming separated from his patrol and surrounded by 20 enemy aircraft, he fought his way through using a Very pistol after his machine gun became unusable. He returned to his aerodrome with his aircraft heavily damaged. The citation praised his composure and courage.

Military Cross (MC)

T./2nd Lt. Clive Wilson Warman, Gen. List and R.F.C.

He was awarded for conspicuous gallantry and devotion to duty. Over a period of six weeks, he shot down six enemy aircraft and destroyed an enemy balloon. He also forced at least five other enemy aircraft down, demonstrating a willingness to engage at close range.

== See also ==
- List of World War I flying aces from the United States

== Bibliography ==
- American Aces of World War 1 Harry Dempsey. Osprey Publishing, 2001. ISBN 1-84176-375-6, ISBN 978-1-84176-375-0.
- Franks, Norman L. R.; Bailey, Frank W. (1992). Over the front : a complete record of the fighter aces and units of the United States and French Air Services, 1914-1918. London: Grub Street. ISBN 978-0-948817-54-0.ISBN 0-948817-54-2
