= Günther Rüdel =

German general (1883–1950)

- Born: 15 November 1883; Metz, Alsace-Lorraine
- Died: 22 April 1950 (aged 66); Munich, West Germany
- Burial place: Munich Waldfriedhof; Field 16—W 38
- Military career
- Allegiance: German Empire; Weimar Republic; Nazi Germany
- Branch: Luftwaffe
- Service years: 1902–1945
- Rank: Generaloberst
- Commands: Luftverteidigung und Inspekteur des Luftschutzes
- Conflicts: World War I World War II
- Awards: Eisernes Kreuz 1914

Günther Rüdel (15 November 1883 – 22 April 1950) was a German general in the Luftwaffe during World War II.

== Biography ==
Günther Rüdel was born in Metz, in Alsace-Lorraine, on 15 November 1883. Rüdel served as a captain during World War I, working for the Ministry of War. Günther Rüdel made a brilliant military career in the Reichswehr, then in the Luftwaffe. He attained the grade of Generalleutnant in April 1936, and General der Flakartillerie in October 1937. Rüdel was assigned "Inspekteur der Flakartillerie" from 1938 to 1942. During the Second World War, Günther Rüdel attained the grade of Generaloberst in November 1942.

Rüdel stood up to Adolf Hitler in the Beer Hall Putsch, the failed 1923 coup d'état against the Weimar Republic government, stopping him from shooting an official with his pistol. His grandson, John Crane, a civilian US military executive in charge of its whistleblower protection unit, himself became a whistleblower in 2013.

== Dates of ranks ==
- Fähnrich : 5 July 1902
- Leutnant : March 1904
- Oberleutnant : March 1912
- Hauptmann : 9 August 1915
- Major : 1 December 1923
- Oberstleutnant : 1 February 1929
- Oberst : 1 October 1934
- Generalleutnant : 1 April 1936 ;
- General der Flakartillerie : 1 October 1937
- Generaloberst : 1 November 1942

== Medals and decorations ==
- Iron Cross of 1914, 1st and 2nd class
- Knight's Cross of the Royal House Order of Hohenzollern with Swords
- Military Merit Order (Bavaria), 4th class with Swords
- Hanseatic Cross of Hamburg
- Wilhelm Ernst War Cross
- Order of the Iron Crown, 3rd class with War Decoration (Austria)
- Military Merit Cross, 3rd class with War Decoration (Austria-Hungary)
- Honour Cross of the World War 1914/1918
- Wehrmacht Long Service Award, 4th with 1st class
- War Merit Cross (1939), 1st and 2nd class with Swords
- Knights Cross of the War Merit Cross with swords
- Anti-Aircraft Flak Battle Badge
