= Château du Sart =

Château in Hauts-de-France, France

Coordinates: 50°39′24″N 3°7′55″E

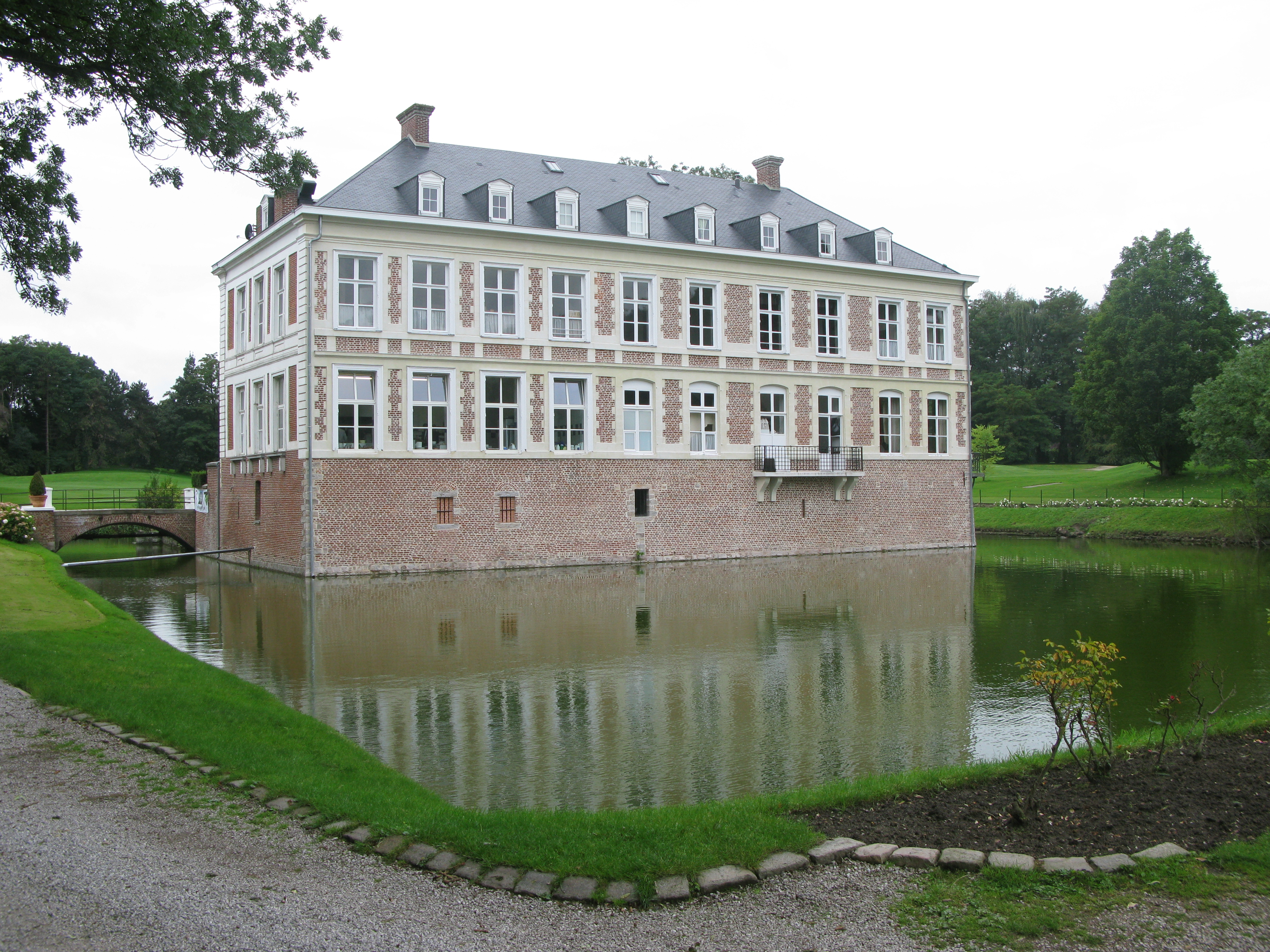
Southern side of the château

The Château du Sart is a château in the Sart-Babylone quarter of Villeneuve d'Ascq, the Nord department of France.

== History ==
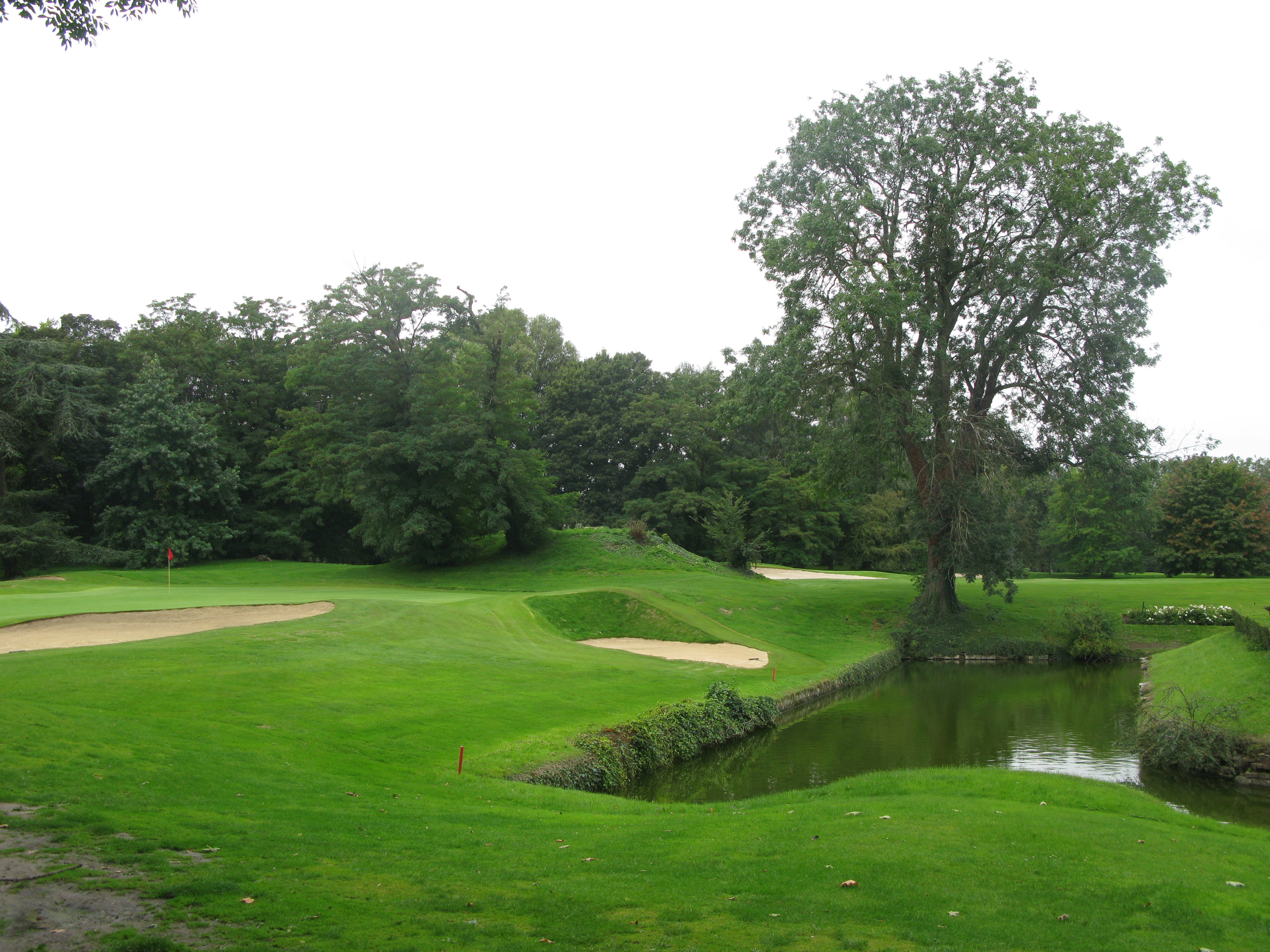
Golf field in the park

The château was built in 1740. It was rarely occupied by its owners, the Seigneurs of Fourmestraux.

The park was transformed into an 18-hole golf course, and nowadays, the château has become the course club house.

== Collections ==
The château had the rich Van Der Cruisse de Waziers library, which was destroyed by the Germans during the First World War.

In the farmyard of the old farm, near the château, is a pigeon house which was designed following the model of Diderot et d’Alembert in their Encyclopédie.

== Gallery ==
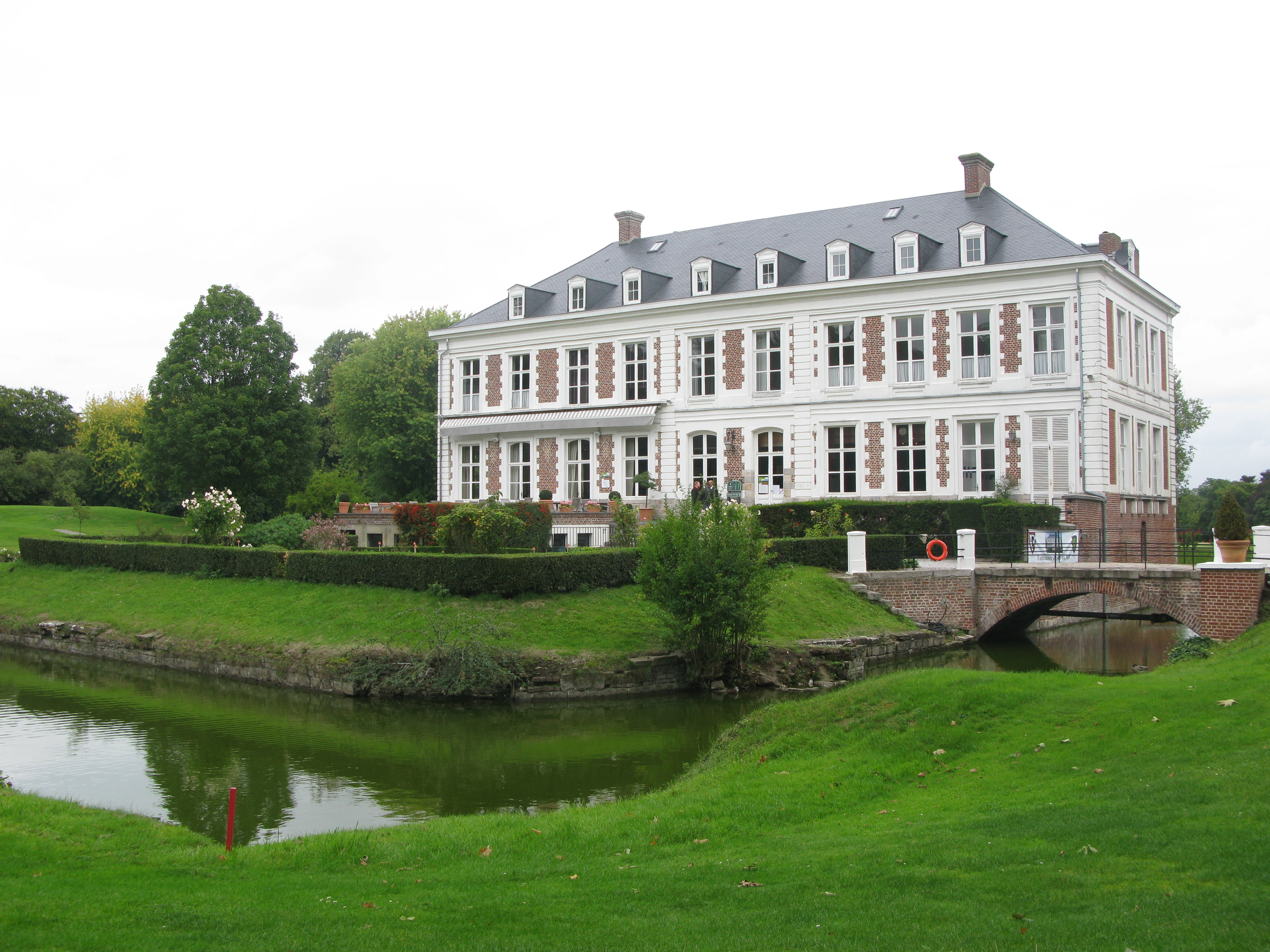
Northern side

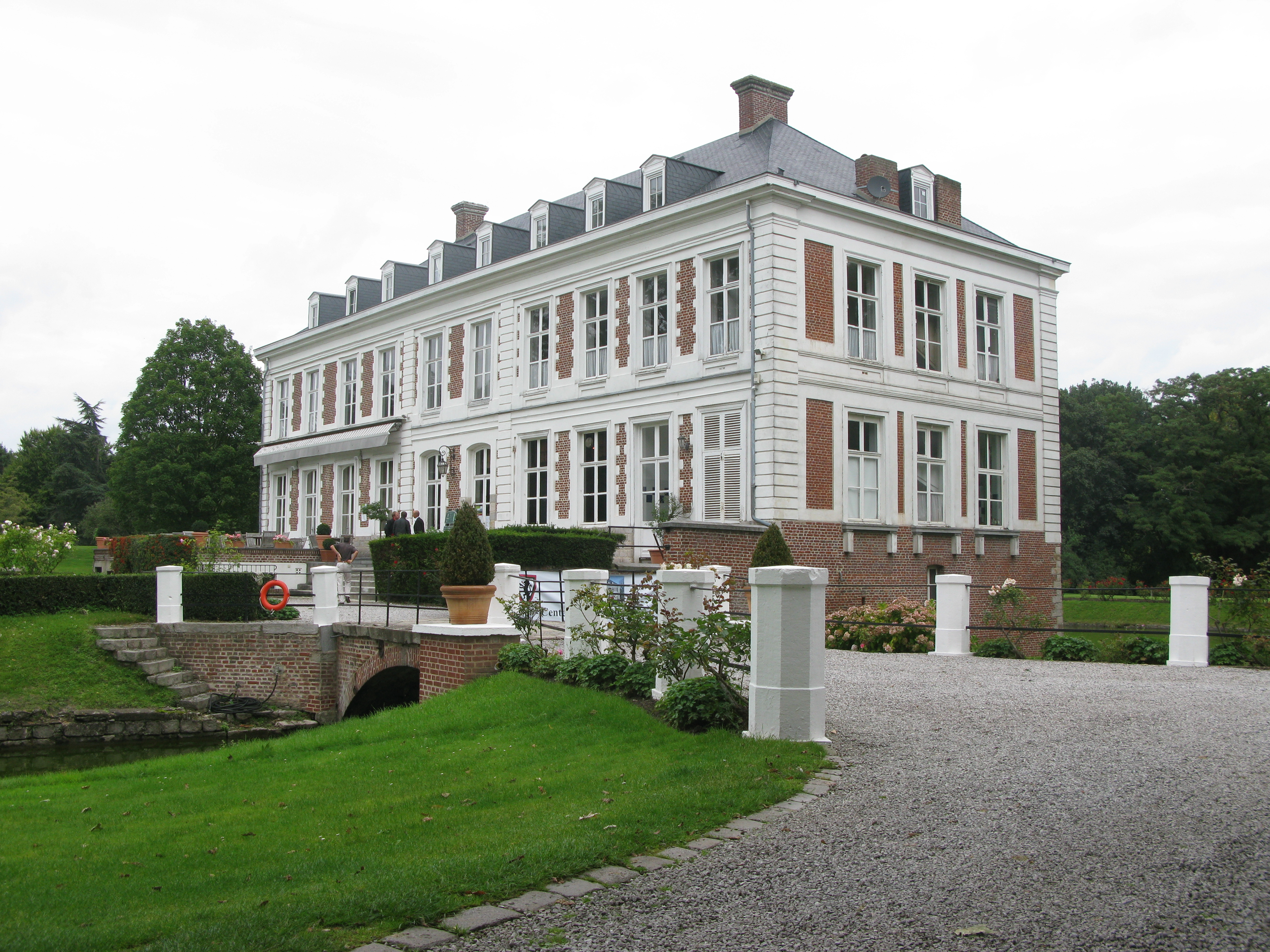
Northern and eastern side
