= Oliver Bryson =

Royal Air Force officer (1896–1977)

Oliver Campbell Bryson
- Born: 18 August 1896; Barnt Green, Worcestershire, England
- Died: 27 March 1977 (aged 80); Surrey, England
- Military career
- Allegiance: United Kingdom
- Branch: British Army (1914–18); Royal Air Force (1918–43)
- Service years: 1914–1943
- Rank: Group Captain
- Units: Queen's Own Dorset Yeomanry; No. 19 Squadron
- Conflicts: First World War; Russian Civil War; North–West Frontier; Second World War
- Awards: George Cross; Military Cross; Distinguished Flying Cross & Bar; Mentioned in Despatches

Oliver Campbell Bryson GC, MC, DFC & Bar (18 August 1896 – 27 March 1977) was a Royal Air Force officer who served in both World Wars. He was a flying ace credited with 12 aerial victories during the First World War.

== Early life and education ==
Bryson was born in Lickey, a village in the Bromsgrove district of Worcestershire in England, the son of George and Edith Bryson. His father was a hardware merchant. In the 1911 Census of Uppingham in Rutland he is listed as a student at the Uppingham School.

== First World War service ==
Bryson was educated at Bromsgrove School, and joined the Queen's Own Dorset Yeomanry in 1914. Shortly thereafter, he was wounded in action. While serving in Egypt, he transferred to the Royal Flying Corps. On 15 March 1917, after a flaming crash, he rescued his fellow aircrew member. In July 1917, he was posted to fly a SPAD for 19 Squadron in France. His first aerial victory followed shortly; he drove down a German observation plane down out of control on 25 August. By the end of the year, Bryson's victory total had increased to 11.

In January 1918, the King presented him with the Albert Medal for his heroism in rescuing his fellow airman following a crash at Wye Aerodrome. On 8 March, having upgraded to a Sopwith Dolphin fighter plane, Bryson scored his final victory of the war, destroying a German Albatros D.V over Gheluvelt, Belgium. His final summary showed he had destroyed four enemy aircraft; two of these were shared victories, including one with Arthur Bradfield Fairclough. Bryson's other eight wins were of the out of control variety; three of them were shared with such other aces as Albert Desbrisay Carter.

== Interbellum and later career ==
Oliver Bryson was one of the British aviators ordered to Russia in 1919 to support the White Army in its counter-revolution against the Bolsheviks. He commanded a bomber squadron, and also flew operations in a Snipe. His gallantry earned him a Distinguished Flying Cross. Bryson was also granted a permanent commission as flight lieutenant, effective 1 August 1919.

Bryson was stationed in India from 1928 to 1931; he won a Bar to his Distinguished Flying Cross for his efforts.

In 1933, Bryson was assigned to the Central Flying School and put in charge of engines. He also was promoted to Squadron Leader.

On 1 November 1938, Bryson was promoted from wing commander to group captain.

Oliver Campbell Bryson retired from the Royal Air Force in 1943, having served for almost three decades.

== Honours and awards ==
Award proclamation for the Albert Medal for lifesaving:

The KING was pleased, at Buckingham Palace, on Wednesday, the 9th instant, to present to Captain Oliver Campbell Bryson, Flight Commander, Royal Flying Corps, the Albert Medal, which was awarded by His Majesty in recognition of his gallantry in endeavouring to save life in March last. The circumstances are as follows: —
On 15 March 1917, Captain (then Lieutenant) Bryson, with Second Lieutenant Hillebrandt as passenger, was piloting an aeroplane at Wye Aerodrome when, owing to a sideslip, the machine crashed to the ground and burst into flames. On disentangling himself from the burning wreckage Captain Bryson at once went back into the flames, dragged Lieutenant Hillebrandt from the machine, and notwithstanding his own injuries, which were undoubtedly aggravated by his gallant efforts to rescue his brother officer from the fire, endeavoured to extinguish the fire on Lieutenant Hillebrandt's clothing. Lieutenant Hillebrandt succumbed to his injuries a few; days later.

Citation accompanying award of the Military Cross:

For conspicuous gallantry and devotion to duty. He made several difficult flights in most unfavourable weather, and destroyed several hostile machines. He proved himself a determined and undaunted leader, and set a splendid example of courage on all occasions.

Citation accompanying award of the Distinguished Flying Cross:

Has commanded a Squadron of heavy bombing machines in North Russia during the whole of the summer of 1919, during which period he carried out a large number of successful raids on the enemy's territory. During the operations on the Northern Dvina in August, and on the Pinega in September, 1919, he flew a Snipe machine with exceptional skill and daring. A very gallant officer he has proved himself during these exceptionally difficult aerial operations.

Bryson also won a Bar to the Distinguished Flying Cross. It was granted for his service on the North–West Frontier of India in 1930.

== Bibliography ==
- Shores, Christopher F.; Franks, Norman; Guest, Russell (1990). Above the Trenches: A Complete Record of the Fighter Aces and Units of the British Empire Air Forces 1915–1920. London, UK: Grub Street. ISBN 0-948817-19-4.
