= Wilhelm Ernst War Cross =

Wilhelm Ernst War Cross Wilhelm-Ernst-Kriegskreuz
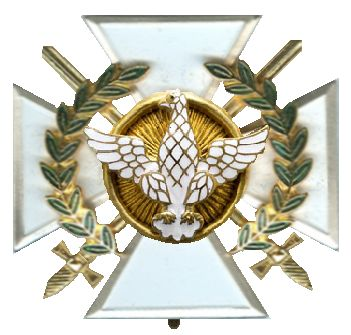
- Wilhelm Ernst War Cross
- Type: Military decoration
- Presented by: Grand Duchy of Saxe-Weimar-Eisenach
- Established: 10 June 1915

Highlights
- Total: 366

The Wilhelm Ernst War Cross (German: Wilhelm-Ernst-Kriegskreuz) was a military decoration of the Grand Duchy of Saxe-Weimar-Eisenach. Established by William Ernest, Grand Duke of Saxe-Weimar-Eisenach on 10 June 1915, it was awarded to recognize military valor during World War I. Individuals awarded the Wilhelm Ernst War Cross had to be recipients of the Iron Cross, 1st class, and were members of 5 Thüringischen Infanterie-Regiment Nr. 94 also known as the Grand Duke of Saxony's Regiment. The cross was also to be awarded to citizens of the grand duchy serving in other units.

== Recipients ==
- Hans von Boineburg-Lengsfeld
- Otto-Wilhelm Förster
- Alexander von Hartmann
- Walter von Hippel
- Otto von Knobelsdorff
- Paul Laux
- Günther Rüdel
