= Arthur Bradfield Fairclough =

- Born: 25 July 1896; Toronto, Ontario, Canada
- Died: 9 December 1968 (aged 72)
- Military career
- Allegiance: Dominion of Canada; United Kingdom
- Branch: Canadian Expeditionary Force; British Army; Royal Air Force
- Rank: Captain
- Units: The Queen's Own Rifles of Canada; Canadian Machine Gun Corps; No. 49 (Training) Squadron RFC; No. 19 Squadron RFC/RAF; No. 23 Squadron RAF; School of Special Flying, RAF Canada
- Conflicts: First World War
- Awards: Military Cross

Arthur Bradfield Fairclough MC (25 July 1896 – 9 December 1968) was a Canadian First World War flying ace, officially credited with 19 aerial victories.

== Early life and background ==
Fairclough was born in Toronto, the son of Leonard and Ettie (née Carter) Fairclough, and before the war worked as a clerk for the financiers Wood Gundy.

== Military service ==
On 7 February 1916 Fairclough was commissioned as a lieutenant in the 2nd Regiment, Queen's Own Rifles of Canada. On 24 May he volunteered for overseas service, and was assigned to the 166th Battalion, Canadian Expeditionary Force. He sailed for England on 26 September, and on 6 October was placed on the General List, assigned to the Canadian Machine Gun Corps, and posted to the Canadian Training Depot. After completing his training at the Canadian Machine Gun School on 23 December, he was posted to the Canadian Machine Gun Depot on 31 January 1917.

Fairclough then elected to serve in the Royal Flying Corps. His training began at the No 1 School of Military Aeronautics, in Reading, Berkshire, on 16 February 1917, and he was posted to No. 2 Reserve Squadron on 27 March for basic flight training. He was granted Royal Aero Club Aviators' Certificate No. 4597 on 24 April, and was posted to No. 42 Reserve Squadron on 30 April to complete his training. He was seconded to the Royal Flying Corps on 22 May, and appointed a flying officer the following day. He was posted to No. 49 Squadron, then a training unit, serving as an instructor there from 28 August, and also briefly served in No. 40 and No. 56 Training Squadrons in October and November. Fairclough was sent to France on 15 November, posted to No. 1 Aeroplane Supply Depot at Saint-Omer, then posted to No. 19 Squadron on 18 November to fly the SPAD S.VII single-seat fighter aircraft.

Fairclough gained his first aerial victory in a SPAD on 6 December 1917, scoring steadily throughout the month, and had nine victories to his credit by the end of the year. His squadron converted to the Sopwith Dolphin in January 1918, and he scored five more victories between 17 March and 2 May, by which time the Army's Royal Flying Corps (RFC) and the Royal Naval Air Service (RNAS) had been merged to form the Royal Air Force.

He was awarded the Military Cross, which was gazetted on 10 May 1918. His citation read:

Lt. Arthur Bradfield Fairclough, Can. M.G. Co. and R.F.C.

"For conspicuous gallantry and devotion to duty. During four months he has destroyed four enemy machines, and has driven down two others completely out of control. When engaged with hostile aircraft he has at all times displayed the utmost dash and courage."

Fairclough was transferred to No. 23 Squadron RAF on 4 May and appointed a flight commander with the temporary rank of captain. Between 29 June and 5 July he gained five more victories, to bring his total to nineteen. He was returned to the Home Establishment on 8 July, and was posted to back to Canada on 11 July. On 13 September he was assigned to RAF Canada's School of Special Flying (No. 43 Wing) at Armour Heights, where he was appointed an Examining Officer on 21 October, to train flying instructors.

On 14 April 1919 Lieutenant (Honorary Captain) Fairclough relinquished his Royal Air Force commission on ceasing to be employed. and the following day was struck off the strength of the Canadian Expeditionary Force.

== List of aerial victories ==
Combat record
No.	Date/time	Aircraft/ Serial No.	Opponent	Result	Location	Notes
No. 19 Squadron RFC/RAF
1	6 December 1917 @ 15:42	SPAD S.VII (A6836)	C	Driven down 'out of control'	East of Roeselare	Shared with Captain Oliver Bryson, Lieutenant R. G. Holt & Second Lieutenant Eric Olivier.
2	8 December 1917 @ 13:35	SPAD S.VII (B3528)	Rumpler C	Driven down 'out of control'	Tenbreilen-Wervik	Shared with Captains Oliver Bryson & G. W. Taylor.
3	18 December 1917 @ 10:35	SPAD S.VII (B3528)	C	Driven down 'out of control'	Comines	Shared with Captain Oliver Bryson.
4	18 December 1917 @ 12:50	SPAD S.VII (A6795)	Albatros D.V	Destroyed	Gheluvelt	
5	19 December 1917 @ 08:05	SPAD S.VII (A6805)	C	Driven down 'out of control'	East of Hooglede	
6	19 December 1917 @ 11:30	SPAD S.VII (B3528)	C	Destroyed	West of Passchendaele	Shared with Captain Oliver Bryson.
7	22 December 1917 @ 14:20	SPAD S.VII (A6802)	Albatros D.III	Destroyed in flames	South of Le Quesnoy	Shared with Major Albert D. Carter, Captains Oliver Bryson & G. W. Taylor, Lieutenants E. J. Blyth & H. E. Galer, and Second Lieutenant Eric Olivier.
8	29 December 1917 @ 10:10	SPAD S.VII (A6802)	Albatros D.V	Driven down 'out of control'	Houthulst Forest	
9	29 December 1917 @ 10:15	SPAD S.VII (A6802)	Albatros D.V	Destroyed in flames	Houthulst Forest	
10	17 March 1918 @ 12:15	Sopwith Dolphin (C3940)	Albatros D.V	Destroyed in flames	North East of Menen	Shared with Second Lieutenant Eric Olivier.
11	23 March 1918 @ 15:40	Sopwith Dolphin (C3940)	C	Destroyed in flames	East of Lille	Shared with Captain John Leacroft.
12	22 April 1918 @ 10:30	Sopwith Dolphin (C3796)	Albatros D.V	Driven down 'out of control'	Bois du Biez	
13	23 April 1918 @ 18:20	Sopwith Dolphin (C3796)	Pfalz D.III	Driven down 'out of control'	North of La Bassée	
14	2 May 1918 @ 17:45	Sopwith Dolphin (C3796)	Albatros D.V	Destroyed in flames	South of Armentières	Shared with Lieutenant Arthur Blake.
No. 23 Squadron RAF
15	29 June 1918 @ 10:30	Sopwith Dolphin (C8070)	Fokker D.VII	Destroyed in flames	Hangard	Shared with Lieutenants A. P. Pehrson, C. C. A. Sherwood, Harold A. White, Bentley, Adam and MacPherson.
16	29 June 1918 @ 18:30	Sopwith Dolphin (C8070)	Fokker D.VII	Driven down 'out of control'	Hangard	
17	1 July 1918 @ 20:40	Sopwith Dolphin (D3669)	Albatros D.V	Destroyed	Hangest	
18	4 July 1918 @ 10:20	Sopwith Dolphin (C8074)	Pfalz D.III	Destroyed	Hamel	
19	5 July 1918 @ 10:30	Sopwith Dolphin (D3669)	Rumpler C	Destroyed in flames	South East of Mézières	Shared with Lieutenant A. B. Sinclair.
