= James William Pearson =

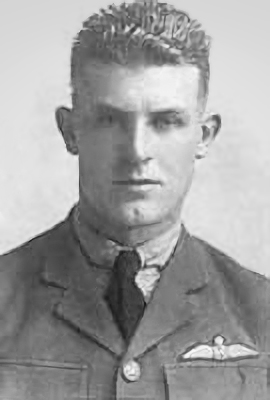
- James William Pearson, 1918
- Born: April 2, 1895; Bridgeport, Connecticut, USA
- Died: January 26, 1993 (aged 97); Montclair, New Jersey, USA
- Military career
- Allegiance: United States
- Branch: Royal Air Force (United Kingdom)
- Rank: Captain
- Unit: Royal Air Force: No. 23 Squadron RAF
- Conflicts: World War I
- Awards: British Distinguished Flying Cross, French Croix de Guerre
- Other work: Longest surviving American ace of World War I

Captain James William Pearson was an American World War I flying ace credited with twelve aerial victories while flying for the British Royal Air Force.

== Early life ==
Pearson's home town was Nutley, New Jersey, despite being born in Connecticut.

== World War I ==
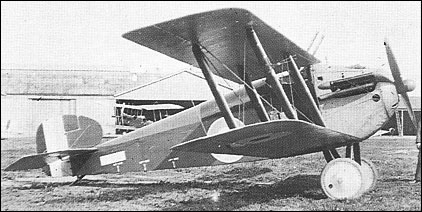
A Sopwith Dolphin.

Pearson was promoted to 2nd lieutenant (temporarily) in October 1917.

He was assigned to No. 23 Squadron RFC at Bertangles, which originally operated Spads. They later re-equipped with Sopwith Dolphins, and Pearson began to score confirmed victories of enemy aircraft. Between 30 May and 1 November 1918, he destroyed six enemy planes (one of which was a joint victory with Harry Compton) and drove six others down out of control.

== Aerial victories ==
No.	Date/time	Foe	Result	Location	Notes
1	30 May 1918 @ 1045 hours	Albatros reconnaissance plane	Driven down out of control	South of Albert	Victory shared with another pilot
2	3 June 1918 @ 1740 hours	Pfalz D.III fighter	Set afire and destroyed	Montdidier	
3	1 July 1918 @ 1135 hours	Albatros D.V fighter	Destroyed	Hangest	
4	1 July 1918 @ 1140 hours	Albatros D.V fighter	Driven down out of control	Hangest	
5	1 August 1918 @ 0720 hours	Halberstadt reconnaissance plane	Set afire and destroyed	Caix-Harbionnieres	
6	1 August 1918 @ 0740 hours	Pfalz D.III fighter	Driven down out of control	Warfusée	
7	18 September 1918 @ 1215 hours	Fokker D.VII fighter	Set afire and destroyed	Lihaucourt	
8	18 September 1918 @ 1215 hours	Fokker D.VII fighter	Driven down out of control	Lihaucourt	
9	28 October 1918 @ 1130 hours	Fokker D.VII fighter	Driven down out of control	Bois de Nouvion	
10	28 October 1918 @ 1130 hours	Fokker D.VII fighter	Destroyed	Bois de Nouvion	
11	29 October 1918 @ 1300 hours	Halberstadt reconnaissance plane	Driven down out of control	Northeast of Landrecis	
12	1 November 1918 @ 1210 hours	DFW reconnaissance plane	Destroyed	Petit Bart	Victory shared with Harry Compton and another pilot

== Postwar ==
Pearson founded the J. W. Pearson Textile Company, from which he retired in 1960. Upon his death in 1993, it was realized that Pearson was the last surviving American ace from World War I.

== Honors and awards ==
Distinguished Flying Cross (DFC)

Lieut. (A./Capt.) James William Pearson. (FRANCE)

On 26 October, while leading a patrol, this officer observed a formation of enemy scouts. Diving to the attack, he engaged one and drove it down out of control. He then attacked a second, which he drove down to crash. In all he has accounted for seven enemy aircraft, setting at all times a fine example of skill and courageous determination.

== See also ==
- List of World War I flying aces from the United States

== Bibliography ==
- American Aces of World War 1 Harry Dempsey. Osprey Publishing, 2001. ISBN 1-84176-375-6, ISBN 978-1-84176-375-0.
- Over the Front: A Complete Record of the Fighter Aces and Units of the United States and French Air Services, 1914–1918 Norman L. R. Franks, Frank W. Bailey. Grub Street, 1992. ISBN 0-948817-54-2, ISBN 978-0-948817-54-0.
