= No. 23 Squadron RAF =

Defunct flying squadron of the Royal Air Force

- Squadron badge
- Active: 1915–1918 (RFC); 1918–1919; 1925–1945; 1946–1975; 1975–1988; 1988–2009
- Disbanded: 2 October 2009
- Country: United Kingdom
- Branch: Royal Air Force
- Motto: Semper Aggressus (Latin for 'Always on the attack')

Insignia
- Post-1950 roundel
- Tail codes: MS (Sep 1938–Sep 1939); YP (Sep 1939–May 1945 and Sep 1946–April 1951); EA–EZ (Nov 1988 – Feb 1994)

No. 23 Squadron is a dormant squadron of the Royal Air Force. Prior to its disbandment in October 2009, it operated the Boeing E-3D Sentry AEW1 aircraft from RAF Waddington, Lincolnshire.

== History ==
=== First World War (1915–1919) ===
No. 23 Squadron of the Royal Flying Corps was formed at Fort Grange, Gosport on 1 September 1915, commanded by Louis Strange and equipped with a mixture of aircraft types. A detachment operating the Royal Aircraft Factory B.E.2c was deployed to Sutton's Farm airfield to act as night fighters to oppose raids by German Zeppelin airships, but there were no successful interceptions. The squadron moved to France on 16 March 1916 flying the Royal Aircraft Factory F.E.2b two-seat pusher fighter. The squadron used the F.E.2b on close-escort duties and to fly standing patrols to engage hostile aircraft wherever they could be found, helping to establish air superiority in the build-up to the Battle of the Somme.

By the end of the year the F.E.2b was obsolete, and the squadron started to receive Spad S.VII single-seat fighters in February 1917, with its last F.E.2 withdrawn in April 1917. The squadron flew its SPADs both on offensive fighter patrols over the frontline and low-level strafing attacks against German troops. In December 1917, it replaced its SPAD S.VII with the more powerful and heavier armed Spad S.XIII.

Charles Kingsford Smith, Australian Aviation pioneer was assigned to the squadron in July 1917. During his time at the squadron he shot down four German fighters before being shot down himself, he would go on to hold a training role within the squadron.

The squadron converted to Sopwith Dolphins in April 1918 until it disbanded just after the war on 31 December 1919.

It numbered nineteen flying aces among its ranks during the war, including: William Kennedy-Cochran-Patrick; Douglas U. McGregor; James Pearson; Clive W. Warman; Frederick Gibbs; Conn Standish O'Grady; Herbert Drewitt; James Fitz-Morris; Harold Albert White; Alfred Edwin McKay; Harry Compton; and Arthur Bradfield Fairclough.

=== Interwar period (1925–1938) ===
No. 23 Squadron was re-formed on 1 July 1925 at RAF Henlow in Bedfordshire, flying the Sopwith Snipe, under command of the First World War air ace Raymond Collishaw. The squadron re-equipped with the more modern Gloster Gamecock fighter in May 1926, and moved to RAF Kenley in Surrey in February 1927.

In April 1931, the squadron partly re-equipped with Bristol Bulldogs, another single seat fighter, while continuing to operate the Gamecock. Both the Gamecock and Bulldog were outperformed by the Hawker Hart light bomber which had recently entered service with the RAF, and in June 1931, the squadron received a single Hart for evaluation as a two seat fighter. The evaluation was a success, and a flight of six fighter variants of the Hart, designated the Hart Fighter replaced the squadrons remaining Gamecocks from October that year.

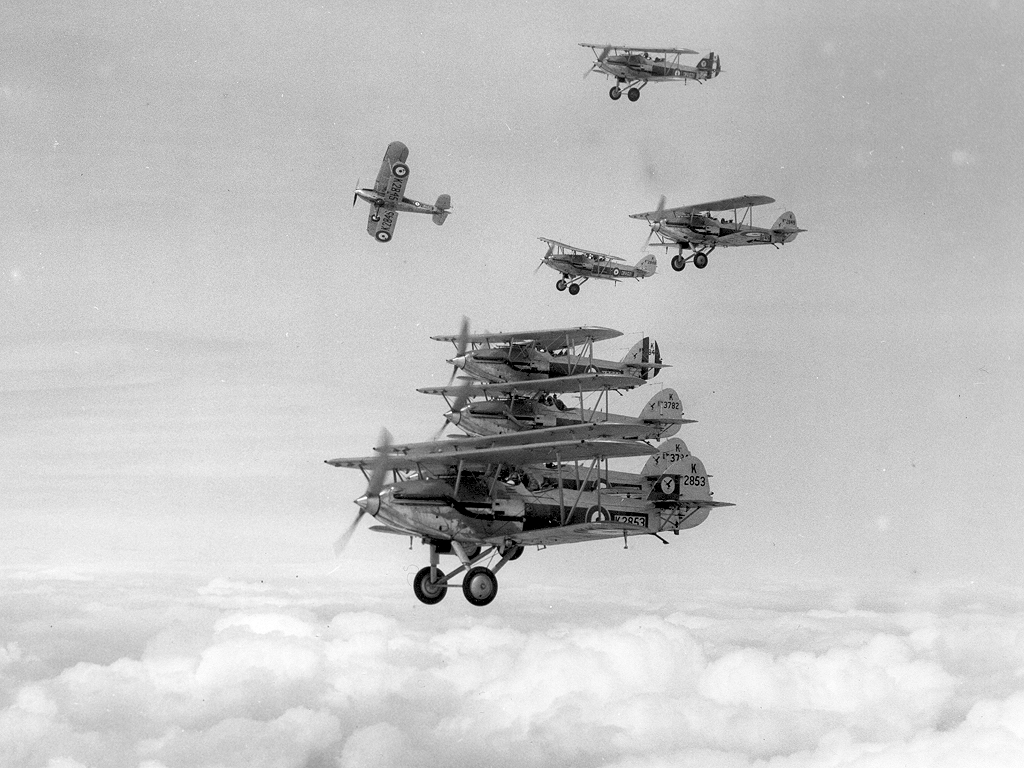
Hawker Demons of No. 23 Squadron

The squadron moved to RAF Biggin Hill in Greater London September 1932 and by April 1933, was fully equipped with Hart fighters, which by then were known as Hawker Demons.

The Abyssinia Crisis in September 1935 led to the squadron being stripped of both aircraft and men in order to reinforce squadrons that were temporarily deployed overseas, with the squadron inventory dropping to a single aircraft in March 1936 before returning to full strength. It moved to RAF Northolt in Greater London in December 1936, moving again in May 1938, this time to RAF Wittering in Cambridgeshire. The squadron replaced its obsolete Demon biplanes in December 1938 with the Bristol Blenheim twin-engine monoplane, another bomber converted to a fighter.

=== Second World War (1939–1945) ===
On the outbreak of the Second World War the squadron, still equipped with Blenheims, became a night-fighter squadron. The squadron scored its first victory of the war on 18 June 1940, when a German Heinkel He 111 was shot down over Cley next the Sea, Norfolk, with another He 111 being shot down the same night, although two Blenheims were lost to return fire from German bombers. As the Blenheim was too slow and lightly armed to be an effective night fighter, the squadron began to operate in the night intruder role in December 1940, attacking German bombers as they returned to their airfields in France.

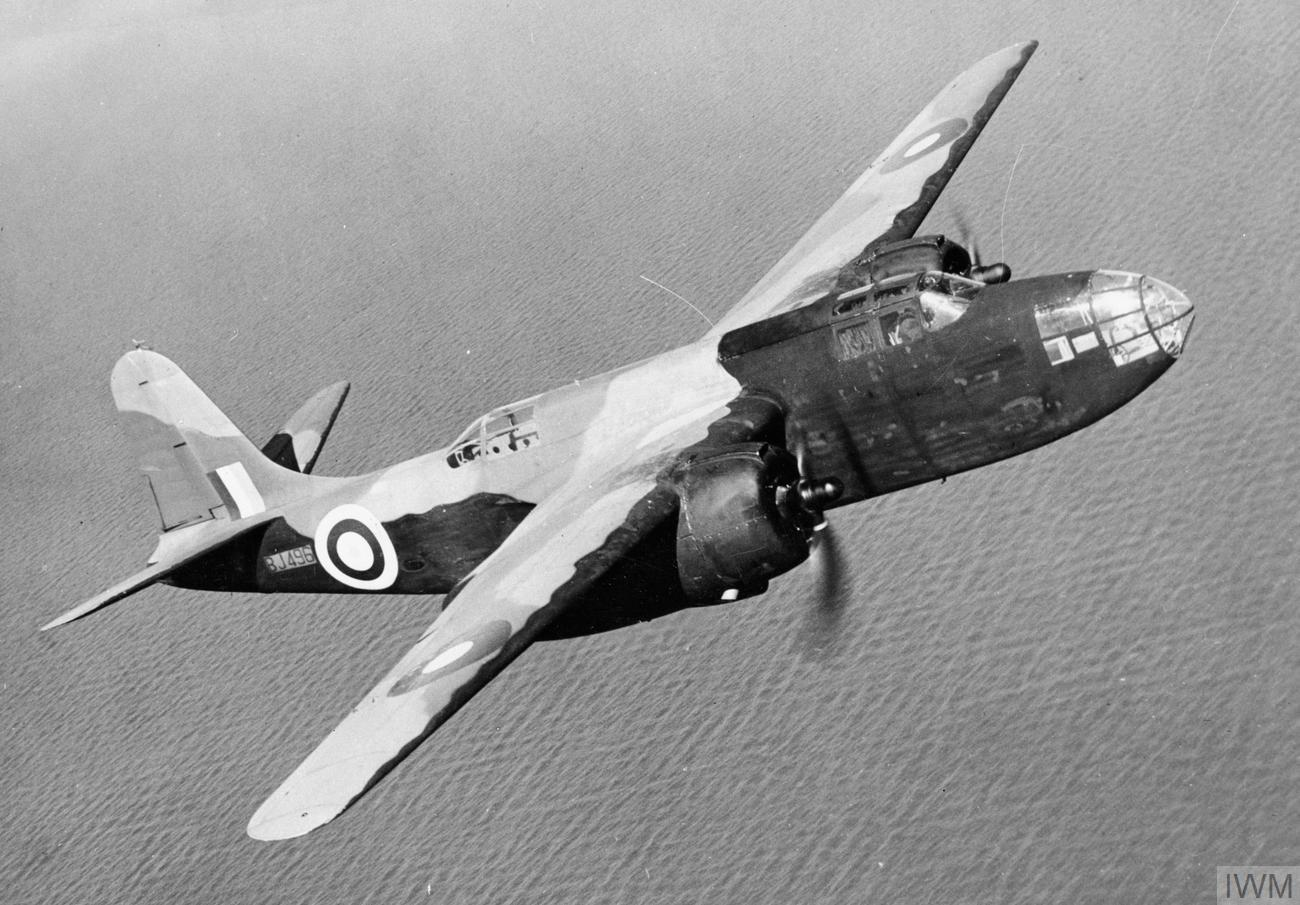
A Douglas Havoc of the type operated by No. 23 Squadron during the 1940s.

From March 1941 the squadron replaced its Blenheims with the American Douglas Havoc, which were supplemented by the Boston III variant of the Havoc in February 1942.

In July 1942, the squadron re-equipped with the more capable de Havilland Mosquito. The squadron transferred to the Mediterranean in December 1942, flying from RAF Luqa in Malta. It attacked enemy airfields and railway targets in Tunisia, Sicily and other areas of Italy throughout 1943, moving to Sardinia in December 1943, which allowed targets in Southern France to be attacked. In June 1944, the squadron returned to England, operating from RAF Little Snoring in Norfolk as part of No. 100 Group. The role of the group was bomber support; to disrupt the Luftwaffe's attempts to stop the British bomber offensive, with No. 23 Squadron being tasked with low level night intruder operations against German night fighters. In addition to its normal night time operations, the squadron also carried out daylight bomber escort missions.

Douglas Bader was a member of No. 23 Squadron when he crashed carrying out low level aerobatics, losing his legs in the process. He went on to become one of the highest scoring flying aces of the RAF in the Second World War. Air Officer Commanding Sir Peter Wykeham was credited with shooting down at least fifteen hostile aircraft at various theatres of the war. He was later promoted to Air Marshal. Following the end of the war, the squadron disbanded on 25 September 1945.

=== Cold War (1946–1990s) ===
No. 23 Squadron was reformed on 1 September 1946 as a night fighter squadron operating the de Havilland Mosquito. It received jet aircraft in the form of the de Havilland Vampire NF.10 in 1953, replacing them with the de Havilland Venom NF.2 in June 1954. The squadron acquired the Venom NF.3 in 1957.

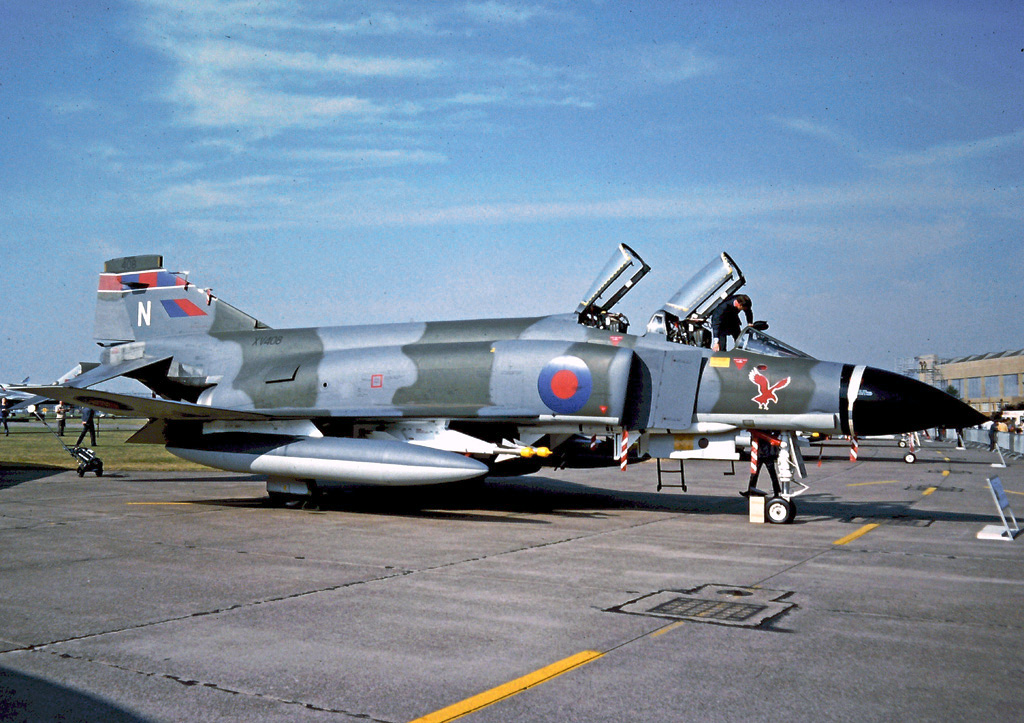
A No. 23 Squadron McDonnell Douglas Phantom FGR.2 wearing the unit's eagle symbol in 1977

The squadron converted to the Gloster Javelin all-weather fighter in 1957, beginning a long period operating in the air defence role. The squadron has a strong heritage in the air defence role, operating the Gloster Javelin, English Electric Lightning, McDonnell Douglas Phantom and the Panavia Tornado F3.

Wing Commander Alan 'Red' Owen was the squadron's commanding officer between May 1962 and October 1964. He had been one of the RAF's most successful night fighter pilots during the Second World War, credited with destroying at least fifteen enemy aircraft.

The squadron first acquired Phantoms on 1 November 1975 at RAF Coningsby in Lincolnshire, before moving to RAF Wattisham in Suffolk for just under ten years.

In October 1983 the squadron deployed to Port Stanley Airport, Falkland Islands after they were liberated from Argentina, arriving there on 1 November. They remained here until 31 October 1988 when its duty was assumed by No. 1435 Flight.

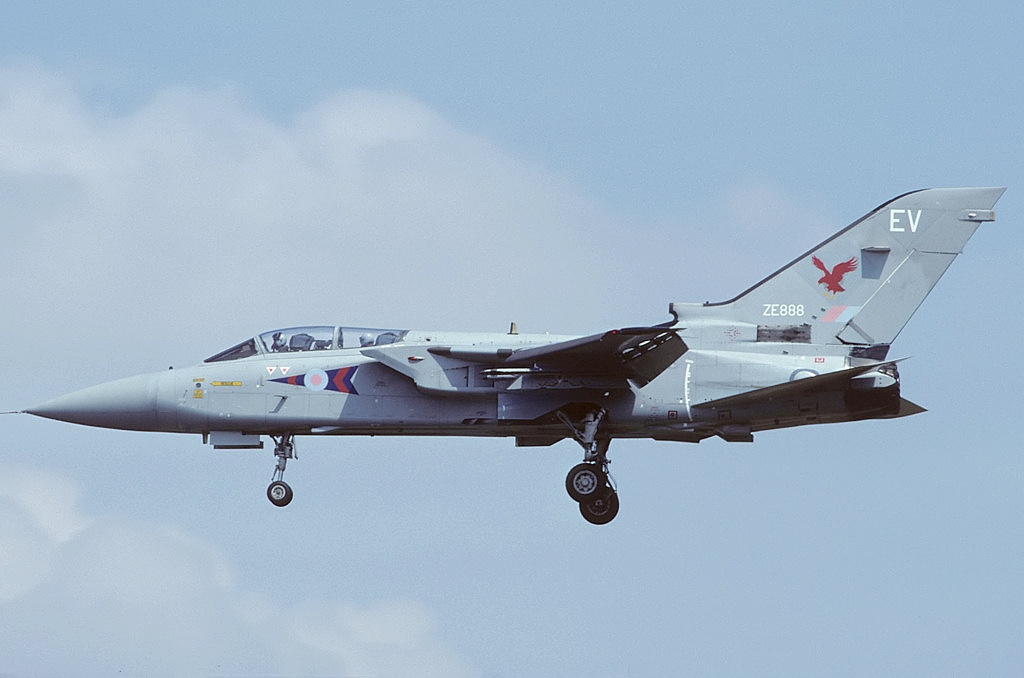
A Panavia Tornado F3 of No. 23 Squadron in 1991

The squadron reformed on 1 November 1988 at RAF Leeming in Yorkshire with the Panavia Tornado F3 which it operated until 26 February 1994, when the unit was disbanded. The squadron assumed the airborne early warning role upon reformation in April 1996, sharing the RAF's Boeing E-3D Sentry AEW1 fleet with No. 8 Squadron at RAF Waddington in Lincolnshire. Flying a majority of control and surveillance sorties over the Balkans, the unit received a battle honour for its direct support during Operation Agricola, the British involvement in the Kosovo War in 1999.

=== Air to air refuelling ===
In the early 1960s at RAF Leuchars, working alongside Vickers Valiant tankers, the squadron developed mid-air refuelling in the RAF.

=== 21st century (2000s) ===
The squadron disbanded on 2 October 2009, when it amalgamated with No. 8 Squadron.

At the Air & Space Power Conference on 17 July 2019, it was announced that No. 23 Squadron would reform as the RAF's first squadron dedicated to the space domain. Subsequently, the RAF decided against using dormant historic RAF squadrons for space operations and instead formed new space squadrons, with No. 23 Squadron remaining dormant.

== Aircraft operated ==
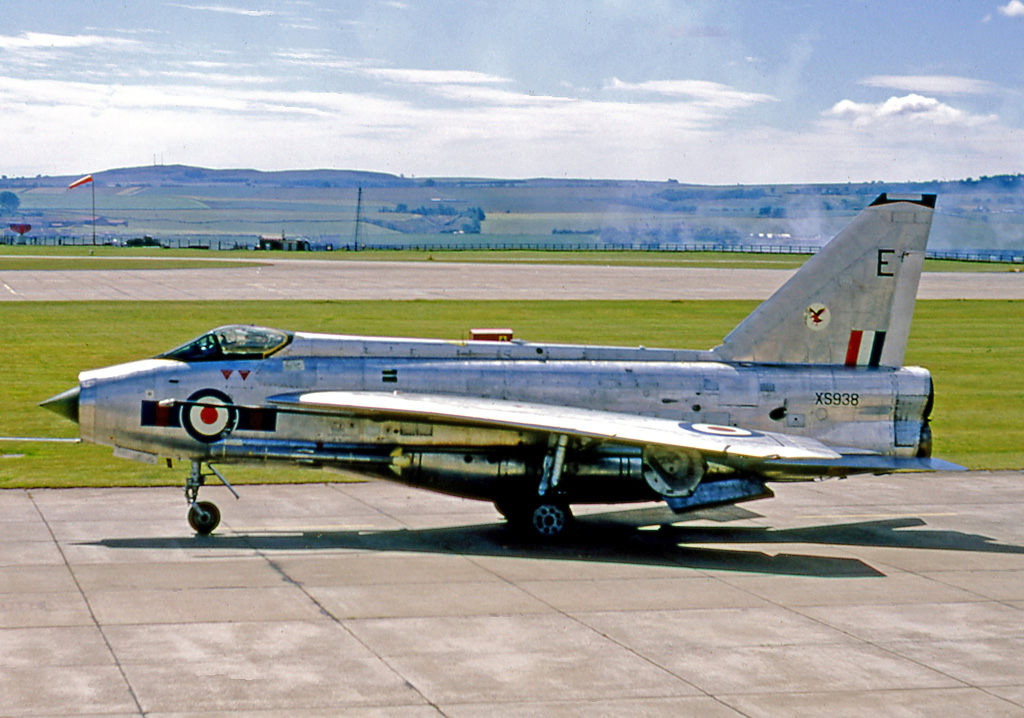
A No. 23 Squadron English Electric Lightning F.6 at its RAF Leuchars base in 1970

- Bleriot XI
- Caudron G.III
- Farman MF.11 Shorthorn
- Avro 504
- Martinsyde S1
- Royal Aircraft Factory B.E.2c
- Royal Aircraft Factory F.E.2b
- Martinsyde G.100
- SPAD S.VII
- SPAD S.XIII
- Sopwith Dolphin
- Sopwith Snipe
- Gloster Gamecock
- Bristol Bulldog
- Hawker Hart
- Hawker Demon
- Bristol Blenheim
- Douglas Havoc I
- Douglas Boston III
- de Havilland Mosquito
- de Havilland Vampire NF.10
- de Havilland Venom
- Gloster Javelin
- English Electric Lightning
- McDonnell-Douglas Phantom FGR2
- Panavia Tornado F3
- Boeing E-3D Sentry AEW1

== Heritage ==
The squadron's badge features an eagle preying on a falcon. It was approved by King George VI in April 1937 and is based on a design used informally prior to approval.

The squadron's motto is Semper Aggressus (Latin for 'Always on the attack').

== Battle honours ==
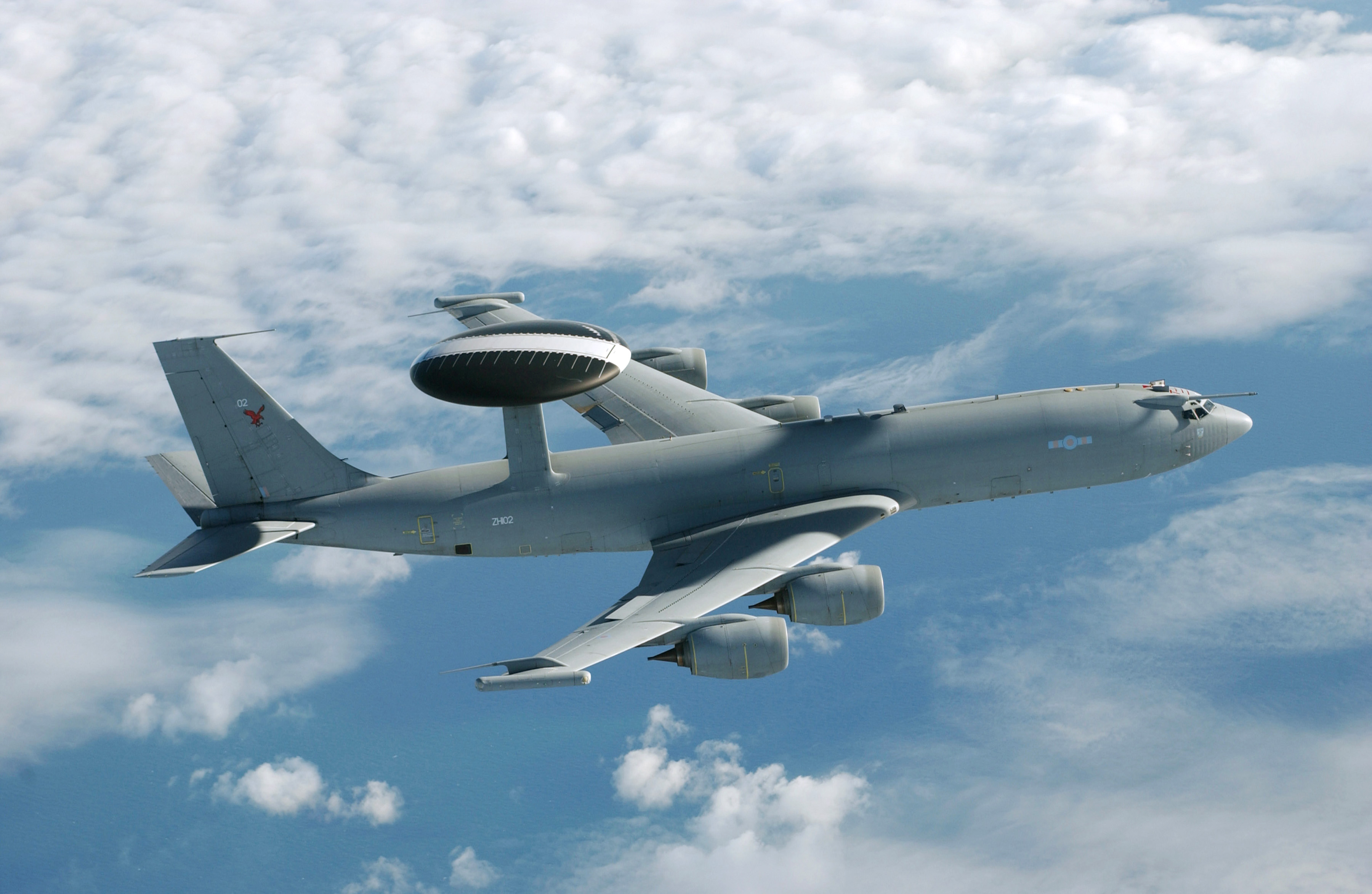
An E-3D Sentry AEW1 with No. 23 Squadron markings in 2002. The Sentry saw active service during the Kosovo War of 1999

No. 23 Squadron has received the following battle honours. Those marked with an asterisk (*) may be emblazoned on the squadron standard.

- Home Defence (1916)*
- Western Front (1916–1918)
- Somme (1916)
- Arras (1917)
- Ypres (1917)*
- Somme (1918)*
- Channel & North Sea (1939–1940)*
- Fortress Europe (1940–1944)
- North Africa (1943)*
- Sicily (1943)
- Italy (1943–1944)*
- Anzio & Nettuno (1944)*
- France & Germany (1944–1945)*
- Ruhr (1944–1945)
- Kosovo (1999)
- Iraq (2003)

== See also ==
- List of Royal Air Force aircraft squadrons

== Bibliography ==
- Foster, Peter. "Farewell No.23 Squadron". Aviation News, 11–24 March 1994, Vol. 22, No. 19. pp. 884–887, 891, 899.
- Halley, James J. Famous Fighter Squadrons of the RAF: Volume 1. Windsor, Berkshire, UK: Hylton Lacey Publishers Ltd., 1971. ISBN 0-85064-100-4.
- Halley, James J. The Squadrons of the Royal Air Force. Tonbridge, Kent, UK: Air Britain (Historians) Ltd., 1980. ISBN 0-85130-083-9
- Halley, James J. The Squadrons of the Royal Air Force & Commonwealth 1918–1988. Tonbridge, Kent, UK: Air Britain (Historians) Ltd., 1988. ISBN 0-85130-164-9.
- Jefford, C.G. RAF Squadrons, a Comprehensive record of the Movement and Equipment of all RAF Squadrons and their Antecedents since 1912. Shropshire, UK: Airlife Publishing, 1988 (second edition 2001). ISBN 1-85310-053-6.
- Lewis, Peter. Squadron Histories: R.F.C, R.N.A.S and R.A.F., 1912–59. London: Putnam, 1959.
- Mason, Francis K. The British Fighter since 1912. Annapolis, Maryland, USA:Naval Institute Press, 1992. ISBN 1-55750-082-7.
- Rawlings, John. Fighter Squadrons of the RAF and their Aircraft. London: Macdonald and Jane's Publishers Ltd., 1969 (second edition 1976). ISBN 0-354-01028-X.
- Shores, Christopher; Franks, Norman & Guest, Russell. Above The Trenches: A Complete Record of the Fighter Aces and Units of the British Empire Air Forces 1915–1920. London: Grub Street, 1990. ISBN 0-948817-19-4.
