= William Kennedy-Cochran-Patrick =

British World War I flying ace (1896–1933)

William John Charles Kennedy-Cochran-Patrick
- Born: 25 May 1896; Beith, Ayrshire, Scotland
- Died: 26 September 1933 (aged 37); Baragwanath Airport, Johannesburg, South Africa
- Military career
- Allegiance: United Kingdom
- Branch: British Army; Royal Air Force
- Service years: 1915–1919
- Rank: Major
- Units: The Rifle Brigade; Royal Flying Corps: No. 1 Aeroplane Depot; No. 70 Squadron; No. 23 Squadron
- Commands: No. 60 Squadron
- Conflicts: First World War
- Awards: Distinguished Service Order, Military Cross & Bar
- Other work: Aerial surveys in South America, Burma, Iraq, and Africa

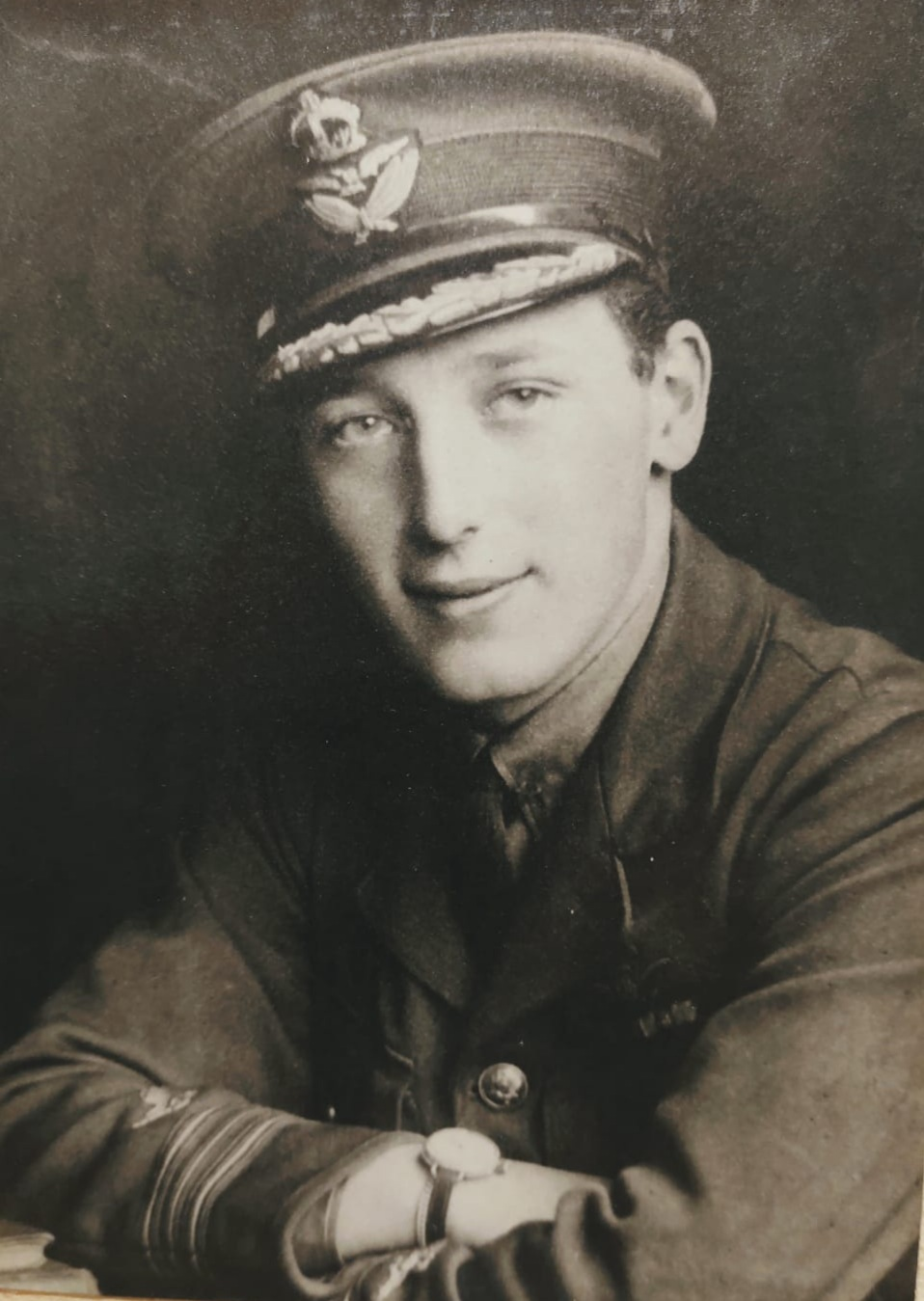

Major William John Charles Kennedy-Cochran-Patrick DSO, MC & Bar (25 May 1896 – 26 September 1933) was a Scottish First World War flying ace, credited with 21 aerial victories. He was the leading ace flying the Spad VII fighter, and of No. 23 Squadron. He later flew aerial surveys on three continents.

== Early life and service ==
Kennedy-Cochran-Patrick was born in Beith, Ayrshire, Scotland on 25 May 1896, the only son of Neil James Kennedy-Cochran-Patrick (later Sir Neil) and Eleonora Agnes Kennedy-Cochran-Patrick of Woodside and Ladyland. He had three sisters, all younger.

He attended Wellington College in Berkshire and Trinity College, Cambridge before training at the Royal Military College, Sandhurst.

== Flying service ==
Kennedy-Cochran-Patrick qualified as a pilot in April 1915. He was so skilled a flier that he was assigned as chief test pilot to No. 1 Aeroplane Depot at Saint-Omer, France. He was officially seconded to the Royal Flying Corps from The Rifle Brigade on 11 June 1915.

On 17 March 1916, he was promoted from second lieutenant to lieutenant while staying seconded to the RFC. On 26 April, he achieved his first victory despite his test pilot status. He used Nieuport No. 5172 to attack an LVG C-type three times. The LVG crash-landed with a dead crew. He was awarded the Military Cross on 16 May 1916, for this capture of an enemy plane.

As a result of his victory and award, he was transferred to No. 70 Squadron to fly Sopwith 1½ Strutters. He scored victories two and three on 14 and 15 September 1916, having his observer killed on both occasions.

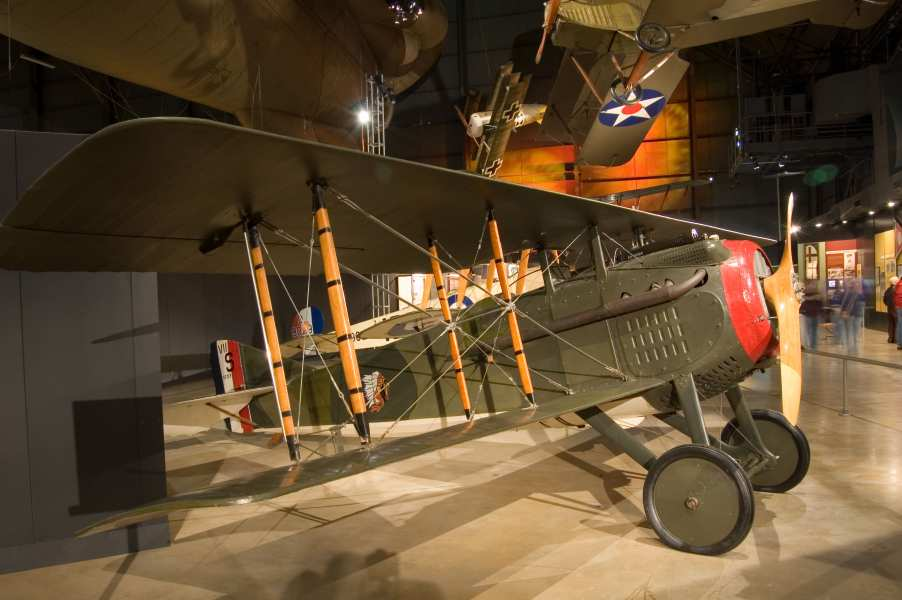
SPAD S.VII at the National Museum of the US Air Force

He was promoted to captain and transferred to No. 23 Squadron in early 1917 to fly Spad VIIs. He shot a double on 22 April to become an ace. He won twice more in April, and again on 2 May. His next victory, on 11 May, would be his most notable; he set afire the Albatros D.III of Jasta 5's triple-ace Offz. Stlvtr. Edmund Nathanael, its fuselage falling away from its wings and plunged in flames to earth.

It was also during this stretch that he was entrusted by Major General Hugh Trenchard to evaluate the new Spad XIII at La Bonne Maison Aerodrome. He turned in his report to Trenchard on 1 May 1917.

Kennedy-Cochran-Patrick claimed three more times in May, four times in June, and five in July. After his final victory, on 16 July 1917, he was promoted to acting Major on 22 July, and given command of No. 60 Squadron.

In lieu of a second award, he was awarded a Bar to his Military Cross on 14 August 1917. A month later, on 17 September he was awarded the Distinguished Service Order.

He was Mentioned in Despatches on 7 November 1917 by Field Marshal Sir Douglas Haig. He was denoted as a lieutenant doing a job two grades his senior; he was a temporary major.

At the end of 1917 he was transferred back to England to the Training Directorate of the Air Board. From there, he returned to No. 1 AD in 1918.

His war time tally was 1 captured, 6 and 4 shared destroyed, 9 and 1 shared 'out of control'.

== Postwar life ==
He resigned his commission on 9 July 1919. He became a major in the General Reserve of Officers the same day.

He married Natalie Bertha Tanner of Larches, Rusherville, Kent on 20 July 1924. They had a single son two years later, Neil Aylmer Kennedy-Cochran-Patrick (later Neil Aylmer Hunter).

He went on to fly a lot of aerial survey work in the postwar years. He carried out surveys in South America, Burma, Iraq, and Africa. He established his own company, The Aircraft Operating Company of South Africa Pty Ltd. He had a contract for a 20,000-square-mile (52,000 km^{2}) air route survey in Northern Rhodesia (now Zambia).

He was elected to membership of the Royal Aero Club on 10 December 1930.

Then, on 26 September 1933, he took off from Baragwanath Airport near Johannesburg, South Africa, flying a de Havilland DH.84 Dragon, registration ZS-AEF. He stalled out at 250 feet (76 m) after making a steep turn. The resulting crash killed him and his passenger, Sir Michael Oppenheimer, 2nd Baronet. The previous day he had flown the author, adventurer and politician Deneys Reitz and his family, on a test flight; Reitz had criticised his reckless flying.

== Honours and awards ==
Military Cross (MC)

2nd Lt. William John Charles Kennedy-Cochran-Patrick, Rif. Brig, and R.F.C. For conspicuous skill and determination. He climbed and attacked an enemy machine at 14,000 feet and, although he failed in his first and second attacks, he went for it again a third time, shot both pilot and observer and brought it down. He followed it down and landed alongside.

Military Cross (MC) Bar

Lt. (T./Capt.) William John Charles Kennedy-Cochran-Patrick, M.C., Rif. Bde. and R.F.C. For conspicuous gallantry in attacking hostile aircraft. Within two months he brought down two hostile machines in flames, and four others completely out of control. In addition, he has driven several others down in a damaged condition.

Distinguished Service Order (DSO)

Lt. (T./Capt.) William John Charles Kennedy-Cochran-Patrick, M.C., Bif. Bde. and R.F.C. For conspicuous gallantry and devotion to duty on numerous occasions in destroying and driving down hostile machines, frequently engaging the enemy with great dash and a fine offensive spirit when encountered in superior numbers. By his cool judgment and splendid fearlessness he has instilled confidence in all around him, his brilliant leadership being chiefly responsible for his numerous successes.
