= William Meggitt =

Welsh flying ace (1894–1927)

William Geoffrey Meggitt
- Born: 8 April 1894; Mansfield, Nottinghamshire
- Died: 28 January 1927 (aged 32–33); Norbury, London, England
- Burial place: Golders Green, London.
- Military career
- Allegiance: United Kingdom
- Branch: British Army; Royal Air Force
- Service years: 1915–1927
- Rank: Flight Lieutenant
- Units: Welsh Regiment; No. 25 Squadron RFC; No. 22 Squadron RFC; No. 41 Squadron RAF
- Awards: Military Cross

Flight Lieutenant William Geoffrey Meggitt MC (8 April 1894 – 28 January 1927) was a British World War I flying ace credited with six aerial victories.

== World War I ==
Meggitt was commissioned as a Second Lieutenant (on probation) in the 3rd (Reserve) Battalion, Welsh Regiment, on 31 March 1915, and was confirmed in his rank on 2 November. He was later seconded to the Royal Flying Corps, and was appointed a Flying Officer (observer) on 28 October 1916.

Posted to No. 25 Squadron RFC, flying the F.E.2b two-seater fighter Meggitt gained his first aerial victories on 22 October 1916, destroying two Type D aircraft, the first with Sergeant William Drummond Matheson early in the morning south-west of Seclin, and another in the late afternoon north-west of Lille with Second Lieutenant D. S. Johnson. On 17 November 1916 he took part in the destruction by fire of an enemy aircraft over Vitry, piloted by Captain R. Chadwick, and shared with Second Lieutenant H. Dunlop & Lieutenant Harry Scandrett, Second Lieutenant D. S. Johnson & Lieutenant I. Heald, Second Lieutenant H. L. Chadwick & Second Lieutenant C. J. Butler, Sergeant James Green & Corporal A. G. Bower. On 15 February 1917, with Captain Lancelot Richardson, he drove down out of control a Type C aircraft over Avion.

Meggitt was transferred from the Special Reserve to Regular Army on 31 March 1917, and was also awarded the Military Cross, which was gazetted on 17 April 1917. His citation read:

2nd Lieutenant William Geoffrey Meggitt, Welsh Regiment, Special Reserve and Royal Flying Corps.

"For conspicuous gallantry and devotion to duty whilst one of a patrol engaging five hostile machines. He drove down one enemy machine and then attacked another, which was seen to go down vertically. He has previously brought down three hostile machines."

He then trained as a pilot, and was appointed a Flying Officer on 8 June 1917. Promoted to lieutenant on 1 July, he was posted to No. 22 Squadron RFC, flying the two-seater Bristol Fighter. He gained his fifth aerial victory on 10 October, destroying an Albatros D.V over Moorslede with observer Air Mechanic 1st Class Arch Whitehouse. The next day, with Captain Francis Albert Durrad as his observer he drove down another D.V.

Meggitt was shot down near Moorslede, Belgium, on 8 November 1917 flying Bristol Fighter B1123 and initially listed as missing in action, but was eventually reported as being a prisoner of the Germans in early 1918. Captain Durrad, 28, from Oadby, Leics., was killed.

== Post World War I ==
Meggitt was repatriated on June 2, 1918, under a Wounded Prisoner Exchange Scheme, having suffered head injuries when shot down. He spent several months recuperating in hospital in the UK. On 1 August 1919 was granted a permanent commission in the Royal Air Force with the rank of lieutenant, resigning his commission in the Welsh Regiment the same day.

During his RFC career, on 29 December 1916, while flying with Lt A.P. Maurice, he - and his pilot - suffered slight injuries when they were brought down by enemy fire at Lozinghem in FE2b A5451. On 1 June 1917, at the Central Flying School at Upavon during his 16-week pilot training course, he was injured when BE12 A4010 was involved in a Flying accident on landing. On 11 October 1917, he and Capt. Durrad escaped harm when enemy fighters attacked Bristol Fighter A7223 on an offensive patrol over the 5th Army front.

On 2 January 1922, in the 1922 New Year Honours, Meggitt was promoted from flying officer to flight lieutenant. He served for some time at RAF Ramleh on Bristol Fighters with 14 Squadron, then on 22 September 1923 he was posted to the School of Photography for course in engineering at the Royal Aircraft Establishment on his transfer to the Home Establishment. He was posted to the RAF Depot on 1 September 1924, and on 6 September 1926 to the Station headquarters at RAF Upavon.

Meggitt was attached to No. 41 Squadron RAF on 28 January 1927 to undertake flight trial of Siskin III, J7171. Flying from Northolt to Kenley, he lost control during a gale and crashed in the rear garden of a house at 11 Beatrice Ave, Norbury, London SW. He was removed from the aircraft unconscious by milk roundsman Sydney Robinson but died of his injuries on the way to Croydon General Hospital. A verdict of Death by Misadventure was returned by an inquest jury who heard the aeroplane suddenly plummeted to the ground while flying into the teeth of a gale. William Meggitt was 32-years-old at the time of his death, and left a widow - Lydia Bertha Elizabeth Meggitt, and a young son. They had been married for nine years and lived at Evering Rd, London N.16. As befitted an ace, Meggitt's hearse was met by the RAF band and a large contingent of officers and men at Golders Green. His hat and medals rested on the coffin, which was draped in the Union Flag. Born at Mansfield where his father ran a glue manufacturing company, his parents had later retired to Newport in Wales. His uncle, Prof. Joseph Husband, was a noted engineer of his time who in 1917 established the Civil Engineering Department at the University of Sheffield, developing world-renowned expertise in bridge building and structural engineering. Prior to enlistment, William had planned to become an engineer.

== Bibliography ==
- Franks, Norman; Guest, Russell; Alegi, Gregory (2008). Above The War Fronts: A Complete Record of the British Two-seater Bomber Pilot and Observer Aces, the British Two-seater Fighter Observer Aces, and the Belgian, Italian, Austro-Hungarian and Russian Fighter Aces, 1914–1918. Grub Street Publishing. ISBN 1898697566, ISBN 978-1898697565
- Kenley Revival - History of Kenley Airfield Facebook Group.
- https://asn.flightsafety.org/wikibase/211872
