= Chester Stairs Duffus =

- Born: 1 March 1891; Halifax, Nova Scotia, Canada
- Died: 23 February 1981 (aged 89)
- Military career
- Allegiance: Canada; United Kingdom
- Branch: Royal Flying Corps; Royal Air Force
- Service years: 1915–1919
- Rank: Major
- Unit: No. 22 Squadron RFC
- Commands: No. 25 Squadron RAF
- Awards: Order of the British Empire, Military Cross

Major Chester Stairs Duffus OBE MC (1 March 1891 – 23 February 1981) was a World War I flying ace credited with five aerial victories.

== World War I service ==
Duffus joined the Royal Flying Corps in 1915, and flew Royal Aircraft Factory FE.2b pusher two-seaters for No. 22 Squadron during 1916; one of his observer gunners was fellow ace Corporal Frank Johnson. He scored five victories between 17 August and 11 December 1916. He survived a forced landing after his fourth win on 4 December, landing near Bapaume. His last triumph was shared with fellow aces Captain Selden Long and another pilot.

Duffus went on to command No. 25 Squadron.

== Post World War I ==
Duffus married Evelyn Giles at New Market on 21 June 1919; the union would produce a daughter, born the following year.

Chester Stairs Duffus died on 23 February 1981.

== Honors and awards ==
Military Cross (MC)

Chester Stairs Duffus, a Second Lieutenant in the Royal Flying Corps (Special Reserve), was awarded the Military Cross for skill and gallantry in aerial combat. His record shows that after sustained fighting, he destroyed an enemy aircraft, which crashed in flames on the Allied side of the lines.
