= William Drummond Matheson =

Canadian World War I flying ace

- Born: 7 August 1890; New Glasgow, Nova Scotia, Canada
- Died: 14 December 1961 (aged 71); New Glasgow, Nova Scotia, Canada
- Burial place: Lorne Street Cemetery, New Glasgow, Nova Scotia, Canada
- Military career
- Allegiance: Canada; United Kingdom
- Branch: Royal Flying Corps
- Rank: Captain
- Unit: No. 25 Squadron RFC
- Awards: Military Cross

Captain William Drummond Matheson MC was a Canadian World War I flying ace credited with five aerial victories.

Sergeant Matheson was promoted to temporary 2nd lieutenant (on probation) on 12 November 1916. He continued to serve with #25 Squadron from 12 November 1916 to 16 March 1917. Wounded by machine gun fire, his left foot had to be amputated. After his hospitalization in Canada, on 2 Oct 1918 he was posted to the School of Special Flying; and on 19 December 1918 he was again posted, this time to Headquarters.

His citation for the Military Cross, published in the Supplement to the London Gazette, states:

Temp. 2nd Lt. William Drummond Matheson, Genl. List and R.F.C.
For conspicuous gallantry and devotion to duty in leading a formation of eight machines against 16 of the enemy. He drove down one hostile machine and eventually succeeded in landing his machine safely in spite of being attacked by several enemy machines. On other occasions he has brought down four hostile machines.

== List of aerial victories ==
See also Aerial victory standards of World War I.

| No. | Date/time | Aircraft | Foe | Result | Location | Notes |
|---|---|---|---|---|---|---|
| 1 | 22 October 1916 @ 09:00 hours | Royal Aircraft Factory FE.2b serial number 7007 | German Scout | Destroyed | Southwest of Seclin | Observer: William Meggitt |
| 2 | 22 November 1916 | FE.2b | Enemy aircraft | Driven down | Arras | |
| 3 | 24 January 1917 | FE.2b | German scout | Driven down | Mericourt | |
| 4 | 4 March 1917 @ 11:15 hours | FE.2b s/n 7025 | LVG two-seater | Destroyed | Courrieres | Observer: W. A. Barnes. Victory shared with three air crews, including Reginald Malcolm and Leonard Herbert Emsden |
| 5 | 16 March 1917 | FE.2b | Enemy aircraft | Driven down | Neuvireuil | |
