= Leonard Herbert Emsden =

- Born: 13 November 1893; Bosmere, Suffolk, England
- Died: 11 November 1976 (aged 82)
- Military career
- Allegiance: United Kingdom
- Branch: British Army
- Service years: 1914–1918
- Rank: Sergeant
- Unit: No. 25 Squadron RFC
- Awards: Distinguished Conduct Medal

Sergeant Leonard Herbert Emsden DCM was an observer and gunner aboard Royal Aircraft Factory FE.2b two-seater airplanes. He began scoring aerial victories during March 1917, continued winning through Bloody April, and capped his career as a flying ace with three victories on 1 May 1917. He was credited with a total of eight confirmed aerial triumphs.

== Early life ==
His birthplace is known to be Bosmere, Suffolk, England. His parents were Laura Gant and John Arthur Emsden, who were married in Elmsett, Suffolk, England in 1888. Leonard was the middle child of five in this family, having two elder sisters and two younger brothers. They were orphaned when their father died on 7 February 1898. Laura Emsden would remarry within a year, and supply another daughter to the brood.

== World War I ==
Emsden volunteered to join the military in 1914 during World War I to serve his country, and was sent to France in 1915. As a sergeant with the Bedfordshire Regiment, and after 79 commissioned officers were killed in one day, he personally led three bayonet charges up Hill 60 at the Second Battle of Ypres, taking his objective at the third attempt. He also served with distinction at the battles of the Somme, Cambrai, and St. Quentin. Having survived those battles, he volunteered for the Royal Flying Corps.

He ended up in the Royal Flying Corps as an aircraft mechanic in No. 25 Squadron. He became a gunner on the unit's Royal Aircraft Factory FE.2b pusher aircraft. As the gunner's duties were described:

"When you stood up to shoot, all of you from the knees up was exposed to the elements. There was no (safety) belt to hold you. Only your grip on the gun and the sides of the nacelle stood between you and eternity. Toward the front of the nacelle was a hollow steel rod with a swivel mount to which the gun was anchored. This gun covered a huge field of fire forward.... You had nothing to worry about except being blown out of the aircraft by the blast of air or tossed out bodily if the pilot made a wrong move. There were no parachutes..."

From March through May 1917, Emsden was an Air Mechanic 2nd Class assigned to observer/gunner's duty. He was already an ace on 1 May, when he scored two victories on a morning sortie and a third one in the afternoon. He was wounded in action in the hand. His valorous feats would earn him the Distinguished Conduct Medal, which was gazetted on 18 June 1917:

65935 2nd Class Air Mech. L. H. Emsden, R.F.C.
For conspicuous gallantry and devotion to duty. He has displayed the utmost gallantry and skill as an observer in aerial combats, continually bringing down his opponents with great skill and daring.

Emsden would subsequently be promoted to corporal, then to sergeant before returning home.

== List of aerial victories ==
Victories
No.	Date/time	Aircraft	Foe	Result	Location	Notes
1	4 March 1917 @ 1115 hours	Royal Aircraft Factory F.E.2b; Serial number 7693	LVG two-seater	Destroyed	Courrières, France	Pilot: Reginald Malcolm. Victory shared with William Drummond Matheson and observer, two other air crews
2	17 March 1917 @ 1115 hours	Royal Aircraft Factory F.E.2b s/n 6940	Albatros D.III fighter	Set afire in midair	Between Oppy, Pas-de-Calais and Beaumont, France	Pilot: H. E. Davis
3	17 March 1917 @ 1725 hours	Royal Aircraft Factory F.E.2b s/n 7683	Albatros D.III fighter	Driven down out of control	Arras, France	Pilot: James Leith Leith
4	6 April 1917 @ 1045 hours	Royal Aircraft Factory F.E.2b s/n 4847	Halberstadt fighter	Destroyed	East of Vimy, France	Pilot: B. King
5	13 April 1917 @ 1930 hours	Royal Aircraft Factory F.E.2b s/n A6383	Albatros D.III fighter	Destroyed	Hénin-Liétard, France	Pilot: Reginald Malcolm
6	1 May 1917 @ 0620 hours	Royal Aircraft Factory F.E.2b s/n 7672	Albatros D.III fighter	Destroyed	Izel-lès-Hameau, France	Pilot: Reginald Malcolm
7	1 May 1917 @ 0645 hours	Royal Aircraft Factory F.E.2b s/n 7672	Albatros D.III fighter	Captured	West of Lens, France	Pilot: Reginald Malcolm
8	1 May 1918 @ 1800 hours	Royal Aircraft Factory F.E.2b s/n 7672	Albatros D.III fighter	Set afire in midair	Bois-Bernard, France	Pilot: Reginald Malcolm

== Bibliography ==
- Franks, Norman; Guest, Russell F. & Alegi, Gregory (1997). Above the War Fronts: The British Two-seater Bomber Pilot and Observer Aces, the British Two-seater Fighter Observer Aces, and the Belgian, Italian, Austro-Hungarian and Russian Fighter Aces, 1914–1918. London, UK: Grub Street. ISBN 978-1-898697-56-5.
- Libby, Frederick (2000). Horses Don't Fly. Arcade Publishing. ISBN 978-1-55970-526-4.
- Guttman, Jon & Dempsey, Harry (2009). Pusher Aces of World War I. Osprey Publishing. ISBN 978-1-84603-417-6.
