= James Robert Smith =

James Robert Smith may refer to:

- James Robert Smith (RAF officer) (1891–after 1919), World War I flying ace
- Bob Smith (defensive back, born 1925) or James Robert Smith (1925–2002), American football defensive back and halfback
- James Robert Smith (author) (born 1957), American author

== See also ==
- James Smith (disambiguation)
