= Reginald George Malcolm =

- Born: Either 14 January 1891, or 1890; Either Owen Sound, Canada or Manitoba, Canada
- Died: After 16 December 1918
- Military career
- Allegiance: Canada; United Kingdom
- Branch: Royal Flying Corps
- Service years: 1917–1918
- Rank: Captain
- Unit: No. 25 Squadron RFC
- Commands: Aerial Fighting School No. 2
- Awards: Military Cross

Captain Reginald George Malcolm MC was a Canadian flying ace during World War I. He was credited with eight aerial victories scored during March, April, and May 1916.

== Early life ==
Reginald George Malcolm was a Canadian, though there are conflicting accounts of his birthplace and birth date. Some aviation historians state he was born in Manitoba, Canada in 1890. The Canadian Great War Project, as well as the Aerodrome website, give his birthplace as Owen Sound, Ontario, and the date as 14 January 1891. He was a bachelor working as a clerk in civil life before he joined the military.

When he decided to join military service to fight in the First World War, he first learned to fly in the United States. He earned Aero Club of America Pilot's Certificate No. 440 from the Wright School in Augusta, Georgia on 29 March 1916.

== First World War service ==
Malcolm joined the Royal Flying Corps and was placed on the General List; on 24 February 1917 second lieutenant R. G. Malcolm was appointed a Flying Officer. Eight days later, he scored his first aerial victory while teamed with Leonard Herbert Emsden in a pusher Royal Aircraft Factory FE.2d. Sometimes teamed with Emsden, sometimes with other gunners, Malcolm was already an ace when he and Emsden finished off their respective victory strings with three victories on 1 May 1917.

The action that day was vividly described in public records:

On 1 May 1917, he was one of a formation of six which was attacked by 15 hostile scouts. He attacked one which he shot down and destroyed near Izel. A little later he was attacked by five scouts, one of which he drove down damaged. This machine was seen to land just west of Lens. Again, on the same patrol, he drove off two scouts which were attacking one of our artillery machines. Later in the same day, whilst on a bomb raid, he was attacked by a red scout, which damaged his engine. He immediately dived, and his observer shot down the hostile machine, which fell in flames in Bois-Bernard. 2nd Lieutenant Malcolm managed to land on our side of the lines.

Emsden, his observer that day, was wounded in the hand during the fray.

Malcolm was withdrawn from combat on 18 June 1917 and posted to Home Establishment in Britain. On 18 July, his Military Cross award for courage was gazetted:

For conspicuous gallantry and devotion to duty. He has shown exceptional skill and courage in aerial fighting. He has several times been attacked by superior numbers, and on each occasion has accounted for more than one of the hostile machines and effected a safe landing himself.

On 1 July 1918, he was both promoted to captain and shipped home to Canada. Once there, he commanded Aerial Fighting School No. 2 at Beamsville, Ontario, Canada until he was transferred to staff duty at headquarters on 16 December 1918.

== List of aerial victories ==
No.	Date/time	Aircraft	Foe	Result	Location	Notes
1	4 March 1917 @ 1115 hours	Royal Aircraft Factory FE.2d serial number 7693	LVG two-seater	Destroyed	Courrieres, France	Gunner: Leonard Herbert Emsden; victory shared with William Drummond Matheson and gunner, two other air crews
2	17 March 1917 circa 1130 hours	Royal Aircraft Factory FE.2d s/n A782	Albatros D.II	Destroyed	Between Oppy and Beaumont, France	Gunner: C. W. Wilson
3	13 April 1917 @ 1930 hours	Royal Aircraft Factory FE.2d s/n A6385	Albatros D.III	Destroyed	Hénin-Liétard, France	Gunner: Leonard Herbert Emsden
4	14 April 1917 @ 1930 hours	Royal Aircraft Factory FE.2d s/n A6383	Albatros D.III	Destroyed	Henin-Lietard, France	Gunner: C.W. Weir; victory shared with another air crew
5	21 April 1917 @ 1845 hours	Royal Aircraft Factory FE.2d s/n A8375	Captured	Albatros D.III	Between Thélus and Vimy, France	Gunner: C.W. Weir; victory shared with Anthony Arnold RNAS
6	1 May 1917 @ 0620 hours	Royal Aircraft Factory FE.2d s/n 7672	Albatros D.III	Destroyed	Izel-lès-Hameau, France	Gunner: Leonard Herbert Emsden
7	1 May 1917 @ 0645 hours	Royal Aircraft Factory FE.2d s/n 7672	Albatros D.III	Captured	West of Lens	Gunner: Leonard Herbert Emsden
8	1 May 1917 @ 1800 hours	Royal Aircraft Factory FE.2d s/n 7672	Albatros D.III	Destroyed; set afire in midair	Bois-Bernard, France	Gunner: Leonard Herbert Emsden

== Post war ==
After Reginald George Malcolm was transferred to staff duty at headquarters on 16 December 1918, he fades from history's view.
