= Hartley Pullan =

British flying ace (1899–1968)

- Born: 9 October 1899; Knaresborough, England
- Died: 1968 (aged 68–69)
- Military career
- Allegiance: United Kingdom
- Branch: British Army; Royal Air Force
- Service years: 1917–1919
- Rank: Lieutenant
- Unit: No. 25 Squadron RFC/RAF
- Conflicts: World War I • Western Front
- Awards: Distinguished Flying Cross

Hartley Pullan DFC (9 October 1899 – 1968) was an English soldier. A World War I flying ace, he was credited with five aerial victories.

== Military career ==
Pullan entered the Royal Flying Corps as a cadet, and was commissioned as a temporary second lieutenant (on probation) on 28 November 1917, only three weeks after his 18th birthday. He was posted to No. 25 Squadron RFC, to serve as an observer flying in the Airco DH.4 in early 1918.

His first aerial victory came on 29 March, with pilot Second Lieutenant S. Jones, destroying an enemy two-seater over Foucaucourt. Soon afterwards, on 1 April, the Army's Royal Flying Corps (RFC) and the Royal Naval Air Service were merged to form the Royal Air Force. Pullan was confirmed in his rank two months later on 20 May. His second victory came on 8 June, flying with Lieutenant W. H. G. Milnes, driving down out of control a Fokker Dr.I between Lille and Tournai. His next two victories were both with pilot Lieutenant L. Young over Lille, destroying a Pfalz D.III on 24 July, and driving down another on 4 August. His fifth and final victory was while flying with Lieutenant J. H. Latchford, driving down another Pfalz D.III over Douai on 22 August.

Pullan was subsequently awarded the Distinguished Flying Cross, which was gazetted in September 1918. His citation read:

Second Lieutenant Hartley Pullan.

"This officer has taken part in numerous long-distance bombing raids and reconnaissances. His work has been consistently good. On a recent occasion when on photographic reconnaissance he was attacked by three scouts; he shot one down and the other two dived away. A few minutes later he was again attacked, this time by five triplanes, one of which he shot down out of control."

He was promoted to lieutenant on 30 November 1918.

Pullen left the RAF after the war, being transferred to the unemployed list on 10 April 1919.
