= Richard M. Trevethan =

British First World War flying ace

Richard Michael Trevethan
- Born: 24 January 1895; Park City, Utah, USA
- Died: 30 December 1971 (aged 76); Truro, Cornwall, England
- Military career
- Allegiance: United Kingdom
- Branch: British Army; Royal Air Force
- Service years: 1914–1935
- Rank: Squadron leader
- Units: South Lancashire Regiment; No. 20 Squadron RFC; No. 207 Squadron RAF; No. 39 Squadron RAF; No. 100 Squadron RAF
- Commands: No. 440 (Fleet Reconnaissance) Flight; Flying and Parachute Test Squadron
- Conflicts: First World War; Gallipoli campaign; Western Front; Northern Russian Expedition; Chanak Crisis; Second World War
- Awards: Military Cross; Order of St. Anna, 2nd class (Russia)

Squadron Leader Richard Michael Trevethan MC (24 January 1895 – 30 December 1971) was a British First World War flying ace credited with twelve aerial victories.

== Early life and background ==
Richard Trevethan was born in Park City, Utah in 1895, to Michael Trevethan and his wife Clara Emma (née Pearce). The Trevethans were a long-established family from Perranzabuloe in Cornwall, an area with a strong mining tradition. Park City had been established as a mining town. However, by 1901 the family had returned to Cornwall, and were living at St Kew.

Trevethan attended Falmouth Grammar School, Portsmouth Grammar School, and the Imperial College of Science, London.

== First World War service ==
On 22 September 1914, Trevethan was commissioned a temporary second lieutenant and served in the 6th Battalion, South Lancashire Regiment, seeing active service in France and in the Gallipoli campaign in 1915.

On 14 May 1917, Trevethan was transferred the General List to serve in the Royal Flying Corps, and was posted to No. 20 Squadron RFC to fly a two-seater F.E.2.d fighter. His first aerial victory came on 2 June 1917, with AM2 John Cowell as his gunner, and he gained his second a week later, on 9 June, with Second Lieutenant M. Dudbridge. He was promoted to lieutenant on 1 July 1917, and then ran up a string of ten more victories between 2 July and 9 August, all but one with Lieutenant Campbell Hoy as his gunner. In total, Trevethan was credited with destroying six Albatros fighters and driving down another six out of control.

On 17 August 1917 Trevethan was awarded the Military Cross, which was presented to him in the field by General Sir Herbert Plumer, but not gazetted until 17 September. The citation read:

Temporary Second Lieutenant Richard Michael Trevethan, General List and Royal Flying Corps.

"For conspicuous gallantry and devotion to duty when on offensive patrols. He has continuously displayed the greatest dash and determination in attacking enemy formations, regardless of their superiority in numbers, and has shot down at least four, driving others down out of control."

His squadron was then re-equipped with the new Bristol F.2 two-seater fighter, but on 18 September 1917, Trevethan was badly wounded. He returned to England to recover, and does not appear to have seen any further active service during the war.

=== List of aerial victories ===
Combat record
No.	Date/Time	Aircraft/ Serial No.	Opponent	Result	Location	Observer
1	2 June 1917 @ 0945	F.E.2d (A6480)	Albatros D.III	Destroyed	Gheluvelt	Air Mechanic 2nd Class John Cowell
2	9 June 1917 @ 0600	F.E.2d (A6341)	Albatros D.III	Destroyed in flames	East of Ploegsteert	Second Lieutenant M. Dudbridge
3	2 July 1917 @ 1245	F.E.2d (A6523)	Albatros D.III	Out of control	Comines-Houthem	Lieutenant Campbell Hoy
4	7 July 1917 @ 1900	F.E.2d (A6498)	Albatros D.III	Destroyed in flames	Wervicq	Lieutenant Campbell Hoy
5	12 July 1917 @ 1725	F.E.2d (A6528)	Albatros D.V	Destroyed in flames	East of Ploegsteert Wood	Private Arkley
6	17 July 1917 @ 1955	F.E.2d (A6512)	Albatros D.V	Destroyed	Ploegsteert Wood	Lieutenant Campbell Hoy
7	22 July 1917 @ 1650	F.E.2d (A6528)	Albatros D.V	Destroyed in flames	Menin–North of Wervicq	Lieutenant Campbell Hoy
8	27 July 1917 @ 1945–2045	F.E.2d (A6528)	Albatros D.V	Out of control	Lille–Menin	Lieutenant Campbell Hoy
9	28 July 1917 @ 0915	F.E.2d (A6528)	Albatros D.V	Out of control	Kezelbars	Lieutenant Campbell Hoy
10	8 August 1917 @ 1030–1040	F.E.2d (A6527)	Albatros D.V	Out of control	East of Messines	Lieutenant Campbell Hoy
11	8 August 1917 @ 1030–1040	F.E.2d (A6527)	Albatros D.V	Out of control	East of Messines	Lieutenant Campbell Hoy
12	9 August 1917 @ 0950	F.E.2d (A6527)	Albatros D.V	Out of control	Becelaere–Roulers	Lieutenant Campbell Hoy

== Post-war career ==
On 1 August 1919, Trevethan was granted a permanent commission as a flying officer in the Royal Air Force. On 22 December 1919, he received a mention in despatches while serving with the British "Syren Force" in Murmansk, northern Russia, during the Allied intervention in the Russian Civil War. He was also awarded the Order of St. Anna, 2nd class, by the Russians.

He then served in No. 207 Squadron RAF, receiving promotion to flight lieutenant in the 1922 New Year Honours. In September 1922 Trevethan was about to be reassigned to the RAF School of Photography, but this was cancelled, when No. 207 Squadron was sent to Turkey as a result of the Chanak Crisis. Trevethan, in command of the advance party, travelled from RAF Bircham Newton in Norfolk, to Liverpool, where the squadron and its aircraft were loaded onto the steamships Eboe and Khartoum, and sailed for Constantinople, arriving on 11 October. The squadron, under the command of Squadron Leader Arthur Tedder, had considerable difficulties unloading, reassembling, and operating their Airco DH.9A aircraft, due to the lack of facilities and the poor state of the airfield at San Stefano. However, the crisis was eventually settled by negotiation, and the squadron returned to England in August 1923, proceeding to its new home at RAF Eastchurch.

On 22 October 1923 Trevethan was posted to No. 39 Squadron, also flying the DH.9A, based at RAF Spitalgate, until reassigned to the RAF Depot at Uxbridge on 24 August 1925. On 21 September 1926 he was posted to the headquarters of Iraq Command, serving as Senior Meteorological Officer, until returning to the RAF Depot at Uxbridge on 26 January 1929. He was posted to No. 100 Squadron, based at RAF Bicester on 4 June 1929, and then from August 1931 until April 1933 (when it became 824 Naval Air Squadron) he commanded No. 440 (Fleet Reconnaissance) Flight, flying Fairey IIIF biplanes, and alternating between RAF Kai Tak, Hong Kong, and the carrier HMS Hermes, also receiving a promotion to squadron leader on 1 December 1932. He then commanded the Flying and Parachute Test Squadron at the RAF Home Aircraft Depot at RAF Henlow from November 1934 until retiring from the RAF on 1 June 1935. In 1937, he became Air Advisor to the Kwantung Government in China. During the Second World War, he was attached to the Admiralty, serving as mate and second officer in small Royal Navy ships.

Post-war he was made a Fellow of the Royal Meteorological Society, a Fellow of the Royal Geographical Society, and was for many years Superintendent of the Falmouth Meteorological Observatory.

Trevethan died on 30 December 1971, at the Royal Cornwall Hospital, Treliske, Truro.

== Personal life ==
In 1920 Trevethan married Muriel Doris Moon, the daughter of Major Wilfred Graham Moon, and granddaughter of Sir Edward Moon, but they were divorced in 1936. They had a son, Gerald Michael Trevethan.

== Bibliography ==
- Shores, Christopher F.; Franks, Norman & Guest, Russell F. (1990). Above the Trenches: a Complete Record of the Fighter Aces and Units of the British Empire Air Forces 1915–1920. London, UK: Grub Street. ISBN 978-0-948817-19-9.
