= Francis Cubbon =

British World War I flying ace (1892–1917)

Francis Richard Cubbon
- Born: 26 November 1892; London, England
- Died: 9 June 1917 (aged 24) near Warneton, France
- Burial place: Arras Flying Services Memorial, Pas de Calais, France
- Military career
- Allegiance: United Kingdom
- Branch: British Army
- Service years: 1911–1917
- Rank: Captain
- Nickname: Puddles
- Units: York and Lancaster Regiment; 72nd Punjabis; No. 20 Squadron RAF
- Awards: Military Cross & Bar

Captain Francis Richard Cubbon MC* (26 November 1892 – 9 June 1917) was an aerial observer and flying ace in the First World War. In conjunction with his pilots, he was credited with 21 aerial victories.

== Early life and service ==
Francis Richard Cubbon was the only surviving son of his parents' marriage. His father was Captain Richard Cubbon, a supply and transport officer of the Indian Army.

Cubbon was born in London, but spent most of his youth in Poona, India. The young Cubbon was educated at Alleyn's School and Dulwich College before attending and graduating from the Royal Military College, Sandhurst. He was posted to the Indian Army as a second lieutenant on 6 September 1911. His first assignment was to the York and Lancaster Regiment in Karachi. He subsequently was appointed to the 72nd Punjabis on the North-western Frontier of India, on 1 December 1912. He was promoted to lieutenant on 6 December 1913, and to captain on 6 September 1915. In November 1915, he was invalided home.

== Service in Royal Flying Corps ==
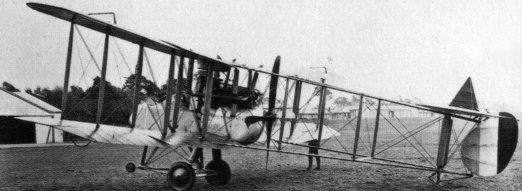
Rolls-Royce Eagle powered F.E.2d with nose-wheel.

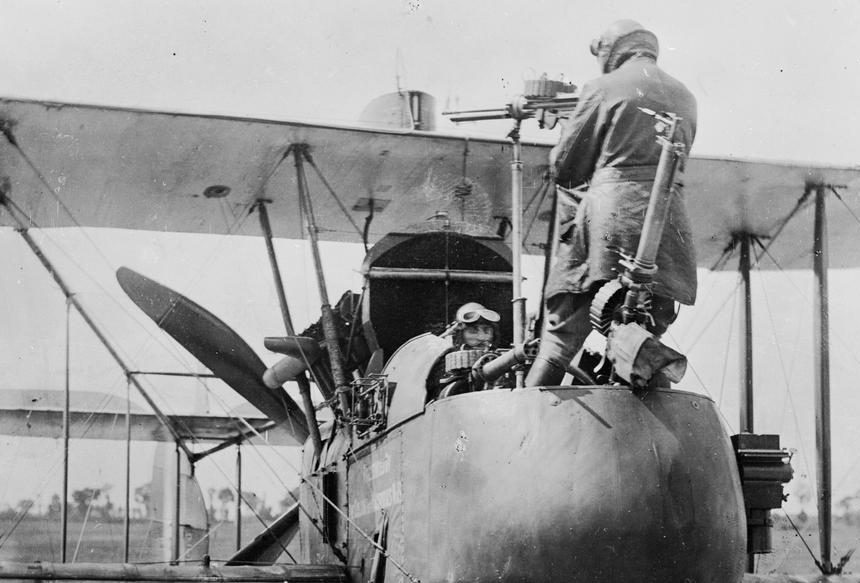
An F.E.2d observer demonstrating the use of the rear-firing Lewis gun, which required him to stand on his seat.

Like so many invalided and convalescent land soldiers of the First World War, Cubbon volunteered for flight duty and was accepted as an observer on 25 March 1917. By Bloody April, 1917, he was assigned to 20 Squadron as an observer in Royal Aircraft Factory F.E.2s. Frederick Libby, the United States of America's first ace, gave a vivid description of an observer's duties aboard the aircraft that was an incremental development of the pre-1914 Farman Experimental:

When you stood up to shoot, all of you from the knees up was exposed to the elements. There was no belt to hold you. Only your grip on the gun and the sides of the nacelle stood between you and eternity. Toward the front of the nacelle was a hollow steel rod with a swivel mount to which the gun was anchored. This gun covered a huge field of fire forward. Between the observer and the pilot a second gun was mounted, for firing over the F.E.2d's upper wing to protect the aircraft from rear attack ... Adjusting and shooting this gun required that you stand right up out of the nacelle with your feet on the nacelle coaming. You had nothing to worry about except being blown out of the aircraft by the blast of air or tossed out bodily if the pilot made a wrong move. There were no parachutes and no belts. No wonder they needed observers.

And Libby did not even mention the hazards of spilling overboard with a propeller chopping along behind the crew.

Cubbon scored two victories on 24 April 1917 with Lieutenant R. E. Johnson in F.E.2 number A6392. He then flew with Captain Frederick Thayre for the next six weeks and claimed some nineteen victories.

Seventeen of these were over German Albatros D.III single-seated fighters. Upon Captain Albert Ball's death on 7 May, Cubbon became the second ranking ace of the Royal Flying Corps.

== Killed in action ==
On 9 June, two days after scoring their final victory together, Cubbon and Thayre attacked an Albatros two-seater and sent it down in a smoking nose dive. They were then killed in action by a direct hit from anti-aircraft fire from K Flak Battery 60 near Warneton. A German message drop confirmed their deaths to the British authorities, but their graves remain undiscovered.

The nineteen victories shared included five Albatros D.IIIs shot down in flames and eleven destroyed, an Albatros reconnaissance two-seater in flames and another destroyed. Another D.III was claimed driven down 'out of control'. Cubbon also added his two victories with Johnson—a D.III destroyed and one 'out of control'.

Cubbon received both the Military Cross on 11 May and a Bar in lieu of a second award on the 16th, both being gazetted posthumously on 18 July 1918.

== Awards and decorations ==
Military Cross
Captain Francis Richard Cubbon. Indian Army, attached Royal Flying Corps.
For conspicuous gallantry and devotion to duty. He has shown great pluck and determination when acting as observer, on several occasions displaying fine marksmanship and coolness against superior numbers of the enemy.

Bar to the Military Cross
Captain Francis Richard Cubbon, MC. Indian Army, attached Royal Flying Corps.
For conspicuous gallantry and devotion to duty. When acting as an observer on an offensive patrol, he displayed great skill and courage against superior numbers of the enemy. Throughout the action he backed up his pilot with a remarkable display of marksmanship.
