= Frank Johnson (RAF airman) =

British flying ace (1896–1961)

- Born: 26 December 1896; Oldham, Lancashire, England
- Died: 1961 (aged 64–65); Oldham, Lancashire, England
- Military career
- Allegiance: United Kingdom
- Branch: British Army; Royal Air Force
- Rank: Sergeant
- Units: No. 22 Squadron RFC; No. 20 Squadron RFC; No. 62 Squadron RAF
- Awards: Distinguished Conduct Medal & Bar

Sergeant Frank Johnson DCM* (28 December 1896 – 1961) was a World War I flying ace credited with 16 aerial victories. He flew as both an observer/gunner and as a pilot, and is the only enlisted man to receive a second award of the Distinguished Conduct Medal.

== Biography ==
Johnson scored his first four victories between 24 September 1916 and 4 February 1917 while assigned to No. 22 Squadron. He flew in the front seat of four different F.E.2bs with four different pilots to do it. Johnson was awarded the Distinguished Conduct Medal on 26 April 1917. He then retrained as a pilot, receiving Royal Aero Club Aviator's Certificate No. 4531 on 21 April 1917, and returned to action as a member of No. 20 Squadron, which operated Bristol F.2 Fighters. He then scored nine more victories between 11 October 1917 and 17 February 1918, using four different gunners in the rear seat of the two-seat fighter.

He then transferred to No. 62 Squadron to score his last three victories, one on 27 March 1918, and the other two on 12 April. Once again, he was piloting Bristols, and he used two different gunners to score this last trio of triumphs. He was awarded a Bar to his DCM in lieu of a second award on 3 September 1918.

His final tally showed six enemy aircraft destroyed and ten driven down out of control.

== Awards and citations ==
Distinguished Conduct Medal
6391 Corporal (Acting Serjeant) F. Johnson, RFC.

"For conspicuous gallantry and devotion to duty as an observer. He was attacked by three hostile machines and shot one of them down. He has previously shot down three other machines."

Bar to the Distinguished Conduct Medal
6391 Serjeant F. Johnson, DCM, RAF.

"For conspicuous gallantry and devotion to duty in encounters with enemy aeroplanes, with the following results:— Attacked and crashed a Pfalz scout, drove down an Albatross out of control. On previous occasions he had destroyed four enemy aeroplanes and driven three down out of control."
