= Selden Long =

Selden Herbert Long
- Born: 6 October 1895; Aldershot, England
- Died: 12 December 1952 (aged 57); Cape Town, South Africa
- Military career
- Allegiance: United Kingdom
- Branch: British Army; Royal Air Force
- Service years: 1914–1919; 1939–1945
- Rank: Wing Commander
- Nickname: Tubby
- Units: Durham Light Infantry; No. 29 Squadron; No. 24 Squadron; No. 46 Squadron
- Commands: No. 111 Squadron
- Awards: Distinguished Service Order; Military Cross; Mentioned in dispatches five times
- Other work: Author of In the Blue

Wing Commander Selden Herbert Long DSO, MC (6 October 1895 – 12 December 1952), was an English flying ace during the First World War. He was credited with nine confirmed aerial victories. He was also noted for the audacity of his trench strafing missions–an early form of close air support.

He returned to service for the Second World War, serving until the war's end.

== Early service and award of the Military Cross ==
Long was the son of Major General Sidney Selden Long. He was educated at the United Services College at Windsor. He was originally commissioned as a second lieutenant in the Durham Light Infantry before being seconded to the Royal Flying Corps in 1914. He was awarded Royal Aero Club Aviators' Certificate No. 1046 on 25 January 1915 after soloing a Maurice Farman biplane at the Military School, Brooklands, and was appointed a flying officer on 26 March.

Even before scoring an aerial victory, he won the Military Cross, which was gazetted on 29 October 1915. His citation tells the tale:

Second Lieutenant Selden Herbert Long, The Durham Light Infantry and Royal Flying Corps.

"For conspicuous gallantry on several occasions, notably the following:
"On 10 September 1915, he went out to attack an observation balloon shed with a 100-lb. bomb, but, being heavily fired at by an anti-aircraft battery, he silenced the guns with this bomb and returned for another one, with which he attacked the balloon. He only narrowly missed it as it was being deflated beside the shed.
"On 23 September he made two determined attacks on trains from 500 feet, breaking the rails in two places. On the first occasion he returned to the attack three times, and finally climbed to 1,000 feet in order to make better use of his bomb sight; on the second occasion he made most of his return journey at 1,000 feet in order better to examine villages, roads, etc.
"On 25 September he attacked a train at 500 feet under heavy rifle fire, and damaged the line. Late in the afternoon of 25 September he heard that trains were moving at 25 miles distance, and, in spite of darkness and bad weather, he volunteered to attack them. Heavy rain prevented his reaching them, so he turned to attack Peronne station, descending to 500 feet and coming under heavy anti-aircraft gun fire. This fire prevented his reaching the station, but he climbed to 1,500 feet and attacked a "Rocket" battery, silencing one of its guns."

By December 1915, Long was back in England, serving as an instructor, based in Erdington.

== Aerial victories ==
Long was appointed a flight commander with the rank of temporary captain on 1 February 1916. It was almost six months before Long had his first aerial win, using one of No. 29 Squadron's DH.2s to drive a Fokker Eindekker down out of control on 6 August 1916. Three months later, on 16 November, flying a DH.2 for No. 24 Squadron, he captured a Roland C.II at Beaulencourt. There followed a string of four victories in December; on the 11th, teamed with Eric Pashley, Chester Stairs Duffus and another pilot, he destroyed an Albatros D.I; on the 20th, he and Kelvin Crawford set an Albatros D.II aflame; the 26th and 27th saw "out of control" victories.

On 25 January 1917, Long torched an LVG two-seater from FA(A) 216; its crew, Leutnants Gunter Kallenbach and Ernst Erdmann, leapt to their deaths. Two days later, the two-seater falling before Long's guns belonged to FA(A) 233, and the men killed were Vizefeldwebel Willy Lang and Leutnant Kurt Brandt. Long scored once more, on 6 March 1917. Six days later, Long was awarded the Distinguished Service Order. His citation read:

Lieutenant (Temporary Captain) Selden Herbert Long, MC, Durham Light Infantry and Royal Flying Corps.

For great skill and daring in piloting his machine. He shot down an enemy machine, which fell in our lines, and the same day he forced another hostile machine to land in the enemy's lines. Later, he shot down another enemy machine, which fell in our lines.

He was also mentioned in dispatches five times.

Long returned to England as a squadron commander in early 1917, but took a demotion to return to combat duty as a flight commander on 5 July. He later rose to acting command of that squadron, No. 46 Squadron RFC, in August.

On 15 September 1917, Long was appointed an acting-major. He had a short posting with a training squadron, No. 28 Squadron RFC. Then he was transferred to the Middle East to command No. 111 Squadron RFC.

== Post First World War ==
After the war's end, Long stayed in to fly Sopwith Pups in No. 46 Squadron. He then moved on to command No. 111 Squadron in the Middle East. On 31 July 1919, Long resigned his RAF commission, and was granted the rank of major. His book of memoirs, In the Blue, was published in 1920. He remained a reserve officer in the Durham Light Infantry until 10 May 1924.

In March 1937, he married Marion Beatrice Smith, the ex-wife of William Lever, 2nd Viscount Leverhulme.

Long returned to military service in the Administrative and Special Duties Branch of the Royal Air Force Volunteer Reserve during the Second World War. He was promoted from squadron leader to wing commander on 15 September 1942, relinquishing his commission "on cessation of duty" on 10 September 1945.

Selden Herbert Long died on 12 December 1952.

== Publications ==
- Long, S. H. (1920). In the Blue. London: John Lane.
- Long, S. H. (1927). Navigational Wireless. London: Chapman & Hall.
