= Lancelot Richardson =

Australian flying ace during World War I

Lancelot Lytton Richardson
- Born: 18 October 1895; Young, New South Wales, Australia
- Died: 13 April 1917 (aged 21)
- Burial place: Thelus, Pas de Calais, France
- Military career
- Allegiance: British Empire
- Branch: Cavalry; aviation
- Service years: 1914–1917
- Rank: Captain
- Units: 6th Light Horse Regiment AIF, 25 Squadron
- Awards: Military Cross

Captain Lancelot Lytton Richardson (18 October 1895 – 13 April 1917) was an Australian flying ace during World War I. He was credited with seven confirmed aerial victories before his death in action on 13 April 1917.

== Early life and service ==
Lancelot Lytton Richardson was born on 18 October 1895, to Elizabeth Greedy Parkman and George Richardson. He may have been born in Young, New South Wales, or in Bereen Barraba.

Richardson attended North Shore Church of England Grammar School, where he was active in sports. He was captain of both the football and boxing teams, as well as the stroke oar at crew.

When Lancelot Lytton Richardson enlisted in the 6th Light Horse Regiment on 24 September 1914, he completed an Attestation Paper that started his military records. On his attestation, he listed his birthplace as Young, New South Wales, Australia, his age as 19, his occupation as "grazier", and his mother, Elizebeth Greedy Richardson, as his next of kin. His mother was not widowed, though there was no mention of Richardson's father. Despite his youth, Lancelot Richardson had been involved in some minor legal trouble in Barraba, New South Wales. Nevertheless, he was accepted for service.

== Flying service ==
Serjeant Richardson was commissioned a Temporary Second Lieutenant in the Royal Flying Corps on 28 December 1915. Appointment as a Flying Officer followed, on 16 May 1916. He was assigned to No. 25 Squadron RFC on 3 June to fly a Royal Aircraft Factory FE.2b pusher. Two weeks later, he and his observer teamed with two other FE.2 crews to drive a Fokker Eindekker down out of control for Richardson's first victory. Nine days later, on 26 June, Richardson had Leslie Court aboard as observer/gunner when they forced another Eindekker to land. On 2 July, Richardson forced an Albatros two-seater reconnaissance plane to land. Then, on 20 July, with Court manning the guns, Richardson teamed with another British aircrew to destroy one Eindekker and drive another down out of control; he was now an ace, but was wounded in the process.

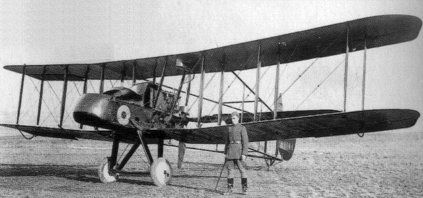
F.E.2b such as Richardson flew.

Richardson was promoted to Temporary Captain on 1 January 1917, and returned to combat duty in early 1917 as a flight leader in the same squadron. With William Meggitt manning the guns, Richardson drove a German two-seater out of control on 15 February 1917. On 17 March 1917, he capped his career as an ace by sharing in the destruction of an Albatros D.II. On 13 April 1917, Richardson fell to his death under the guns of Hans Klein of Jasta 4. On 11 May 1917, he was awarded the Military Cross.
