= Campbell Hoy =

British flying ace (1893–1985)

Campbell Alexander Hoy
- Born: 13 February 1893; South Shields, Durham, England
- Died: 9 March 1985 (aged 92); Surrey, England
- Military career
- Allegiance: England
- Branch: Royal Flying Corps; Royal Air Force
- Service years: 1914 – 1946
- Rank: Group Captain
- Unit: No. 20 Squadron RAF
- Awards: Military Cross

Group Captain Campbell Alexander Hoy (13 February 1893 – 9 March 1985) was a British flying ace during the First World War, credited with eleven aerial victories. He remained in the Royal Air Force post-war and served through the end of the Second World War.

== Early life ==
Campbell Alexander Hoy was born to Henry Hoy, a chemist, and Margaret Anne Reid, in Newbiggin-by-the-Sea. He was living there in Campbell House during 1901. He attended Armstrong College, Newcastle, then a part of the University of Durham, from 1913 onwards. On 15 January 1915, Cadet Lance-Corporal Hoy from the Durham University Contingent of the Officers Training Corps was commissioned as a second lieutenant in the Northern Cyclist Battalion.

== Aerial service in the First World War ==
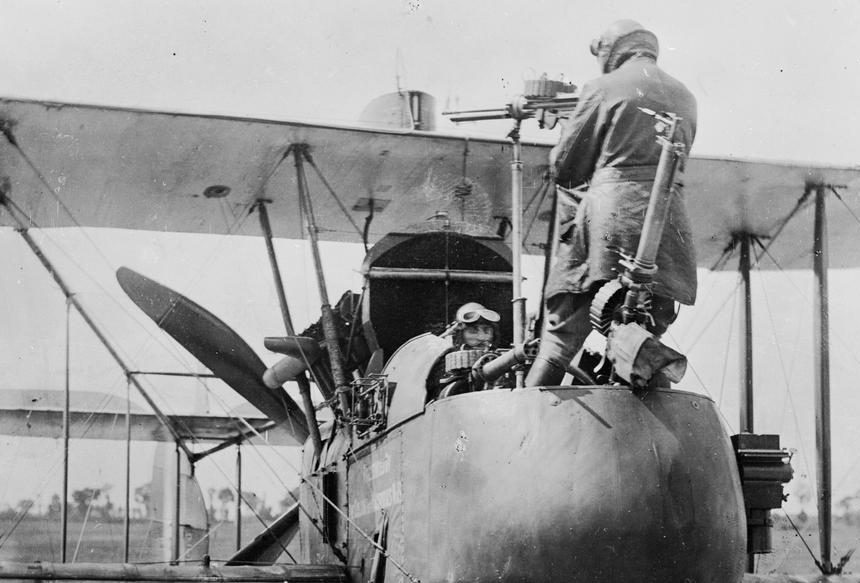
An observer (back to camera) in a Royal Aircraft Factory FE2d demonstrates defence against rear attacks.

On 16 May 1917, he was seconded to the Royal Flying Corps (RFC) as a flying officer (observer). Both he and his pilot were injured when their aircraft, Royal Aircraft Factory FE.2d s/n A6366, was shot down by German ace August Hanko of Jagdstaffel 28 on 25 May 1917. Hoy began his victory string over German Albatros D.V fighters on 29 June 1917. His next nine wins manning the guns in a Royal Aircraft Factory FE.2d came while he was teamed with Richard M. Trevethan. His last win was scored with Arthur Solly as his pilot, on the evening of 9 July 1918. Hoy's final tally was five Albatros D.V fighters destroyed and six driven down out of control. (Note: Note that the 9 July victory shown here with Hoy as observer is different from the 9 July victory credited on Hoy's record. The former is Hoy's tenth victory; the latter is his eleventh.)

On 25 August 1917, Hoy was promoted to lieutenant, with seniority from 1 June 1916. As of 14 December 1917, he was appointed an assistant instructor in gunnery and classified as a 3rd class equipment officer. On 23 January 1918, he was reclassified as a 2nd class equipment officer.

== Between the world wars ==
On 7 January 1919, he was appointed temporary captain, effective 25 October 1918, in the Technical Branch. On 19 May 1919, he was selected to remain seconded as captain in the RFC, with seniority from 6 November 1918. On 1 August 1919, he surrendered his commission in the Cyclist Battalion and gained a permanent commission as captain in the Royal Air Force.

On 2 September 1920, Hoy married Ena Olive Ball in Ickenham. The union would produce two children—Ena Bertha Margaret Hoy and Campbell Henry Alfred Hoy.

On 1 January 1926, Hoy was promoted from flying officer to flight lieutenant. On 7 February 1935, he was selected for retention through age 45. On 1 January 1936, he was again promoted, to squadron leader. A further promotion to wing commander followed on 1 January 1939.

== Second World War and beyond ==
On 24 April 1940, Wing Commander Hoy was transferred to the Technical Branch, with a promotion to group captain.

On 13 February 1946, Hoy retired.

== Military Cross citation ==
Second Lieutenant (Temporary Lieutenant) Campbell Alexander Hoy, RFC.

"For conspicuous gallantry and devotion to duty when acting as observer on offensive patrols. On four occasions he has shot down hostile scouts, displaying in every instance splendid determination and a very fine offensive spirit."

== Bibliography ==
- Franks, Norman; Guest, Russell; Alegi, Gregory (1997). Above the War Fronts: the British Two-seater Bomber Pilot and Observer Aces, the British Two-seater Fighter Observer Aces, and the Belgian, Italian, Austro-Hungarian and Russian Fighter Aces, 1914-1918: Volume 4 of Fighting Airmen of WWI Series: Volume 4 of Air Aces of WWI. Grub Street. ISBN 189869-756-6 ISBN 978-1-89869-756-5
- Guttman, Jon & Dempsey, Harry (2009). Pusher Aces of World War I. Osprey Publishing. ISBN 978-1-84603-417-6.
