= Charles Woollven =

British soldier

Charles Henry Chapman Woollven
- Born: 28 June 1897; Folkestone, Kent, England
- Died: 7 January 1971 (aged 73)
- Military career
- Allegiance: United Kingdom
- Branch: British Army; Royal Flying Corps; Royal Air Force
- Service years: 1916–1947
- Rank: Group captain
- Units: Devonshire Regiment; No. 25 Squadron RFC
- Conflicts: World War I • Western Front; World War II
- Awards: Order of the British Empire; Military Cross

Group Captain Charles Henry Chapman Woollven OBE, MC (28 June 1897 – 7 January 1971) was a British professional soldier who began his military career during World War I. He became a flying ace credited with five aerial victories while piloting a two-seater FE.2b into combat. Postwar, he remained in the Royal Air Force, rising through the officer's ranks while holding increasingly more important posts during the 1920s and 1930s. By 1938, on the eve of World War II, he was a wing commander. Promoted to the rank of group captain by war's end, he retired in 1947.

== Personal details ==
Charles Henry Chapman Woollven was born on 28 June 1897; his birthplace is given as either Plymouth, England, or Folkestone.

On 6 August 1925, he married Ariel Gwynnedd Alice Jeffery at Holy Trinity, Paddington.

== World War I ==
On 26 January 1916, Woollven was commissioned from the Royal Military College, Sandhurst as a second lieutenant in the Devonshire Regiment. He was promptly seconded to the Royal Flying Corps to begin his flight training, being granted Royal Aero Club Aviator's Certificate No. 2636 on 31 March, and was appointed a flying officer on 27 May. He joined No. 25 Squadron RFC on 19 June 1916 to fly a F.E.2b two-seater. He scored his first victory on 8 August, driving down a Roland C.II out of control.

Woollven was awarded the Military Cross, which was gazetted on 14 November 1916. His citation read:

Second Lieutenant Charles Henry Chapman Woollven, Devonshire Regiment and Royal Flying Corps.

"For conspicuous gallantry in action. He dived down to a low altitude, attacked a train, causing many casualties, and displayed great courage and determination throughout."

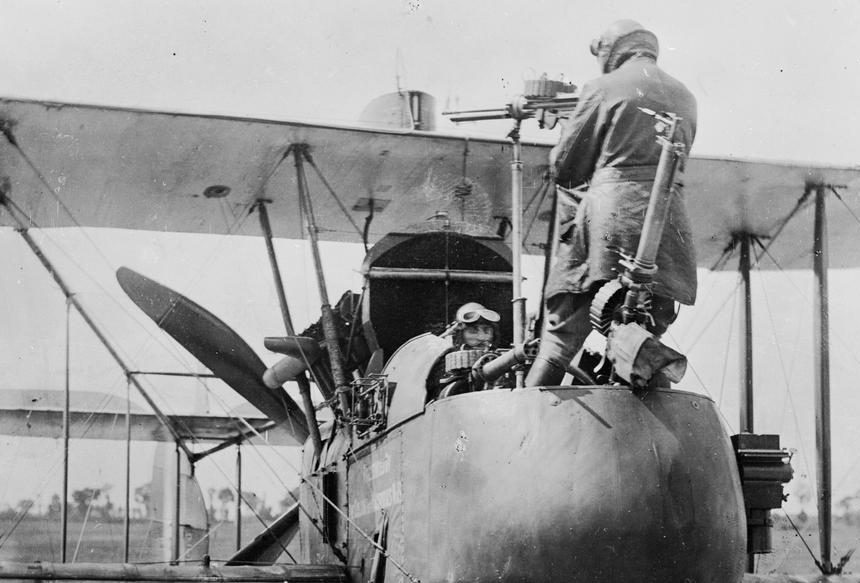
Royal Aircraft Factory FE.2, with gunner and pilot.

He quickly followed this with more aerial victories, destroying two Albatros D.I fighters, on 16 and 23 November. He was appointed a flight commander with the temporary rank of captain on 31 December 1916. On 17 March 1917 he drove down out of control an Albatros D.II fighter, and on 1 May he destroyed an Albatros D.III for his fifth victory. On 26 July 1917 Woollven was promoted to lieutenant.

=== List of aerial victories ===
| No. | Date/Time | Aircraft/ Serial No. | Opponent | Result | Location | Notes |
|---|---|---|---|---|---|---|
| 1 | 8 August 1916 @ 0640 | F.E.2b (6991) | Roland C.II | Out of control | Don | Observer: Lieutenant C. Nelson. |
| 2 | 16 November 1916 @ 1300 | F.E.2b (7024) | Albatros D.I | Destroyed | Somain | Observer: Second Lieutenant C. H. Marchant. |
| 3 | 23 November 1916 @ 1545 | F.E.2b (7024) | Albatros D.I | Destroyed | East of Oppy | Observer: Sergeant G. R. Horrocks. |
| 4 | 17 March 1917 @ 1100–1130 | F.E.2b (A5484) | Albatros D.II | Out of control | Oppy—Beaumont | Observer: Sergeant J. H. Booth. |
| 5 | 1 May 1917 @ 1800 | F.E.2b (7003) | Albatros D.III | Destroyed | South-east of Fresnoy | Observer: Sergeant J. H. Booth. |

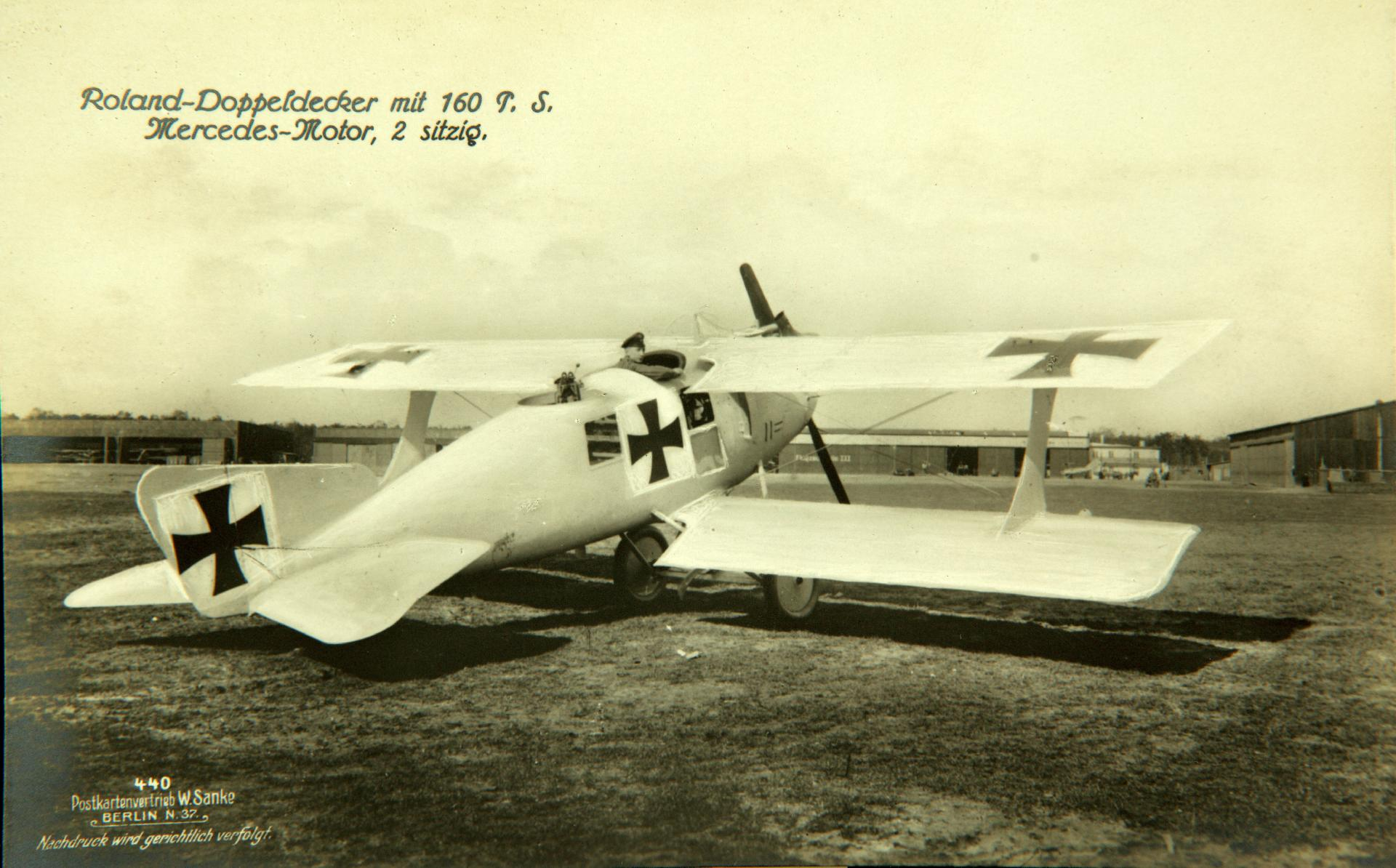
A Roland C.II was Woolven's first victim.

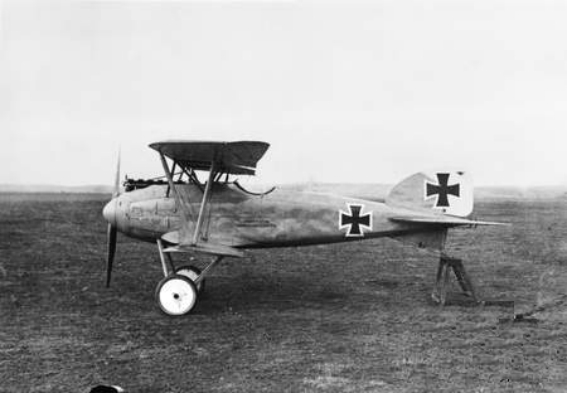
An Albatros D.III German fighter was Woolven's final victim.

== Inter-war career ==
On 20 January 1919 Woollven was transferred to the RAF's Administrative Branch, and was granted a permanent commission in the RAF as a captain on 1 August 1919. He served first overseas, as he was posted to the RAF Depot on transfer to the Home Establishment on 21 October 1923. He served at the Inland Area Aircraft Depot at RAF Henlow from 14 January 1924.

On 1 January 1931, he was promoted to squadron leader, and on 8 April was posted to No. 4 Flying Training School at RAF Abu Sueir in Egypt, where he remained until 10 October 1933. Placed on half pay, he was reactivated on 22 June 1934, and posted to No. 2 Flying Training School at RAF Digby for administrative duties on 10 November, then to the RAF Record Office at RAF West Ruislip on 11 August 1938. On 29 November 1938 he was promoted to wing commander.

== World War II and beyond ==
On 11 June 1942 in the King's Birthday Honours, Woollven, now an acting group captain, was made an Officer of the Order of the British Empire. He was promoted to the temporary rank of group captain on 1 January 1943, and eventually retired on 15 September 1947 retaining that rank.

Charles Henry Chapman Woollven died on 7 January 1971.
