= John Cowell (RAF airman) =

Irish soldier, airman and flying ace

John J. Cowell
- Born: 1889; Limerick, Ireland
- Died: 30 July 1918 (aged 28–29) near Ypres, Belgium
- Burial place: Longuenesse Souvenir Cemetery, Saint-Omer, France; 50°43′50.5″N 2°15′01.8″E
- Military career
- Allegiance: United Kingdom
- Branch: British Army; Royal Air Force
- Rank: Sergeant
- Units: Royal Engineers; No. 20 Squadron RAF
- Awards: Distinguished Conduct Medal; Military Medal & Bar

John J. Cowell, DCM, MM & Bar (1889 – 30 July 1918) was an Irish soldier, airman and flying ace of the First World War. He was credited with sixteen aerial victories; fifteen of these were gained as an observer/gunner and one as a pilot, before he was killed in action.

== Early life and background ==
Cowell was born in Limerick, one of ten children of Michael and Kate Cowell.

== First World War ==
Cowell first served in the 12th Field Company of the Royal Engineers, where on 27 October 1916 Sapper (Acting Corporal) Cowell was awarded his first Military Medal.

Cowell then transferred to the Royal Flying Corps, joining No. 20 Squadron as an observer/gunner during Bloody April 1917. He manned the guns of a F.E.2d fighter for such other aces as Richard M. Trevethan, Cecil Roy Richards, Reginald Condon, and Oliver Vickers. Between 5 May and 28 July 1917, Cowell gained fifteen victories, destroying a German two-seater reconnaissance aircraft and five German fighters, and driving down nine more German fighters out of control. He was promoted to sergeant, and awarded the Distinguished Conduct Medal, which was gazetted on 17 July 1917. His citation read:

78171 Sergeant J. Cowell, RFC. For conspicuous gallantry whilst assisting an aerial gunner during bomb raids. He showed remarkable skill and judgment in the eight combats in which he has been engaged, and on several occasions has shot down hostile aircraft.

On 14 September 1917 Cowell received a Bar to his Military Medal. He then returned to the Home Establishment for flight training, rejoining No. 20 Squadron as a pilot in mid-1918.

On 29 July 1918, while flying a Bristol F.2b, Cowell drove down a Fokker D.VII, his last, and only aerial victory as a pilot. He was killed in action the following day, shot down by Friedrich Ritter von Röth of Jasta 16. Cowell is buried in Longuenesse Souvenir Cemetery, Saint-Omer, France.

== List of aerial victories ==
Combat record
No.	Date/Time	Aircraft/ Serial No.	Opponent	Result	Location	Notes
1	5 May 1917 @ 1710	F.E.2d (A6400)	Albatros D.III	Out of control	Poelcapelle	Pilot: Second Lieutenant Reginald Conder
2	13 May 1917 @ 1040	F.E.2d (A6412)	Two-seater	Destroyed	Rekkem Airfield	Pilot: Second Lieutenant M. P. Scott
3	20 May 1917 @ 0920	F.E.2d (A6412)	Albatros D.III	Out of control	Menen	Pilot: Second Lieutenant Reginald Conder
4	25 May 1917 @ 0850	F.E.2d (A6415)	Albatros D.III	Out of control	Wervik	Pilot: Second Lieutenant Reginald Conder
5	26 May 1917 @ 1030	F.E.2d (A6415)	Albatros D.III	Out of control	Comines	Pilot: Second Lieutenant Reginald Conder
6	26 May 1917 @ 2010	F.E.2d (A6415)	Albatros D.III	Destroyed in flames	South-east of Ypres	Pilot: Second Lieutenant Reginald Conder
7	2 June 1917 @ 0945	F.E.2d (A6415)	Albatros D.III	Destroyed	Gheluvelt	Pilot: Second Lieutenant Richard M. Trevethan
8	29 June 1917 @ 1610	F.E.2d (A6376)	Albatros D.V	Out of control	Becelaère	Pilot: Second Lieutenant Oliver Vickers
9	12 July 1917 @ 1700–1715	F.E.2d (A6376)	Albatros D.V	Destroyed	East of Ploegsteert Wood	Pilot: Second Lieutenant Oliver Vickers
10	12 July 1917 @ 1700–1715	F.E.2d (A6376)	Albatros D.V	Out of control	East of Ploegsteert Wood	Pilot: Second Lieutenant Oliver Vickers
11	17 July 1917 @ 1945–1950	F.E.2d (A6468)	Albatros D.V	Destroyed in flames	Polygon Wood	Pilot: Lieutenant Cecil Richards
12	17 July 1917 @ 1945–1950	F.E.2d (A6468)	Albatros D.V	Destroyed	28Q 28	Pilot: Lieutenant Cecil Richards
13	20 July 1917 @ 0955	F.E.2d (A6376)	Albatros D.V	Out of control	Wervik	Pilot: Second Lieutenant Oliver Vickers
14	22 July 1917 @ 1650	F.E.2d (A6376)	Albatros D.V	Out of control	Menen—Wervik	Pilot: Second Lieutenant Oliver Vickers
15	28 July 1917 @ 1845	F.E.2d (A6376)	Albatros D.V	Out of control	East of Messines	Pilot: Second Lieutenant Oliver Vickers
16	29 July 1918 @ 2010	Bristol F.2b (E2471)	Fokker D.VII	Out of control	North-west of Wervicq	Observer: Corporal Charles William Hill
