= Vickers VIM =

VIM
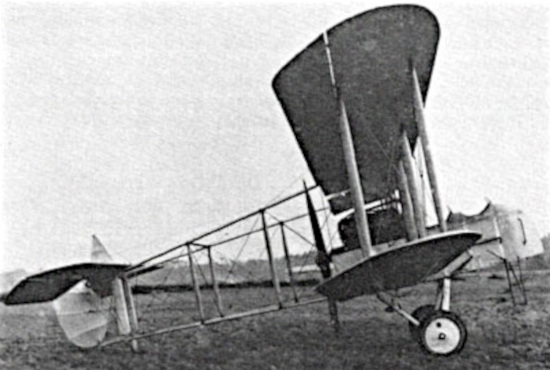

General information
- Type: Trainer
- National origin: United Kingdom
- Manufacturer: Vickers
- Primary user: Republic of China
- Number built: 35

History
- Introduction date: 1920
- Developed from: Royal Aircraft Factory F.E.2

The VIM or Vickers Instructional Machine was a trainer biplane aircraft built for the Republic of China by Vickers from war-surplus stocks of Royal Aircraft Factory F.E.2d parts, powered by a surplus Rolls-Royce Eagle engine, but fitted with an entirely new nacelle, providing dual controls for the pupil and instructor. Thirty-five were built and supplied from 1920.

== Operators ==
China

== Specifications (VIM) ==
Data from Vickers Aircraft since 1908

General characteristics

- Crew: 2
- Length: 32 ft 4 in (9.86 m)
- Wingspan: 47 ft 8 in (14.53 m)
- Height: 12 ft 4 in (3.76 m)
- Wing area: 488 sq ft (45.3 m^{2})
- Empty weight: 2,950 lb (1,338 kg)
- Gross weight: 3,654 lb (1,657 kg)
- Powerplant: 1 × Rolls-Royce Eagle VIII liquid-cooled V12 engine, 360 hp (270 kW)

Performance

- Maximum speed: 100 mph (160 km/h, 87 kn)
- Endurance: 2 3/4 hr
- Service ceiling: 13,000 ft (4,000 m)
- Time to altitude: 8.25 min to 6,000 ft (1,800 m)
