= Guy Reid =

British World War I flying ace

Guy Patrick Spence Reid
- Born: 18 May 1897; Puerto de la Cruz, Tenerife, Canary Islands, Spain
- Died: 16 October 1917 (aged 20); Lincolnshire, England
- Burial place: Newport Cemetery, Lincoln; 53°14′27″N 0°32′03″W
- Military career
- Allegiance: United Kingdom
- Branch: British Army
- Service years: 1915–1917
- Rank: Captain
- Units: Seaforth Highlanders; No. 20 Squadron RFC
- Conflicts: World War I • Western Front
- Awards: Military Cross

Captain Guy Patrick Spence Reid MC (18 May 1897 – 16 October 1917) was a British World War I flying ace credited with five aerial victories.

== Biography ==
Reid was born in Puerto de la Cruz, Tenerife, the son of Thomas Miller Reid and his wife Lisette (née Livings). His father was the British Vice-Consul there.

After passing out from the Royal Military College, Sandhurst, he was commissioned as a second lieutenant in the Seaforth Highlanders (Ross-shire Buffs, The Duke of Albany's) regiment on 11 August 1915. Reid was granted Royal Aero Club Aviators' Certificate No. 1693 on 4 September, after soloing a Maurice Farman biplane at the Military School, Farnborough, and on 21 October he was appointed a flying officer, seconded to the Royal Flying Corps.

Reid was sent to France in January 1916, to serve in No. 20 Squadron RFC. He gained his first aerial victory on 7 February, when he won the first clash between a Fokker Eindekker and the FE.2b by driving off the German aircraft with a smoking engine. By 6 September, he had run his score up to five, becoming one of the 44 aces that would serve in No. 20 Squadron during the war.

He was awarded the Military Cross on 26 September, and on 30 October he was appointed a flight commander with the temporary rank of captain. In December he returned to England to serve as a flying instructor at an RFC base in Lincolnshire, and was promoted to lieutenant on 1 January 1917.

On 16 October 1917, while instructing Second Lieutenant Cameron of Aberdeen, their aircraft crashed from a height of 900 feet (270 m) and both men were killed. He was, at the time, engaged to Miss Margaret Sheldon of Chelmsford. He is buried in Newport Cemetery, Lincoln.

== Honours and awards ==
Military Cross
Second Lieutenant Guy Patrick Spence Reid, Seaforth Highlanders and Royal Flying Corps.

"For conspicuous skill and gallantry on many occasions. Capt. Dixon-Spain, with 2nd Lt. Reid as pilot, attacked and drove back a hostile machine. A few minutes later four hostile machines were seen, three of which were attacked one after another and driven back, the fourth being accounted for by another patrol. Another time they attacked two hostile machines, shot down one and drove the other back. Two days later they attacked two more machines, of which one is believed to have been destroyed, the other being pursued back to its aerodrome."
