= Frederick Thayre =

British flying ace (1894–1917)

Frederick James Harry Thayre
- Born: 20 October 1894; London, England
- Died: 9 June 1917 (aged 22); Warneton, France
- Burial place: Arras Flying Services Memorial, Pas de Calais, France
- Military career
- Allegiance: United Kingdom
- Branch: Royal Flying Corps
- Service years: 1915–1917
- Rank: Captain
- Units: No. 16 Squadron RFC; No. 20 Squadron RFC
- Conflicts: World War I; Western Front
- Awards: Military Cross & Bar

Captain Frederick James Harry Thayre MC* (20 October 1894 – 9 June 1917) was a British two-seater flying ace in World War I who, in conjunction with his observer-gunners, was credited with twenty aerial victories.

== Background ==
Thayre was born in London on 20 October 1894. He lived in Littlehampton, Sussex, before the war.

== World War I service ==
Thayre learned to fly as a civilian, being granted Royal Aero Club Aviators' Certificate No. 1478 on 29 July 1915, after soloing a Maurice Farman biplane at the Military School at Brooklands, and was commissioned as a second lieutenant (on probation) in the Royal Flying Corps the same day. On completion of his military flight training he was appointed a flying officer on 29 December 1915, and was confirmed in his rank on 12 January 1916.

Thayre first flew operationally with No. 16 Squadron RFC in France, in B.E.2 two-seater aircraft, gaining his first victory on 18 March 1916 when his observer, Lieutenant C. R. Davidson, shot down an attacking German Fokker E.III fighter aircraft. On 30 April he received a mention in despatches for his "gallant and distinguished conduct in the field" from General Sir Douglas Haig, the Commander-in-Chief (C-in-C) of the British Expeditionary Force (BEF) in France. On 10 July, Thayre was appointed a flight commander with the temporary rank of captain, and on 1 September, he was promoted to the substantive rank of lieutenant.

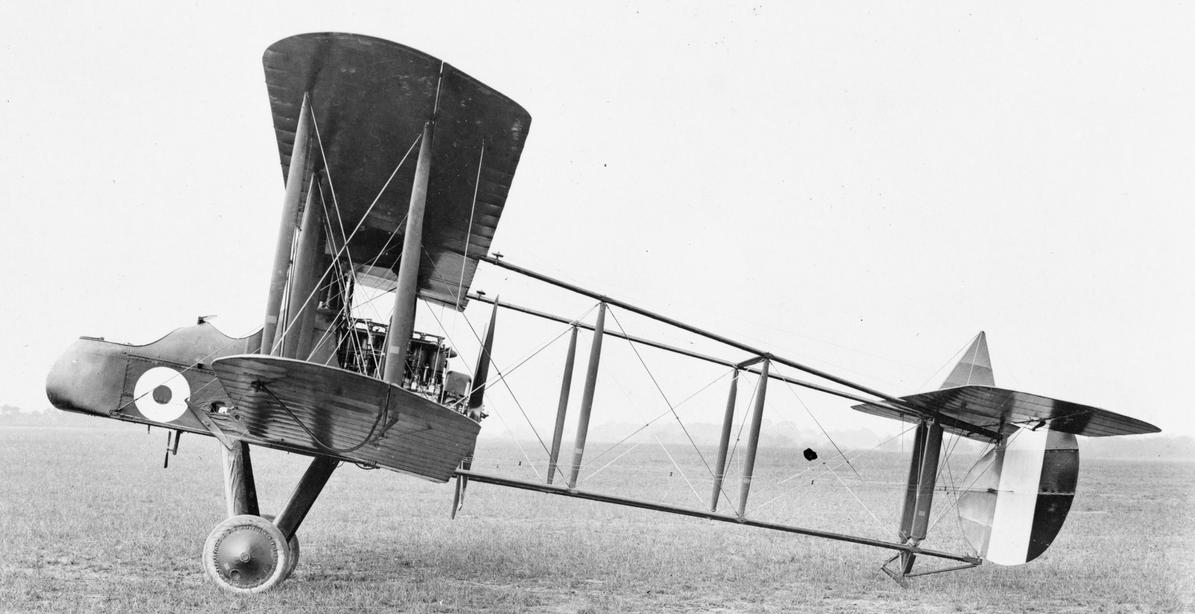
F.E.2d in profile

Thayre was later posted to No. 20 Squadron, flying F.E.2d aircraft. He teamed up with Francis Cubbon, with whom he claimed two victories on 29 April 1917. On 1 May, the duo shot down an Albatros two-seater of FA 6, killing its crew of two, while on 3 May 1917 Thayre and Cubbon engaged twenty-six Albatros D.III scouts, claiming two enemy aircraft shot down. At last, having exhausted their machine gun ammunition in that fight, Thayre and Cubbon used their automatic pistols as weapons of last resort.

They would score fifteen victories together during the course of May 1917. When Britain's leading ace, Albert Ball crashed to his death on 7 May, Thayre found himself lagging only his own gunner, Cubbon, and Billy Bishop in the ace race of the Royal Flying Corps.

== Killed in action ==
On 7 June, Thayre and Cubbon shot down and killed the five-victory ace Leutnant Weissner of Jasta 18. On 9 June 1917, their F.E.2d aircraft, No. A6430, received a direct hit from anti-aircraft fire from K Flak Battery 60 near Warneton and both men were killed.

The nineteen victories they shared included five D.IIIs shot down in flames, eleven destroyed, an Albatros C reconnaissance two-seater set afire, and another destroyed. Another D.III was driven down out of control. To that, Thayre added his victory with Davidson—a Fokker E.III fighter destroyed.

Along with his gunner Cubbon, Thayre was posthumously awarded the Military Cross, and a Bar in lieu of a second award, on 18 July 1917.

== Honours and awards ==
Military Cross
Lieutenant (temporary Captain) Frederick James Harry Thayre, Royal Flying Corps, Special Reserve.

"For conspicuous gallantry and devotion to duty. He has consistently displayed great dash and skill and determination when acting as a pilot in bombing raids. His fine offensive spirit and determination to close with the enemy has set a splendid example to his squadron."

Bar to Military Cross
Lieutenant (temporary Captain) Frederick James Harry Thayre, MC, Royal Flying Corps, Special Reserve.

"For conspicuous gallantry and devotion to duty. When in command of an offensive patrol he showed fine leadership and skill, being personally responsible for bringing down three hostile machines. His coolness and courage enabled his small command to inflict severe losses on numerically superior forces."

== Bibliography ==
- Greenhous, Brereton (2002). The Making of Billy Bishop: The First World War Exploits of Billy Bishop, VC. Dundurn Press Ltd. ISBN 978-1-55002-390-9.
- Guttman, Jon & Dempsey, Harry (2009). Pusher Aces of World War I. Osprey Publishing. ISBN 978-1-84603-417-6.
- Shores, Christopher F.; Franks, Norman & Guest, Russell F. (1990). Above the Trenches: a Complete Record of the Fighter Aces and Units of the British Empire Air Forces 1915–1920. London, UK: Grub Street. ISBN 978-0-948817-19-9.
