= James Robert Smith (RAF officer) =

- Born: 8 May 1891; Harray, Orkney Islands, Scotland
- Died: Unknown
- Military career
- Allegiance: Canada; United Kingdom
- Branch: Royal Flying Corps
- Service years: 1915 - 1919
- Rank: Second lieutenant
- Units: No. 18 Squadron RAF; No. 33 Squadron RAF; No. 51 Squadron RAF; No. 78 Squadron RAF
- Awards: French Croix de Guerre

Second lieutenant James Robert Smith (born 18 May 1891, date of death unknown) was a World War I flying ace credited with five aerial victories.

== Early life ==
Smith was Scots born, but emigrated to Prince Edward, Saskatchewan, Canada in 1910, when in his late teens. He worked there as a mechanical and electrical engineer until 1912. In 1913, he started his own business in Regina, Saskatchewan, and ran it until he returned to the United Kingdom after the outbreak of war in the latter months of 1914. On 20 January 1915, James Robert Smith went to Ottawa and volunteered for military service. His Canadian Attestation Papers gives his next of kin as his father, James B. Smith. The younger Smith claimed to be in a Regina militia unit. Physical examination showed him to be five feet seven inches tall, with light brown hair and eyes and fair complexion.

== Aerial service ==
Once in, he served as an observer/gunner in the Royal Aircraft Factory FE.2bs of 18 Squadron. He scored his first aerial victory on the day after Christmas 1916, when he drove down an Albatros D.II out of control over Vélu, France. On 6 April 1917, he scored his fifth victory over an Albatros D.II, having destroyed one, captured one, and driven three down out of control. Five days later, a stomach wound suffered in action removed him from duty. He recovered to serve in three Home Defence Squadrons during 1918. On 6 August 1918, he injured his left eye. He came back from that wound to serve in 78 squadron. He returned to Canada in late 1919.
