= Royal Aircraft Factory F.E.2 =

Type of fighter aircraft

F.E.2b
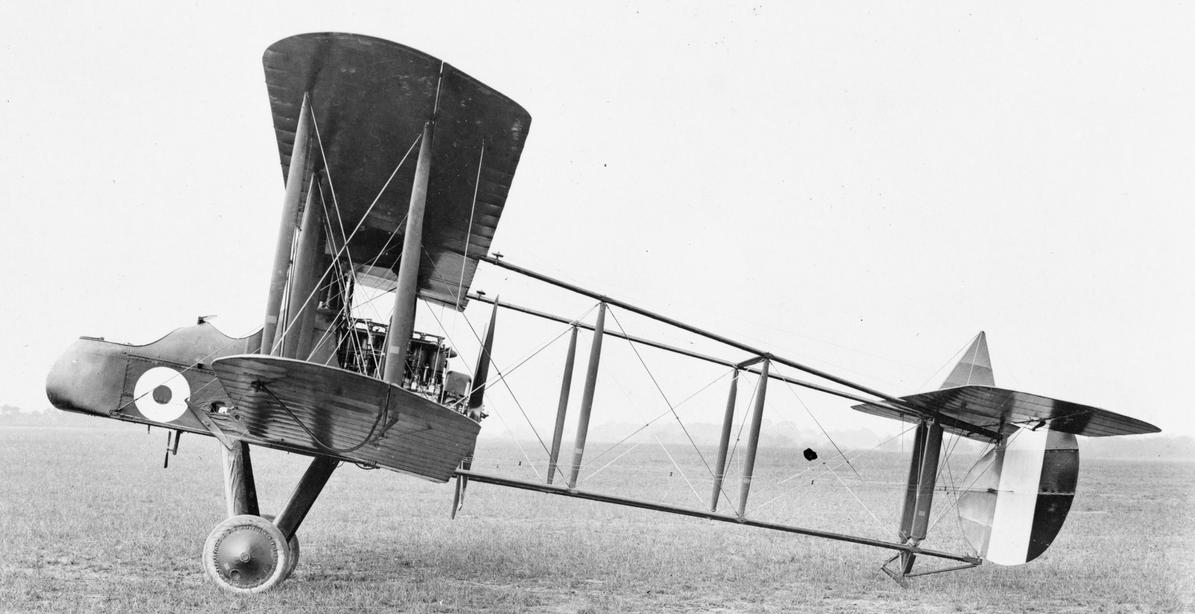
- F.E.2b with "V" type undercarriage

General information
- Type: Fighter/Reconnaissance, Night Bomber
- Manufacturer: Royal Aircraft Factory
- Status: Retired
- Primary user: Royal Flying Corps
- Number built: 1,939

History
- Manufactured: 1914–1918
- Introduction date: September 1915
- First flight: February 1914
- Retired: 1918
- Variants: F.E.1, Vickers VIM

Between 1911 and 1914, the Royal Aircraft Factory used the F.E.2 ("Farman Experimental 2") designation for three different aircraft that shared only a common "Farman" pusher biplane layout.

The third "F.E.2" type was operated as a day and night bomber and fighter by the Royal Flying Corps during the First World War. Along with the single-seat D.H.2 pusher biplane and the Nieuport 11, the F.E.2 was instrumental in ending the Fokker Scourge that had seen the German Air Service establish a measure of air superiority on the Western Front from the late summer of 1915 to the following spring.

== Design and development ==
The Farman Experimental 2 designation refers to three distinct designs – all pushers based on the general layout employed by the French aircraft designers, the Farman Brothers – but otherwise completely different aircraft. This "re-use" of the F.E.2 designation has caused much confusion.

=== F.E.2 (1911) ===
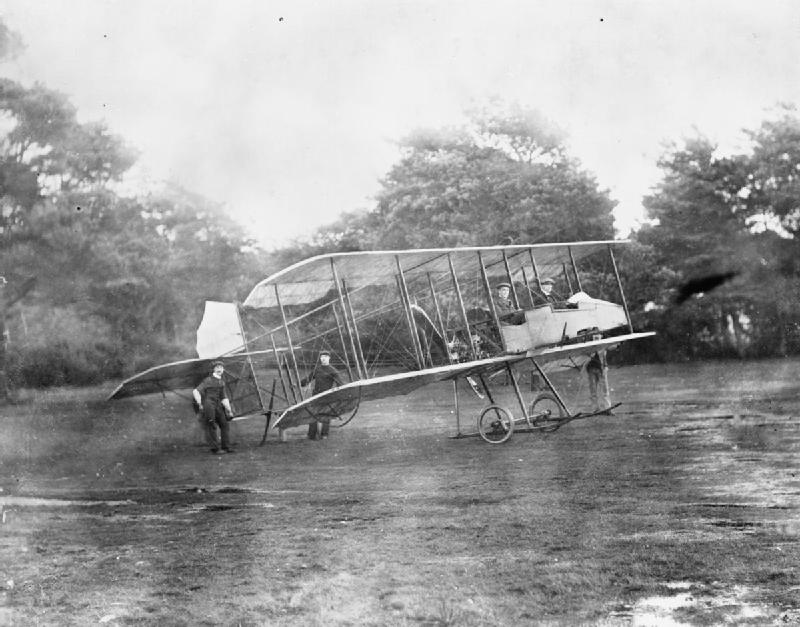
The first F.E.2 (1911)

The first F.E.2 was designed by Geoffrey de Havilland at the Royal Aircraft Factory in 1911. Although it was claimed to be a rebuild of the F.E.1, a pusher biplane designed and built by de Havilland before he joined the Factory's staff, it was in fact an entirely new aircraft, with construction completed before the F.E.1 was wrecked in a crash in August 1911. The new aircraft resembled the final form of the F.E.1, with no front elevator, but seated a crew of two in a wood and canvas nacelle, and was powered by a 50 hp (37 kW) Gnome rotary engine.

It made its maiden flight on 18 August 1911, flown by de Havilland. It was fitted with floats in April 1912, first flying in this form on 12 April 1912, but was underpowered and its engine was therefore replaced by a 70 hp (52 kW) Gnome, this allowed it to take off carrying a passenger while fitted with floats. Later in the year the F.E.2, refitted with a landplane undercarriage, was modified to carry a Maxim machine gun on a flexible mount in the nose.

=== F.E.2 (1913) ===
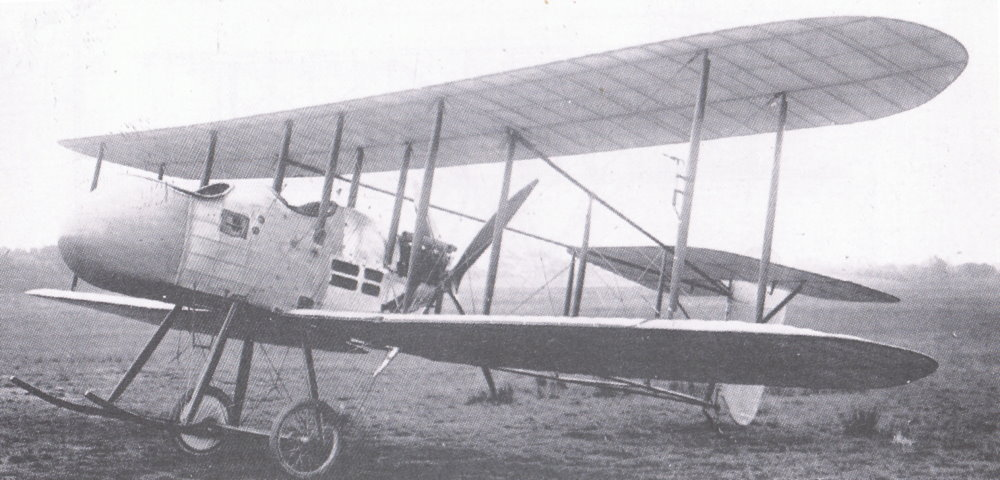
The second aircraft bearing the F.E.2 designation (1913).

The second F.E.2 was officially a rebuild of the first F.E.2, and may indeed have included some components from the earlier aircraft. It was, however, a totally new and much more modern design, larger and heavier than the 1911 aircraft, with the wingspan increased from 33 ft (10.06 m) to 42 ft (12.80 m) and a new, more streamlined nacelle. Loaded weight rose from 1,200 lb (545 kg) to 1,865 lb (848 kg). The new F.E.2 used the outer wings of the B.E.2a, with wing warping instead of ailerons for lateral control, and was powered by a 70 hp Renault engine. It was destroyed when it spun into the ground from 500 ft (150 m) on 23 February 1914, probably because of insufficient fin area. The pilot, R. Kemp, survived the crash, but his passenger was killed.

=== F.E.2 (1914) ===
Work started on another totally new design in mid-1914, the F.E.2a, specifically intended as a "fighter", or machine gun carrier – in the same class as the Vickers FB.5 "Gunbus". Apart from the "Farman" layout it bore no direct relationship with either of the two earlier designs: the outer wing panels were identical with those of the B.E.2c. It was a two-seater with the observer in the nose of the nacelle and the pilot sitting above and behind. The observer was armed with a .303 in Lewis machine gun firing forward on a specially designed, "witches broomstick" mounting that gave it a wide field of fire. The first production order for 12 aircraft was placed "off the drawing board" (i.e. prior to first flight) shortly after the outbreak of the First World War. By this time, the "pusher" configuration was aerodynamically obsolescent, but was retained to allow a clear forward field of fire.

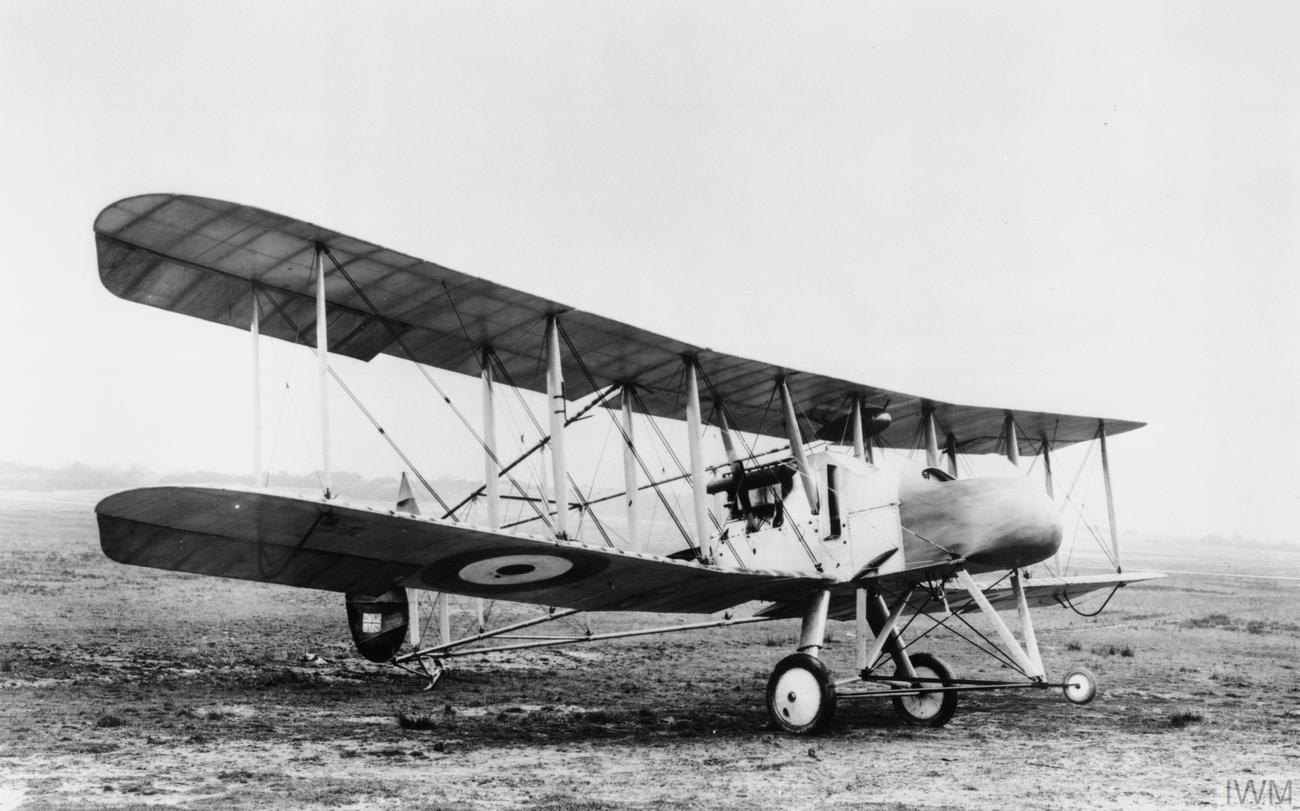
F.E.2a with original undercarriage

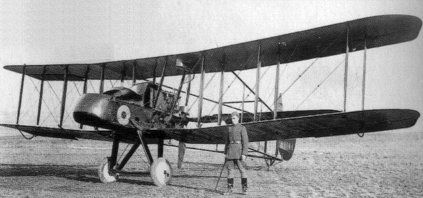
F.E.2b with "V" undercarriage

The undercarriage of the "third" F.E.2 was particularly well designed – a small nose wheel prevented nose-overs when landing on soft ground, and the oleo type shock absorbers (Note: These were strictly not "oleo struts" in the modern sense, but instead employed a combination of concentric helical springs and oil-dampers.) were also appreciated by crews landing in rough, makeshift fields. In order to reduce weight and drag some of the production aircraft were fitted with a normal "V" type undercarriage. This was not universally popular and when a method was devised of removing the nose wheel in the field without disturbing the shock absorbers, this became the most common form of the F.E.2 undercarriage. The "V" undercarriage remained standard for F.E.2 night bombers, as it permitted the carriage of a large bomb under the nacelle.

The first production batch consisted of 12 of the initial F.E.2a variant, with a large air brake under the top centre section, and a Green E.6 engine. The first F.E.2a made its maiden flight on 26 January 1915, but was found to be underpowered, and was re-engined with a Beardmore 120 hp (89 kW) liquid-cooled inline engine, as were the other eleven aircraft.

The F.E.2a was quickly followed by the main production model, the F.E.2b, again powered by a Beardmore, initially of 120 hp, although later F.E.2bs received the 160 hp (119 kW) model. The air brake of the "a" failed to deliver a worthwhile reduction in the landing run and was omitted to simplify production. The type could also carry an external bomb load, and was routinely fitted with a standard air-photography camera. A total of 1,939 F.E.2bs were built, only a few of them at the Royal Aircraft Factory, as most construction was by private British manufacturers such as G & J Weir, Boulton & Paul Ltd and Ransomes, Sims & Jefferies.

Early in the F.E.2b's career, a second Lewis gun was added in front of the pilot's cockpit, on a high telescopic mounting so that the pilot could fire forward, over his observer's head. In practice, this gun was appropriated by the observers, especially when they discovered that by climbing onto the rim of their cockpits they could fire backwards over the top wing – to some extent overcoming the notorious deficiency of pusher types in rear defence, although even this failed to cover a very large blind spot under the tail. The observer's perch was a precarious one, especially when firing the "rear gun", and he was liable to be thrown out of his cockpit, although his view was excellent in all directions except directly to the rear.

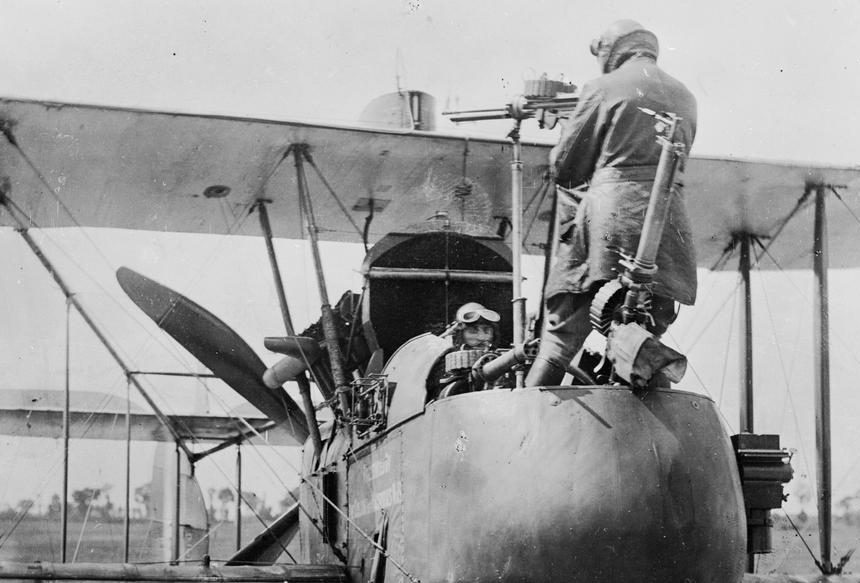
An F.E.2d observer demonstrating the use of the rear-firing Lewis gun, which required him to stand on the rim of his cockpit. Note the camera, and the (non-standard) fixed Lewis gun for the pilot.

The arrangement was described by Frederick Libby, an American ace who served as an F.E.2b observer in 1916:

When you stood up to shoot, all of you from the knees up was exposed to the elements. There was no belt to hold you. Only your grip on the gun and the sides of the nacelle stood between you and eternity. Toward the front of the nacelle was a hollow steel rod with a swivel mount to which the gun was anchored. This gun covered a huge field of fire forward. Between the observer and the pilot a second gun was mounted, for firing over the F.E.2b's upper wing to protect the aircraft from rear attack ... Adjusting and shooting this gun required that you stand right up out of the nacelle with your feet on the nacelle coaming. You had nothing to worry about except being blown out of the aircraft by the blast of air or tossed out bodily if the pilot made a wrong move. There were no parachutes and no belts. No wonder they needed observers.

The Royal Aircraft Factory was primarily a research establishment and other experiments were carried out using F.E.2bs, including the testing of a generator-powered searchlight attached between two .303 inch (7.7 mm) Lewis guns, apparently for night fighting duties.

The F.E.2c was an experimental night fighter and bomber variant of the F.E.2b, the main change being the switching of the pilot's and observer's positions so that the pilot had the best view for night landings. Two were built in 1916, with the designation being re-used in 1918 for a similar night bomber version of the F.E.2b, which was used by 100 Squadron. In the end, the observer-first layout was retained for the standard aircraft.

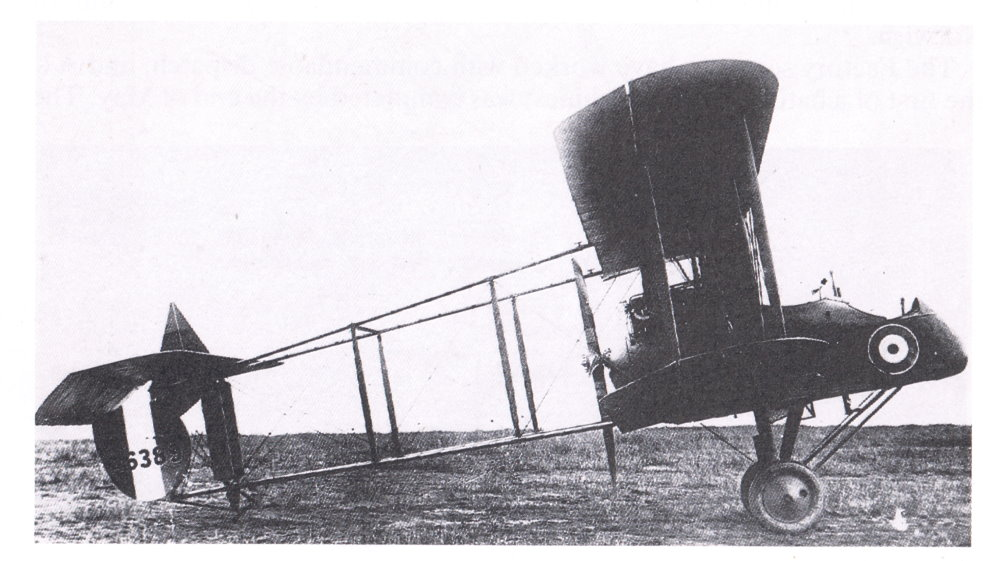
F.E 2d with nosewheel removed

The final production model was the F.E.2d (386 built) which was powered by a Rolls-Royce Eagle engine with 250 hp (186 kW). While the more powerful engine made little difference in maximum speed, especially at low altitude, it did improve altitude performance, with an extra 10 mph at 5,000 ft. The Rolls-Royce engine also improved payload, so that in addition to the two observer's guns, an additional one or two Lewis guns could be mounted to fire forward, operated by the pilot.

At least two F.E.2bs were fitted with 150 hp (110 kW) RAF 5 engines (a pusher version of the RAF 4 engine) in 1916 but no production followed. The F.E.2h was an F.E.2 powered by a 230 hp (170 kW) Siddeley Puma. The prototype (A6545) was converted in February 1918 by Ransomes, Sims & Jefferies, in the hope of producing a night fighter with superior performance. When tested at Martlesham Heath, it proved to be little better than the F.E.2b. Despite this, three more aircraft were converted to F.E.2h standard, these being fitted with a six-pounder (57 mm) Davis gun, mounted to fire downwards for ground attack purposes.

While the F.E.2d was replaced by the Bristol Fighter, the older F.E.2b proved an unexpected success as a light tactical night bomber, and remained a standard type in this role for the rest of the war. Its climb rate and ceiling were too poor for it to make a satisfactory night fighter.

== Operational history ==
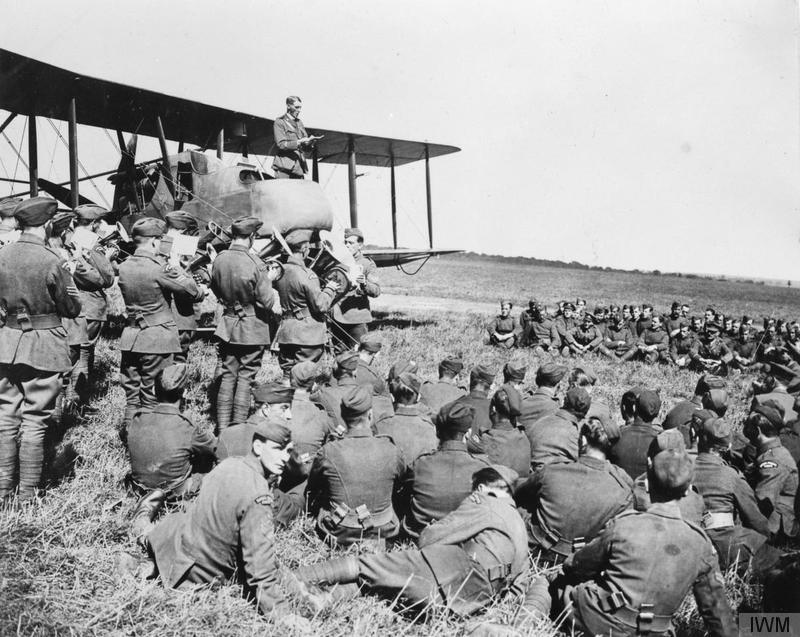
An F.E.2b used as RFC chaplain's "pulpit"

The F.E.2a entered service in May 1915 with No. 6 Squadron RFC, which used the F.E.2 in conjunction with B.E.2s and a single Bristol Scout. The first squadron to be equipped entirely with the F.E.2 was 20 Squadron, deploying to France on 23 January 1916. At this stage it served as a fighter-reconnaissance aircraft – eventually about 2/3 of the F.E.2s were built as fighters (816) and 1/3 as bombers (395). The F.E.2b and F.E.2d variants remained in day operations well into 1917, while the "b" continued as a standard night bomber until August 1918. At its peak, the F.E.2b equipped 16 RFC squadrons in France and six Home Defence squadrons in England.

On 18 June 1916, German flying ace Max Immelmann was killed in combat with F.E.2bs of No. 25 Squadron RFC. The squadron claimed the kill, but the German version of the encounter is either that Immelmann's Fokker Eindecker broke up after his synchroniser gear failed and he shot off his own propeller, or that he was hit by friendly fire from German anti-aircraft guns. In any case, by this time the F.E.2b was at least encountering the German monoplane fighters on more or less even terms and the so-called "Fokker scourge" had ended.

By autumn 1916, the arrival of more modern German fighters such as the Albatros D.I and Halberstadt D.II meant that even the F.E.2d was outperformed and by April 1917, it had been withdrawn from offensive patrols. Despite its obsolescence in 1917, the F.E.2 was still well liked by its crews for its strength and good flight characteristics and it still occasionally proved a difficult opponent for even the best German aces. Rittmeister Baron von Richthofen was badly wounded in the head during combat with F.E.2d aircraft in June 1917 – the Red Baron, like most German pilots of the period, classed the F.E.2 as a "Vickers" type, confusing it with the earlier Vickers F.B.5.

In combat with single-seater fighters, the pilots of F.E.2b and F.E.2d fighters would form what was probably the first use of what later became known as a Lufbery circle (defensive circle). (Note: The term for this tactic is attributed to Major Raoul Lufbery, a French-American fighter pilot and flying ace, although he was not the first to employ it.) In the case of the F.E.2, the intention was that the gunner of each aircraft could cover the blind spot under the tail of his neighbour and several gunners could fire on any enemy attacking the group. On occasion formations of F.E.2s fought their way back from far over the lines, while under heavy attack from German fighters, using this tactic.

Although outclassed as a day fighter, the F.E.2 proved very suitable for use at night and was used as a night fighter in home defence squadrons on anti-Zeppelin patrols and as a light tactical night bomber. It was first used as a night bomber in November 1916, with the first specialist F.E.2b night bomber squadrons being formed in February 1917. F.E.2bs were used as night bombers in eight bomber squadrons until the end of the First World War, with up to 860 being converted to, or built as bombers. Service as a night fighter was less successful, owing to the type's poor climb and ceiling.

F.E.2bs were experimentally fitted with flotation bags for operation over water and were also used to conduct anti-submarine patrols, operating from the Isle of Grain at the mouth of the Thames River.

A total of 35 aircraft derived from the F.E.2 were sold to China in 1919 by Vickers as Vickers Instructional Machines (VIM), to be used as advanced trainers, having a redesigned nacelle fitted with dual controls and powered by a Rolls-Royce Eagle VIII engine.

== Fictional appearances ==
Derek Robinson's novel War Story is about the fictional Hornet Squadron flying the F.E.2b, and later the F.E.2d, giving an account of flying the fighter in the months leading up to the Battle of the Somme. Robert Radcliffe's novel Across the Blood-Red Skies is narrated by an F.E.2 pilot, and offers an insight into the skills required to fly the aeroplane. William Stanley's novel One Spring in Picardy is the story of a night-bomber FE2b squadron in France in the spring of 1918. Captain W.E. Johns' character Biggles starts his operational career in the fictional 169 Squadron, flying the F.E.2b.

== Survivors and replicas ==
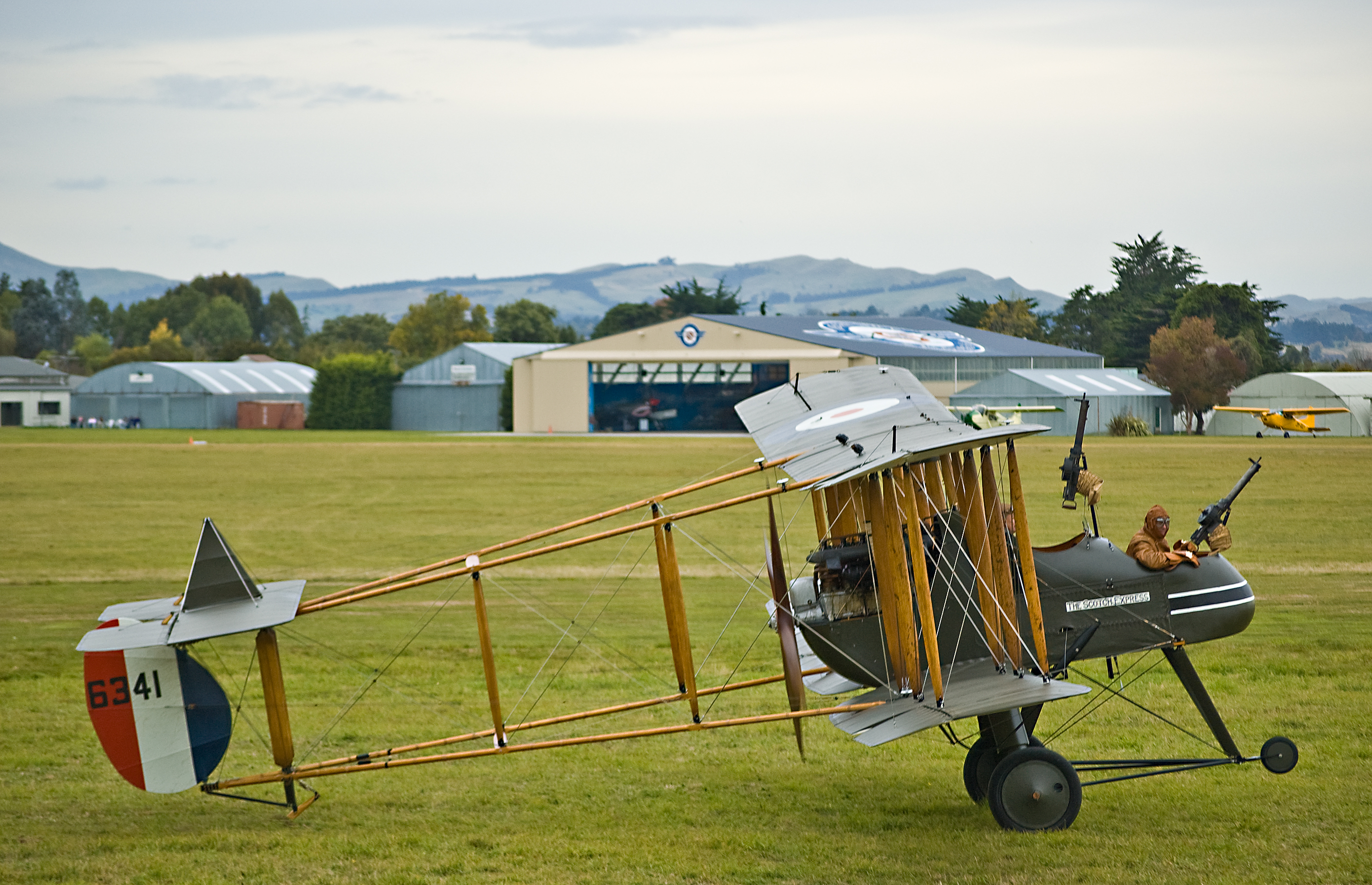
The airworthy replica built by Vintage Aviator Ltd makes its debut on 25 April 2009 at Hood Aerodrome, New Zealand.

The Royal Air Force Museum London displays an F.E.2b. The wings and tail struts are replicas but the aircraft's nacelle and engine are original. The nacelle was made in 1918 by Richard Garrett & Sons, who were subcontracted to make the nacelles for Boulton & Paul Ltd, who assembled the complete aircraft. However, this nacelle was unfinished and never built into a complete aircraft. It was retained by Garretts until 1976 when it was passed to the RAF Museum. In 1986, the museum began a restoration project and commissioned the construction of replica wings and tail; a Beardmore engine was bought in New Zealand in 1992. The lengthy restoration was finally completed and the aircraft put on display in 2009.

Two reproductions of the F.E.2b, one to full airworthiness standards and fitted with a genuine Beardmore engine, have been manufactured by The Vintage Aviator of New Zealand.

== Operators ==
Australia

- Australian Flying Corps

- Central Flying School AFC at Point Cook, Victoria – One aircraft only.

United Kingdom

- Royal Flying Corps / Royal Air Force

  - No. 6 Squadron RAF
  - No. 11 Squadron RAF
  - No. 12 Squadron RAF
  - No. 16 Squadron RAF
  - No. 18 Squadron RAF
  - No. 20 Squadron RAF
  - No. 22 Squadron RAF
  - No. 23 Squadron RAF
  - No. 24 Squadron RAF
  - No. 25 Squadron RAF
  - No. 28 Squadron RAF
  - No. 31 Squadron RAF
  - No. 33 Squadron RAF
  - No. 36 Squadron RAF
  - No. 38 Squadron RAF
  - No. 39 Squadron RAF
  - No. 51 Squadron RAF
  - No. 57 Squadron RAF
  - No. 58 Squadron RAF
  - No. 78 Squadron RAF
  - No. 64 Squadron RAF
  - No. 83 Squadron RAF
  - No. 90 Squadron RAF
  - No. 100 Squadron RAF
  - No. 101 Squadron RAF
  - No. 102 Squadron RAF
  - No. 116 Squadron RAF
  - No. 118 Squadron RAF
  - No. 131 Squadron RAF
  - No. 133 Squadron RAF
  - No. 148 Squadron RAF
  - No. 149 Squadron RAF
  - No. 166 Squadron RAF
  - No. 191 Squadron RAF
  - No. 192 Squadron RAF
  - No. 199 Squadron RAF
  - No. 200 Squadron RAF
  - No. 246 Squadron RAF

- China
  - Republic of China Air Force
- United States
  - American Expeditionary Force

== Royal Aircraft Factory F.E.2 aces ==
During its widespread service, 48 aces flew the FE2 and 20 observers also became aces.

F.E.2b pilot aces

- Carleton Main Clement - 8
- Chester Stairs Duffus - 5
- James Green
- Harold Hartney
- Victor Huston
- Reginald Malcolm
- Stephen Price
- John Quested
- Lancelot Richardson
- David Stewart
- Noel Webb
- Charles Woollven

F.E.2d pilot aces

- Donald Cunnell
- Harry G. E. Luchford
- Reginald Makepeace
- Ranald Reid
- Guy Reid
- Cecil Roy Richards
- Frederick Thayre - 19
- Richard M. Trevethan

F.E.2b observer aces

- Giles Blennerhasset – 8
- Leslie Court
- John Cowell
- Leonard Herbert Emsden – 8
- Frederick Libby
- James Robert Smith

F.E.2d observer aces

- William Cambray
- Francis Cubbon - 21
- Campbell Hoy
- Laurence Henry Scott
- Thomas Lewis
- James Tennant

== Specifications (F.E.2b) ==
Data from Warplanes of the First World War: Fighters, Volume Two

General characteristics

- Crew: 2
- Length: 32 ft 3 in (9.83 m)
- Wingspan: 47 ft 9 in (14.55 m)
- Height: 12 ft 8 in (3.86 m)
- Wing area: 494 sq ft (45.9 m^{2})
- Empty weight: 2,061 lb (935 kg)
- Gross weight: 3,037 lb (1,378 kg)
- Powerplant: 1 × Beardmore 6-cylinder water-cooled in-line piston engine, 160 hp (120 kW)
- Propellers: 4-bladed wooden fixed-pitch pusher propeller

Performance

- Maximum speed: 91.5 mph (147.3 km/h, 79.5 kn)
- Endurance: 3 hours
- Service ceiling: 11,000 ft (3,400 m)
- Time to altitude: 10,000 ft (3,048 m) in 39 minutes 44 seconds
- Wing loading: 6.15 lb/sq ft (30.0 kg/m^{2})
- Power/mass: 0.053 hp/lb (0.087 kW/kg)

Armament

- Guns: :* 1 or 2 × .303 in (7.7 mm) Lewis gun for observer (one mounted in front and one firing back over the top wing)

- 1 or 2 × .303 in (7.7 mm) Lewis gun sometimes mounted for the pilot's use in the F.E.2d

- Bombs:

- Up to 517 lb (235 kg) of bombs

== See also ==
Related development

- Royal Aircraft Factory F.E.1
- Royal Aircraft Factory F.E.8
- Royal Aircraft Factory B.E.2
- Vickers VIM

Aircraft of comparable role, configuration, and era

- Vickers F.B.5
- Airco DH.1

Related lists

- List of aircraft of the Royal Flying Corps
