= Izel-lès-Hameau =

Administrative division in Hauts-de-France, France

- Commune
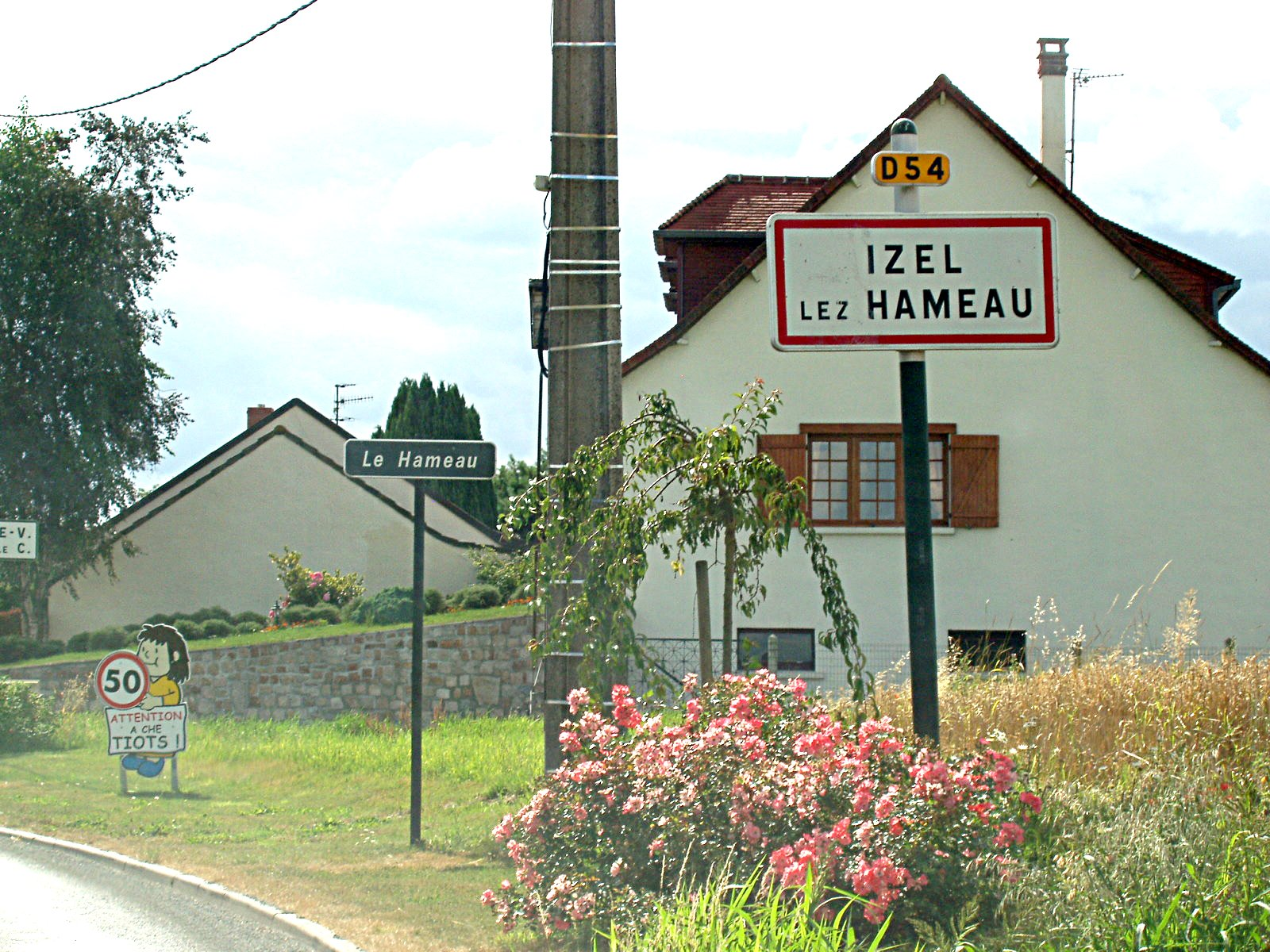
- The road into Izel-lès-Hameau

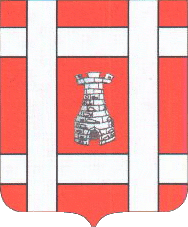
- Coat of arms
- Location of Izel-lès-Hameau
- Location within France Location within Hauts-de-France
- Coordinates: 50°18′56″N 2°31′59″E
- Country: France
- Region: Hauts-de-France
- Department: Pas-de-Calais
- Arrondissement: Arras
- Canton: Avesnes-le-Comte
- Intercommunality: CC Campagnes de l'Artois

Government
  - Mayor (2020–2026): Jean-Michel Schulz
- Area^{1}: 8.51 km^{2} (3.29 sq mi)
- Elevation: 120 m (390 ft)
- Highest elevation: 148 m (486 ft)
- Lowest elevation: 103 m (338 ft)
- Population (2023): 742
  - Density: 87.2/km^{2} (226/sq mi)
- Time zone: UTC+01:00 (CET)
  - Summer (DST): UTC+02:00 (CEST)
- INSEE/Postal code: 62477 /62690
- ^{1} French Land Register data, which excludes lakes, ponds, glaciers > 1 km^{2} (0.386 sq mi or 247 acres) and river estuaries.

Izel-lès-Hameau (French pronunciation: [izɛl lɛ amo]; before June 2009: Izel-les-Hameaux) is a commune in the Pas-de-Calais department in the Hauts-de-France region of France 11 miles (18 km) west of Arras.

== History ==
During the First World War a farm about 1 kilometre (0.62 mi) east, known as Filescamp Farm, was converted for use by the Royal Flying Corps. The location was known as Le Hameau. It was commemorated with a ceremony and plaque in 2015.

== Population ==
Historical population
Year	Pop.	±% p.a.
1968	501	—
1975	509	+0.23%
1982	542	+0.90%
1990	704	+3.32%
1999	668	−0.58%
2007	687	+0.35%
2012	689	+0.06%
2017	727	+1.08%
2023	742	+0.34%
Source: INSEE

== See also ==
- Communes of the Pas-de-Calais department
