= James Green (RFC airman) =

British World War I flying ace

James Hubert Ronald Green
- Born: 7 February 1897; Buckland, Berkshire, England
- Died: 15 December 1917 (aged 20); Norwich, Norfolk, England
- Burial place: Abingdon, Berkshire, England
- Military career
- Allegiance: England
- Branch: Aviation
- Rank: Sergeant
- Unit: No. 25 Squadron RFC
- Awards: Italian Medal for Military Valor

Sergeant James Hubert Ronald Green (7 February 1897 – 15 December 1917) was a World War I flying ace credited with six aerial victories.

== Early life ==
Green was born on 7 February 1897 in Buckland, Berkshire, the son of Walter and Annie Louisa Green; his father was a groom.

== Death ==
Green was killed in a flying accident near Norwich on 15 December 1917. He was buried at Abingdon, Berkshire.
