= No. 25 Squadron RAF =

Flying squadron of the Royal Air Force

No. XXV (F) Squadron RAF
- Squadron badge
- Active: 1915–1918 (RFC); 1918–1920; 1920–1958; 1958–1962; 1963–1989; 1989–2008; 2018–present
- Country: United Kingdom
- Branch: Royal Air Force
- Type: Flying training squadron
- Role: Advanced fast jet flying training
- Part of: No. 22 Group; No. 4 Flying Training School
- Station: RAF Valley
- Mottos: Feriens tego (Latin for 'Striking I defend')
- Aircraft: BAE Systems Hawk T2

Insignia
- Roundel
- Tail codes: RX (Dec 1938 – Sep 1939); ZK (Sep 1939 – Apr 1951); FA–FZ (Jul 1989 – Apr 2008); FA–FM (Sep 2018 – present)

No. 25 (Fighter) Squadron, also known as No. XXV (F) Squadron, is a squadron of the Royal Air Force. It operates the BAE Systems Hawk T2 and provides advanced fast jet training for pilots of the RAF and Royal Navy, as part of No. 4 Flying Training School based at RAF Valley, Anglesey.

During the First World War, No. 25 Squadron operated in the fighter-reconnaissance role and later as a bomber squadron. In the inter-war years, the squadron was based at RAF Hawkinge in Kent, from where No. 25 Squadron's badge originated. Throughout the Second World War, the unit flew both bombers and escorted bombers. In the 1950s, it became took on the night-fighter role and between 1963 and 1989 it operated the Bristol Bloodhound surface-to-air missile from RAF Brüggen, West Germany and later RAF Wyton, Cambridgeshire. The squadron regained its wings in July 1989, operating the Panavia Tornado F3 interceptor, until April 2008 when it disbanded. It was dormant until it reformed on 8 September 2018 in its current training role.

== History ==
=== First World War (1915–1919) ===
No. 25 Squadron was initially formed as part of the Royal Flying Corps (RFC) at Montrose Airfield in Angus, from a nucleus provided by No. 6 Squadron. Upon its formation, the squadron operated numerous aircraft types such as the Maurice Farman MF.11 Shorthorn and the Avro 504.

The squadron relocated to Barnham, Norfolk on 31 December 1915 and shortly after was equipped with the Vickers F.B.5, these however were exchanged for the Royal Aircraft Factory F.E.2b by February of the following year.

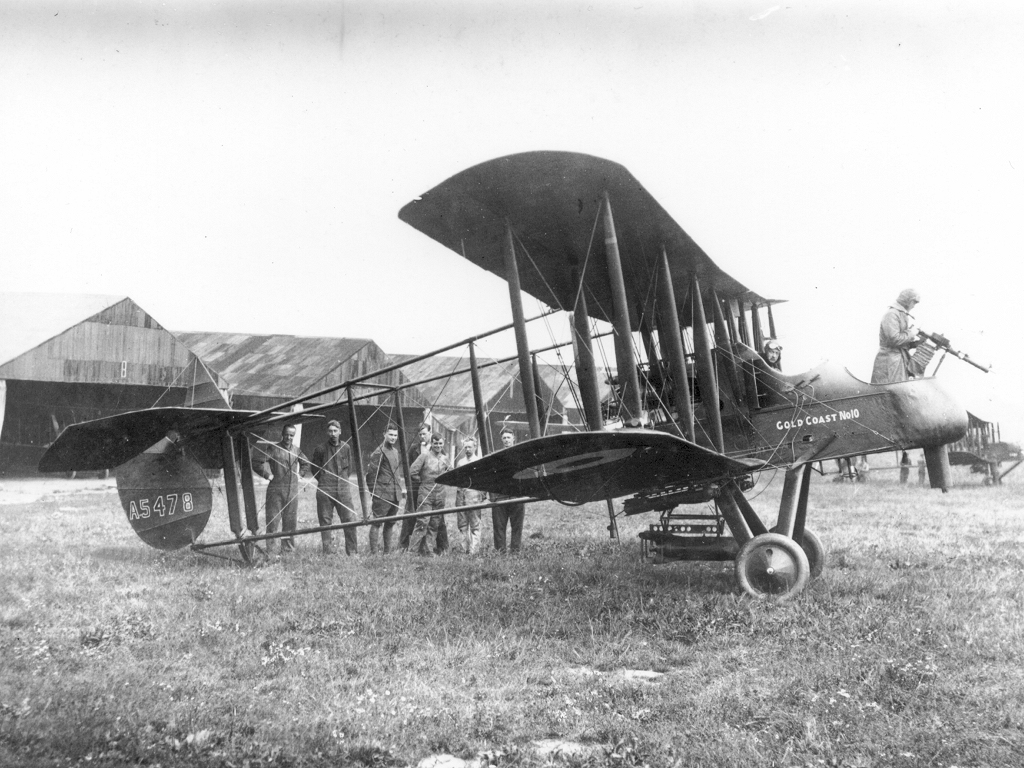
A Royal Aircraft Factory F.E.2, similar to those operated by No. 25 Squadron from 1916 to 1917.

The squadron was deployed to the RFC headquarters at Saint-Omer, France on 20 February 1916, as a long-range reconnaissance and fighter unit. The squadron was initially tasked with intercepting German aircraft, operating in the routes taken by the Luftstreitkräfte on their way to raid England. However, this was proven to be ineffective and the Squadron was transferred to protect General Headquarters and Audruicq, flying sorties with No. 21 Squadron.

On 1 April 1916, No. 25 Squadron relocated to the aerodrome at Auchel, operating alongside No. 18 Squadron and No. 27 Squadron. From here the it supported the British 1st Army near Fromelles and Souchez. In June 1916, in preparation for the Somme Offensive, the squadron had its ranks bolstered to eighteen aircraft, twenty pilots and eighteen observers. In the prelude to the battle, the squadron flew reconnaissance and bombing missions behind enemy lines. On 18 June, Corporal James Henry Waller, and his pilot Second Lieutenant George Reynolds McCubbin, shot down German flying ace Max Immelmann. This occurred during No. 25 Squadron's second encounter with Immelmann that day, after he previously shot down Lieutenant C. E. Rogers for his sixteenth victory. Immelmann, flying a Fokker E.III, engaged the squadron over Lens and subsequently shot down Lieutenant J. R. B. Savage before closing in on McCubbin's F.E.2b, whose gunner, Waller, opened fire and shot him down. For their accomplishment, McCubbin was awarded the Distinguished Service Order while Waller was promoted to Sergeant and received the Distinguished Conduct Medal. When the offensive started on 1 July, No. 25 Squadron started flying night time bombing missions. It started operating the Airco D.H.4 bomber in June 1917.

During the course of the First World War, No. 25 Squadron had nine flying aces among its ranks, including James Fitz-Morris, James Green, Reginald George Malcolm, Lancelot Richardson, Noel Webb, Charles Woollven Alexander Roulstone, Leonard Herbert Emsden, and Hartley Pullan.

=== Interwar years (1919–1938) ===
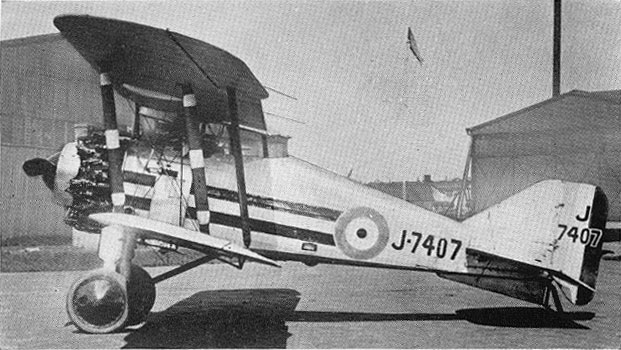
A Gloster Grebe fighter aircraft of No. 25 Squadron in the 1920s

After the war the squadron acquired Airco D.H.9. The unit was disbanded on 31 January 1920 at RAF Scopwick in Lincolnshire. The squadron reformed the next day at RAF Hawkinge in Kent, flying the Sopwith Snipe. It was sent to Turkey in 1922 and 1923 during the Chanak Crisis. After returning to the UK, the unit stayed for a number of years at Hawkinge. The Snipe gave way to the Gloster Grebe and later the Armstrong Whitworth Siskin, while in December 1936 the squadron became the first unit to receive the Hawker Fury Mk. II, having already flown the Fury Mk. I since 1932. The Fury was replaced by the Hawker Demon when the squadron was given a night-fighter role. For night-flying training purposes the squadron also received the Gloster Gladiator. The squadron moved to RAF Northolt in northwest London on 12 September 1938.

=== Second World War (1939–1945) ===
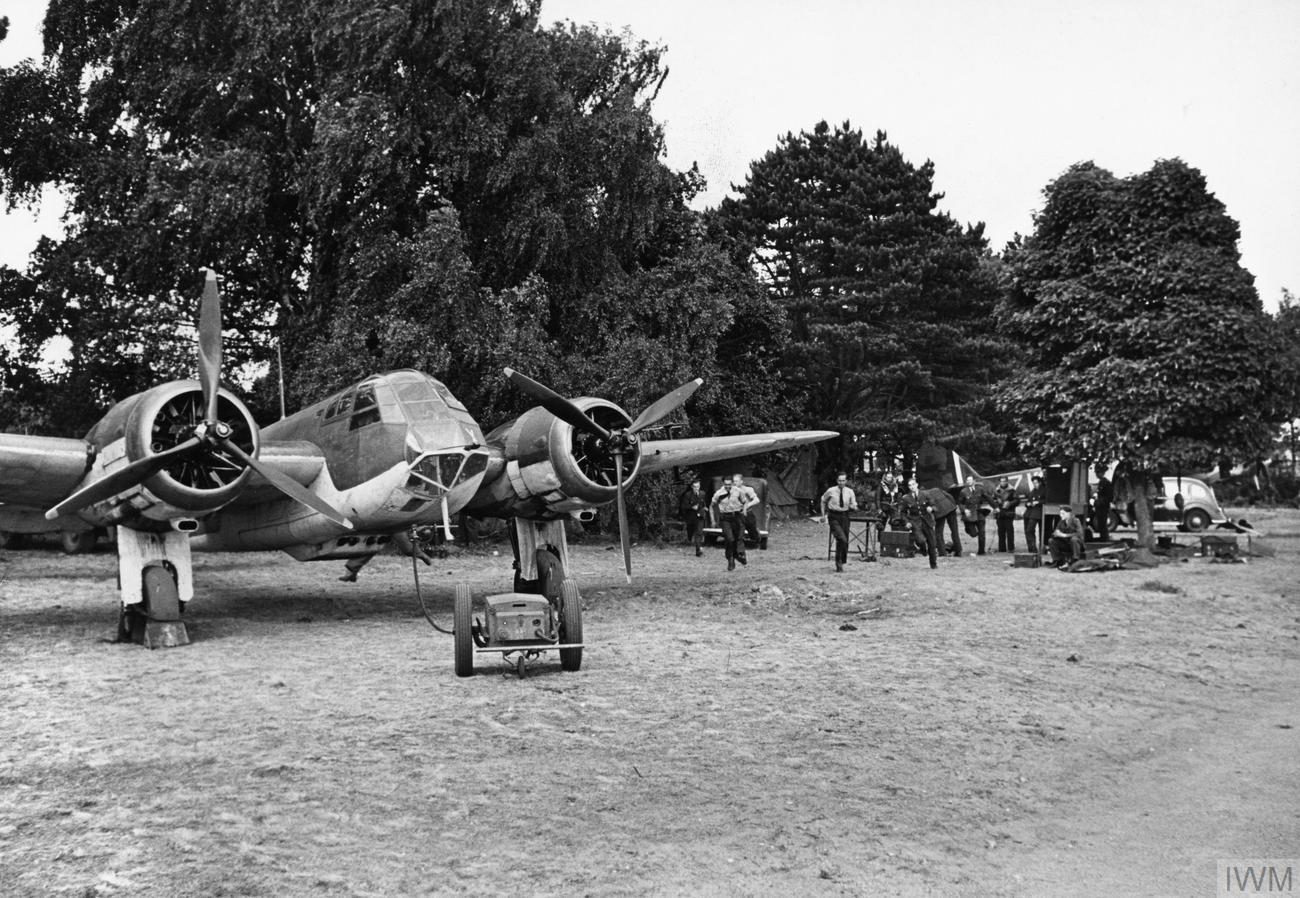
Bristol Blenheim Mk.IF aircraft of No. 25 Squadron at RAF Martlesham Heath, 25 July 1940

During the Second World War, No. 25 Squadron flew the Bristol Blenheim medium bomber on night patrols, which were replaced by the Bristol Beaufighter and later the de Havilland Mosquito. By the closing stages of the war, the squadron was almost entirely committed to bomber escort missions. The squadron was particularly successful during Operation Steinbock from January to May 1944.

=== Cold War (1945–1990s) ===
==== Night fighters ====
After the war ended in 1945, No. 25 Squadron continued to operate the Mosquito NF.30 night fighter from RAF West Malling in Kent until November 1951, when they were replaced by jet powered de Havilland Vampire NF.10, conversion to type having commenced in February 1951. The Vampires were then replaced by the Gloster Meteor NF.12 and NF.14 in March 1954. The squadron moved from West Malling in 1957 to RAF Tangmere in West Sussex, where it disbanded on 23 June 1958.

No. 153 Squadron was renumbered No. 25 Squadron on 1 July 1958 to fly Meteors until their replacement in 1959 with the Gloster Javelin FAW.7.

==== Bloodhound surface-to-air missile ====
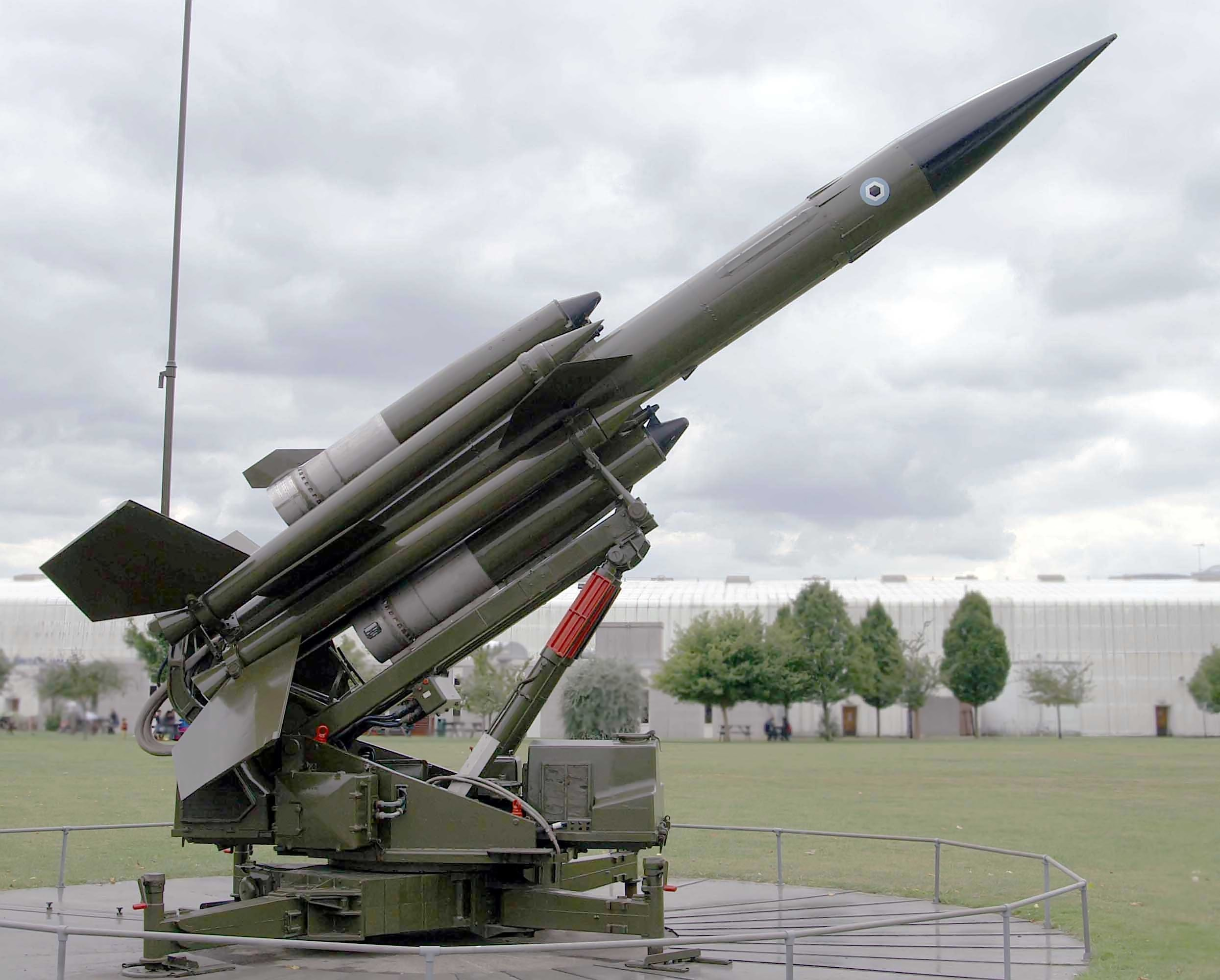
A Bristol Bloodhound surface-to-air missile of the type operated by No. 25 Squadron

No. 25 Squadron disbanded again on 30 November 1962, reforming a year later as the RAF's first Bristol Bloodhound surface-to-air missile unit, based at RAF North Coates in Lincolnshire. In this role, the squadron moved to RAF Brüggen, Germany in 1970, with detachments also protecting nearby RAF Laarbruch and RAF Wildenrath.

In 1983, the squadron moved to RAF Wyton in Cambridgeshire, similarly protecting RAF Barkston Heath and RAF Wattisham.

==== Tornado ====
The RAF withdrew the Bloodhound from 25 Squadron in October 1989 and the squadron immediately reformed at RAF Leeming as a Panavia Tornado F3 fighter squadron. It became operational in January 1990, alongside No. 11 Squadron and No. 23 Squadron, as part of No. 11 Group.

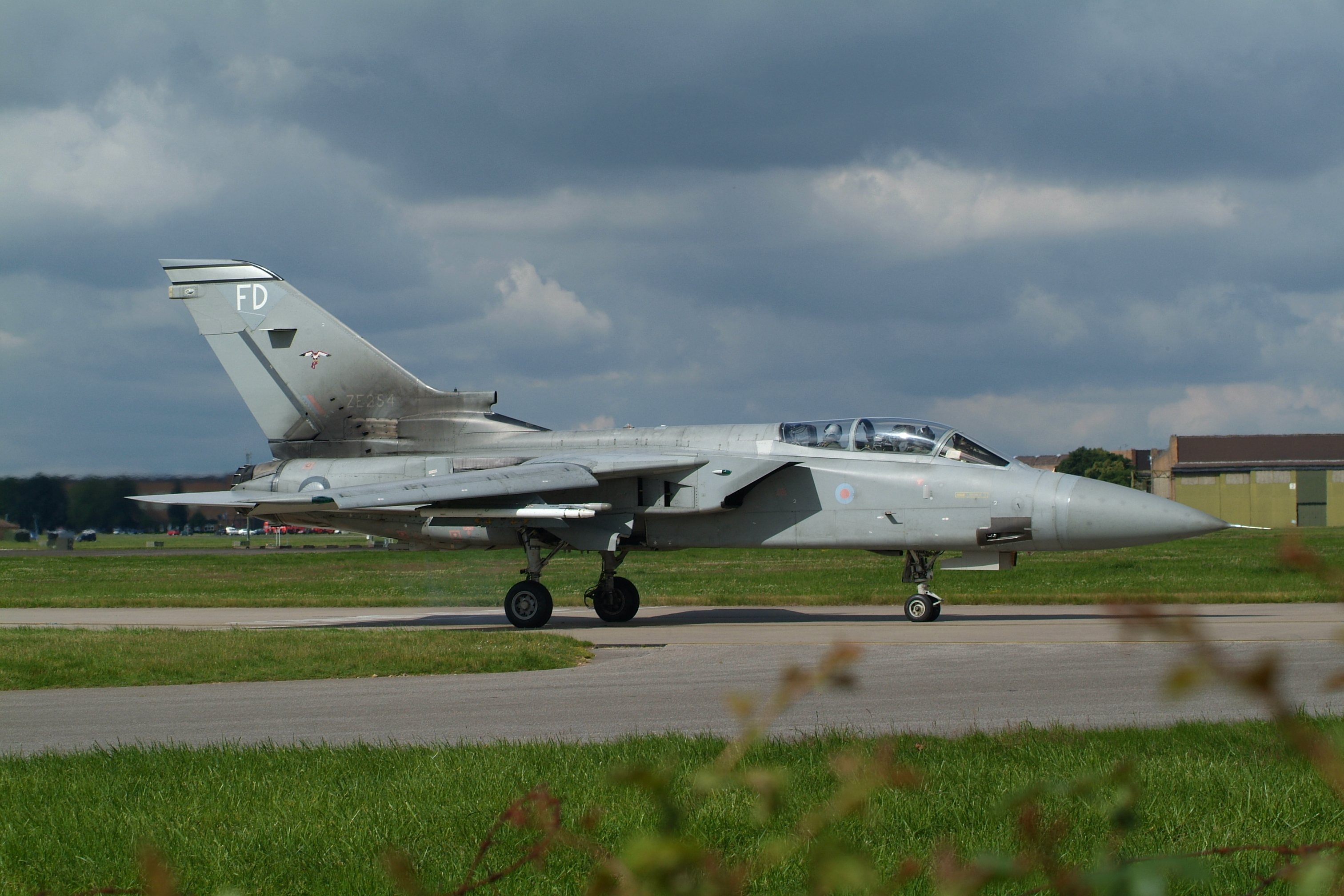
A Panavia Tornado F3 of No. 25 Squadron in 2007

Between September & December 1993 and May & August 1995, the squadron took part in Operation Deny Flight, a NATO-led operation enforcing the United Nations no-fly zone over Bosnia-Herzegovina. Operating out of Gioia del Colle Air Base near Bari, Italy, on each occasion the squadron took over responsibility for supporting the no-fly zone from No. 23 Squadron before being relieved by No. 5 Squadron from RAF Coningsby.

In the late 1990s, the squadron deployed operationally to Saudi Arabia to protect the Shi'ite Muslims of southern Iraq by flying Combat Air Patrol missions below the 33rd parallel, enforcing the southern no-fly zone imposed by Operation Southern Watch.

=== 21st century (2000–present) ===
Between October 2004 and January 2005, a contingent of four aircraft from the squadron was deployed to Šiauliai Air Base in Lithuania as part of to NATO's Baltic Air Policing mission to provide air defence to Lithuania, Latvia and Estonia, following their membership of NATO. Within the UK, the squadron's primary role, along with No. 11 Squadron was the Quick Reaction Alert (South) mission, providing air defence for the southern UK. Most publicly the squadron intercepted eight Russian Tu-95 Bear-H strategic bombers and two Tu-160 Blackjack strategic bombers in July 2007. The squadron disbanded on 4 April 2008, its Tornados relocating to RAF Leuchars in Fife to join the remaining active Tornado F3 squadrons stationed there.

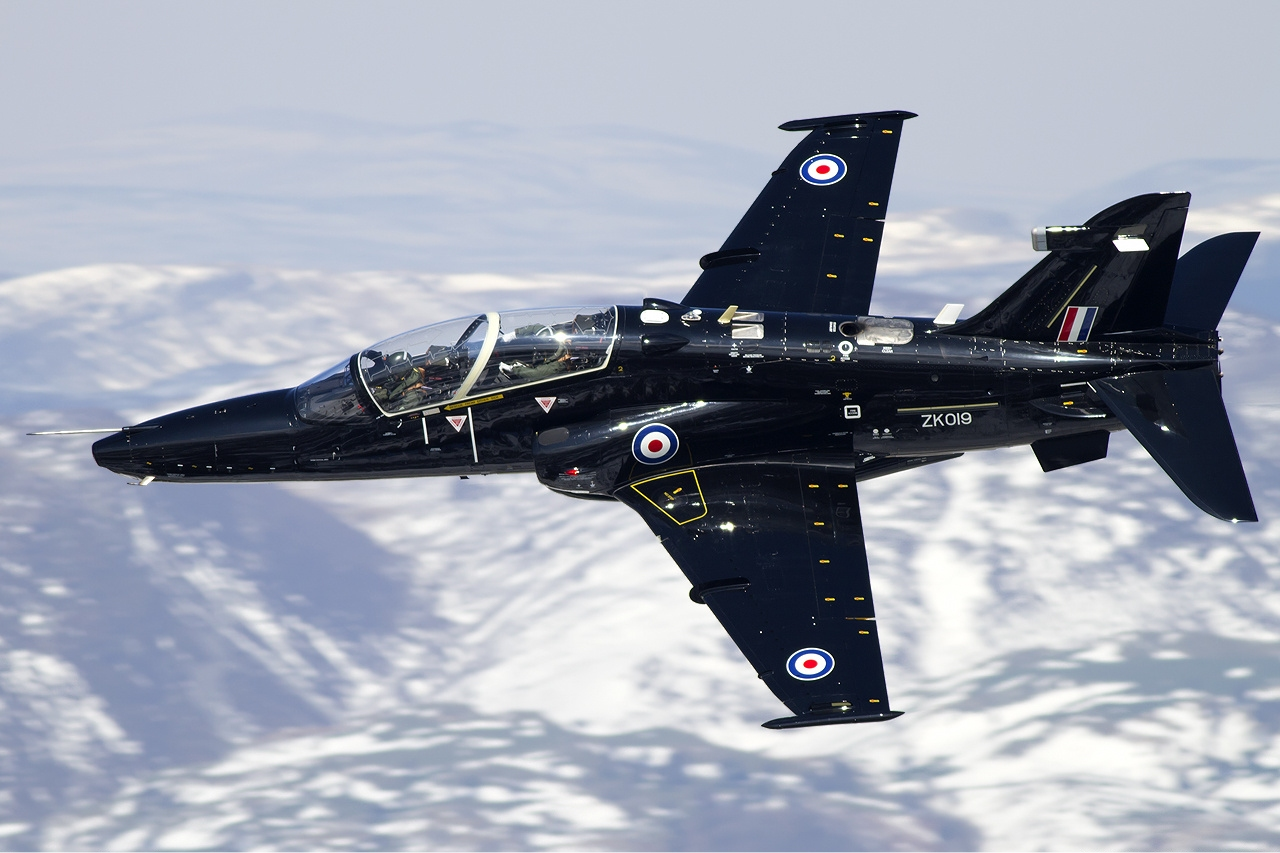
Hawk T2 Advanced Trainer

Due to the increased demand for fast jet pilots in both the RAF and the Fleet Air Arm following the entry into service of the F-35B Lightning, No. 25 Squadron reformed on 8 September 2018 and joined No. 4 Squadron as part of No. 4 Flying Training School at RAF Valley in Anglesey. It operates the BAE Systems Hawk T2, providing jet conversion training, whilst No. 4 Squadron focuses on tactics and weapons training.

== Heritage ==
The squadron's badge features on a gauntlet a hawk rising affrontée. The badge incorporates a previous badge used unofficially by the squadron and the hawk reflects the squadron's period at RAF Hawkinge. It was approved in October 1936.

The squadron's motto is Feriens tego (Latin for 'Striking I defend').

== Battle honours ==
No. 25 Squadron has received the following battle honours. Those marked with an asterisk (*) may be emblazoned on the squadron standard.

- Home Defence (1916)
- Western Front (1916–1918)*
- Somme (1916)
- Arras
- Ypres (1917)*
- Cambrai 1917*
- Somme (1918)*
- Lys
- Hindenburg Line
- Channel & North Sea (1939–1941)
- Battle of Britain (1940)*
- Fortress Europe (1943–1944)*
- Home Defence (1940–1945)*
- France & Germany (1944–1945)*

== See also ==
- Richard Haine
- List of Royal Air Force aircraft squadrons
