= List of World War I aces credited with 6 victories =

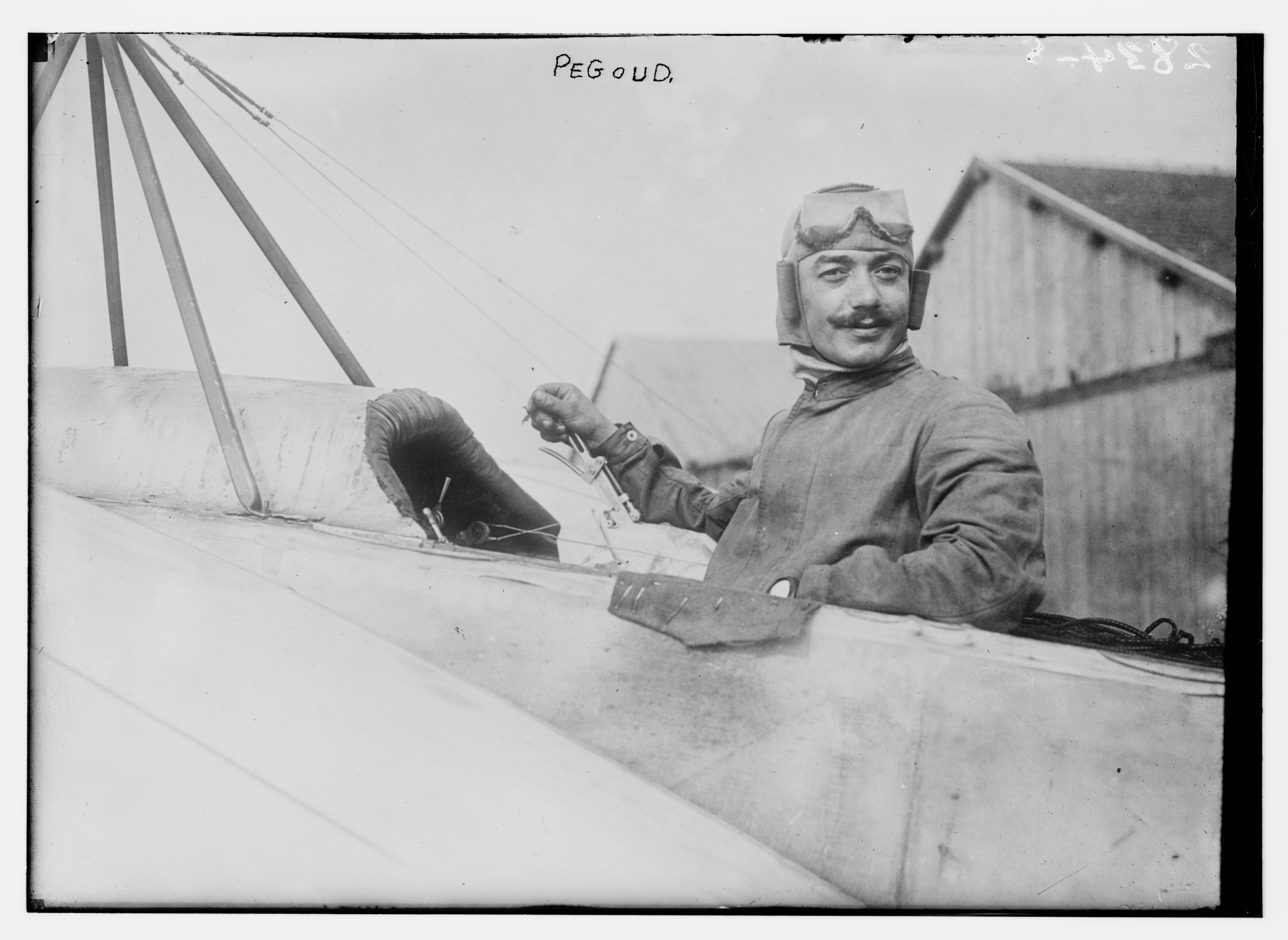
Adolphe Pégoud scored six victories to become history's first flying ace. He was also the first ace killed in action.

The term ace (now commonly flying ace) was first used by French newspapers during World War I, describing Adolphe Pégoud as l'as ('the ace'), after he downed five German aircraft. When aircraft began to shoot or force down other aircraft, systems to count "air victories" were subsequently developed. The American qualification of five victories eventually became the standard, even though other air services had previously used differing figures.

While "ace" status was most often won by fighter pilots, bomber and reconnaissance crews, and observers in two-seater aircraft such as the Bristol F.2b ("Bristol Fighter"), also destroyed enemy aircraft. If a two-seater aircraft destroyed an aircraft, both crew members were credited with a victory. Because pilots usually teamed with differing observer/gunners in two-seater aircraft, an observer might be an ace when his pilot was not, and vice versa. The few aces among combat aviators have historically accounted for the majority of air-to-air victories in military history.

Loss of records by mischance and the passage of time complicates reconstructing the actual count for given aces. The scores presented in the list cannot be definitive, but are based on itemized lists that are the best available sources of information. Aces are listed after verifying the date and location of combat, and the foe vanquished, for every victory accredited by an aviator's home air service using their own aerial victory standards. Those victories for which the evidence is unavailable or fragmentary have been excluded from the victory count.

== Aces ==
This list is complete. Notable aces are linked to their biographies.

This along with the symbolic sword †, indicates that the pilot was known to be either killed in action, missing in action, died of wounds, or killed in a flying accident during World War I.

Name	Country	Air service(s)	Victories
Ivan Agabeg	United Kingdom	Royal Air Force	6
Percival Appleby	Canada	Royal Flying Corps, Royal Air Force	6
Karl Arnold	German Empire	Luftstreitkräfte	6
John Aspinall	United Kingdom	Royal Flying Corps, Royal Air Force	6
Hilbert Bair	United States	Royal Air Force, United States Army Air Service	6
Robert Barbour	United Kingdom	Royal Air Force	6
John Barlow	United Kingdom	Royal Flying Corps	6
Johann Baur	German Empire	Luftstreitkräfte	6
James Beane	United States	Aéronautique Militaire, United States Army Air Service	6
Frank Bell	United Kingdom	Royal Flying Corps, Royal Air Force	6
Eric Betts	United Kingdom	Royal Naval Air Service, Royal Air Force	6
Clayton Bissell	United States	United States Army Air Service, United States Army Air Corps, United States Army Air Forces, United States Air Force	6
Charles Arthur Bissonette	United States	Royal Flying Corps, Royal Air Force	6
Aldo Bocchese	Italy	Corpo Aeronautico Militare	6
Paul Bona	German Empire	Luftstreitkräfte	6
Nicholson Boulton	United Kingdom	Royal Flying Corps, Royal Air Force	6
Percy Boulton	United Kingdom	Royal Air Force	6
Clifford Bowman	United Kingdom	Royal Flying Corps, Royal Air Force	6
Moritz-Waldemar Bretschneider-Bodemer	German Empire	Luftstreitkräfte	6
Arthur Britton	United Kingdom	Royal Flying Corps, Royal Air Force	6
Eric Brookes	United Kingdom	Royal Flying Corps, Royal Air Force	6
Arthur Raymond Brooks	United States	United States Army Air Service	6
Albin Bühl	German Empire	Luftstreitkräfte	6
Harry von Buelow-Bothkamp	German Empire	Luftstreitkräfte, Luftwaffe	6
Leslie William Burbidge	United Kingdom	Royal Flying Corps, Royal Air Force	6
August Burkard	German Empire	Luftstreitkräfte	6
James Bush	United Kingdom	Royal Flying Corps	6
Alessandro Buzio	Italy	Corpo Aeronautico Militare	6
William Cairnes	United Kingdom	Royal Flying Corps, Royal Air Force	6
William Cambray	United Kingdom	Royal Flying Corps, Royal Air Force	6
Douglas Campbell	United States	United States Army Air Service	6
John Candy	United Kingdom	Royal Flying Corps, Royal Air Force	6
Douglas Carbery	United Kingdom	Royal Flying Corps, Royal Air Force	6
Charles Catto	United States	Royal Flying Corps, Royal Air Force	6
Albert Chabrier	France	Aéronautique Militaire	6
Robert Chalmers	Union of South Africa	Royal Flying Corps, Royal Air Force	6
Thomas Chiltern	United Kingdom	Royal Flying Corps, Royal Air Force	6
Antonio Chiri	Italy	Corpo Aeronautico Militare	6
Henry Gordon Clappison	Canada	Royal Naval Air Service, Royal Air Force	6
Edward Clarke	United Kingdom	Royal Flying Corps, Royal Air Force	6
Harris George Clements	United Kingdom	Royal Flying Corps, Royal Air Force	6
John Henry Colbert	United Kingdom	Royal Flying Corps, Royal Air Force	6
Reginald Conder	United Kingdom	Royal Flying Corps, Royal Air Force	6
Gerald Kempster Cooper	United Kingdom	Royal Naval Air Service, Royal Air Force	6
Maurice Cooper	United Kingdom	Royal Naval Air Service, Royal Air Force	6
Norman Cooper alias Ernest S. Tooker	United States	Royal Flying Corps, Royal Air Force	6
Irving Corey	Canada	Royal Air Force	6
Bartolomeo Costantini	Italy	Corpo Aeronautico Militare	6
Louis Coudouret	France	Aéronautique Militaire	6
Jules Covin	France	Aéronautique Militaire	6
Earl Frederick Crabb	Canada	Royal Flying Corps, Royal Air Force, United States Army Air Corps	6
Thomas Culling	New Zealand	Royal Flying Corps	6
William Curphey	United Kingdom	Royal Flying Corps	6
Edward Peck Curtis	United States	United States Army Air Service, United States Army Air Force	6
John Daley	United Kingdom	Royal Flying Corps, Royal Air Force	6
Charles Dance	United Kingdom	Royal Flying Corps, Royal Air Force	6
Edward Darby	United Kingdom	Royal Naval Air Service, Royal Air Force	6
Horace Balfour Davey	United Kingdom	Royal Flying Corps, Royal Air Force	6
Charles Davidson	United Kingdom	Royal Flying Corps, Royal Air Force	6
Horace Debenham	United Kingdom	Royal Flying Corps, Royal Air Force	6
François de Boigne	France	Aéronautique Militaire	6
Joseph De Bonnefoy	France	Aéronautique Militaire	6
Karl Deilman	German Empire	Luftstreitkräfte	6
Lionel de Marmier	France	Aéronautique Militaire	6
Alexander De Seversky	Russian Empire	Imperial Army Air Service	6
Andreas Dombrowski	Austro-Hungarian Empire	Luftfahrtruppen	6
John Elmer Drummond	Canada	Royal Flying Corps, Royal Air Force	6
Adolphe DuBois d'Aische	Kingdom of Belgium	Aéronautique Militaire	6
André Dubonnet	France	Aéronautique Militaire	6
Pierre Dufaur de Gavardie	France	Aéronautique Militaire	6
Denis Edwin Edgley	United Kingdom	Royal Flying Corps, Royal Air Force	6
Karl Engelfried	German Empire	Luftstreitkräfte	6
Cyril Askew Eyre	United Kingdom	Royal Naval Air Service	6
Robert Farquhar	United Kingdom	Royal Flying Corps, Royal Air Force	6
William Spurrett Fielding-Johnson	United Kingdom	Royal Flying Corps, Royal Air Force	6
John Pierce Findlay	United Kingdom	Royal Flying Corps, Royal Air Force	6
Alfred Fleischer	German Empire	Luftstreitkräfte	6
Guglielmo Fornagiari	Italy	Corpo Aeronautico Militare	6
Herbert Fowler	Canada	Royal Naval Air Service, Royal Air Force	6
Gustav Frädrich	German Empire	Luftstreitkräfte	6
Johann Frint	Austro-Hungarian Empire	Luftfahrtruppen	6
Daniel Galbraith	Canada	Royal Naval Air Service, Royal Air Force, Royal Canadian Air Force	6
George Gardiner	United Kingdom	Royal Flying Corps, Royal Air Force	6
Mieczyslaw Garsztka	German Empire	Luftstreitkräfte	6
Paul Gastin	France	Aéronautique Militaire	6
Rupert Gifford	United Kingdom	Royal Naval Air Service, Royal Air Force	6
Friedrich Gille	German Empire	Luftstreitkräfte	6
Hermann Gilly	German Empire	Luftstreitkräfte	6
Maurice Gond	France	Aéronautique Militaire	6
George H. D. Gossip	Australia	Royal Naval Air Service, Royal Air Force	6
Herbert Gould	United Kingdom	Royal Flying Corps, Royal Air Force	6
James Green	United Kingdom	Royal Flying Corps	6
Duncan Grinnell-Milne	United Kingdom	Royal Flying Corps, Royal Air Force	6
Murray Guthrie	United States	United States Army Air Service	6
Heinrich Haase	German Empire	Luftstreitkräfte	6
Erich Hahn	German Empire	Luftstreitkräfte	6
Alfred Haines	United Kingdom	Royal Flying Corps, Royal Air Force	6
David S. Hall	United Kingdom	Royal Flying Corps	6
Stanley Hamblin	United Kingdom	Royal Flying Corps, Royal Air Force	6
Leslie Hamilton	United Kingdom	Royal Flying Corps, Royal Air Force	6
Leonard Hammond	United States	United States Army Air Service	6
Frank Hays	United States	United States Army Air Service	6
Geoffrey Hemming	United Kingdom	Royal Naval Air Service, Royal Air Force	6
Marcel Henriot	France	Aéronautique Militaire	6
Albert Hets	German Empire	Luftstreitkräfte	6
Richard Alexander Hewat	United States	Royal Flying Corps, Royal Air Force	6
Cyril Heywood	United Kingdom	Royal Naval Air Service, Royal Air Force	6
Robert Hildebrandt	German Empire	Luftstreitkräfte	6
Walter G. R. Hinchliffe	United Kingdom	Royal Naval Air Service, Royal Air Force	6
Otto Höhne	German Empire	Luftstreitkräfte, Luftwaffe	6
Philip Holligan	United Kingdom	Royal Flying Corps, Royal Air Force	6
Donald Hudson	United States	United States Army Air Service	6
Frank Hudson	United Kingdom	Royal Flying Corps, Royal Air Force	6
Alfred Hübner	German Empire	Luftstreitkräfte	6
Victor Huston	United Kingdom	Royal Flying Corps, Royal Air Force	6
Hans Imelmann	German Empire	Luftstreitkräfte	6
Attilio Imolesi	Italy	Corpo Aeronautico Militare	6
David Ingalls	United States	United States Navy attached to Royal Air Force	6
Bruce Jackman	United Kingdom	Royal Flying Corps, Royal Air Force	6
H. S. Jackson	United Kingdom	Royal Naval Air Service, Royal Air Force	6
Johannes Jensen	German Empire	Luftstreitkräfte	6
Philip Andrew Johnston	Australia	Royal Naval Air Service	6
Erich Just	German Empire	Luftstreitkräfte	6
Willy Kahle	German Empire	Luftstreitkräfte	6
Max Kahlow	German Empire	Luftstreitkräfte	6
Alexander Kasza	Austro-Hungarian Empire	Luftfahrtruppen	6
James Alfred Keating	United States	United States Army Air Service attached to Royal Flying Corps, Royal Air Force	6
Noel Keeble	United Kingdom	Royal Naval Air Service, Royal Air Force	6
Ernest Tilton Sumpter Kelly	Canada	Royal Flying Corps, Royal Air Force	6
Otto Klaiber	German Empire	Luftstreitkräfte	6
Gustav Klaudat	German Empire	Luftstreitkräfte	6
Howard Knotts	United States	United States Army Air Service	6
Erich König	German Empire	Luftstreitkräfte	6
Kurt Küppers	German Empire	Luftstreitkräfte	6
Herman Kunz	German Empire	Luftstreitkräfte	6
George Lawson	Union of South Africa	Royal Flying Corps, Royal Air Force, South African Air Force	6
Alfred Lenz	German Empire	Luftstreitkräfte	6
André Robert Lévy	France	Aéronautique Militaire	6
Thomas Lewis	United Kingdom	Royal Flying Corps, Royal Air Force	6
H. Lindfield	United Kingdom	Royal Flying Corps, Royal Air Force	6
Robert Opie Lindsay	United States	United States Army Air Service, United States Army Air Corps	6
George Lingham	Australia	Royal Flying Corps, Royal Air Force	6
Alwyne Travers Loyd	United Kingdom	Royal Flying Corps	6
Ludwig Luer	German Empire	Luftstreitkräfte	6
Thomas Luke	United Kingdom	Royal Flying Corps, Royal Air Force	6
John Knox MacArthur	United States	United States Army Air Service	6
Andrew MacGregor	Union of South Africa	Royal Flying Corps, Royal Air Force	6
Cesare Magistrini	Italy	Corpo Aeronautico Militare	6
Garnet Malley	Australia	Australian Flying Corps	6
Friedrich Mallincrodt	German Empire	Luftstreitkräfte	6
Maxmillian Mare-Montembault	United Kingdom	Royal Flying Corps, Royal Air Force	6
Louis Martin	France	Aéronautique Militaire	6
T. W. Martin	United Kingdom	Royal Flying Corps	6
Heinrich Maushake	German Empire	Luftstreitkräfte	6
F. H. Maynard	New Zealand	Royal Naval Air Service, Royal Air Force	6
Malcolm McCall	United Kingdom	Royal Flying Corps, Royal Air Force	6
Robert McKenzie	Australia	Australian Flying Corps	6
Robert McLaughlin	United Kingdom	Royal Flying Corps, Royal Air Force	6
Oscar McMaking	United Kingdom	Royal Flying Corps	6
Leslie McRobert	United Kingdom	Royal Flying Corps, Royal Air Force	6
Earl Stanley Meek	Canada	Royal Flying Corps, Royal Air Force	6
William Meggitt	United Kingdom	Royal Flying Corps, Royal Air Force	6
Emil Meinecke	German Empire	Luftstreitkräfte	6
Frank Tremar Sibly Menendez	United Kingdom	Royal Flying Corps, Royal Air Force	6
Konrad Mettlich	German Empire	Luftstreitkräfte	6
William James Middleton	United Kingdom	Royal Flying Corps, Royal Air Force	6
Archibald Miller	United Kingdom	Royal Flying Corps	6
William Miller	United Kingdom	Royal Flying Corps, Royal Air Force	6
Norman Craig Millman	Canada	Royal Flying Corps, Royal Air Force	6
Laurence Minot	United Kingdom	Royal Flying Corps	6
Alfred Mohr	German Empire	Luftstreitkräfte	6
Hugh Fitzgerald Moore	United Kingdom	Royal Flying Corps, Royal Air Force	6
Guido Nardini	Italy	Corpo Aeronautico Militare	6
Gerald Ewart Nash	Canada	Royal Naval Air Service, Royal Air Force, Royal Canadian Air Force	6
Gustave Naudin	France	Aéronautique Militaire	6
Werner Niethammer	German Empire	Luftstreitkräfte	6
Karl Nikitsch	Austro-Hungarian Empire	Luftfahrtruppen	6
Hans Oberlander	German Empire	Luftstreitkräfte	6
Jan Olieslagers	Kingdom of Belgium	Aviation Militaire Belge	6
Luigi Olivi	Italy	Corpo Aeronautico Militare	6
Rudolf Otto	German Empire	Luftstreitkräfte	6
Ernest Edward Owen	United Kingdom	Royal Flying Corps, Royal Air Force	6
Augustus Paget	United Kingdom	Royal Flying Corps, Royal Air Force	6
Medley Parlee	Canada	Royal Flying Corps, Royal Air Force	6
Laurence Pearson	United Kingdom	Royal Flying Corps, Royal Air Force	6
Adolphe Pégoud	France	Aéronautique Militaire	6
Giorgio Pessi alias Guiliano Parvis	Italy	Corpo Aeronautico Militare	6
Franz Peter	Austro-Hungarian Empire	Luftfahrtruppen	6
David McKelvey Peterson	United States	Aéronautique Militaire, United States Army Air Service	6
Geoffrey Pidcock	United Kingdom	Royal Flying Corps, Royal Air Force	6
Cleo Pineau	United States	Royal Flying Corps, Royal Air Force	6
William Ponder	United States	Aéronautique Militaire, United States Army Air Service	6
Sydney Pope	United Kingdom	Royal Flying Corps, Royal Air Force	6
Frederick Powell	United Kingdom	Royal Flying Corps, Royal Air Force	6
Josef Pürer	Austro-Hungarian Empire	Luftfahrtruppen	6
Thomas G. Rae	Union of South Africa	Royal Air Force	6
Arthur Rahn	German Empire	Luftstreitkräfte	6
Richard Raymond-Barker	United Kingdom	Royal Flying Corps, Royal Air Force	6
Émile Régnier	France	Aéronautique Militaire	6
Alan Rice-Oxley	United Kingdom	Royal Flying Corps, Royal Air Force	6
Rudolf Rienau	German Empire	Luftstreitkräfte	6
Harry Rigby	Australia	Royal Flying Corps, Royal Air Force	6
Johann Risztics	Austro-Hungarian Empire	Luftfahrtruppen	6
Cosimo Rizzotto	Italy	Corpo Aeronautico Militare	6
Bogart Rogers	United States	Royal Flying Corps, Royal Air Force	6
Achille Rousseaux	France	Aéronautique Militaire	6
Cyril H. Sawyer	United Kingdom	Royal Flying Corps, Royal Air Force	6
Alfons Scheicher	German Empire	Luftstreitkräfte	6
Roman Schmidt	Austro-Hungarian Empire	Luftfahrtruppen	6
Karl Schmückle	German Empire	Luftstreitkräfte	6
Edgar Scholtz	German Empire	Luftstreitkräfte	6
Erich Schuetze	German Empire	Luftstreitkräfte	6
Wilhelm Schulz	German Empire	Luftstreitkräfte	6
Gunther Schuster	German Empire	Luftstreitkräfte	6
Laurence Henry Scott	United Kingdom	Royal Flying Corps, Royal Air Force	6
Heinrich Seywald	German Empire	Luftstreitkräfte	6
Evander Shapard	United States	Royal Flying Corps, Royal Air Force	6
Thomas Sharpe	United Kingdom	Royal Flying Corps, Royal Air Force	6
Edward A. Simpson	United Kingdom	Royal Flying Corps, Royal Air Force	6
David Esplin Smith	United Kingdom	Royal Flying Corps, Royal Air Force	6
John Smith-Grant	Union of South Africa	Royal Flying Corps, Royal Air Force	6
Cyril Richard Smythe	United Kingdom	Royal Flying Corps, Royal Air Force	6
Erich Sonneck	German Empire	Luftstreitkräfte	6
Constant Soulier	France	Aéronautique Militaire	6
Otto Splitgerber	German Empire	Luftstreitkräfte	6
Arthur Spurling	United Kingdom	Royal Flying Corps, Royal Air Force	6
Georg Staudacher	German Empire	Luftstreitkräfte	6
Mario Stoppani	Italy	Corpo Aeronautico Militare	6
William H. Stovall	United States	United States Army Air Service, United States Army Air Corps	6
William Strugnell	United Kingdom	Royal Flying Corps, Royal Air Force	6
Rothesay Stuart Wortley	United Kingdom	Royal Flying Corps, Royal Air Force	6
Kurt Student	German Empire	Luftstreitkräfte	6
Hermann Stutz	German Empire	Luftstreitkräfte	6
William Swayze	Canada	Royal Flying Corps, Royal Air Force	6
Ronald Sykes	United Kingdom	Royal Naval Air Service, Royal Air Force	6
Harry Symons	Canada	Royal Flying Corps, Royal Air Force	6
Cecil Thompson	Union of South Africa	Royal Flying Corps, Royal Air Force	6
Claud Robert James Thompson	Australia	Royal Flying Corps, Royal Air Force, Australian Flying Corps	6
Romolo Ticconi	Italy	Corpo Aeronautico Militare	6
Edgar Tobin	United States	United States Army Air Service	6
Albert Tonkin	Australia	Australian Flying Corps	6
James Hamilton Traill	Australia	Australian Flying Corps	6
George Trapp	Canada	Royal Naval Air Service	6
Reinhard Treptow	German Empire	Luftstreitkräfte	6
Philip Tudhope	Union of South Africa	Royal Flying Corps, Royal Air Force	6
Thomas Tuffield	United Kingdom	Royal Flying Corps, Royal Air Force	6
William Tyrell	United Kingdom	Royal Air Force	6
Konstantin Vakulovsky	Russian Empire	Imperial Army Air Service	6
Hermann Vallendor	German Empire	Luftstreitkräfte	6
Jerry Vasconcells	United States	United States Army Air Service	6
Remington Vernam	United States	Aéronautique Militaire, United States Army Air Service	6
Hans Waldhausen	German Empire	Luftstreitkräfte	6
Eric Walker	United Kingdom	Royal Flying Corps, Royal Air Force	6
Bernard Albert Walkerdine	United Kingdom	Royal Flying Corps, Royal Air Force	6
Stephen Reginald Parke Walter	United Kingdom	Royal Flying Corps	6
Harry Watson	Canada	Royal Flying Corps, Royal Air Force	6
Rudolf Weber	Austro-Hungarian Empire	Luftfahrtruppen	6
Joseph F. Wehner	United States	United States Army Air Service	6
William Weir	Australia	Australian Flying Corps	6
Heinrich Wessels	German Empire	Luftstreitkräfte	6
Siegfried Westphal	German Empire	Luftstreitkräfte	6
William Westwood	Union of South Africa	Royal Flying Corps, Royal Air Force	6
William A. Wheeler	United Kingdom	Royal Flying Corps, Royal Air Force	6
Victor White	United Kingdom	Royal Flying Corps, Royal Air Force	6
Ernst Wiehle	German Empire	Luftstreitkräfte	6
Frederick Wilton	United Kingdom	Royal Flying Corps, Royal Air Force	6
William Otto Braasch Winkler	United Kingdom	Royal Flying Corps, Royal Air Force	6
Harry Wood	Canada	Royal Flying Corps, Royal Air Force	6
