= Eric Betts =

Irish air officer of the British Royal Air Force

Air Vice-Marshal Eric Betts CBE DSC DFC
- Born: 24 January 1897; Dalkey, Dublin
- Died: 30 October 1971 (aged 74)
- Burial place: St Barrahane's Church, Castletownshend, County Cork, Ireland
- Military career
- Allegiance: United Kingdom
- Branch: Royal Navy (1915–18); Royal Air Force (1918–46)
- Service years: 1915–46
- Rank: Air Vice-Marshal
- Commands: No. 101 Squadron (1933–35)
- Conflicts: First World War: Western Front; Second World War
- Awards: Commander of the Order of the British Empire; Distinguished Service Cross; Distinguished Flying Cross; Croix de guerre (France); Grand Cross of the Order of the Phoenix (Greece)

Eric Bourne Coulter Betts (24 January 1897 – 30 October 1971) was an Irish air officer of the British Royal Air Force. He began his career in the Royal Naval Air Service during the First World War. He became a flying ace credited with six aerial victories, although acedom was incidental to his more important mission of long range photographic reconnaissance, for which he was decorated.

He remained in military service post-war, rising through the ranks of the Royal Air Force to group captain just before the Second World War began. As that war started, he was an influential participant in the United Kingdom's effort to gear up for the conflict; his sixteen early forecasts of needed personnel and logistic requirements for the Royal Air Force were accurate within a five percent margin.

Later in the war, having been promoted to air vice marshal, he was in charge of administration for Middle East Command. He retired in that rank post-war, on 10 March 1946.

== Early life ==
Eric Bourne Coulter Betts was born in Dalkey, Dublin, Ireland, on 24 January 1897.

== First World War service ==
Betts began his military service as a signalman in the Royal Naval Volunteer Reserve. He was commissioned as a temporary sub-lieutenant in the RNVR on 14 October 1915.

He was seconded for duty in the Royal Naval Air Service, and assigned to No. 2 (Naval) Squadron as an aerial observer. He gained his first confirmed aerial victory on 1 February 1917, while manning the guns in the rear seat of a Sopwith 1½ Strutter on a long range reconnaissance mission. He received the Distinguished Service Cross and the French Croix de guerre with Palm for this sortie. On 28 February, he was promoted to temporary lieutenant. By June, he was assigned to Hendon NAS; the Admiralty planned long range photographic reconnaissance of German naval bases to the west of the Kiel Canal, and Betts was selected to fly in the Airco DH.4 modified for this mission. Although the mission was cancelled, and the aircraft and air crews were reassigned to Great Yarmouth in August 1917, Betts' award citation for the Distinguished Flying Cross (DFC) credited him with more than 20 successful long range photo-reconnaissance missions.

He was promoted to flight observer on 31 December 1917, and remained with No. 2 Naval Squadron when it became No. 202 Squadron of the newly formed Royal Air Force on 1 April 1918. Teamed with Flight Lieutenant Noel Keeble, he scored five more aerial victories between 5 June and 16 September 1918.

=== List of aerial victories ===
While Betts' DFC citation, as rather an afterthought, noted aerial eight victories, only six accredited victories are known.

Sources
No.	Date/time	Aircraft	Opponent	Result	Location	Notes
1	1 February 1917 @ 1420 hours	Sopwith 1½ Strutter (9417)	Albatros D.II	Driven down out of control	Wendyne	Pilot: Flight Lieutenant Holden
2	5 June 1918 @ 1200 hours	Airco DH.4 (A7446)	Pfalz D.III	Destroyed	North of Eassen	Pilot: Flight Lieutenant Noel Keeble
3	9 June 1918	Airco DH.4 (A7446)	Albatros fighter	Destroyed	Maria-Aalter	Pilot: Flight Lieutenant Noel Keeble
4	10 August 1918 @ 1425 hours	Airco DH.4 (A7446)	Fokker D.VII	Driven down out of control	Bruges, Belgium	Pilot: Flight Lieutenant Noel Keeble
5	16 September 1918 @ 1105 hours	Airco DH.4 (A7446)	Pfalz D.XII	Destroyed	Benkemaere	Pilot: Flight Lieutenant Noel Keeble
6	16 September 1918 @ 1125 hours	Airco DH.4 (A7446)	Fokker D.VII	Set afire in midair; destroyed	Dudzele, Belgium	Pilot: Flight Lieutenant Noel Keeble

== Between the wars ==
Betts was granted a permanent commission in the RAF on 1 August 1919 with the rank of lieutenant. On 5 December 1919 he was posted to observer duty aboard the carrier HMS Pegasus, receiving promotion to flight lieutenant on 30 June 1921. On 28 February 1922 Betts left Pegasus, and was posted to the RAF Depot (Inland Area) as a supernumerary, before attending the RAF Staff College, Andover from 3 April 1922.

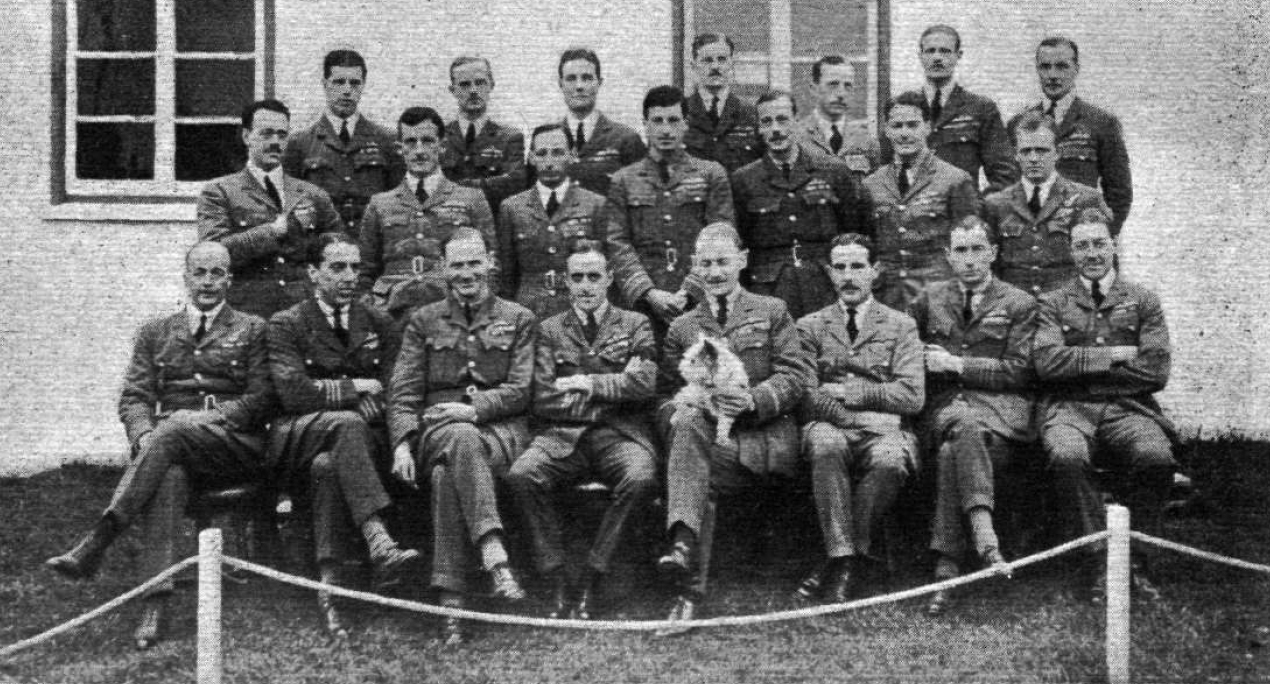
Staff and students at the first RAF Staff College course, 7 December 1922. (Flt. Lt. Betts, middle row far right.)

He was one of the first students at the Staff College, which had only just opened under the command of Air Commodore Robert Brooke-Popham. The Directing Staff included Air Commodore Robert Clark-Hall, Group Captain Philip Joubert de la Ferté, Wing Commanders Wilfrid Freeman and Charles Edmonds, and Squadron Leader Bertine Sutton, while Betts' fellow students included Wing Commanders Jack Baldwin and Richard Peirse, Squadron Leaders Conway Pulford, Keith Park, Wilfred McClaughry and Charles Portal, and Flight Lieutenants Harold Kerby and John Cole-Hamilton.

On 4 April 1923, he began pilot's training at No. 1 Flying Training School. On 17 September 1923, he began staff duty at Headquarters, Inland Area. From there, he moved on to become a Qualified Flying Instructor at No. 3 Flying Training School, RAF Spitalgate, on 20 March 1928. While there, he was promoted to squadron leader on 29 May 1929.

Betts went upon foreign service next, being assigned to the Air Staff at Headquarters, British Forces Aden on 16 November 1929. He would remain there until being returned to Britain and deemed supernumerary on 5 March 1932. After a spell on half pay in May and June 1932, he returned to staff duty, this time in the Wessex Bombing Area, starting on 8 August 1932. After that, he was given command of No. 101 (Bomber) Squadron RAF on 21 December 1933.

On 1 January 1936, he was promoted to wing commander. On 14 January, he returned to staff work, in the Deputy Directorate of War Organization. On 1 April 1939, Betts was promoted to group captain, becoming the Deputy Director of War Organisation.

== Second World War and beyond ==
In 1939, as war began, he was a member of the committee tasked with delivering British aircraft, including Fairey Battles, Hawker Hurricanes, and Supermarine Spitfires, to beleaguered Poland; however, that nation was conquered by the Germans before the aircraft could be supplied. Beginning in September 1939, and running through May 1940, he was then required to make 16 war planning forecasts for logistics and personnel requirements for the RAF to fight the Second World War. These forecasts were exceptionally accurate, with only two having so much as a five percent error.

On 1 January 1941, Betts was gazetted "for valuable services rendered in connection with the war." A promotion to temporary air commodore followed, on 1 April 1941.

Later in 1941, before the attack on Pearl Harbor brought the United States into the war, he was involved in high level negotiations for ferrying Lend Lease aircraft from the U. S. to British control.

He was promoted to acting air vice-marshal on 14 March 1943, and served as Air Officer in Charge of Administration, Middle East Command, from 26 March. He was promoted to the war substantive rank of air commodore on 14 March 1944, and then to air commodore on 1 December 1944, retaining his rank of acting air vice-marshal until 16 December 1944, following his return to England early that month. He received a mention in despatches on 1 January 1945.

Betts finally retired from the RAF on 10 March 1946, retaining the rank of air vice-marshal. He died on 30 March 1971, and is buried alongside his wife in the churchyard of St Barrahane's Church of Ireland, Castletownshend, County Cork.

== Honours and awards ==
- Distinguished Service Cross – 21 April 1917.

Sub-Lieutenant (now Lieutenant) Eric Bourne Coulter Betts, RNVR.

"In recognition of his services on the 1 February 1917, when he carried out a long reconnaissance and returned with extremely important information, shooting down an enemy scout machine which attacked him on his way back."

- Croix de Guerre (France) – 20 July 1917.

Observer-Lieutenant E. B. C. Betts, RNAS.

"Conferred by the President of the French Republic for distinguished services rendered during the war".

- Distinguished Flying Cross – 21 September 1918.

Captain Eric Bourne Coulter Betts, DSC. (Sea Patrol).

"An observer officer of great skill who has carried out over 20 long-distance photographic reconnaissances during the past four months, and in conjunction with his pilot, has brought home about 1,000 photographs of enemy positions of inestimable value, in addition to destroying eight enemy machines."

- Croix de Guerre with Palm (France) – 16 December 1919.
- Commander of the Order of the British Empire – 2 June 1943.
- Mentioned in Despatches – 1 January 1945.
- Grand Officer of the Order of the Phoenix (Greece) – 6 September 1946.
