= Reginald Charley =

British flying ace

Reginald Morse Charley
- Born: 2 August 1892; Blakeney, Gloucestershire, England
- Died: 1986 (aged 93–94); Yorkshire, England
- Military career
- Allegiance: United Kingdom
- Branch: British Army; Royal Air Force
- Service years: 1916–1919
- Rank: Captain
- Nickname: Reg
- Units: No. 59 Squadron RFC; No. 54 Squadron RFC
- Awards: Military Cross; Croix de Guerre (France)

Captain Reginald Morse Charley MC (2 August 1892 – 1986) was a British World War I flying ace credited with six aerial victories.

== Biography ==
Charley was born in Blakeney, Gloucestershire, the son of James Smith and Eva (née Morse) Charley. He attended Bristol University qualifying as an electrical engineer in 1911. He eventually travelled to the United States to accept a job in Pittsburgh, Pennsylvania, arriving in New York City on 1 February 1914.

Charley received his flying training in the United States, being awarded Aero Club of America Certificate No. 486 on 2 May 1916 from the Atlantic Coast Aeronautic School at Newport News, Virginia, flying a Curtiss biplane. He then travelled to England, where he was appointed a probationary second lieutenant in the Royal Flying Corps on 14 June 1916, and was posted to No. 59 Squadron. He was appointed a flying officer on 30 September, was confirmed in his rank on 17 October, and in December was transferred to No. 54 Squadron, and sent to France.

Flying the Sopwith Pup, Charley gained his first victory on 5 April 1917, destroying an observation balloon over Gouy, shared with Capt. R.G.H. Pixley, Capt. Frank Hudson and Lt. Maurice Scott; his second came on 26 April when he shot down an Albatros D.III over Prémont. Charley was promoted to lieutenant on 1 July. On 13 July he shot down another D.III, and on 5 September destroyed an Albatros D.V near Slype. On 11 September he shot down another D.V near Ostend, and claimed another D.III (unconfirmed). The same day he was appointed a flight commander with the temporary rank of captain. On 12 November he shot down an Albatros D near Westende, for his sixth and final victory. He then returned to England, and was transferred to Home Establishment to serve for the remainder of the war at the Armament Experimental Station.

On 18 January 1918 Charley was awarded the Military Cross. His citation read:

Lieutenant (Temporary Captain) Reginald M. Charley, Royal Flying Corps (Special Reserve)
For conspicuous gallantry and devotion to duty. He attacked a hostile balloon which was eventually brought down in flames. With four other pilots he attacked eight enemy scouts and drove two down. He has driven down four other enemy aircraft, usually fighting with his patrol against greatly superior numbers.

In April 1918 he was awarded the French Croix de Guerre.

On 10 December 1919 Charley relinquished his commission on account of ill-health contracted on active service, and was permitted to retain his rank.

After his discharge, he returned to America to work as a Transformer Sales Manager for the English Electric Company. He retired in 1960, and died in 1986, shortly after his 94th birthday.

== Personal life ==
Charley married Mary Elizabeth Slawter, of East Pittsburgh, in November 1917. Their son, David James Charley (1918–2008), qualified as a doctor, served in the Royal Navy during World War II, and later became a noted specialist in respiratory disease, being elected a Fellow of the Royal College of Physicians (FRCP) in 1973, and made an Officer of the Order of the British Empire (OBE) in 1977.
