= Oliver Sutton (RAF officer) =

British First World War flying ace

Oliver Manners Sutton
- Born: 12 March 1896; Westbourne, Sussex, England
- Died: 16 August 1921 (aged 25); RAF Martlesham Heath, Suffolk, England
- Burial place: Saint Michael and All Angels, Withyham, Sussex, England; 51°06′00″N 0°07′57″E
- Military career
- Allegiance: United Kingdom
- Branch: British Army; Royal Air Force
- Service years: 1914–1921
- Rank: Captain
- Units: South Lancashire Regiment; No. 21 Squadron RFC; No. 54 Squadron RFC; No. 28 Squadron RAF
- Conflicts: World War I • Western Front • Italian Front
- Awards: Military Cross

Captain Oliver Manners Sutton MC (12 March 1896 – 16 August 1921) was a British First World War flying ace credited with seven aerial victories.

== Family background and education ==
Sutton was born in Westbourne, Sussex, the fourth son of Algernon Charles Sutton (1852–1932) and his wife Winifred Alice (née Fell) (1863–1956). He was a direct descendant of Sir Richard Sutton Bt, MP, (1733–1802), and distantly related to the Dukes of Rutland. He was educated at Tonbridge School, Kent.

== World War I ==
Sutton enlisted into a Public Schools Battalion in 1914, but was soon transferred to the Officers' Training Corps as a cadet. He was commissioned as a second lieutenant (on probation) on 6 February 1915, and posted to the 3rd (Reserve) Battalion, South Lancashire Regiment, where he was confirmed in his rank on 22 July 1915. He served in France from 1 June, attached to the 1st Battalion, Loyal North Lancashire Regiment, until severely wounded at the Battle of Loos in late 1915.

After recovering from his injuries, Sutton trained as a pilot. He was promoted to lieutenant on 7 August 1916, and was granted his Royal Aero Club Aviator's Certificate on 23 September 1916, and appointed a flying officer in the Royal Flying Corps the same day.

He first served in France with No. 21 Squadron RFC, flying the R.E.8 two-seater, before transferring to No. 54 Squadron RFC to fly the Sopwith Pup single-seat fighter. He gained his first aerial victory on 2 April 1917, driving down an enemy reconnaissance aircraft out of control. He shared with other pilots of his squadron in the destruction of another reconnaissance aircraft on 11 May, then destroyed an Albatros D.III fighter solo on 24 May. He shared in the destruction of another D.III on 1 June 1917, then drove down and destroyed two more solo on 5 and 6 June, bringing his total to six.

Sutton was appointed a flight commander with the acting rank of captain on 10 July 1917, and on 24 July his award of the Military Cross was gazetted. His citation read:

Lieutenant Oliver Manners Sutton, South Lancashire Regiment, Special Reserve, and Royal Flying Corps.

"For conspicuous gallantry and devotion to duty. On at least eight separate occasions he showed great determination in attacking hostile aircraft, destroying them or driving them down out of control, and he has also done very good work in other flights by preventing hostile aircraft from getting on the tails of other machines. On one occasion, though his gun jammed, he dived three times and drove off an enemy machine."

Sutton later transferred to No. 28 Squadron RAF to serve in Italy, flying a Sopwith Camel, where on 15 August 1918 he gained his seventh and final victory by driving down an enemy fighter out of control.

=== List of aerial victories ===
Combat record
No.	Date/Time	Aircraft/ Serial No.	Opponent	Result	Location	Notes
No. 54 Squadron RFC
1	2 April 1917 @ 0800	Sopwith Pup (A637)	Type C	Out of control	East of Péronne	
2	11 May 1917 @ 1840	Sopwith Pup (A6183)	Type C	Destroyed	Walincourt	Shared with Major C. E. Sutcliffe, Captain William Strugnell, and Lieutenants Maurice Scott, E. J. Y. Grevelink & M. B. Cole.
3	24 May 1917 @ 0810	Sopwith Pup (A6183)	Albatros D.III	Destroyed	Prémont	
4	1 June 1917 @ 1125	Sopwith Pup (A6183)	Albatros D.III	Destroyed	Honnecourt	Shared with Lieutenant Maurice Scott.
5	5 June 1917 @ 0700	Sopwith Pup (A6183)	Albatros D.III	Out of control	Brebières	
6	6 June 1917 @ 1200	Sopwith Pup (A6183)	Albatros D.III	Destroyed	South-west of Cambrai	
No. 28 Squadron RAF
7	15 August 1918 @ 1200	Sopwith Camel (B6344)	Type D	Out of control	4 kilometres (2.5 mi) south-east of Feltre	

== Post-war career and death ==
After the armistice Sutton served with the Inter-Allied Commission of Control in Germany. On 1 August 1919 he was granted a permanent commission in the RAF with the rank of captain, and relinquished his army commission the same day.

On 16 August 1921, Sutton was the pilot of the Bristol Braemar C4297, a prototype heavy bomber, which crashed on takeoff and hit a hangar at the Aeroplane Experimental Establishment at RAF Martlesham Heath, Suffolk. Of the four on board Sutton and Aircraftsman Charles Sheridan were killed, one crewman was injured, and another escaped unhurt. On 20 August Sutton was buried with military honours at Saint Michael and All Angels, Withyham, Sussex, England.
