= Pierre Mus =

Pierre Mus (14 December 1869 - ?) OBE was a Belgian spy during World War I. Two of his brothers, Gustaaf and François, were executed by the Germans for the same activities.

== Biography ==
Pierre Mus was one of seven children of Michiel Mus and mother Nathalie Vandendriessche, living in Dudzele (now a part of Bruges). His parents ran a bar annex shop, where Michiel worked as a barber and tailor as well. By the start of World War I Pierre was a married man with three children, and worked as a tailor for the Belgian gendarmerie in Etterbeek near Brussels. Soon after the start of the war he became involved in espionage and sabotage, most active in the region Brussels-Courtrai before he joined the so-called Service des Ambulants in Ghent, where his brother Gustaaf was one of the leading figures. He was arrested in December 1914 but got rid of incriminating papers just in time. He was released one month later for lack of evidence.

He was instructed to spy in the coastal region, mainly around the port of Zeebrugge where German warships and submarines were repaired. To help with this task he enlisted others as spies, including his brother Alphonse, his brother-in-law Jules Desloovere, and the former gendarme Charles Titeca. Both Titeca and Desloovere were executed in 1916.

In April 1916, Pierre Mus tried to escape Belgium and get to Vlissingen in the Netherlands, to deliver information about the German defenses in and around Zeebrugge. He was arrested by a German guard near the border, but succeeded in stabbing him to death before escaping across the border.

On 26 September 1916, Mus sabotaged the Coast tram, which runs along the length of the Belgian coast and was popular with German soldiers. Mus, helped by the conductor and wattman on the bus and the guard of a bridge, succeeded in sabotaging the bridge, causing the tram to derail and fall in the water. 44 Germans died in the crash. The 4 saboteurs fled, but while the others reached the Netherlands, Mus had to hide in Belgium as he was now one of the most wanted men in the country, having been sentenced to death twice already.

While Mus went into hiding, most others members of his group were arrested by the Germans, who obtained their names from some traitors. 5 Members of the group were executed on 25 June 1917. Pierre Mus tried to actively help the war effort though, and late in 1917 he succeeded in obtaining photographs of the most detailed map of the Belgian coast, a document of 21 metres long by 75 cm wide which was kept in the University of Ghent. He got access to the map through professor Camille Pholien, another member of the Belgian resistance.

In 1920, Pierre Mus received the Order of the British Empire. He also was decorated with the Legion d'Honneur and the Leopoldsorde.

== François Mus ==
François Mus was born in Dudzele on 18 November 1887. Before the war, he was a postman. He became a leader of the resistance as well, heading groups in Brabant and Hainaut. He was arrested on 21 April 1915 with his wife and daughter, while his brother Pierre barely escaped. While François' wife and daughter were released a few weeks later, he was sentenced to death and executed on 5 September 1915 together with two other agents.

== Gustaaf Mus ==
Gustaaf Mus was born in Dudzele on 17 July 1891, the youngest of the seven children. He was a non-commissioned officer in the Belgian gendarmerie, and a talented amateur cyclist with the Alcyon (cycling team), before the outbreak of World War I in 1914. He was seriously wounded (a shot broke his leg) while fighting against the Germans, and was evacuated to a British hospital. There he was recruited in May 1915 by Joseph Mage, director of the Belgian Security forces in England. He was smuggled back to Belgium and became one of the core members of the Service des Ambulants espionage and sabotage group (especially sabotaging trains), led by Alfred Algoet. Mus became the leader of the group in East- and West-Flanders, heading the efforts of more than 100 men and women.

He was arrested by the Germans on 31 March 1916 after a member of his group had betrayed them to the authorities. Gustaaf Mus was executed in Ghent on 11 August 1916, together with Algoet and four others.
