= Maurice D. G. Scott =

British World War I flying ace (1895–1918)

Maurice Douglas Guest Scott
- Born: 13 November 1895; Mussoorie, Bengal Presidency, India
- Died: 17 March 1918 (aged 22); Shoreham, Sussex, England
- Burial place: All Saints' Church, Ockbrook Derbyshire, England; 52°55′2″N 1°22′16″W
- Military career
- Allegiance: United Kingdom
- Branch: British Army
- Service years: 1914–1918
- Rank: Captain
- Units: Loyal North Lancashire Regiment; No. 18 Squadron RFC; No. 54 Squadron RFC; No. 46 Squadron RFC; No. 91 Squadron RFC
- Conflicts: World War I; Western Front
- Awards: Military Cross

Captain Maurice Douglas Guest Scott MC (13 November 1895 – 17 March 1918) was a British World War I flying ace credited with twelve official victories, including one observation balloon, while a member of the Royal Flying Corps. He scored as both an aerial observer and a pilot; he was successful while serving with three different squadrons.

== Early life ==
Scott was born in Mussoorie, Bengal Presidency, India, the second son of Philip William Scott (1865–1910), a civil engineer employed by the Eastern Bengal Railway, and Agnes Mary (née Kirkham) (1865–1932). Following his father's death the family returned to England. In the 1911 census he is recorded as living in Bedford with his mother, his brother Percy (1893–1914), and his aunt Emily, but by 1914 the family were resident in Borrowash, Derbyshire.

His name appears on the War Memorial at Derby station for No. 8 Shop, Derby, suggesting that he also worked for the Midland Railway.

== World War I service ==
After serving as a cadet in the Officers' Training Corps, Scott was commissioned as a temporary second lieutenant (on probation) in the 3rd Battalion, The Loyal North Lancashire Regiment on 14 November 1914. He was confirmed in his rank on 1 October 1915.

Scott was seconded to the Royal Flying Corps in February 1916, and after completing his aerial gunnery training was appointed a flying officer (observer) on 21 May. He was posted to No. 18 Squadron to fly in the Vickers Gunbus two-seater fighter. On 3 April 1916, he was credited with capturing a German two-seater reconnaissance aircraft at Souchez.

He would subsequently train as a pilot, being appointed a flying officer on 16 October 1916, with seniority from 21 May. He was then posted to No. 54 Squadron to fly the Sopwith Pup single-seat fighter. On 5 April 1917, he shared with Frank Hudson, Reginald Charley, and another pilot, in the destruction of a German observation balloon. On 9 May 1917, he destroyed another enemy two-seater. Two days later, Scott shared with William Strugnell, Oliver Sutton, and three other squadron mates, in the destruction of an enemy reconnaissance aircraft. On 1 June, Scott and Sutton drove an Albatros D.III fighter down out of control over Honnecourt, and Scott became an ace.

He subsequently transferred to No. 46 Squadron and was appointed a flight commander, with the acting rank of captain, on 21 June 1917.

He began a string of seven wins on 4 September 1917, sharing with four others in the driving down of an Albatros two-seater south of Scarpe. He would gain six more wins that month, destroying a DFW reconnaissance aircraft, and driving down two Albatros D.Vs and two German reconnaissance aircraft. He was awarded the Military Cross on 27 October 1917. On 8 October 1917, he was relieved from combat duty to return to Home Establishment, where on 1 November 1917 he was appointed a Group Instructor in Gunnery (graded as a flight commander).

Scott was killed in a flying accident at Shoreham, Sussex, on 17 March 1918, and is buried at All Saints' Church, Ockbrook, Derbyshire.

=== List of aerial victories ===
Combat record
No.	Date/time	Aircraft/ Serial No.	Opponent	Result	Location	Notes
No. 18 Squadron RFC
1	3 April 1916; 1015	Vickers F.B.5 (2882)	Type C	Captured	Souchez	
No. 54 Squadron RFC
2	5 April 1917	Sopwith Pup	Balloon	Destroyed	Gouy	Shared with Captains Frank Hudson & R. G. H. Pixley, and 2nd Lieutenant Reginald Charley.
3	9 May 1917; 1530	Sopwith Pup (A7330)	Type C	Destroyed	Séranvillers	
4	11 May 1917; 1840	Sopwith Pup (A6165)	Type C	Destroyed	Walincourt	Shared with Major C. E. Sutcliffe, Captain William Strugnell, and Lieutenants Oliver Sutton, E. J. Y. Grevelink, & M. B. Cole.
5	1 June 1917; 1135	Sopwith Pup (A7330)	Albatros D.III	Out of control	Honnecourt	Shared with Lieutenant Oliver Sutton.
No. 46 Squadron RFC
6	4 September 1917; 0930	Sopwith Pup (B1843)	Albatros C	Out of control	South of Scarpe	Shared with Lieutenants Charles Odell, E. Armitage, C. Courtneidge and Eric Hughes.
7	11 September 1917; 1055	Sopwith Pup (B2191)	Type C	Out of control	South of Scarpe	
8	21 September 1917; 0820	Sopwith Pup (B2191)	Type C	Out of control	South of Scarpe	
9	22 September 1917; 1030	Sopwith Pup (B2191)	Albatros D.V	Out of control	Sailly-en-Ostrevent	
10	24 September 1917; 1030	Sopwith Pup (B2191)	DFW C	Destroyed	South-east of Honnecourt	
11	30 September 1917; 1630-1636	Sopwith Pup (B2191)	Albatros D.V	Out of control	Vitry	
12	30 September 1917; 1630-1636	Sopwith Pup (B2191)	Albatros D.V	Out of control	Vitry	

== Honours and awards ==
Military Cross
Lieutenant (Temporary Captain) Maurice Douglas Guest Scott, North Lancashire Regiment, Special Reserve, and Royal Flying Corps.

"For conspicuous gallantry and devotion to duty in aerial combats. On one occasion his patrol encountered seven enemy machines, two of which he drove down out of control. He has destroyed eleven enemy aeroplanes, and proved himself a very dashing patrol leader."

== Bibliography ==
- Franks, Norman (2005). Sopwith Pup Aces of World War 1: Volume 67 of Osprey Aircraft of the Aces: Issue 67 of Aircraft of the Aces. Oxford, UK: Osprey Publishing. ISBN 978-1-84176-886-1.
