= Laurence Minot =

Laurence Minot may refer to:

- Laurence Minot (poet) (1300–1352), English poet
- Laurence Minot (RFC officer) (1896–1917), British World War I flying ace
