= Gordon Fox Rule =

English Brazilian flying ace

- Born: 16 August 1898; São Paulo, Brazil
- Died: 10 June 1987 (aged 88); São Paulo, Brazil
- Military career
- Allegiance: United Kingdom
- Branch: British Army; Royal Air Force
- Service years: 1917–1921
- Rank: Captain
- Units: No. 49 Squadron RFC/RAF; No. 100 Squadron RAF; No. 141 Squadron RAF
- Conflicts: World War I; Western Front; Irish War of Independence
- Awards: Distinguished Flying Cross; Croix de guerre (France)

Captain Gordon Fox Rule (or Fox-Rule) DFC (16 August 1898 – 10 June 1987) was an English Brazilian First World War flying ace credited with seven aerial victories.

== Early life and background ==
Fox Rule was born in São Paulo, Brazil, but was educated at Eastbourne College, in England, between 1914 and 1916. His mother was English and his father Brazilian, but descended from an ancient Scottish family originating in the Valley of the Rule in Roxburghshire.

== Military service ==
Fox Rule joined the Royal Flying Corps as a cadet in early 1917, was commissioned as temporary second lieutenant (on probation) on 5 July 1917. He was confirmed in his rank on 31 August, and joined No. 49 Squadron RFC on 26 November 1917. His squadron was initially equipped with the Airco DH.4 light bomber, in which he gained his first two victories, driving down German reconnaissance aircraft in early March 1918. On 1 April 1918, the Royal Flying Corps and the Royal Naval Air Service were merged to form the Royal Air Force, and later that month his squadron was re-equipped with the Airco DH.9. On 15 May 1918 Fox Rule was appointed a flight commander with the acting rank of captain. In June he gained three more aerial victories, driving down two Albatros D.Vs, and shooting another down in flames. In July he sent a Fokker D.VII down out of control, and another in early August, bringing his total to seven. Fox Rule left No. 49 Squadron on 14 August 1918, and returned to the Home Establishment in the UK to serve as an instructor.

On 20 September 1918 his award of the Distinguished Flying Cross was gazetted, his citation reading:

Lieutenant (Temporary Captain) Gordon Fox-Rule.

"Whilst on a bombing raid this officer dived to 100 feet (30 m) and obtained a direct hit on a bridge, completely destroying it. Seeing a body of the enemy on the bank of the river he attacked them, causing them to disperse in disorder. He was then attacked by five biplanes; these he drove off, though his observer had been hit twice, and he landed safely at a French aerodrome. In all, he has taken part in thirty bomb raids and ten photographic reconnaissances, invariably displaying a marked offensive spirit."

He also received the Croix de guerre with palm from France in 1918.

=== List of aerial victories ===
Combat record
No.	Date/Time	Aircraft/ Serial No.	Opponent	Result	Location	Notes
1	8 March 1918 @ 1315	DH.4 (A7705)	Rumpler C	Out of control	Brebières	Observer: Second Lieutenant Philip Holligan.
2	10 March 1918 @ 1400	DH.4 (A7705)	LVG C	Out of control	Marquion	Observer: Second Lieutenant Philip Holligan.
3	7 June 1918 @ 1045	DH.9 (D5576)	Albatros D.V	Out of control	Flavy-le-Martel	Observer: Lieutenant E. H. Tredcraft.
4	10 June 1918 @ 0440	DH.9 (D1715)	Albatros D.V	Destroyed in flames	Assainvillers	Observer: Lieutenant E. H. Tredcraft.
5	10 June 1918 @ 0440	DH.9 (D1715)	Albatros D.V	Out of control	Assainvillers	Observer: Lieutenant E. H. Tredcraft.
6	25 July 1918 @ 1900	DH.9 (D1715)	Fokker D.VII	Out of control	Fismes	Observer: Lieutenant R. A. V. R. Scherk.
7	9 August 1918 @ 1700	DH.9 (D1715)	Fokker D.VII	Out of control	Marchélepot	Observer: Second Lieutenant S. P. Scott.

== Post-war service ==
Fox Rule was transferred to the RAF's unemployed list on 13 March 1919, but on 24 October 1919 was granted a short service commission with the rank of flying officer, and served in the Irish Republic during the War of Independence, flying Bristol F.2 fighters with No. 100 and No. 141 Squadrons. On 29 June 1921 Fox Rule relinquished his commission "on account of ill-health contracted in the Service", and was granted the rank of captain.

== Post-war life ==
Fox Rule returned to Brazil, where he became the head of the Central Office in São Paulo of the Companhia de Terras Norte Paraná ("The Northern Lands of Paraná Company"), founded in 1925 to open up the northern part of Paraná State in southern Brazil, though almost entirely funded by British shareholders. It would eventually colonize about 13,166 square kilometres (5,083 sq mi), founding 63 towns and selling over 41,700 parcels of land for farming, and about 70,000 urban plots. In 1944 the company changed its name to Companhia Melhoramentos Norte do Paraná ("Company for the Improvement of Northern Paraná").

Fox Rule was also a leading member of the São Paulo Athletic Club, helping introduce Rugby Union to Brazil, with the first recorded match taking place in 1926.

In 1984 Fox Rule donated his collection of mementos, photographs and documents covering his military career to the Imperial War Museum in London.
