= Frank Hudson (RAF officer) =

British World War I flying ace (1897–1922)

Frank Neville Hudson
- Born: 4 November 1897; Beckenham, Kent, England
- Died: 6 June 1922 (aged 24); Iraq
- Burial place: Ma'asker Al Raschid RAF Cemetery, Baghdad, Iraq
- Military career
- Allegiance: United Kingdom
- Branch: British Army; Royal Air Force
- Service years: 1915–1922
- Rank: Flight lieutenant
- Units: Buffs (East Kent Regiment); No. 15 Squadron RFC; No. 54 Squadron RFC/RAF; No. 6 Squadron RAF
- Conflicts: World War I • Western Front
- Awards: Military Cross

Flight Lieutenant Frank Neville Hudson MC (4 November 1897 – 6 June 1922) was a British World War I flying ace credited with six aerial victories.

== Biography ==
=== World War I ===
After passing out as a "Gentlemen Cadet" from the Royal Military College, Sandhurst, Hudson was commissioned as a second lieutenant in the Buffs (East Kent Regiment) on 15 September 1915. He was immediately seconded to the Royal Flying Corps, being granted Royal Aero Club Aviators' Certificate No. 1830 on 6 October, after flying a Maurice Farman biplane at the Military Flying School at Farnborough, and was appointed a flying officer on 10 November.

Assigned to No. 15 Squadron, Hudson was wounded in action on 21 February 1916, and was subsequently awarded the Military Cross on 30 March for "conspicuous gallantry and skill on several occasions notably when, although severely wounded in the head, he successfully completed his aerial reconnaissance. After recrossing the line and landing at an aerodrome, he at once lost consciousness. This young officer is only 18 years of age, but has many times driven off enemy machines and twice forced them to the ground."

After recovering from his injuries, Hudson eventually returned to active duty in No. 54 Squadron, flying the Sopwith Pup. He gained his first victory by sending an enemy reconnaissance aircraft down in flames over Courcelette on 27 January 1917, and drove down another on 13 February. On 4 March he was appointed a flight commander with the acting-rank of captain. On 5 April, Hudson, with Captain R. G. H. Pixley, Lieutenant Maurice Scott and 2nd Lieutenant Reginald Charley, shared in the destruction of an observation balloon at Gouy. Hudson went on to drive down two more enemy aircraft in that month. He had been promoted to temporary lieutenant on 1 February, but had to wait until 1 July until it was made permanent. He gained his sixth and final victory by destroying an Albatros C on 11 July.

Two days later, on 13 July, Hudson was shot down between Bruges and Ostend by aircraft from Jasta 20. Initially reported as missing, it was not until September his father, Frank Hudson, of Park Langley, Beckenham, received notification that his son was unwounded and a prisoner of war at Karlsruhe. Hudson remained a POW until after the armistice in November 1918, and in December 1919 received a mention in despatches "for valuable services whilst in captivity".

=== Post war ===
On 1 August 1919 Hudson was granted a permanent commission as a lieutenant in the Royal Air Force, relinquishing his Army commission in the Buffs the same day. On 1 January 1921 he was promoted from flying officer to flight lieutenant. He was transferred from the RAF Cadet College (Flying Wing) at Cranwell to No. 6 Squadron, based in Iraq, on 24 February 1922.

On 31 May of that year, he crashed his Bristol F2b on landing, and died from his injuries on 6 June 1922. He is buried in Ma'asker Al Raschid RAF Cemetery just outside Baghdad.
