= Laurence Henry Scott =

British WWI flying ace (1896–??)

- Born: 9 March 1896; Chipping Barnet, Hertfordshire, England
- Died: Unknown
- Military career
- Allegiance: United Kingdom
- Branch: British Army; Royal Air Force
- Service years: 1914–1921
- Rank: Captain
- Units: London Regiment; Middlesex Regiment; No. 20 Squadron RFC
- Conflicts: World War I • Western Front
- Awards: Military Cross

Captain Laurence Henry Scott MC (born 9 March 1896, date of death unknown) was a British World War I flying ace credited with six aerial victories.

== Military service ==
Scott first served as a private in the 14th (County of London) Battalion, The London Regiment (London Scottish), Territorial Force, until commissioned as a second lieutenant in the 8th Battalion, The Duke of Cambridge's Own (Middlesex Regiment) on 26 February 1915. On 27 September 1916 he was seconded for duty with the Royal Flying Corps, and appointed a flying officer (observer).

He was posted to No. 20 Squadron RFC to fly with Captain George Reid, as observer/gunner in a F.E.2b fighter/reconnaissance aircraft. Between 29 July and 21 October 1916 Scott and Reid accounted for four enemy aircraft destroyed (one shared) and two driven down out of control.

Scott was promoted to lieutenant on 1 November 1916, and his award of the Military Cross was gazetted soon after on 24 November. His citation read:

2nd Lt. Laurence Henry Scott, Middlesex Regiment.

"For conspicuous gallantry in action. He and his pilot pursued a hostile aeroplane for some six miles into the enemy's territory and there shot it down. He has on many previous occasions done very fine work."

On 13 July 1917 Scott was appointed an assistant instructor in gunnery (graded as an equipment officer, 2nd class). and on 1 January 1918 was appointed an instructor in gunnery (equipment officer, 1st class) with the acting rank of captain.

He was transferred to the RAF's unemployed list on 20 April 1919, returning to serve in the 8th Battalion, Middlesex Regiment, until finally relinquishing his commission on completion of service on 1 September 1921.
