= Philip Holligan =

British flying ace

Philip Terence Holligan
- Born: 20 May 1898; Clapham, London, England
- Died: 29 July 1986 (aged 88); Málaga, Andalusia, Spain
- Military career
- Allegiance: United Kingdom
- Branch: British Army; Royal Air Force
- Service years: 1917–1919
- Rank: Lieutenant
- Unit: No. 49 Squadron RAF
- Awards: Distinguished Flying Cross

Lieutenant Philip Terence Holligan DFC (20 May 1898 – 29 July 1986) was a British World War I flying ace credited with six aerial victories.

== Military service ==
Holligan was commissioned as temporary second lieutenant (on probation) in the Royal Flying Corps on 29 August 1917, and was confirmed in his rank, with seniority from 14 December 1917, on 14 March 1918.

Holligan was posted to No. 49 Squadron in France, as an observer/gunner in a DH.9 bomber. He gained his first victory on 8 March 1918, flying with pilot Second Lieutenant Gordon Fox Rule, by driving down a Rumpler C reconnaissance aircraft over Brebières. Two days later, on 10 March, Holligan and Fox Rule drove down another reconnaissance aircraft, a LVG C, over Marquion. His third victory came on 23 April, with pilot Lieutenant A. H. Curtiss, shooting down an Albatros D.V east of Nieuport. Holligan's final three victories came on 8 and 9 August, all Fokker D.VIIs, with pilot Captain Clifford Bowman, over Béthencourt, Falvy and Marchélepot.

In November 1918 he was awarded the Distinguished Flying Cross, his citation reading:

Lieutenant Philip Terence Holligan.

This officer has taken part in fifty bomb raids and photographic reconnaissances, and has rendered valuable and gallant service. During the battle of the Marne his reports regarding enemy movements, positions of batteries and troops were exceptionally full and accurate and were of the greatest value.

Holligan finally left the RAF, being transferred to the unemployed list on 1 February 1919.

== See also ==
- List of World War I aces credited with 6 victories
