= Noel Keeble =

RNAS & RAF officer

- Born: 6 April 1892; Peterborough, Northampton
- Died: Unknown
- Military career
- Allegiance: United Kingdom
- Branch: Royal Naval Air Service; Royal Air Force
- Service years: 1915–1934 c.1939–1945
- Rank: Wing Commander
- Units: No. 1 Wing RNAS; No. 202 Squadron RAF; No. 30 Squadron RAF; No. 1 Armoured Car Company RAF
- Conflicts: First World War; Western Front; Second World War
- Awards: Distinguished Service Cross; Distinguished Flying Cross; Mentioned in Despatches; Croix de guerre (France)

Wing Commander (rank) Noel Keeble DSC, DFC (6 April 1892—4 June 1963) was a British flying ace of the First World War, credited with six aerial victories.

== First World War ==
Keeble entered the Royal Naval Air Service as a probationary flight sub-lieutenant, and on 2 August 1915 was confirmed in his rank of flight sub-lieutenant for temporary service. He was assigned to a squadron in No. 1 Wing, based at Saint-Pol-sur-Mer, Dunkirk, and gained his first victory while flying a Nieuport. On 25 January 1916 he forced down a German seaplane 7 mi (11 km) off Nieuwpoort. His second victory did not come until 23 October when, flying a Sopwith Pup, he destroyed another seaplane 10 miles (16 km) off Nieuwpoort. He was subsequently awarded the Distinguished Service Cross, which was gazetted on 11 May 1917. His citation read:

Distinguished Service Cross

Flt.-Lieut. Noel Keeble, R.N.A.S.

For conspicuous gallantry on the 23rd October, 1916, when he attacked four German seaplanes and brought one of them down in a vertical nose-dive into the sea.

On 1 October 1916 he was promoted to flight lieutenant, and on 31 December 1917 appointed a flight commander.

On 1 April 1918, the Royal Naval Air Service was merged with the Army's Royal Flying Corps to form the Royal Air Force, and Keeble became part of No. 202 Squadron RAF, flying the DH.4 two-seater day bomber. With Captain Eric Betts as his observer/gunner he went on to gain four more aerial victories; firstly destroying a Pfalz D.III north of Essen on 5 June, then driving down out of control a Fokker D.VII over Bruges on 10 August. Finally, on 16 September, he destroyed a Pfalz D.III over Lissewege and a Fokker D.VII over Dudzele.

Keeble was awarded the Distinguished Flying Cross, which was gazetted on 20 September 1918. His citation read:

Distinguished Flying Cross

Lieut. (T./Capt.) Noel Keeble, D.S.C. (Sea Patrol).

This officer (with an observer) has obtained 1,000 invaluable photographs of enemy positions miles behind the lines, and has brought home extremely important new information during this period. He has destroyed eight enemy machines, including one biplane during the past month. Captain Keeble is a most capable and gallant Flight Commander.

== Inter-war career ==
Post-war, Keeble was granted a short service commission as a flight lieutenant in the RAF, but this was later cancelled and he was granted a permanent commission from 1 August 1919. He served at No. 6 Flying Training School until being transferred to the School of Technical Training on 1 April 1922, but was soon transferred again, being posted to the RAF College Cadet Flying Wing at Cranwell on 8 August. On 23 February 1923 he was sent to Iraq to serve in No. 30 Squadron, before returning to England to serve at the Electrical and Wireless School at RAF Flowerdown from 20 August 1925. On 7 April 1927 he was posted to the RAF Depot at RAF Uxbridge. He later returned to Iraq to serve in No. 1 Armoured Car Company from 7 October 1930, and then at the Aircraft Depot at RAF Hinaidi from 2 May 1932. A few days later, on 6 May, he received a mention in despatches from Air Vice-Marshal Edgar Ludlow-Hewitt, Air Officer Commanding, Iraq Command, "for distinguished service rendered during operations in Southern Kurdistan, during the period October 1930–May 1931."

Keeble finally left the RAF, being placed on the retired list on 4 August 1934.

== Second World War ==
Keeble returned to RAF service during the Second World War with the rank of flight lieutenant. On 1 March 1942 he was promoted to temporary squadron leader, and this was made war substantive on 6 November 1942. He reverted to the retired list on 31 October 1945, retaining the rank of wing commander.
