= Charles Harrison (RAF officer) =

British World War I flying ace

Charles Philip Harrison
- Born: 27 July 1888; Wimbledon, London, England
- Died: 25 February 1922; Harare, Zimbabwe
- Military career
- Allegiance: United Kingdom
- Branch: British Army; Royal Air Force
- Service years: 1915–1919
- Rank: Lieutenant
- Units: Royal Engineers; No. 98 Squadron RAF
- Awards: Military Cross; Legion d'honneur (France)

Lieutenant Charles Philip Harrison MC (born 27 July 1888) was a British World War I flying ace credited with five aerial victories.

== Military service ==
Harrison was commissioned as second lieutenant in the Corps of Royal Engineers on 19 November 1915. He served in France and German West Africa, and was promoted to lieutenant on 4 October 1916.

He was seconded to the Royal Flying Corps, and on 17 May 1918 was appointed an observer officer with the rank of second lieutenant, though with the honorary rank of lieutenant. He was posted to No. 98 Squadron, flying in the DH.9. Harrison gained his first victory on 21 April 1918 with Lieutenant A. M. Phillips as pilot, by driving down 'out of control' a Fokker Dr.I over Bailleul. His second came on 8 May, with Lieutenant N. C. MacDonald, when he set on fire an Albatros D.V over Menen–Wervicq. Flying with Lieutenant Frederick Wilton, he accounted for two more Fokker Dr.I's on 16 July, and a Pfalz D.III on 18 July, for a total of five.

Harrison was awarded the Military Cross, which was gazetted on 13 September 1918. His citation read:

Temporary Lieutenant Charles Philip Harrison, Royal Engineers, attached Royal Air Force.

For conspicuous gallantry and devotion to duty. This officer was acting as observer when his pilot was severely wounded. He opened fire and shot down the enemy aeroplane, which fell in flames. He then took control of his own machine, which was very badly damaged, his pilot being "hors de combat," and notwithstanding complete inexperience in piloting a machine he managed to bring it safely back to an aerodrome. His skill and courage undoubtedly saved his pilot's life, and prevented the machine from falling into the hands of the enemy.

In late November 1918 he was awarded the Croix de Chevalier of the Legion d'honneur by the French government.

Harrison finally left the RAF, being transferred to the unemployed list on 14 June 1919.
