= Frederick Wilton =

Frederick Charles Wilton
- Born: 29 May 1892; Melbourne, Australia
- Died: 7 July 1958 (aged 66); Durban, South Africa
- Military career
- Allegiance: South Africa; United Kingdom
- Branch: South African Army; British Army; Royal Air Force; South African Air Force
- Service years: 1914–1919; 1939–1945
- Rank: Second Lieutenant
- Unit: No. 98 Squadron RAF
- Conflicts: World War I • South-West Africa Campaign • Western Front; World War II
- Awards: Distinguished Flying Cross
- Other work: Electrical contractor

Second Lieutenant Frederick Charles Wilton DFC (29 May 1892 – 7 July 1958) was a South African World War I flying ace credited with six aerial victories.

== Early life and background ==
Wilton was born to John and Sarah Wilton, in Melbourne, Australia. Later the family moved to England, but eventually settled in Durban, South Africa, where Wilton grew up and eventually became an electrician.

== World War I ==
In 1914 Wilton enlisted in the South African Army to serve in the South-West Africa Campaign. He was posted to an engineering unit, and was disappointed in that he never saw any combat. In 1915 he took a ship to England to enlist in the Royal Flying Corps. Serving as a sergeant, he applied for a commission as a pilot. His first application was rejected, but was successful on his second attempt in mid-1917. The first part of his training was in a classroom, at the No. 2 School of Military Aeronautics in Oxford, learning about aircraft engineering, rigging, armaments, aerial navigation and artillery spotting. He was commissioned from cadet to temporary second lieutenant (on probation) on 5 January 1918, and was then posted to RAF Catterick for flight training. After only two hours and forty minutes of dual instruction he was flying solo. He was then trained to use his machine guns, in bombing, and aerial photography.

On 1 April 1918, the Army's Royal Flying Corps was merged with the Royal Naval Air Service to form the Royal Air Force, and about that time Wilton was posted to No. 98 Squadron RAF to fly the Airco DH.9 two-seater day bomber. In bombing missions over German territory, the British relied on flying in close formation to gain mutual protection from German fighters that would attack from above. Nevertheless, Wilton was reported missing in action on 12 June, but soon returned to his unit. He was forced down again by aircraft from Jasta 43 on 11 July. He gained his first aerial victories on 16 July, with Lieutenant Charles Harrison as his observer/gunner, destroying two Fokker Dr.I fighters over the Forêt de Ris. Two days later, on 18 July, Wilton and Harrison destroyed a Pfalz D.III fighter over Forêt de Fère, but his aircraft was badly shot up in the process. Paired with Captain G. H. Gillis, Wilton shot down another Fokker Dr.I in flames over Barleux on 8 August.

Wilton was awarded the Distinguished Flying Cross on 17 September 1918. His citation read:

Second Lieutenant (Temporary Lieutenant) Frederick Charles Wilton.

"A fine fighting airman, who has destroyed six enemy aeroplanes and driven down another out of control. He has taken part in a number of long-distance bombing raids, and is conspicuous for his determination to reach the objective, as well as for his skill in successfully bombing the same."

After two weeks leave in London in early October, Wilton returned to his squadron for further operations. On a raid on the Hirson railway station on 23 October his observer was wounded. On 30 October, west of Mons, Wilton and Gillis, destroyed two Fokker D.VII fighters, but was again his aircraft was badly shot up. By then Wilton had completed forty missions over enemy territory. He was keen to remain in the RAF post-war, but was sent back to England, and eventually released from military service.

=== List of aerial victories ===
Combat record
No.	Date/Time	Aircraft/ Serial No.	Opponent	Result	Location	Notes
1	16 July 1918 @ 1720–1725	DH.9 (C2221)	Fokker Dr.I	Destroyed in flames	Forêt de Ris	Observer: Lieutenant Charles Harrison
2	16 July 1918 @ 1720–1725	DH.9 (C2221)	Fokker Dr.I	Destroyed	Forêt de Ris	Observer: Lieutenant Charles Harrison
3	18 July 1918 @ 0800	DH.9 (C2221)	Pfalz D.III	Destroyed	Forêt de Fère	Observer: Lieutenant Charles Harrison
4	8 August 1918 @ 1815	DH.9 (C2221)	Fokker Dr.I	Destroyed in flames	Barleux	Observer: Captain G. H. Gillis
5	30 October 1918 @ 1130	DH.9 (D692)	Fokker D.VII	Destroyed in flames	West of Mons	Observer: Captain G. H. Gillis
6	30 October 1918 @ 1130	DH.9 (D692)	Fokker D.VII	Destroyed in flames	West of Mons	Observer: Captain G. H. Gillis

== Post-war career ==
Wilton returned to Durban and resumed his job as an electrician, eventually becoming a successful electrical contractor. He married Maude Reilander, and had a son, John. During World War II Wilton joined the South African Air Force, but was disappointed in not being allowed to fly, but instead served in an administrative position. He died in Durban on 7 July 1958.
