= Arthur Britton =

Arthur Frederick Britton
- Born: 2 October 1888; Balham, London, England
- Died: 19 February 1919 (aged 30); Balham, London, England
- Military career
- Allegiance: United Kingdom
- Branch: British Army; Royal Air Force
- Rank: Lieutenant
- Units: Prince Albert's (Somerset Light Infantry); Machine Gun Corps; No. 57 Squadron RFC
- Conflicts: World War I
- Awards: Military Cross; Croix de Guerre (France)

Lieutenant Arthur Frederick Britton MC (2 October 1888 – 19 February 1919) was a World War I flying ace credited with six aerial victories.

== Biography ==
Britton was born in Balham, London, the son of Frederick and Ellen Britton. He was commissioned as a second lieutenant in the Prince Albert's (Somerset Light Infantry) regiment on 27 November 1915, and on 13 March 1916 he was transferred to the Machine Gun Corps.

He was promoted to lieutenant on 1 June 1917, and was transferred to the Royal Flying Corps. Posted to No. 57 Squadron, flying the Airco DH.4, as an observer/gunner, he gained his first victories on 3 July 1917 with pilot Captain Laurence Minot, shooting down two Albatros D.IIIs over Zonnebeke. On 7 July, with pilot Lieutenant A. D. Pryor, he shot down another D.III north-east of Ypres, before his transfer to the Royal Flying Corps was officially gazetted on 12 July. Finally, on 27 July, with Minot again, he shot down three Albatros D.Vs over Houthulst. On 20 August 1917 he was seriously wounded and had his left leg amputated.

On 1 January 1918 he was awarded the Military Cross, and on 18 April 1918 he received permission to wear the Croix de Guerre awarded to him by the French government.

Britton relinquished his commission on account of ill-health caused by his wounds on 28 September 1918. He died from influenza on 19 February 1919.
