= Johann Frint =

World War I flying ace

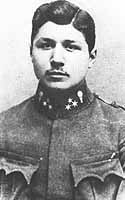
- Born: 6 May 1888; Budapest, Hungary
- Died: 25 February 1918 (aged 29); Vicinity of Bolzano
- Burial place: Auer, Italy
- Military career
- Allegiance: Austria-Hungary
- Branch: Austro-Hungarian Army; Austro-Hungarian Aviation Troops
- Service years: pre-1914–1918
- Rank: Hauptmann
- Units: Infantry Regiment No. 65; Fliegerkompanie 23
- Commands: Fliegerkompanie 27
- Awards: Order of the Iron Crown; Military Merit Medal

Johann Frint (6 May 1888 – 25 February 1918) was an Austro-Hungarian flying ace during World War I and professional soldier credited with six aerial victories while flying as an aerial observer. Crippled as an infantry officer in November 1914, Frint volunteered for the Austro-Hungarian Aviation Troops. He scored his victories on the Italian Front from the rear seat of two-seater reconnaissance aircraft with a variety of pilots, including a triple victory while being flown by his commanding officer, Heinrich Kostrba. Rewarded with the Order of the Iron Crown and Military Merit Medal, Frint became a mediocre pilot. He was entrusted with successive commands of a number of squadrons before dying in an airplane crash in 1918.

== Life before World War I ==
Johann Frint was born on 6 May 1888 in Budapest, Hungary. His boyhood ambition was to be a soldier. However, that was not his only interest. He was a skilled equestrian and swimmer. He was also a bicyclist, and unusually for the era, skilled at driving an automobile.

As a professional military man, he already held the rank of Oberleutnant (First lieutenant) and the position of company commander in Austro-Hungarian Infantry Regiment No. 65 when World War I began. He led his troops into heavy combat on the Russian Front until he was severely wounded in November 1914. Unable to return to infantry duty because of lingering disabilities, he transferred to the Austro-Hungarian Aviation Troops.

== Aerial observer duty ==
Once trained as an aerial observer at Wiener-Neustadt, he was posted to Fliegerkompanie 23 (Flik 23) to fly in the rear seat of either Lloyd or Hansa-Brandenburg two-seater reconnaissance aircraft. Flik 23 was stationed in northern Italy.

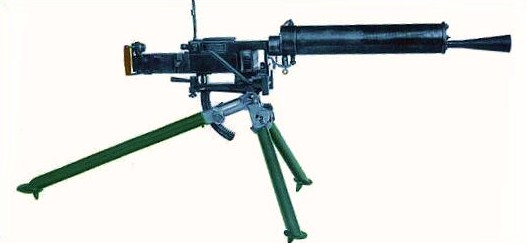
Frint's Fiat–Revelli Modello 1914 machine gun was on a flexible mount instead of a tripod.

At 07:50 hours on 29 April 1916, Frint scored his first aerial victory from the observer's seat of a Lloyd C.III. His accurate fire from his Schwarzlose M 7/12 machine gun forced an Italian Farman into landing west of Monte Tomba. His second victory came at 09:30 hours on 7 June 1916, by firing a Fiat–Revelli Modello 1914 machine gun on a flexible mount at a Farman from the back seat of a Hansa-Brandenburg C.I; he forced the Italian plane into a topsy-turvy crash-landing. His pilot was his commanding officer, Hauptmann (Captain) Heinrich Kostrba.

His commander was also his pilot for a triple victory on 29 June 1916. Beginning at 07:15 hours, their combat extended more than an hour. First, they clashed with an unidentified large Italian plane and crashed it; a radio intercept would verify that two members of the Italian air crew were killed, two wounded. Frint and Kostrba then successively forced two enemy Farmans to land. By 08:20, Frint and Kostrba were aces.

Frint would have one more victory, when he drove down one of four Nieuport fighters at 08:30 hours 8 August 1916 while on a photo intelligence mission. He included a photo of the downed Nieuport in his photo mission as proof of his success.

Frint's valor had not gone unnoticed. He was awarded both the Silver Military Merit Medal and the Order of the Iron Crown, Third Class with War Decorations.

== Service as a pilot ==
Frint then applied for pilot's training in September 1916. He was accepted, but struggled to gain his pilot's badge. Upon graduation, his superiors concluded his disabilities kept him from becoming an expert pilot, but were not eager to lose the services of an enthusiastic seasoned professional soldier. They appointed him to command of several different training units in succession. Then, in September 1917, he was appointed to command of Fliegerkompanie 27 on a quiet sector of the Russian Front. In February 1918, Frint and his squadron were transferred to another quiet assignment, in the Tyrol. It was there he met his end. On 25 February 1918, he was killed during a test flight of an Albatros D.III fighter.

Heinrich Kostrba summed up Johann Frint:

"A quiet, resolute, and clear-sighted man, inspired by the best sense of duty. An outstandingly capable officer, possessing unsurpassed bravery."

== Sources ==
- Franks, Norman; Guest, Russell; Alegi, Gregory (1997). Above the War Fronts: The British Two-seater Bomber Pilot and Observer Aces, the British Two-seater Fighter Observer Aces, and the Belgian, Italian, Austro-Hungarian and Russian Fighter Aces, 1914–1918. Grub Street. ISBN 978-1898697565.
- O'Connor, Martin (1994). Air Aces of the Austro-Hungarian Empire 1914 - 1918. Flying Machines Press. ISBN 978-0-9637110-1-4.
