= Erich Schütze =

- Born: Unknown
- Died: Unknown
- Military career
- Allegiance: German Empire
- Branch: Luftstreitkräfte
- Rank: Offizierstellvertreter (Deputy Officer)
- Units: Flieger-Abteilung (Flier Detachment) 201, Reihenbildzug (Special Photographic Unit) 9, Jagdstaffel 25
- Awards: Military Merit Cross

Offizierstellvertreter (Deputy Officer) Erich Schütze was a World War I flying ace credited with six aerial victories.

== World War I service ==
Erich Schütze first came to notice in his first combat assignment with Flieger-Abteilung (Flier Detachment) 201, when he and his observer were credited with an aerial victory over a SPAD on 27 May 1917 over Craonne, France. He then left the two-seater reconnaissance unit for a posting to Reihenbildzug (Special Photographic Unit) 9, to fly long photo recon missions. While serving with this unit in Romania, he was credited with destroying an observation balloon northwest of Păunești on 7 September 1917. Next to fall was a Sopwith northwest of Brăila, on 28 October. A second balloon fell to Schütze on 20 November 1917. As recognition of his exploits, he received the Golden Military Merit Cross on 20 December 1917. The award was the highest recognition of courage available to an enlisted soldier of the German Empire.

Schütze made the transition from Armee-Flug-Park (Army Flight Park) II to single-seat fighters to join a fighter squadron in Macedonia. When posted to Jagdstaffel 25 on 27 April 1918, he was ranked as a vizefeldwebel. On 20 May 1918, he shot down a Dorand AR north of Monastir, Macedonia for his fifth victory. On 23 August 1918, he closed out his victory list by downing a SPAD at Sivestrena. Erich Schütze had confirmed victories over two observation balloons and four enemy fighters scored over three fronts.

At some point, Schütze was appointed as Offizierstellvertreter (deputy officer), but it is unknown if he received a commission.
