= Karl Deilmann =

German flying ace (1894–1985)

- Born: 22 April 1894; Dortmund, Germany
- Died: 12 January 1985 (aged 90); Bad Bentheim
- Military career
- Allegiance: Germany
- Branch: Aviation
- Rank: Leutnant
- Units: Flieger-Abteilung (Artillerie) 52; Flieger-Abteilung (Artillerie) 58; Flieger-Abteilung (Artillerie) 34; Flieger-Abteilung (Artillerie) 244; Staffel 30 of Bombengeschwader der Oberste Heeresleitung 5 Jagdstaffel 6
- Awards: Iron Cross First and Second Class

Leutnant Karl Deilmann was a German World War I flying ace credited with six aerial victories.

== Biography ==
=== Early life ===
Deilmann was born in Dortmund on 22 April 1894.

=== Military service ===
See also Aerial victory standards of World War I

As World War I began, Deilmann joined the Die Fliegertruppen des deutschen Kaiserreiches (Imperial German Flying Corps) in September 1914. He was posted to Feldflieger Abteilung (Field Flier Detachment) 34 in October. He was appointed as a Gefreiter in November, and promoted to Unteroffizier in January 1915.

During 1915, Deilmann served successively in Feldflieger Abteilung 52 and Flieger-Abteilung (Artillerie) 58. He was awarded the Iron Cross Second Class on 17 July 1915. On 14 February 1916, he was assigned to Staffel 30 of Bombengeschwader 5, which operated under direct command of the German Supreme General Staff. He won a First Class Iron Cross, awarded on 10 July 1916. Although details are lacking, Deilmann was credited with two aerial victories during 1916. On 15 September 1916, he was promoted to the officer ranks as a Leutnant, and transferred to fly fighter aircraft for Royal Prussian Jagdstaffel 6. He scored his third aerial victory on 25 March 1917, and ran his total to six credited and one unconfirmed aerial victories by 17 August 1917. He transferred to Flieger-Abteilung (Artillerie) 244 for September and October 1917, before being withdrawn from combat for instructor duties.

=== Death ===
Karl Deilmann died on 12 January 1985 in the spa town of Bad Bentheim.
