= Rudolf Weber (aviator) =

Austro-Hungarian World War I flying ace

- Born: 1890; Schäßburg, Austria-Hungary (today Sighișoara, Romania)
- Died: October 1918 (aged 27–28); Styria, Austria
- Military career
- Allegiance: Austro-Hungarian Empire
- Branch: Infantry; aviation
- Service years: 1911 - 1918
- Rank: Oberleutnant (first lieutenant)
- Units: Infantry Regiment No. 31, Fliegerkompanie 25, Fliegerkompanie 2
- Commands: Fliegerkompanie 102G
- Awards: Order of the Iron Crown, Military Merit Cross, Military Merit Medal, German Iron Cross

Oberleutnant Rudolf Weber (1890-1918) was an Austro-Hungarian World War I flying ace credited with six aerial victories. Weber was an experienced infantry officer when World War I began in 1914, and he went into action on the Russian Front. He transferred to aerial service in late 1915. During his 1916 service as an observer, he scored his first victory and suffered a disfiguring wound to his face. Once healed, he trained as a pilot and returned to action, but on the Italian Front. Between 11 August and 26 October 1917, he scored five more victories. In January 1918, he was posted to command Flik 102G, a night bombing squadron. In October 1918, as the Austro-Hungarian Empire dissolved in defeat, Weber led an exodus home from his unit. Along the way, a trigger-happy militiaman shot Weber to death.

== Biography ==
=== Early life and infantry service ===
Of Saxon heritage, Rudolf Weber was born in 1890 in Segesvar, Transylvania, in modern day Romania. Weber joined the Austro-Hungarian Army in 1911. When the First World War began in 1914, Weber was serving as an officer in the 31st Austro-Hungarian Regiment. He would go into action with the regiment on the Russian Front, winning a Bronze Military Merit Medal. He also received an early promotion to oberleutnant (first lieutenant).

=== Aviation service ===
In late 1915, he transferred to aviation service as an aerial observer with Flik 25. He began aerial observer training in late January 1916. He began flying combat in mid-April 1916, during the Brusilov Offensive. At 1930 hours on 12 June 1916, from the rear seat of a Hansa-Brandenburg C.I he scored his first aerial victory, but was wounded in the face by antiaircraft shrapnel. The wound was so disfiguring he would never again allow a photograph of himself. He was awarded the Military Merit Medal, Third Class with War Decoration, as well as the German Iron Cross, Second Class. However, recovering from his jaw wound would entail a lengthy convalescence, during which he decided on pilot training.

Retrained as a pilot, Weber was appointed deputy commander of Flik 2. Flying both single-seat fighter and two-seater reconnaissance aircraft, he fought in the Battles of the Isonzo in northern Italy. Between 11 August and 26 October 1917, he was credited with five more victories. This earned him the Order of the Iron Crown, Third Class with War Decoration and Swords.

=== Weber in command ===
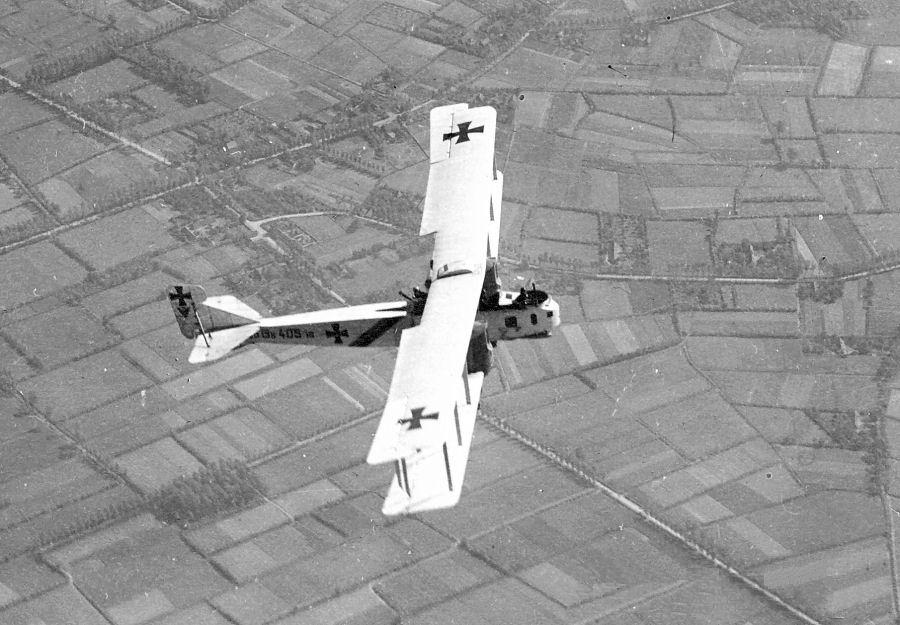
A Gotha G IV bomber

In January 1918, Weber was transferred to command another unit on the Italian Front, Flik 102G at Aviano. He led this pioneering night bomber unit equipped with Hansa-Brandenburg and Gotha G.IV aircraft almost until war's end. In late October 1918, he then tried to evacuate the squadron's aircraft from Italy, leading a flight from Aviano to Laibach, (present day Ljubljana, Slovenia). There the aircraft were seized by the war's victors. Weber then led some of his men in a trek for home by commandeering an automobile. At a checkpoint in northern Austria, Weber was accidentally shot and wounded by a militiaman. He died of his wound and was buried in Vienna's Central Cemetery.
