= Laurence Minot (RFC officer) =

British World War I flying ace

Laurence Minôt
- Born: 21 June 1896; Wandsworth, Surrey, England
- Died: 28 June 1917 (aged 21) near Harelbeke, Belgium
- Burial place: Harelbeke New British Cemetery, Belgium; 50°51′34″N 3°19′28″E
- Military career
- Allegiance: United Kingdom
- Branch: British Army
- Service years: 1915–1917
- Rank: Captain
- Units: No. 16 Squadron RFC; No. 57 Squadron RFC
- Conflicts: World War I • Western Front
- Awards: Military Cross

Captain Laurence Minôt MC (21 July 1896 – 28 July 1917) was a British World War I flying ace credited with six aerial victories, who was killed in action a week after his 21st birthday.

== Biography ==
=== Early life ===
Laurence Minôt was born in Wandsworth, Surrey, the only son of John Edward and Ada Minôt of Upper Norwood. He was educated at Dulwich College from 1909, where he was made a school prefect and head of the house in May 1914, also representing his school in the rugby union First XV.

=== Aerial service ===
Minôt began learning to fly at the Hall Flying School at Hendon Aerodrome in January 1915, during the school holidays. He left Dulwich in April, and eventually gained his Royal Aero Club Aviator's Certificate on 8 July.

Minôt was commissioned as a second lieutenant (on probation) in the Royal Flying Corps (RFC) on 28 October 1915, and was confirmed in his rank on 15 February 1916. He was soon sent to France, posted to No. 16 Squadron RFC, flying a variety of aircraft on patrols and reconnaissance missions. He was appointed a flight commander with the temporary rank of captain on 28 July 1916.

He was transferred to No. 57 Squadron RFC in 1917 to fly the Airco DH.4 two-seater day bomber. Paired with observer/gunner Lieutenant Arthur Britton, Minôt gained his first aerial victories on 3 July 1917, accounting for two Albatros D.Vs over Zonnebeke, one driven down out of control and the other shot down flames, killing Albert Dossenbach. On 7 July, with AM1 Goffe as his observer, he drove down another D.V north-east of Ypres. Britton had returned as his observer on 27 July when they drove down three D.Vs over Houthulst. As a result of this action, and that of 7 July, Minôt would be awarded the Military Cross, while Britton received the Croix de guerre.

The next day, 28 July, five aircraft from No. 57 Squadron took off from Boisdinghem to attack the German airfields at Heule and Ingelmunster. As result of injuries sustained the previous day Britton was unable to fly, so Minôt was paired with Second Lieutenant Sidney John Leete. However, they were intercepted by the Albatros D.Vs of Jasta 6, a unit of von Richthofen's "Flying Circus", and in the ensuing dogfight Minôt's aircraft was last seen chasing an enemy aircraft towards the ground. Initially listed as missing, news eventually reached the British via the Red Cross that Minôt and Leete had been shot down and killed. They may have fallen victim to Leutnant Hans Ritter von Adam, who was himself subsequently killed in action on 15 November 1917.

Minôt and Leete are buried alongside each other in the Harlebeke New British Cemetery in West Flanders, Belgium.

Minôt's Military Cross was posthumously gazetted on 19 April 1918. His citation read:

Second Lieutenant (Temporary Captain) Laurence Minôt, RFC, Special Reserve.

"For conspicuous gallantry and devotion to duty. When leading a formation of five bombing machines, he attacked a hostile formation of twenty machines, and in the ensuing fight himself drove down two enemy machines completely out of control, whilst his observer destroyed another. Another four of the enemy formation were driven down completely out of control, and, as a result of his gallant leadership and determined action, his formation succeeded in getting back with the loss of but one machine. On a previous occasion he, in company with two other machines, attacked four of enemy who were reinforced later by thirteen scouts, and, after heavy fighting, drove down one enemy machine out of control, his formation returning safely."

== The Laurence Minôt Memorial Trophy ==
In May 1926 the Air Ministry announced the instigation of the Laurence Minôt Memorial Trophy, which would be awarded annually to the crew of the aircraft which obtained the highest degree of accuracy in bombing. The trophy, in the shape of a large silver eagle, was originally donated anonymously, but was in fact commissioned by Minôt's father in memory of his only son.

The trophy was originally awarded in a competition held between bomber squadrons of the Air Defence of Great Britain, which came in the Wessex Bombing Area – the precursor of Bomber Command. Wing Commander Charles Portal, commander of No. 7 Squadron, won the trophy in its initial year of 1927, and then again in 1928. The 1928 contest took place at the North Coates Fitties bombing range where Portal, in a Vickers Virginia flying at 10,000 feet (3 km), dropped his bombs to within 30–40 yards (27–37 m) of the target. From 1930 until 1936, the competition was confined to night bombing squadrons in home commands, and was then in abeyance until revived in 1949, when it was awarded to the Bomber Command squadron showing the best all-round excellence in training throughout the year. The annual awards gradually petered out in the late 1950s. In 2011 the trophy was found to be at the official residence of the Chief of the Air Staff, and at their request was transferred to the Officer's Mess of No. 57 Squadron at RAF Wyton. In August 2013 No. 57 Squadron also acquired Captain Minôt's Military Cross, presented to them by one of his last remaining relatives.
