= Dudzele =

Sub-municipality of the city of Bruges, Belgium

- Sub-municipality of Bruges
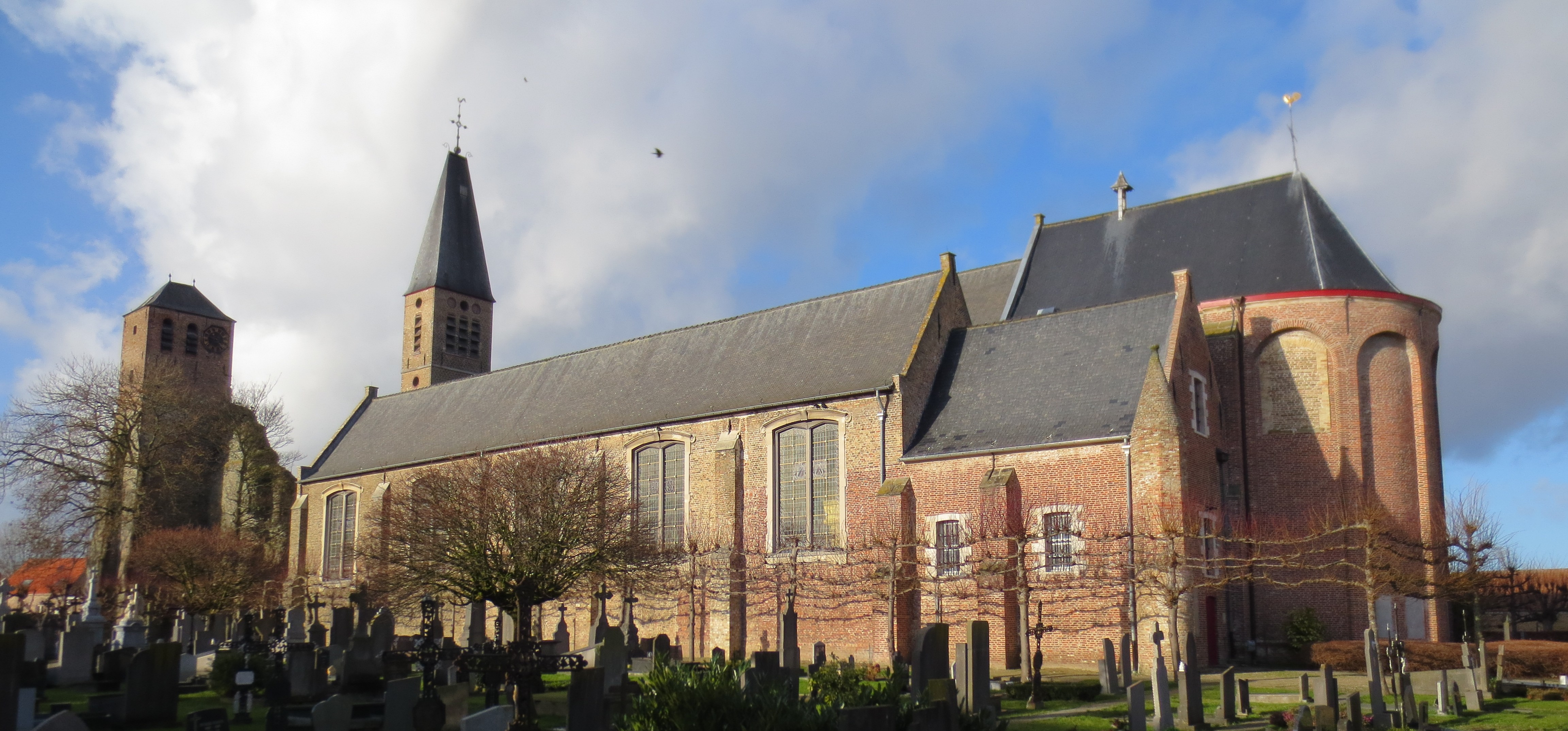
- Church of Saint Peter in Chains

- Coat of arms
- Interactive map of Dudzele
- Location within Belgium Location within West Flanders
- Coordinates: 51°16′31″N 3°13′40″E
- Country: Belgium
- Community: Flemish Community
- Region: Flemish Region
- Province: West Flanders
- Arrondissement: Bruges
- Municipality: Bruges

Area
  - Total: 21.92 km^{2} (8.46 sq mi)

Population (2014-12-31)
  - Total: 2,565
  - Density: 117.0/km^{2} (303.1/sq mi)
- Postal codes: 8380
- Area codes: 050

Dudzele (Dutch pronunciation: [ˈdʏtseːlə]) is a sub-municipality of the city of Bruges located in the province of West Flanders, Flemish Region, Belgium. It was a separate municipality until 1971. On 1 January 1971, it was merged into Bruges.

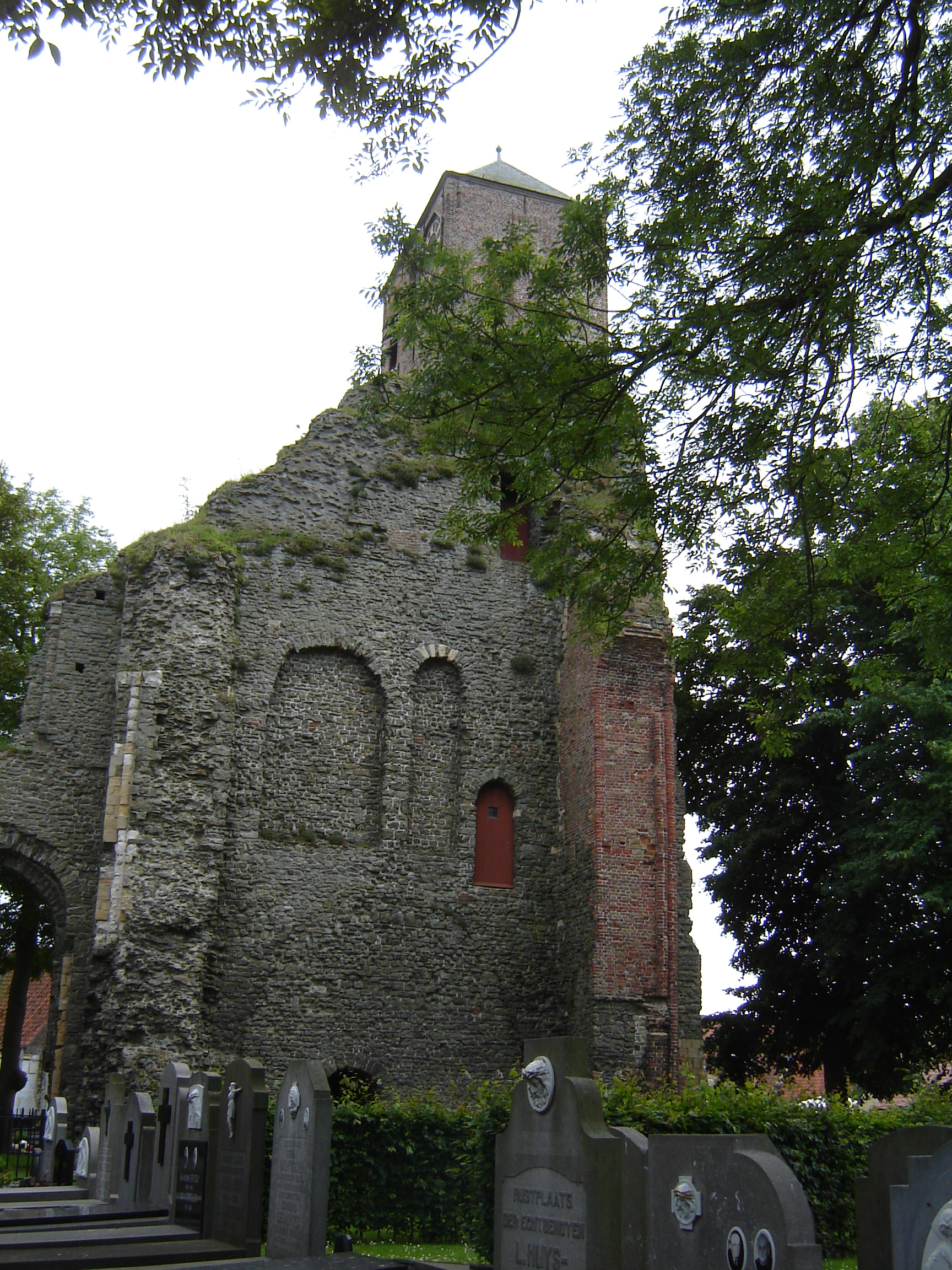
Sint-Pietersbandenkerk in Dudzele

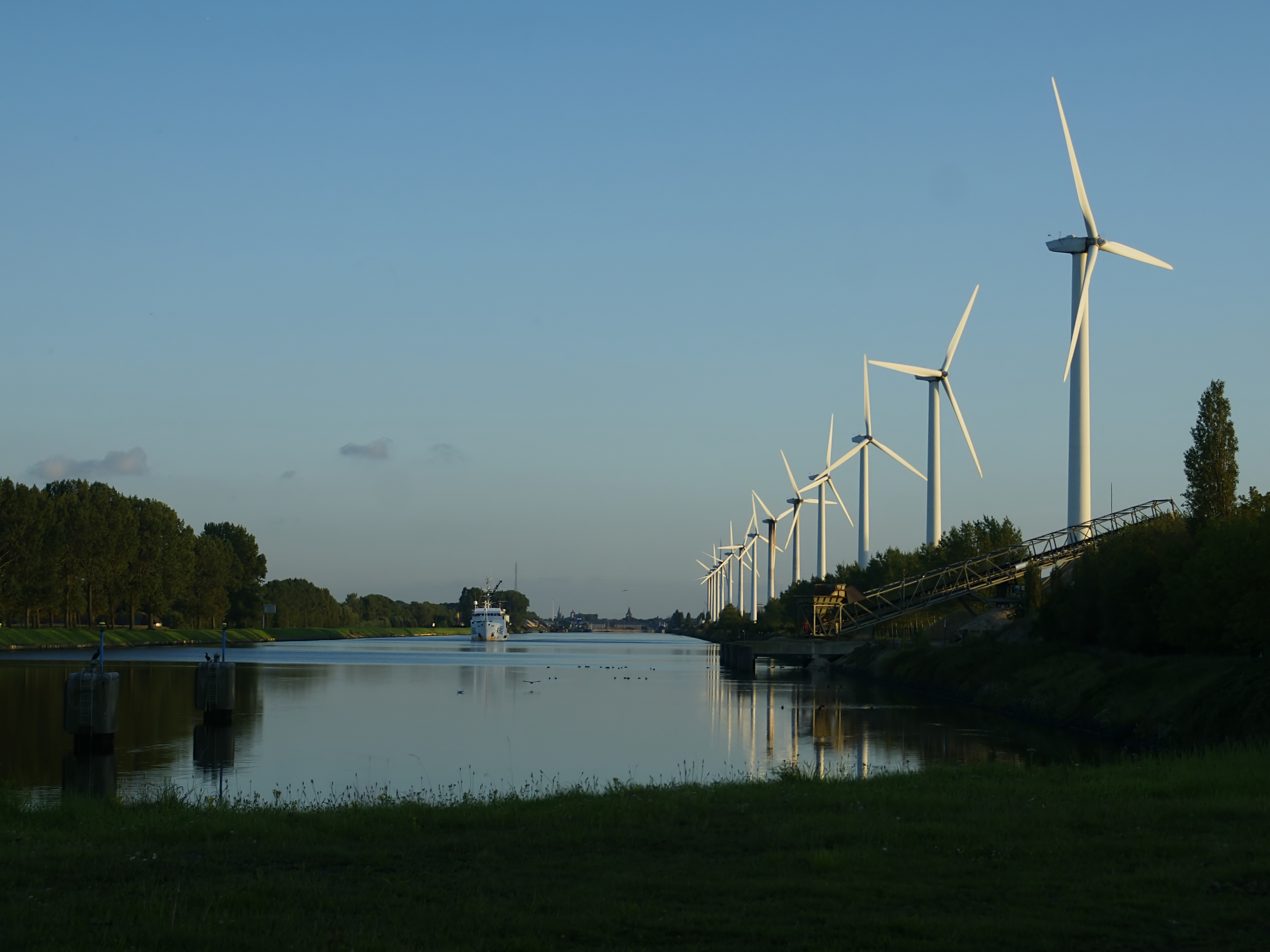
The RV Belgica (A962) leaving the port of Bruges
