= No. 54 Squadron RAF =

Flying squadron of the Royal Air Force

- Squadron badge
- Active: 1916–1918 (RFC); 1918–1919; 1930–1945; 1946–2005; 2005 – present
- Country: United Kingdom
- Branch: Royal Air Force
- Type: Operational conversion unit
- Role: Intelligence, Surveillance, Target Acquisition and Reconnaissance (ISTAR) training
- Part of: ISTAR Force
- Station: RAF Waddington
- Mottos: Audax omnia perpeti (Latin for 'Boldness endures anything')
- Aircraft: Beechcraft Shadow R1; Boeing RC-135W Rivet Joint; Boeing Poseidon MRA1; General Atomics Protector RG1

Insignia
- Roundel
- Tail codes: DL (Apr 1939–Sep 1939, Apr 1944–Oct 1945); KL (Sep 1939–Jun 1942); HF (Nov 1945–Apr 1948) (Codes taken over from No. 183 Sqn); GA–GZ (Jaguars)

Number 54 Squadron (sometimes written as No. LIV Squadron) is a squadron of the Royal Air Force based at RAF Waddington, Lincolnshire. On 1 September 2005, it took on the role of Intelligence, Surveillance and Reconnaissance (ISR) Operational Conversion Unit, and is now the Advanced Air ISTAR Academy, responsible for training all RAF crews assigned to the MQ-9A Reaper, Protector RG1 (MQ-9B), Shadow R1/R2, RC-135W Rivet Joint and Poseidon MRA1. It also controls the RAF ISR Warfare School (ISRWS) who run the Qualified Weapons Instructor Intelligence, Surveillance and Reconnaissance (QWI ISR) and QWI Reaper Courses.

The squadron was previously a SEPECAT Jaguar strike fighter unit, based at RAF Coltishall, Norfolk, from April 1974 until it was disbanded on 11 March 2005.

== History ==
=== World War I ===
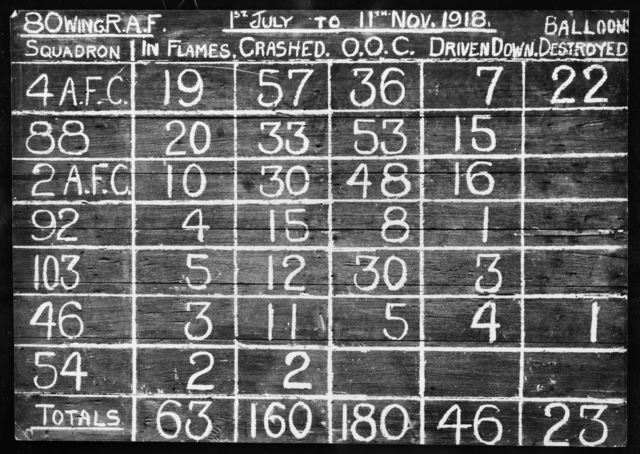
Serny, France, November 1918. A score board recording the claims for enemy aircraft destroyed by No. 80 Wing RAF from July–November 1918, including 54 Squadron

No. 54 Squadron was formed at Castle Bromwich on 5 May 1916. Like many others formed at the same time, was tasked with Home Defence duties flying BE2Cs and Avro 504s. Four months later, however, it re-equipped with Sopwith Pups, being the first Royal Flying Corps Squadron to operate the Pup. It moved to France as a day fighter squadron in December 1916. It was initially used as for bomber escort, claiming its first kill, an Albatros D.III, in April 1917, but specialised in attacking enemy observation balloons during the Battle of Arras.

The Pup soon became outclassed in air combat, however, and No. 54 concentrated on ground attack missions until it could re-equip with Sopwith Camels in December 1917, allowing to return to fighter duties, providing protection for Army co-operation squadrons. The German spring offensive saw a return to low level attack missions, carrying out both ground attack and fighter missions until the end of the War. In February 1919, the Squadron returned to RAF Yatesbury, reduced to cadre status and was disbanded on 25 October 1919.

=== Between the wars ===
The Squadron was reformed at RAF Hornchurch on 15 January 1930 as a fighter squadron equipped initially with dual-control Siskin Trainers until Bristol Bulldog fighters were received in April that year. The squadron had a brief stay at RAF Upavon in 1931, prior to returning to RAF Hornchurch. The Bulldogs were replaced by Gloster Gauntlets, in September 1936 and Gladiators in April 1937, before the Squadron's first monoplane, the Supermarine Spitfire, arrived in March 1939.

=== World War II ===
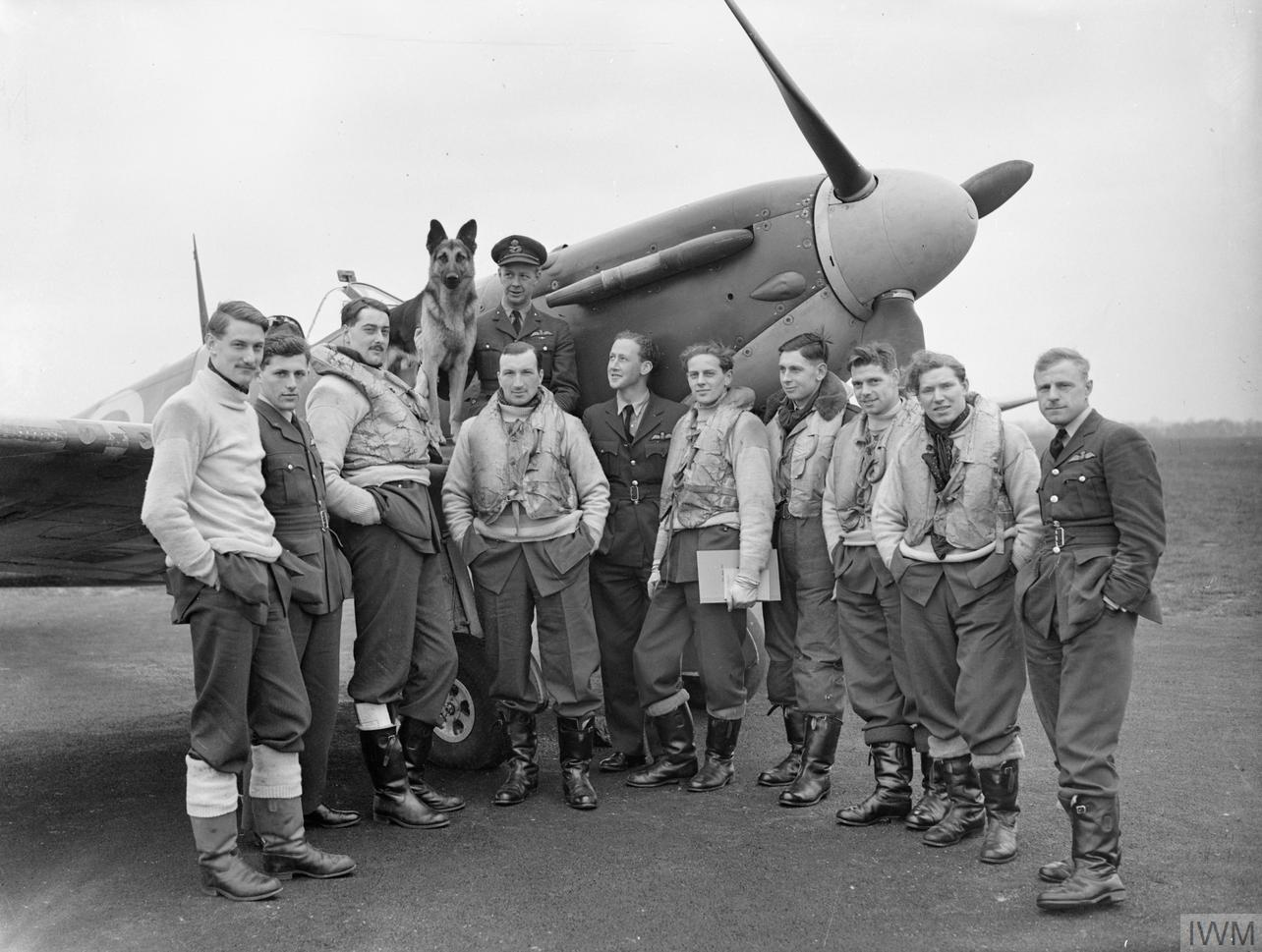
Pilots of 54 Squadron, May 1941 gathered round a Supermarine Spitfire Mark IIA Rochford, Essex. On the wing sits their commanding officer, Squadron Leader, R F Boyd, with the squadron mascot "Crash". Boyd had at this time destroyed 14 enemy aircraft. At the end of July 1941, he was promoted wing leader of the Kenley Wing, and by the end of his tour in the summer of 1942 had increased his score to at least 22.5.

The early days of World War II were spent patrolling the Kent coast until, in May 1940, the unit provided air cover for the evacuation of Dunkirk, claiming 31 aircraft shot down for the loss of 4 pilots and seven Spitfires.

From July, the Squadron was heavily engaged in the Battle of Britain, often using RAF Manston as a forward operating base. The fighting was intense, and losses were heavy, with the Squadron being withdrawn to RAF Catterick on 2 September 1940. One notable pilot during the first year of the year was "Al" Deere, who claimed 11 German aircraft shot down, while himself being shot down 7 times.

No. 54 Squadron returned to Hornchurch in February 1941, flying fighter sweeps and bomber escort missions over Northern France until November 1941, when it moved north to RAF Castletown, Caithness, undertaking coastal patrols over the Pentland Firth. In June 1942, the squadron was moved to RAF Wellingore, to prepare for moving to Australia.

In mid-1942, the squadron joined No. 1 Wing (Spitfire Wing) of the Royal Australian Air Force, a Spitfire unit responsible for air defence duties against Japanese aircraft in the Darwin area. No. 54 Squadron arrived at RAAF Station Darwin on 17 January. Initially, the wing as a whole suffered from the inexperience of its pilots and mechanical problems caused during the shipment of Spitfires. Although contact with the Japanese was generally brief, 54 Squadron pilots scored a number of kills. Following the end of the war, the squadron disbanded in Melbourne on 31 October 1945.

=== Post World War II ===
On 15 November 1945 No. 183 Squadron RAF, a Hawker Tempest ground-attack unit based at RAF Chilbolton near Oxford, was renumbered to No. 54 Squadron and spent a year training pilots destined for overseas service before receiving Vampires and moving to RAF Odiham on 22 November 1947.

Vampire fighters

In 1948, six Vampires from the Squadron made history when they completed the first crossing of the Atlantic by jet aircraft. Flying in 3 legs with over 8 hours in the air and accompanied by ground crew in Avro Yorks Following a three-year stint with Meteors, which arrived in April 1952, Hunters arrived in March 1955, and the Squadron took up fighter duties with Hunter Mk 4s in September 1955. Reequipped with Mk 6s as part of No 38 Group, frequently deploying to trouble spots around the world as part of the Group's Offensive Strike Wing. The Squadron was the first jet RAF formation team to trail smoke with a team of six Vampires.

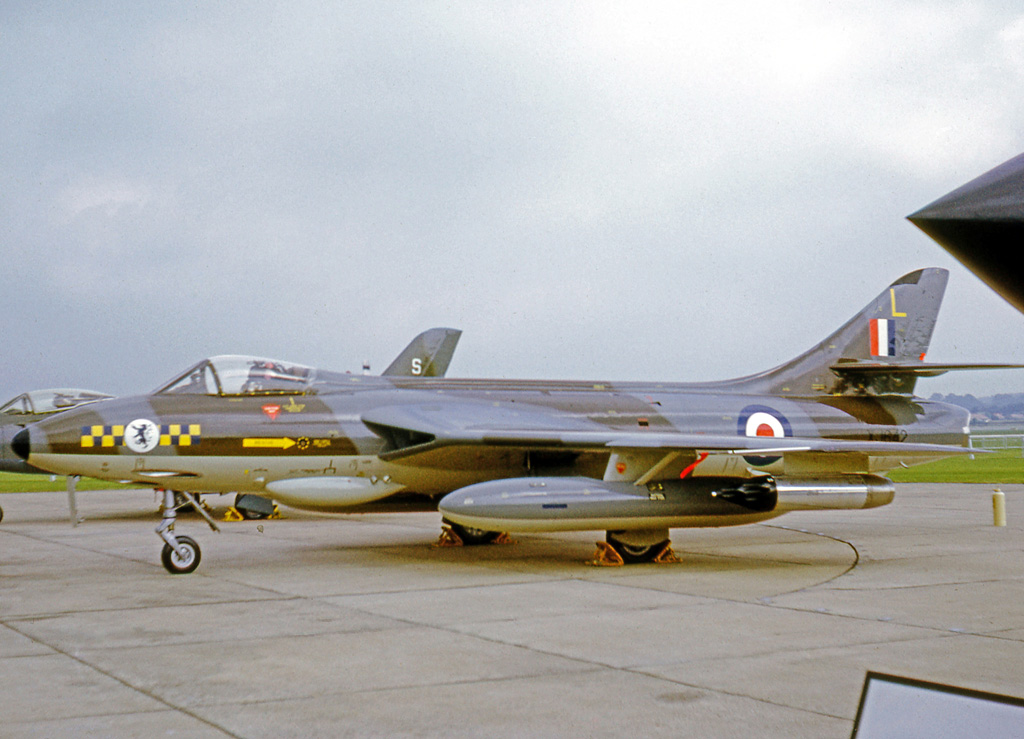
Hawker Hunter FGA.9 ground attack aircraft of 54 Squadron in 1968 wearing the unit's blue rampant lion marking on its nose

In 1955, No 54 Squadron flew a formation of four Hawker Hunter F1 aircraft. The following year the Squadron team adopted the name The Black Knights – the pilots wore black flying suits. They re-equipped to Mk9s gradually as the squadron relocated from RAF Odiham to RAF Stradishall in July 1959 with Hunter Mk9s and to RAF West Raynham, Norfolk, in 1963.

The squadron was briefly disbanded on 1 September 1969, however was reformed the same day after being re-equipped with McDonnell-Douglas Phantoms at RAF Coningsby in 1969.

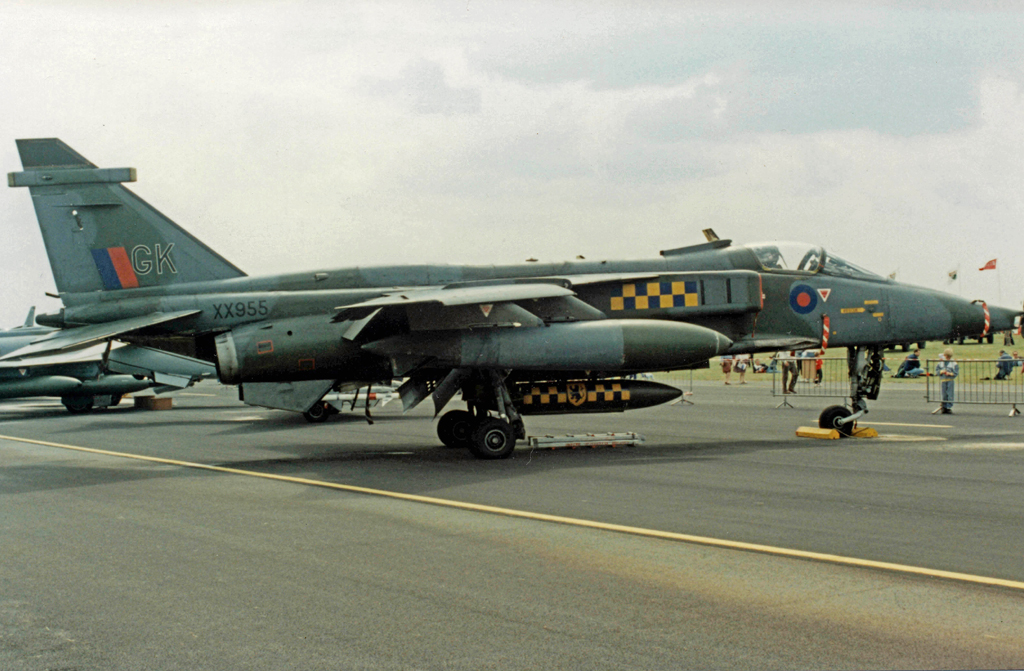
SEPECAT Jaguar GR.1A of No. 54 Squadron in 1990 wearing the unit's 'Rampant Lion' symbol on its below fuselage equipment

By 1974 when twelve SEPECAT Jaguar aircraft were delivered the squadron had re-located to RAF Coltishall. From 1975 until at least 1994 (the last year for which data is available) the squadron's wartime role was as an operational squadron in the front line assigned to SACEUR with twelve Jaguar aircraft, eight WE.177 tactical nuclear bombs, and a variety of conventional weapons. In a high-intensity European war the unit's role was to support land forces on the Continent resisting an assault by the Red Army on Western Europe, first with conventional weapons and secondly with tactical nuclear weapons, should a conflict escalate to that stage, by striking beyond the forward edge of the battlefield into enemy-held areas. The apparent mismatch between aircraft numbers and nuclear bombs was a consequence of RAF staff planners concluding that with some aircraft held back from the conventional phase as a reserve, there would be one-third attrition of aircraft, leaving the remaining survivors numerically strong enough to deliver the squadron's entire stockpile of eight nuclear bombs.

=== Post Cold War ===
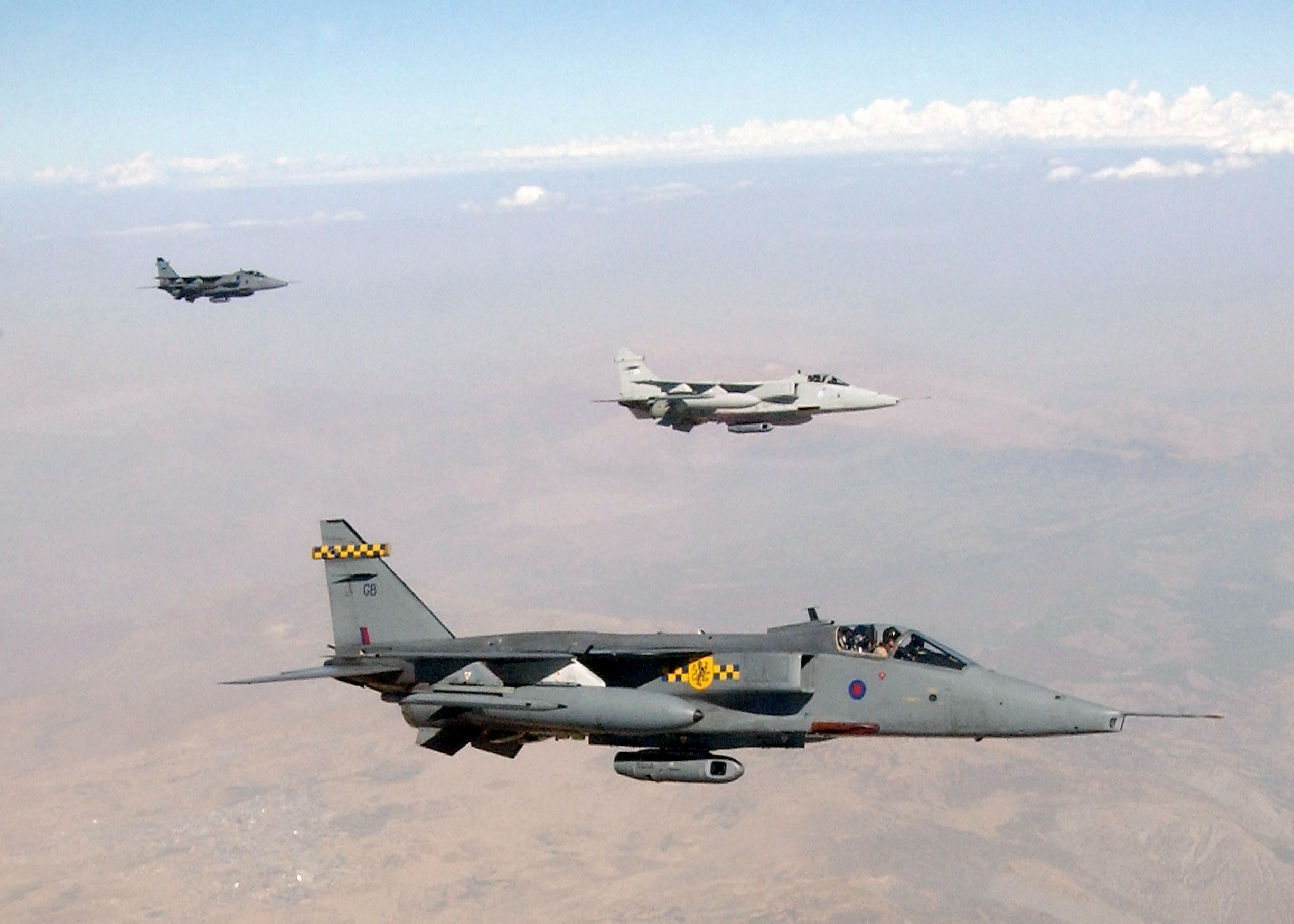
Three 54 Sqn Jaguar GR1As over northern Iraq in 2002.

The squadron moved to RAF Coltishall in 1974 and, following the retirement of the WE.177 nuclear weapon in the late 1990s, took on a more expeditionary footing with a number of operational deployments including flights over Northern Iraq from Incirlik Air Base in Turkey and flights over the Balkans from Gioia del Colle Air Base in Italy. With the decision taken to run the Jaguar fleet down in anticipation of the arrival of its replacement, the Typhoon, No 54 Squadron was disbanded at RAF Coltishall on 11 March 2005.

=== 2005 - 2021: ISR Operational Conversion Unit (OCU) ===
Reformed as No. 54 (Reserve) Squadron at RAF Waddington on 1 September 2005 it re-roled as the Intelligence, Surveillance and Reconnaissance (ISR) OCU, responsible for training all mission crews for the E-3D Sentry AEW1, the Nimrod R1, Sentinel R.1, Shadow R1 and later the MQ-9A Reaper.

From 2010, 54(R) Squadron became the home of the ISR Warfare School who are responsible for the delivery of the Qualified Weapons Instructor Course for ISR (QWI ISR).

Since 2013, 54 Sqn has also trained crews for the newly acquired RC-135 Rivet Joint aircraft.

The squadron was formally titled No. 54 (Reserve) Squadron up until 2018, when the (Reserve) suffix was removed from all training squadrons.

On 31 October 2019, crew from No. 54 Squadron ferried the first RAF Boeing Poseidon MRA.1 ZP801 from the Boeing Renton Factory, Seattle, to NAS Jacksonville, Florida. Since October 2020, the squadron operates a detachment at RAF Lossiemouth, Moray, in order to act as the OCU for the Poseidon MRA.1.

=== Since 2021: Advanced Air ISTAR Academy ===
In June 2021 Defence Secretary Ben Wallace established a new Advanced Air ISTAR Academy run by 54 Squadron as 'a national and international centre of excellence for remotely piloted air systems and for intelligence, surveillance and reconnaissance'. In this capacity 54 Squadron continues to deliver OCU training for the RAF ISTAR Force as a Central Flying School (CFS) Approved Training Organisation (ATO).

In May 2023, 54 Squadron began training crew for the Protector RG1 in cooperation with the manufacturer, General Atomics Aeronautical Systems, at Grand Forks AFB in North Dakota.

== Aircraft operated ==
Aircraft operated include:

- Royal Aircraft Factory B.E.2c (May 1916 – December 1916)
- Royal Aircraft Factory B.E.12 (June 1916 – June 1916)
- Avro 504 (July 1916 – ?)
- Bristol Scout (October 1916 – December 1916)
- Sopwith Pup (October 1916 – December 1917)
- Sopwith Camel (December 1917 – February 1919)
- Armstrong Whitworth Siskin Mk.IIIa/Mk.IIIdc (January 1930 – December 1930)
- Bristol Bulldog Mk.IIa (April 1930 – September 1936)
- Gloster Gauntlet Mk.II (August 1936 – May 1937)
- Gloster Gladiator Mk.I (April 1937 – February 1941)
- Supermarine Spitfire Mk.I (March 1939 – February 1941)
- Supermarine Spitfire Mk.IIa (February 1941 – May 1941; August 1941)
- Supermarine Spitfire Mk.Va (May 1941 – November 1941)
- Supermarine Spitfire Mk.IIb (November 1941 – March 1942)
- Supermarine Spitfire Mk.Vb (March 1942 – June 1942)
- Supermarine Spitfire Mk.Vc (November 1942 – May 1944)
- Supermarine Spitfire Mk.VIII (April 1944 – September 1945)
- Hawker Tempest Mk.II (November 1945 – October 1946)
- de Havilland Vampire Mk.I (October 1946 – August 1948)
- de Havilland Vampire F.3 (April 1948 – November 1949)
- de Havilland Vampire FB.5 (October 1949 – April 1952)
- Gloster Meteor F.8 (April 1952 – March 1955)
- Hawker Hunter F.1 (February 1955 – September 1955)
- Hawker Hunter F.4 (September 1955 – January 1957)
- Hawker Hunter F.6 (January 1957 – March 1960)
- Hawker Hunter FGA.9 (March 1960 – September 1969)
- McDonnell Douglas Phantom FGR.2 (September 1969 – April 1974)
- SEPECAT Jaguar GR.1 (April 1974 – 1999)
- SEPECAT Jaguar GR.3 (June 1999 – March 2005)
- Boeing E-3D Sentry AEW.1 (September 2005 – September 2021)
- Hawker Siddeley Nimrod R.1 (September 2005 – June 2011)
- Raytheon Sentinel R.1 (2008 – February 2021)
- Beechcraft Shadow R.1 (2009 – present)
- Boeing RC-135W Airseeker R.1 (2011 – present)
- General Atomics MQ-9 Reaper
- Boeing Poseidon MRA.1 (October 2019 – present)
- Protector RG1 (2023–Present)

== Heritage ==
The squadron's badge features a lion rampant semée de lys. The badge combines features of the arms of France and Flanders, commemorating the squadron's battles on the Western Front during the First World War. It was approved by King George VI.

The squadron's motto is Audax omnia perpeti (Latin for 'Boldness endures anything').

== Battle honours ==
No. 54 Squadron has received the following battle honours. Those marked with an asterisk (*) may be emblazoned on the squadron standard.

- Western Front (1916–1918)
- Arras*
- Ypres (1917)
- Cambrai (1917)*
- Amiens*
- Home Defence (1940-1945)
- France and Low Countries (1940)
- Dunkirk*
- Battle of Britain (1940)*
- Fortress Europe (1941)*
- Eastern Waters (1943-1945)*
- Gulf (1991)

== Locations ==
Wartime locations included:
Locations in Britain

- 3 September 1939 – RAF Hornchurch, Hornchurch, Essex
- September 1940 – RAF Catterick, Catterick, North Yorkshire
- February 1941 – RAF Hornchurch, Hornchurch, Essex
- November 1941 – RAF Castletown, Castletown, Scotland
- June 1942 – RAF Wellingore, Lincolnshire

Locations in Australia:

- 13 August 1942: Ascot Vale, Melbourne, Victoria
- 24 August 1942: Richmond, Sydney, New South Wales
- 13 January 1943: Sydney, New South Wales
- 25 January 1943: Parap Airfield, Darwin, Northern Territory
- 9 May 1944: Potshot, Exmouth Gulf, Western Australia
- 19 May 1944: Livingstone Airfield, Northern Territory
- 23 October 1945: Parap Airfield, Darwin, Northern Territory
- 30 October 1945: Melbourne, Victoria

== See also ==
- List of Royal Air Force aircraft squadrons
