= Gerald Gordon Bell =

Canadian World War I flying ace

- Born: 11 June 1890; Ottawa, Ontario, Canada
- Died: 7 October 1970 (aged 80)
- Military career
- Allegiance: Canada; United Kingdom (Note: Canadian airmen were required to complete an Attestation Paper in which they declared an oath of allegiance to King George V and agreed to serve in any arm of the service for the duration of the war between Great Britain and Germany.)
- Branch: Canadian Expeditionary Force; Royal Flying Corps; Royal Air Force
- Service years: 1914–1919
- Rank: Captain
- Units: Governor General's Foot Guards; 38th Battalion, CEF; Eastern Ontario Regiment; No. 22 Squadron RFC; No. 47 Squadron RFC/RAF; No. 150 Squadron RAF
- Conflicts: World War I; Western Front; Macedonian front
- Awards: Distinguished Flying Cross; Legion of Honour (France)

Captain Gerald Gordon Bell DFC (11 June 1890 – 7 October 1970) was a Canadian First World War flying ace, officially credited with sixteen aerial victories while serving in the British Royal Flying Corps and Royal Air Force.

== World War I ==
Bell was born in Ottawa, Ontario, Canada, and was working as a mechanical engineer on the outbreak of the war. He served in the Governor General's Foot Guards, before signing attestation papers for service overseas on 1 February 1915, and was assigned to the 38th Battalion, Canadian Expeditionary Force, with the rank of lieutenant. According to his service record his father was by then dead, so he gave his mother as his next of kin. The 38th Battalion remained in Canada until 14 August 1915, when it was transferred to Bermuda to serve as part of the garrison. In May 1916 it sailed for England, and served in France from 13 August, seeing action in the Battle of the Somme.

On 2 January 1917 Bell was seconded to the Royal Flying Corps as an observer on probation, also being attached to the Eastern Ontario Regiment. After training in England, on 15 February he returned to France to serve in No. 22 Squadron RFC. He was also promoted to captain in the Eastern Ontario Regiment on 19 March. Flying in a F.E.2b two-seater Bell gained his first aerial victory on 8 April, with Lieutenant L. W. Beale as pilot, sharing with five other aircraft of his flight in the destruction of an Albatros D.II over Regny. On 3 May, with Second Lieutenant E. A. H. Ward as his pilot, he destroyed an Albatros D.III, and on 15 May his period of probation came to an end and he was appointed a flying officer (observer) with seniority from 9 January. On 29 July, Bell and Ward, destroyed an enemy two-seater over Tortequesne.

Bell then returned to England to train as a pilot, attending the No. 1 School of Military Aeronautics at Reading from 13 August 1917, then being posted to No. 12 Training Squadron on 20 September, and to No. 83 Squadron RFC on 13 October. Within a week he was sent to Egypt, assigned to a Training Brigade, and completed a course in aerial gunnery at the Aerial Fighting School at RFC Heliopolis.

On 19 December 1917 Bell was appointed a flying officer, with seniority from 9 January. He was sent to Salonika to join No. 47 Squadron RFC operating on the Macedonian front. On 13 April 1918, flying a S.E.5a single-seat fighter, he destroyed an Albatros D.III. Bell was promoted to the temporary rank of captain on 13 June, to serve in a new unit, No. 150 Squadron RAF, formed from flights detached from No. 47 and No. 17 Squadrons. There Bell gained the remainder of his victories, accounting for twelve more enemy aircraft between 13 May and 18 September 1918.

On 2 November 1918 he was awarded the Distinguished Flying Cross. His citation read:

Lieutenant (Temporary Captain) Gerald Gordon Bell (Eastern Ontario Regiment).

"This officer has had numerous engagements with hostile aircraft, invariably displaying marked gallantry and leadership of a high order, notably on the 1st of June, when he, accompanied by another pilot, attacked a formation of twelve enemy scouts; he shot down one in flames and drove down others out of control, only breaking off the engagement when all his ammunition had been expended."

On 29 February 1919 Bell appeared before a Medical Board, having contracted malaria in Salonika in September 1918; he suffered from intermittent fevers, weakness, and insomnia, and was assessed as being unfit for further service. On 6 May Bell ceased to be seconded to the RAF, relinquishing his commission. On 13 May he was demobilized from the Canadian Expeditionary Force.

On 10 October 1919, he received unrestricted permission to wear the insignia of a Chevalier of the Legion of Honour, conferred on him by France.

=== List of aerial victories ===
Combat record
No.	Date/Time	Aircraft/ Serial No.	Opponent	Result	Location	Notes
No. 22 Squadron RFC
1	8 April 1917 @ 0700	F.E.2b (A5454)	Albatros D.II	Destroyed	Regny	Pilot: Lieutenant L. W. Beale. Shared with Captain Carleton Clement, Lieutenants J. F. A. Day & H. G. Spearpoint, and Second Lieutenants Llewelyn Davies, W. M. Taylor, John V. Aspinall, Medley Parlee, Furlonger, C. W. Lane & J. K. Campbell.
2	3 May 1917 @ 1730	F.E.2b (A855)	Albatros D.III	Destroyed		Pilot: Second Lieutenant E. A. H. Ward
3	29 July 1917 @ 0650	F.E.2b	C	Destroyed	Tortequesne	Pilot: Second Lieutenant E. A. H. Ward
No. 47 Squadron RAF
4	13 April 1918 @ 0730	S.E.5a (B692)	Albatros D.III	Destroyed	1500 yds South of Brajkovic	Shared with Lieutenant Charles Green.
No. 150 Squadron RAF
5	13 May 1918 @ 0800	S.E.5a (B695)	Albatros D.III	Destroyed	Livanovo	Shared with Captain Acheson Goulding.
6	15 May 1918 @ 0530	S.E.5a (B28)	Albatros D.V	Destroyed	Hudova	Shared with Lieutenant Frederick Travers.
7	1 June 1918 @ 1505	S.E.5a (B692)	Siemens-Schuckert D.III	Destroyed	Casandale	
8	15 June 1918 @ 0915	S.E.5a (B692)	Albatros D.V	Destroyed	Marinopolje	Shared with Captain G. M. Brawley & Lieutenant Leslie Hamilton.
9	18 June 1918 @ 0750	S.E.5a (B692)	Albatros D.V	Destroyed	North of Paljorca	Shared with Captain Acheson Goulding.
10	23 June 1918 @ 0745	S.E.5a (B6925)	Albatros D.V	Destroyed	Hill 5401—Rupel Pass	Shared with Lieutenant Leslie Hamilton.
11	9 July 1918 @ 0800	S.E.5a (B6945)	Rumpler C	Destroyed	Angista	
12	19 July 1918 @ 0800	S.E.5a (B692)	Albatros D.V	Destroyed	West of Livanova aerodrome	Shared with Captain G. M. Brawley and Lieutenants Arthur Jarvis & W. Ridley.
13	5 August 1918 @ 0815	S.E.5a (D3495)	Siemens-Schuckert D.III	Destroyed	3000 yds north-west of Hudova	Shared with Lieutenant J. A. Beeny.
14	15 August 1918 @ 1200	S.E.5a (D3495)	LVG C	Destroyed	Seres Uesnik	
15	21 August 1918 @ 0910	S.E.5a (D3495)	LVG C	Destroyed	Girejik—Derbend	
16	18 August 1918 @ 0630	S.E.5a (D3495)	Fokker D	Destroyed	Karali	

== Personal life ==
In 1920, he married Edith Grace Drayton, eldest daughter of Sir Henry and Lady Drayton, in Ottawa.
