= Victor Huston =

Irish air force major

Victor Henry Huston MC
- Born: 13 October 1890; Belfast, County Antrim, Ireland
- Died: 10 April 1941 (aged 50); Coventry, England
- Military career
- Allegiance: Canada; United Kingdom
- Branch: Canadian Expeditionary Force; British Army; Royal Air Force
- Service years: 1914–1919
- Rank: Major
- Units: 11th Hussars; Canadian Army Service Corps; No. 18 Squadron RFC
- Conflicts: World War I
- Awards: Military Cross

Major Victor Henry Huston MC (13 October 1890 – 10 April 1941) was a First World War flying ace credited with six aerial victories. He was the only ace in his squadron.

== Biography ==
=== Background and early life ===
Huston was born in Belfast, Ireland, one of nine children of William Wentworth Huston and Elizabeth Victoria (née Simpson). His parents had lived for some time in Cape Town, South Africa, but had returned to Ireland in 1889. Huston served in the 11th Hussars, before emigrating to Canada, where he married Sarah Bailie in Vancouver in November 1912. His attestation papers describe him as a motor engineer, 5 feet 6 inches (1.68 m) tall, and a member of the Church of England.

=== First World War service ===
Huston enlisted into the Canadian Expeditionary Force in September 1914 and was assigned to the Canadian Army Service Corps. He was commissioned as a lieutenant on 13 September 1915. He was seconded for service in the British Army's Royal Flying Corps on 8 December 1916, and was appointed a flying officer the same day. On 17 December, Huston was posted to No. 18 Squadron RAF to fly the Royal Aircraft Factory F.E.2.

He gained his first victory on 15 February 1917, when he and observer Second Lieutenant P. S. Taylor destroyed a Type C reconnaissance aircraft over Grévillers. On 5 April he and his observer Second Lieutenant Giles Blennerhasset were credited with two Albatros D.IIs driven down out of control over Inchy. Huston was then paired with observer Lieutenant E. A. Foord for his remaining three victories, destroying an Albatros D.III on 24 April, then a Halberstadt D north-west of Cambrai on 13 May. Huston shared his sixth and final victory with Flight Sub-Lieutenant Harold Spencer Kerby, both pilots being credited with destroying an Albatros D.V north-west of Havrincourt on 27 May.

On 18 June 1917 Huston was awarded the Military Cross. His citation read:

Lieutenant Victor Henry Huston, Canadian Army Service Corps and Royal Flying Corps.

"For conspicuous gallantry and devotion to duty. He has rendered valuable service when on photographic reconnaissance. He has always shown the greatest skill and courage in leading attacks on hostile machines, and thus enabling valuable photographs to be secured behind the lines."

Huston left No. 18 Squadron on 8 July 1917. He was promoted to captain in the Canadian Army Service Corps on 5 August 1917, but remained seconded to the RFC. He received a special appointment as a flight commander on 20 March 1918.

On 1 April 1918, the Royal Flying Corps and the Royal Naval Air Service (RNAS) were merged to form the Royal Air Force. In August 1918, Huston, now a temporary major in the RAF, sailed for Chile. The Chilean Army had founded a School of Military Aeronautics in 1913 to train pilots, but the war in Europe meant that they had difficulties in obtaining modern aircraft, and had to use obsolete pre-war machines. However, in 1918 the British, as part of their compensation for the requestioning in 1914 of the two Almirante Latorre-class battleships that were being built for Chile in England, supplied them with a number of aircraft, and Huston was sent to serve as Chief Instructor to the Servicio de Aviación Militar de Chile (transl. "Chilean Military Aviation Service").

While there Huston was also instrumental in Lieutenant Dagoberto Godoy's first flight over the Andes in a Bristol M.1c on 12 December 1918, and he also made the first flight of a seaplane in Chile, piloting a naval Sopwith Baby at Talcahuano on 3 July 1919. Huston also contributed to the creation of an independent Chilean Air Force, stating in a letter to the military authorities that: "The air service in Chile must be a single branch dependent only on the Ministry of War and Navy." Huston was subsequently awarded the Chilean Order of Merit.

Huston's secondment to the Royal Air Force ended on 30 September 1919, and he relinquished his RAF commission as a flight lieutenant to return to the Canadian Army as a captain.

=== Post war life ===
Huston returned to England and lived in London, but was fatally injured during the Second World War in an air raid on Coventry, where he died at Gulson Road Hospital on 10 April 1941.
