= Giles Blennerhasset =

Irish flying officer

Giles Noble Blennerhassett MC
- Born: 16 April 1895; Leoville, Sligo, Ireland
- Died: 4 December 1978 (aged 83)
- Military career
- Allegiance: United Kingdom
- Branch: British Army; Royal Air Force
- Service years: 1916–1921
- Rank: Flying officer
- Units: Royal Irish Fusiliers; No. 18 Squadron RFC; No. 78 Squadron RFC; No. 112 Squadron RFC; No. 153 Squadron RFC; No. 39 Squadron RFC; No. 48 Squadron RAF
- Conflicts: World War I; Western Front
- Awards: Military Cross

Flying Officer Giles Noble Blennerhassett MC (16 April 1895 – 4 December 1978) was an Irish World War I flying ace credited with eight aerial victories while serving as an observer/gunner in No. 18 Squadron, Royal Flying Corps.

== Early life and background ==
Blennerhassett was born in Leoville, County Sligo, the eldest, and only son, of the four children born to James Blennerhassett of Gortatlea, County Kerry, and his first wife Selina Harriet (née Noble) of Collooney, County Sligo. His father was the bookkeeper/accountant at the Henry Lyons & Co. department store in Sligo, later becoming the managing director. The young Blennerhassett was educated at Sligo Grammar School.

== World War I ==
Blennerhassett trained in the Inns of Court Officers Training Corps, before being commissioned as a second lieutenant in the 4th Battalion, Royal Irish Fusiliers on 2 June 1916. He was eventually seconded to the Royal Flying Corps, being appointed a flying officer (observer) on 24 March 1917, with seniority from 31 December 1916.

Posted to No. 18 Squadron RFC to fly in F.E.2b two-seaters, he gained his first aerial victory on 4 February 1917, driving down out of control an Albatros D.II fighter. He drove down two more on 5 April, and destroyed another the following day. He gained his fifth to become an ace on 16 April, and then accounted for three Albatros D.IIIs, one on 3 May and two more on 23 May, to bring his total to eight.

Blennerhasset was posted to the Home Establishment on 19 July, and was awarded the Military Cross five days later. His citation read:

Second Lieutenant Giles Noble Blennerhassett, Royal Irish Fusiliers, Special Reserve, and Royal Flying Corps. "For conspicuous gallantry and devotion to duty. He has shown great skill and courage when, acting as escort in attacking hostile formations. On one occasion he attacked two hostile machines, driving down both out of control. Later, he forced three other machines down.

He subsequently qualified as a pilot, being promoted to lieutenant on 2 December 1917, and appointed a flying officer the next day. and then serving in No.'s 78, 112, 153 and 39 Home Defence squadrons.

On 1 April 1918, the Army's Royal Flying Corps and the Royal Naval Air Service (RNAS) were merged to form the Royal Air Force, and Blennerhassett relinquished his commission in the Royal Irish Fusiliers that day.

On 11 November 1918 he was appointed an acting captain.

=== List of aerial victories ===
Combat record
| No. | Date/Time | Aircraft/ Serial No. | Opponent | Result | Location | Notes |
|---|---|---|---|---|---|---|
| 1 | 4 February 1917 @ 1600 | F.E.2b (A5460) | Albatros D.II | Out of control | North of Le Sars | Pilot: Second Lieutenant Robert Farquhar. |
| 2 | 5 April 1917 @ 1200 | F.E.2b (4969) | Albatros D.II | Out of control | Inchy | Pilot: Second Lieutenant Victor Huston. |
| 3 | 5 April 1917 @ 1200 | F.E.2b (4969) | Albatros D.II | Out of control | Inchy | Pilot: Second Lieutenant Victor Huston. |
| 4 | 6 April 1917 @ 1000 | F.E.2b (A5468) | Albatros D.II | Destroyed | Beaumetz—Beugny | Pilot: Second Lieutenant Reid. Shared with Second Lieutenant C. Parkinson and Second Lieutenant Power. |
| 5 | 16 April 1917 @ 0830 | F.E.2b (A5461) | Albatros D.II | Out of control | Cagnicourt | Pilot: Second Lieutenant S. J. Young. |
| 6 | 3 May 1917 @ 1830 | F.E.2b (A5506) | Albatros D.III | Out of control | Bourlon Wood | Pilot: Captain W. H. Tolhurst. |
| 7 | 23 May 1917 @ 1325 | F.E.2b (7003) | Albatros D.III | Destroyed | East of Eswars | Pilot: Second Lieutenant D. Marshall. |
| 8 | 23 May 1917 @ 1325 | F.E.2b (7003) | Albatros D.III | Out of control | East of Eswars | Pilot: Second Lieutenant D. Marshall. |

== Postwar career ==
On 24 October 1919 Blennerhassett was granted short service commission in the RAF with the rank of flying officer. He served in No. 48 Squadron RAF in India, before resigning his commission on 19 January 1922.

== Personal life ==
As a lay representative of the Church of Ireland he donated the Bishop's Throne to St John the Baptist Cathedral, Sligo, in memory of his father. He married twice; first to Kathleen Maud Curry of Newbridge, County Kildare at Aldershot, Hampshire on 8 January 1918, and secondly to Dorothy Margaret Pinnock in 1932.

Blennerhassett died on 4 December 1978, and is commemorated on the Great War Roll of Honour in Sligo Cathedral.
