= Acheson Goulding =

Canadian World War I flying ace

Acheson Gosford Goulding
- Born: 16 May 1893; Stony Mountain, Manitoba, Canada
- Died: 27 April 1951 (aged 57); Fort Garry, Winnipeg, Manitoba, Canada
- Military career
- Allegiance: Canada; United Kingdom
- Branch: Canadian Expeditionary Force; Royal Flying Corps; Royal Canadian Air Force
- Rank: Group Captain
- Units: No. 17 Squadron RAF, No. 150 Squadron RAF
- Awards: Military Cross, Distinguished Flying Cross, French Croix de Guerre

Group Captain Acheson Gosford Goulding DFC MC (16 May 1893 – 27 April 1951) was a Canadian World War I flying ace credited with 21 aerial victories. After infantry service, he transferred to aviation and served in Asia Minor and the Balkans. After winning the Military Cross for courage, he returned to civilian life. He gave up a business career to return to service for World War II as a Group Captain. *aerial victories source: Manitoba Historical Society.

== Early life ==
Goulding was born at Stony Mountain, Manitoba, Canada, on 16 May 1893. Goulding was educated at St. John's College and the University of Manitoba at Winnipeg. His enlistment form for World War I service still exists. On the form, he named Gwendolyn Marie Goulding as his next of kin, gave his civilian occupation as clerk, and his home of record as Winnipeg. His physical examination measured him as 5 feet 8 1/2 inches tall, and described him as having a medium complexion, with blue eyes and brown hair. He swore allegiance to King George V and joined the 28th (Northwest) Battalion, CEF on 14 December 1914.

== World War I ==
Goulding transferred from infantry to the Royal Flying Corps and was posted to 17 Squadron. While he had enlisted as a private with regimental number 74142 in 28th Battalion, he served as a lieutenant with 17 Squadron, and as a captain after transfer to 150 Squadron. He was commissioned on 29 June 1916, and seconded to the RFC on 18 September 1916. His joining date for 17 Squadron was in February 1917; he was appointed a Flying Officer on 23 February 1917.

Goulding's squadron was tasked with supporting British troops opposing Bulgarian troops in Macedonia. In May 1917, he was one of two pilots who bombed a Bulgarian supply train of 26 wagons, stampeding the draught horses and smashing military supplies. Goulding was awarded the Military Cross on 26 October 1917; he had flown many ground support and reconnaissance missions, but had no success on combat patrols until 28 January 1918. After Goulding's first five victories, he became a Flight Commander in 150 Squadron with the temporary rank of captain on 26 April 1918. He scored four more wins in May and June 1918.

On 21 September 1918, Goulding was awarded the French Croix de Guerre.

== List of aerial victories ==
See also Aerial victory standards of World War I

No.	Date/time	Aircraft	Foe	Result	Location	Notes
1	28 January 1918 @ 1130 hours	Nieuport serial number 5574	DFW C.V	Captured	South of Angista, Greece	Victory shared with Gerald Ernest Gibbs
2	20 March 1918 @ 0930 hours	Royal Aircraft Factory SE.5a s/n B690	DFW C.V	Captured	Cepista	Victory shared with Gerald Ernest Gibbs
3	24 March 1918 @ 0700 hours	Royal Aircraft Factory SE.5a s/n B690	Albatros D.III	Driven down out of control	Tolo, Greece	
4	21 April 1918 @ 1115 hours	Royal Aircraft Factory SE.5a s/n B690	DFW reconnaissance plane	Driven down out of control	Barakli-Dzuma	Victory shared with Leslie Hamilton
5	25 April 1918 @ 1000 hours	Royal Aircraft Factory SE.5a s/n B690	DFW reconnaissance plane	Driven down out of control	Angista	Victory shared with Arthur Jarvis
6	10 May 1918 @ 0800 hours	Royal Aircraft Factory SE.5a s/n B28	Pfalz D.III	Destroyed	North of Levunovo	Victory shared with Charles D. B. Green
7	13 May 1918 @ 0800 hours	Royal Aircraft Factory SE.5a s/n B28	Albatros D.III	Driven down out of control	Levunovo	Victory shared with Gerald Gordon Bell
8	28 May 1918 @ 1500 hours	Royal Aircraft Factory SE.5a s/n B690	DFW reconnaissance plane	Set afire; destroyed	East of Vardarhohe	Victory shared with Frederick Travers
9	18 June 1918 @ 0750 hours	Royal Aircraft Factory SE.5a s/n B163	Albatros D.V	Destroyed	North of Paljorca	Victory shared with Gerald Gordon Bell

== Post World War I ==
On 1 January 1919, Goulding was awarded the Distinguished Flying Cross. On 9 April 1919, he gave up his Royal Air Force commission to return to army duty as an acting captain in the Nova Scotia Regiment.

Goulding returned to Canada to run a construction firm in Winnipeg. He would serve his country again during World War II, joining the Royal Canadian Air Force in May 1940. After service as a staff officer, he commanded No. 18 Flying Training Service School at Gimli, Manitoba while serving as a group captain.

Goulding died in Fort Garry, Winnipeg, Manitoba, Canada, on 27 April 1951.
