= No. 150 Squadron RAF =

Defunct flying squadron of the Royal Air Force

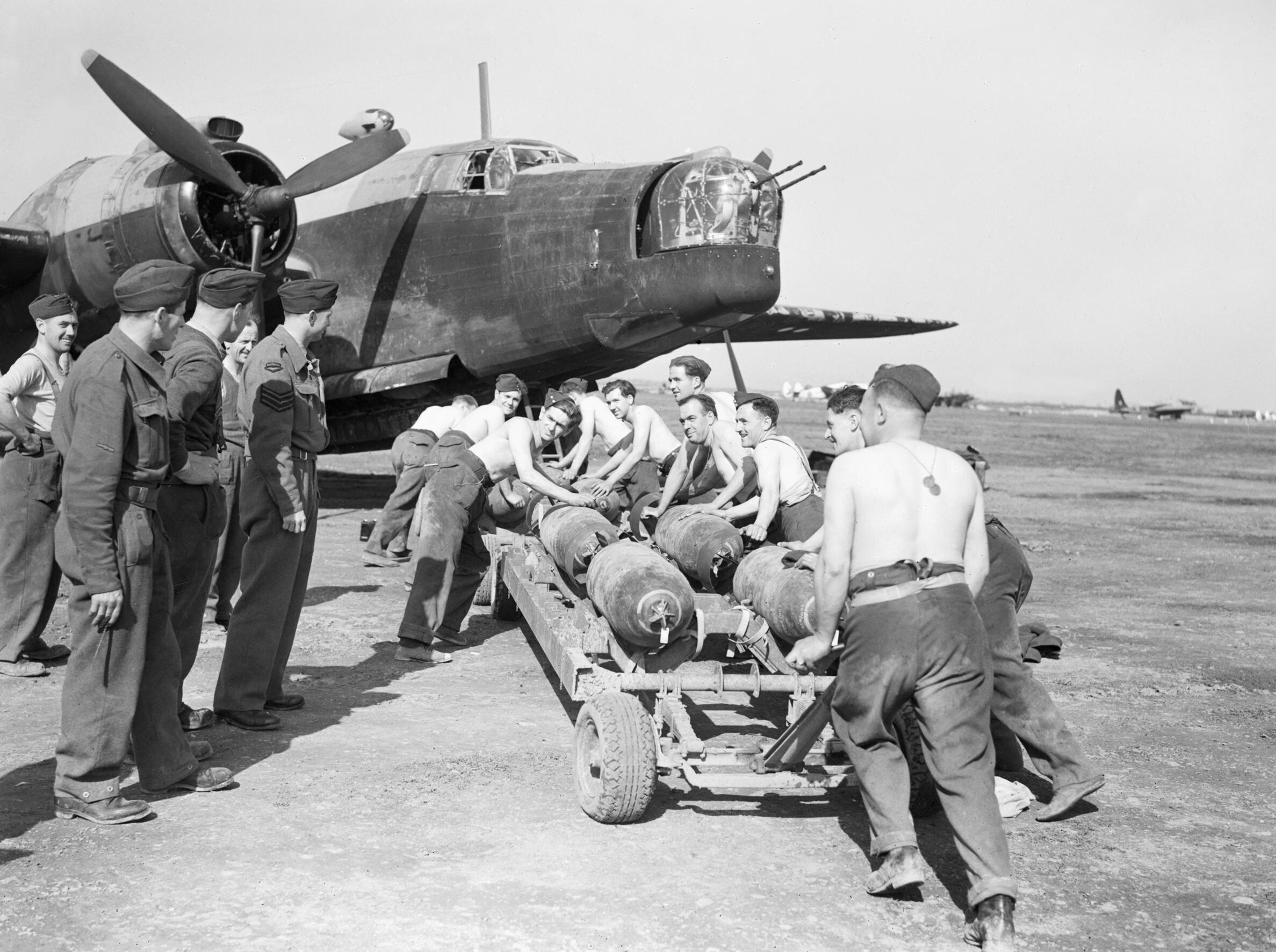
- A Vickers Wellington of 150 Squadron being prepared for a night raid on Bizerte
- Active: 1918–1919; 1938–1945; 1959–1963
- Disbanded: 9 April 1963
- Country: United Kingdom
- Branch: Royal Air Force
- Role: Fighter; Heavy bomber; Medium-range ballistic missile
- Formed at: Salonika, Greece
- Mottos: Αιει Φθανομεν (Greek for 'Always Ahead')
- Engagements: First World War; Macedonian front; Second World War; Cold War

Insignia
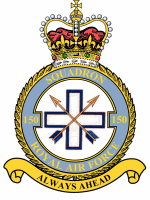
- Squadron badge (Note: In front of a cross voided, two arrows in saltire, the points uppermost. The cross is adopted in reference to the arms of Greece.)

Aircraft flown
- Bomber: Fairey Battle; Vickers Wellington; Avro Lancaster
- Fighter: Bristol M.1c; Royal Aircraft Factory SE.5a; Sopwith Camel

No. 150 Squadron RAF was an aircraft squadron of the Royal Air Force during World War I and World War II. In the early 1960s it was briefly reformed as a Strategic Missile squadron operating the Thor IRBM.

== World War I ==
The squadron was founded on 1 April 1918 at Salonika, Greece from the fighter flights of No. 17 Squadron RAF and No. 47 Squadron RAF, as a dedicated fighter squadron for the Macedonian front. It was initially equipped with Bristol M.1c monoplanes from 47 Squadron, Royal Aircraft Factory SE.5as from 17 Squadron, supplemented with some Nieuport 17s from the French Air Service. On 7 May, a third flight formed equipped with Sopwith Camels. Ten aces served with the unit, including such notables as Gerald Gordon Bell, Charles D. B. Green, Douglas Arthur Davies, Acheson Goulding, Frederick Dudley Travers, Franklin Saunders, Arthur Jarvis, George Gardiner, and Leslie Hamilton.

== World War II ==
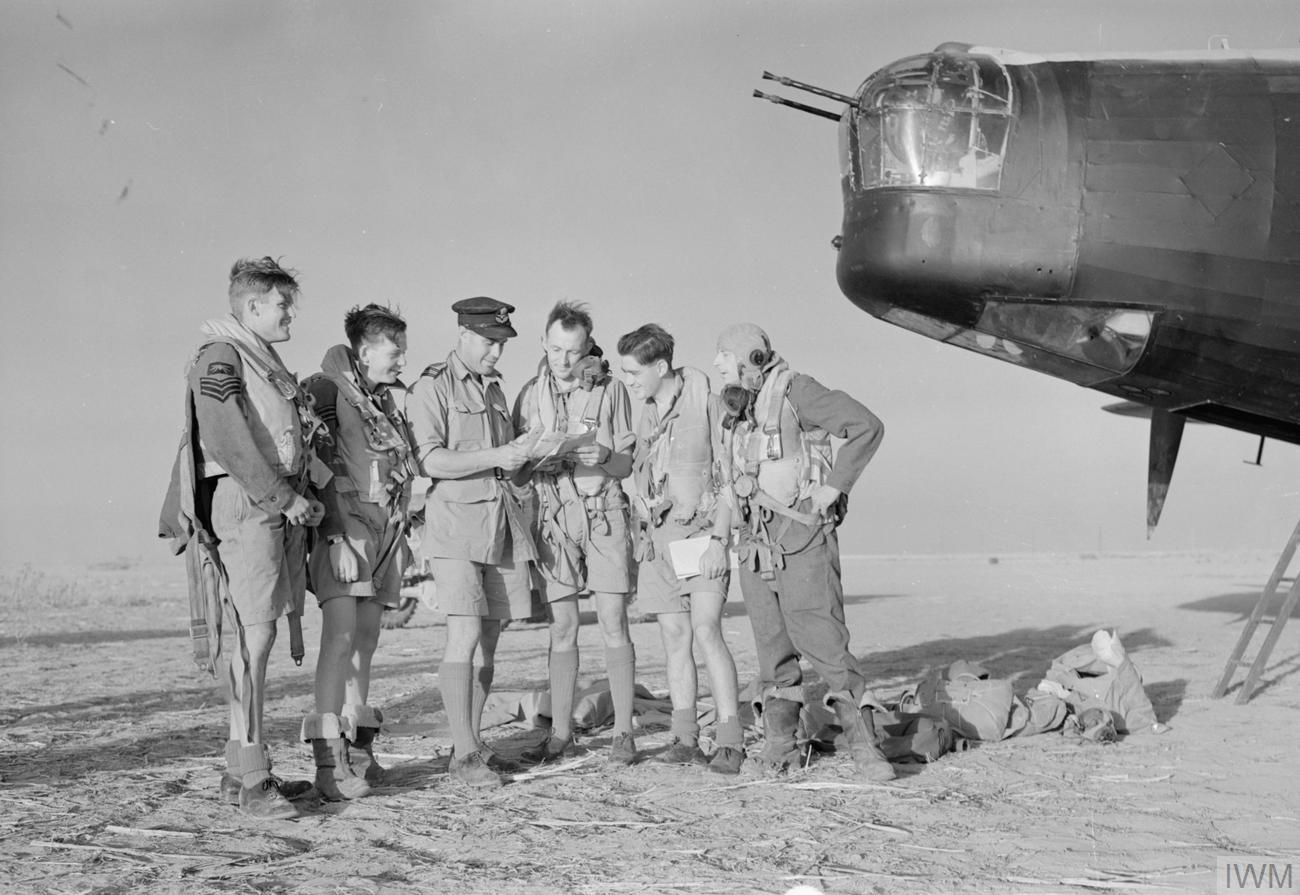
No. 150 Squadron Wellington crew are briefed at Kairouan, Tunisia, for a raid on targets in the Salerno area. (Note: The photograph is captioned by the Imperial War Museum as being a briefing conducted by S/L Langlois RAAF, the then CO. In fact, the officer shown was almost certainly his successor, Squadron Leader W.Desmond Boxwell DFC, who was immortalised in "The Wimpy Song" celebrating the Desert Air Force and sung to a Bowdlerised version of Lily Marlene.)

It reformed in 1938 equipped with Fairey Battle light bombers, taking them to France as part of the Advanced Air Striking Force in September 1939. It received heavy losses in attempting to oppose the German invasion of France in May 1940, being evacuated back to England by 20 May.

It re-equipped with Vickers Wellingtons in October 1940, at RAF Newton. It moved to RAF Snaith in July 1941 becoming operational with Vickers Wellington 1Cs. It moved to the Mediterranean Theatre in December 1942, flying its Wellingtons from Blida in Algeria against targets in Tunisia and Sardinia. It moved to Tunisia in May 1943, and to bases in Italy in December, disbanding in October 1944.

It reformed again in November 1944 at RAF Fiskerton in Lincolnshire, equipped with the Avro Lancaster heavy bomber. It soon moved to RAF Hemswell, flying 827 operational sorties and dropping 3,827 tons of bombs while losing eight aircraft and 40 aircrew. It was involved in Operation Manna to drop food supplies to starving Dutch civilians at the end of the War in Europe, and after the end of hostilities, was used to repatriate POWs from Europe back to the United Kingdom. It was disbanded again on 7 November 1945.

== Cold war ==
The squadron was reformed – as No. 150 (SM) Squadron – on 8 January 1959 as one of 20 Strategic Missile (SM) squadrons associated with Project Emily. The squadron was equipped with three Thor Intermediate range ballistic missiles, and based at RAF Carnaby in Yorkshire. In October 1962, during the Cuban Missile Crisis, the squadron was kept at full readiness, with the missiles aimed at strategic targets in the USSR. The squadron was disbanded on 9 April 1963, as the Thor Program in Britain was brought to a close.

== Notable pilots ==
- Gordon Cochrane
- Erin Jasper Walker
- Malcolm James Larke Blunt
