= Douglas Arthur Davies =

- Born: 12 January 1896; Harrow, Middlesex, England
- Died: 1992 (aged 95–96)
- Military career
- Allegiance: United Kingdom
- Branch: British Army; Royal Air Force
- Service years: 1915–1921; 1940–1954
- Rank: Wing commander
- Unit: No. 150 Squadron RAF
- Awards: Distinguished Flying Cross; Croix de guerre (France)

Wing Commander Douglas Arthur Davies DFC (12 January 1896 – 1992) was an officer of the British Royal Air Force, who was credited with 10 aerial victories in World War I, and also served during World War II.

== Early life ==
Davies was born in Harrow, England, the first-born son of Mr. and Mrs. Arthur Davies.

== World War I ==
On 17 October 1915, he was commissioned second lieutenant in the Wiltshire Regiment. On 20 November 1917, he was seconded to the Royal Flying Corps as a lieutenant and a flying officer.

By mid-1918, Davies was posted to 150 Squadron in Salonika as a Sopwith Camel pilot. He scored his first aerial victories on 12 June 1918, when he set one Albatros D.V afire and destroyed another. His second successful day saw him become an ace, as he destroyed two more Albatros D.Vs in one dogfight on 17 July, then drove another down out of control an hour and a half later. Six days later, he teamed with John Preston to destroy another. On 8 August, he drove down two enemy fighters out of control. Ten days later, he rounded off his victory string by driving down another pair of Albatros D.Vs out of control.

He earned the Distinguished Flying Cross for his prowess. It was announced in The London Gazette on 2 November 1918:

"This officer sets a fine example of gallantry and courage, notably on two occasions. On the 12th of June he, single-handed, engaged four enemy scouts, one of which he shot down in flames and a second out of control; the latter was seen to catch fire on reaching the ground. Some weeks later he led his patrol of four scouts against a formation of eleven hostile machines; two of these were shot down in flames, the wings fell off another, and the remainder dispersed."

=== List of aerial victories ===
All victories gained while posted to No. 150 Squadron based at Salonika, Greece.

No.	Date/time	Aircraft	Foe	Result	Location	Notes
1	12 June 1918 @ 0600 hours	Sopwith Camel; No. C1599	Albatros D.V	Destroyed by fire	North of Guevgueli	
2	12 June 1918 @ 0800 hours	Sopwith Camel; No. C1599	Albatros D.V	Destroyed	North of Guevgueli	
3	17 July 1918 @ 0735 hours	Sopwith Camel; No. C1599	Albatros D.V	Destroyed	Hudova	
4	17 July 1918 @ 0735 hours	Sopwith Camel; No. C1599	Albatros D.V	Destroyed	Hudova	
5	17 July 1918 @ approx. 0900 hours	Sopwith Camel; No. C1599	Albatros D.V	Driven down out of control	Balinge	
6	23 July 1918 @ 0730 hours	Sopwith Camel; No. C1599	Albatros D.V	Destroyed	Northeast of Boluntili	Shared with John Carbery Preston
7	8 August 1918 @ approx. 0800 hours	Sopwith Camel; No. C1599	Enemy fighter plane	Driven down out of control	Piravo	
8	8 August 1918 @ 0810 hours	Sopwith Camel; No. C1599	Enemy fighter	Driven down out of control	Boluntili	
9	18 August 1918 @ 0745 hours	Sopwith Camel; No. C1599	Albatros D.V	Driven down out of control	North of Lake Doiran	
10	18 August 1918 @ 0745 hours	Sopwith Camel; No. C1599	Albatros D.V	Driven down out of control	North of Lake Doiran	

== Between the wars ==
On 10 October 1919, Davies was awarded the French Croix de guerre avec Palme. On 17 December 1919, he transferred to the Royal Air Force's unemployed list. On 30 September 1921, he surrendered his commission in his regiment.

In May 1923, his engagement to Muriel Wilson was announced in Flight magazine.

On 26 January 1937, he was commissioned as a pilot officer (Class BB) in the RAF Reserve.

== World War II ==
On 12 October 1940, Davies was confirmed in rank as a pilot officer. He later was granted the war substantive rank of flight lieutenant, dating from 28 September 1940. On 1 January 1944, he was promoted to squadron leader in the Administration & Special Duties Branch of RAF.

== Post World War II ==
On 1 November 1947, Davies relinquished his commission as a flight lieutenant in the Royal Air Force Volunteer Reserve. On 1 January 1948, he surrendered his war substantive rank of squadron leader in the RAF Volunteer Reserve while retaining the rank of flight lieutenant. On 10 February 1954, Flight Lieutenant Davies relinquished his commission in RAF Volunteer Reserve, retaining the rank of wing commander. Davies was stationed to Kuwait as the RAF's attaché to Kuwait's air force from 1955 to 1958. He returned to Kuwait twice as a civilian, once in 1962 and once again in 1965. In 1966 during a "very tense meeting" that had "turned nasty" and "confrontational" between members of the Egyptian Air Force and members of the RAF in London, Davies told a group of Egyptian air force officers that if they went to war with Israel "they would lose and lose badly." In 1967 Davies was outspokenly supportive of Israel during the Six-Day War, and he advocated a closer relationship between Britain and Israel. During the Iran–Iraq War he warned against Britain arming Iraq, and he viewed the entire conflict as being potentially dangerous to Kuwait. After Saddam Hussein invaded Kuwait, Davies was strongly supportive of U.S. and British policy with regards to using force to remove Saddam Hussein's forces from Kuwait during the Gulf War.
