= Charles D. B. Green =

Canadian World War I flying ace

Charles Duncan Bremner Green
- Born: August 14, 1897
- Died: October 3, 1941 (aged 44); Toronto, Canada
- Burial place: Toronto, Canada
- Military career
- Allegiance: King George V of the British Empire
- Branch: Royal Flying Corps
- Rank: Squadron Leader
- Units: No. 47 Squadron RAF, No. 150 Squadron RAF
- Awards: Distinguished Flying Cross, French Croix de Guerre, General Service Medal, and the Canadian Volunteer Service Medal

Lieutenant Charles Duncan Bremner Green DFC (August 14, 1897 – October 3, 1941) was a Canadian World War I flying ace credited with 11 aerial victories. Postwar, he went on to success in business until World War II. After rejoining military life, he again served until his untimely accidental death.

== Early life ==
Charles Duncan Bremner Green was the son of Charles and Annie Henderson Green. He was born at sea while his parents were en route to Australia.

== World War I ==
Green began his military service with the 164th (Halton and Dufferin) Battalion, CEF, with whom he enlisted. He transferred to the Royal Flying Corps, and was rated as a Flying Officer while still a lieutenant, on December 22, 1917.

He was stationed in Salonika, Greece with B Flight of 47 Squadron as a pilot of Royal Aircraft Factory SE.5as. On April 13, 1918, he and fellow Canadian Gerald Gordon Bell destroyed an enemy Albatros D.III.

When 47 Squadron's fighter flights were incorporated into forming the newly 150 Squadron, Green went with them. On May 6, he began a string of ten triumphs with his new squadron by driving down a DFW reconnaissance foe. He accrued victories one or two at a time until July 18, 1918. By then, he had destroyed six enemy planes, including the one shared with Bell and another shared with Acheson Goulding. He had also driven down five other opponents out of control.

== Post World War I ==
Green was finally awarded a Distinguished Flying Cross on January 1, 1919.

After his return to Toronto, he married Marion Wilton Baillie, age 22, on June 9, 1923. They had three children: Bremner, Donald, and Elizabeth. He began work as a broker for Amelius Jarvis and Company, and continued with this company until 1939.

== World War II ==
Although he was married with three children when World War II broke out, he re-enlisted, this time in the Royal Canadian Air Force. He served near his home at Camp Borden as an instructor, with the rank of Squadron Leader. His service in this post saw him rewarded with the General Service Medal and the Canadian Volunteer Service Medal.

In the autumn of 1941, he went to hospital for treatment of an old wound. While being treated, he toppled off the hospital's balcony to his death on October 3, 1941. He died without a will, and was buried in Mount Pleasant Cemetery in Toronto.
