= Hugh Malcolm =

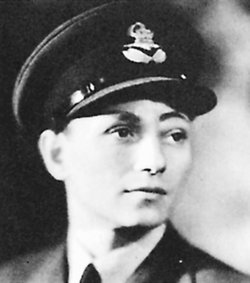
- Born: 2 May 1917; Broughty Ferry, Dundee, Scotland
- Died: 4 December 1942 (aged 25) near Bizerta, French Tunisia
- Burial place: Beja War Cemetery, Tunisia
- Military career
- Allegiance: United Kingdom
- Branch: Royal Air Force
- Service years: 1936–1942
- Rank: Wing Commander
- Commands: No. 18 Squadron RAF
- Conflicts: Second World War: North African campaign; Tunisian campaign †
- Awards: Victoria Cross

Wing Commander Hugh Gordon Malcolm, VC (2 May 1917 – 4 December 1942) was a Scottish airman. He was awarded the Victoria Cross, the highest award for gallantry in the face of the enemy that can be awarded to British and Commonwealth forces, posthumously for "valour and unswerving devotion to duty" flying light bombers in the North Africa campaign .

== Early life ==
Malcolm was born in Broughty Ferry, Dundee, and educated at Craigflower Preparatory School near Dunfermline and Glenalmond College in Perthshire. He entered the Royal Air Force College Cranwell on 9 January 1936, receiving a commission in 1937. In January 1938, Malcolm joined No. 26 (Army Co-operation) Squadron at Catterick. In May 1939, he suffered a serious head injury in a Westland Lysander crash. It was thought he would not be able to return to flying but he recovered and rejoined his squadron in September.

== Second World War ==
When the war started, Malcolm was serving with No. 17 Training Group. he was promoted to flight lieutenant in September 1940 In December 1941 he was promoted to temporary squadron leader and was Air Liaison Officer on Lieutenant General Bernard Montgomery's general staff.

By the end of 1941 Malcolm had risen to the rank of squadron leader and joined No. 18 Squadron as a flight commander, flying the Bristol Blenheim light bomber and based in Suffolk. The squadron flew Mark IV aircraft attacking German night fighter airfields in support of Bomber Command raids.

In September 1942 he was promoted to acting wing commander before the squadron moved to North Africa to join 326 Wing.

During late 1942 in North Africa, Wing Commander Malcolm assumed command of No. 18 Squadron, flying the new Mk. V version of the Bristol Blenheim light bomber. Throughout his service in that sector, "his leadership, skill and daring were of the highest order". He led two attacks on Bizerta airfield in Tunisia, pressing his attacks to effective conclusion.

On 17 November 1942, the squadron were detailed to carry out an attack on Bizerta, taking advantage of low cloud cover. Twenty miles from the target, the sky cleared, but despite the danger of continuing without a fighter escort, Malcolm decided to go ahead. Despite fierce opposition, the mission was a success with all bombs dropped within the airfield perimeter, and a Junkers Ju 52 and Messerschmitt Bf 109 were shot down, with other enemy aircraft damaged on the ground by machine-gun fire. Two Blenheims were lost to enemy fire and two to an aerial collision. On 28 November 18 Squadron attacked again; despite heavy anti-aircraft fire, after dropping their bombs, the Blenheims attacked repeatedly with machine gun fire.

On the morning of 4 December, he led six Blenheims to the area of Chougui, Tunisia where they attacked a German landing strip before returning to their temporary base at Souk-el-Arba. Shortly after an urgent request for support was received from First Army to attack the area again. Despite the immense danger of attacking without fighter cover Malcolm considered it his duty. Ten aircraft set off in tight formation but one had to crash land only fifteen miles from Souk-el-Arba. On reaching the target, and starting the attack, the squadron was intercepted by an overwhelming force of enemy fighters from I and II. Gruppen JG 53, and 11 Staffel, JG 2. One by one, all his bombers were shot down, until he himself was shot down in flames.

Malcolm's aircraft crashed in flames some 15 miles west of the target. An infantry officer and two other men who arrived at the scene of the crash minutes later retrieved the body of navigator Pilot Officer James Robb. Malcolm, with Robb and gunner Pilot Officer James Grant, were buried in the Beja War Cemetery in a collective grave. Malcolm was posthumously awarded the Victoria Cross on 27 April 1943; for his actions in North Africa and the final sortie. The award stated that "Wing Commander Malcolm's last exploit was the finest example of the valour and unswerving devotion to duty which he constantly displayed". His was the first Royal Air Force Victoria Cross to be won in North Africa campaign.

== Legacy ==
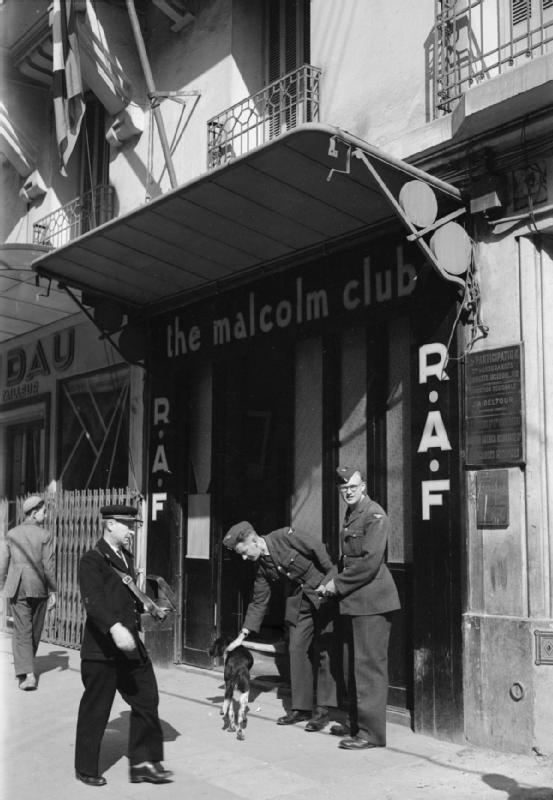
The first Malcolm Club for RAF personnel, Algiers 1944

The RAF's Malcolm Clubs for rest and recreation first set up in North Africa were named in his honour. These were welfare clubs for RAF personnel, which operated in several countries between 1943 and the early 1970s, although the club at RAF Wittering continued until the 1990s. The name had been suggested by Sir Archibald Sinclair, the Secretary of State for Air, during visit to Algiers in 1943 They are mentioned in Queen's Regulations.

Malcolm's Victoria Cross is on display in the Lord Ashcroft collection at the Imperial War Museum, London.
