= Frederick Dudley Travers =

British flying ace

- Born: 15 February 1897; York, England
- Military career
- Allegiance: United Kingdom
- Branch: British Army; Royal Air Force
- Service years: c. 1915–1954
- Rank: Captain
- Units: Hertfordshire Yeomanry; No. 47 Squadron RFC; No. 17 Squadron RFC; No. 150 Squadron RAF
- Conflicts: World War I • Macedonian front
- Awards: Distinguished Flying Cross; Croix de guerre (France)
- Other work: Aviation pioneer in two continents; expert pilot of flying boats

Captain Frederick Dudley Travers DFC (born 15 February 1897; date of death unknown) was an English World War I flying ace credited with nine aerial victories. His later life saw his continued service to his nation in both the Royal Air Force Volunteer Reserve and in civil aviation. He pioneered air routes into Africa, the Middle East, and India. He also became proficient in piloting flying boats. He flew civilian aircraft into the war zones during World War II. By the end of his civil aviation career, he had flown over two million miles and logged 19,000 accident-free flying hours. Upon his retirement from the RAF, he had served for almost four decades.

== Early life ==
Frederick Dudley Travers was born in York, England, on 15 February 1897.

== World War I ==
Travers served initially in the Hertfordshire Yeomanry of the Territorial Force, rising to the rank of lance corporal. He graduated from Inns of Court Officers Training Corps and was commissioned as a second lieutenant on 1 January 1916. He was seconded to the Royal Flying Corps, and first served in No. 47 Squadron. He was promoted to lieutenant in the Yeomanry on 1 July 1917, while still serving in the RFC.

His first aerial victory came on 19 December 1917, flying a B.E.12 in No. 17 Squadron RFC on the Macedonian front. He was then transferred to No. 150 Squadron RAF, to fly the S.E.5a. He gained two more victories in May 1918, and one in June. In September he gained five more victories while flying a Bristol M.1c.

Travers was awarded the Distinguished Flying Cross, which was gazetted on 29 November 1918. His citation read:

"A gallant and able officer who has displayed on many occasions boldness in attack, never hesitating to engage the enemy as opportunity occurs. On June 1st he, in company with two other pilots, attacked a hostile formation of twelve machines; four off these were shot down and the remainder driven off."

He also received the Croix de guerre with Palme from France in February 1919.

=== List of aerial victories ===
Sources
No.	Date/Time	Aircraft	Opponent	Result	Location	Notes
1	19 December 1917 @ 1230 hours	Royal Aircraft Factory B.E.12 serial number 4046	Albatros D.III	Driven down out of control	West of Doiran Lake	
2	15 May 1918 @ 0630 hours	Royal Aircraft Factory SE.5 s/n B688	Albatros D.V	Driven down out of control	Hudova aerodrome	Shared with Gerald Gordon Bell.
3	28 May 1918 @ 1500 hours	Royal Aircraft Factory SE.5a s/n B688	DFW reconnaissance aircraft	Set afire; destroyed	East of Vardarhohe	Shared with Acheson Goulding.
4	1 June 1918 @ 1510 hours	Royal Aircraft Factory SE.5a s/n B690	Albatros D.V	Destroyed	Bogdanci	
5	2 September 1918 @ 0815 hours	Bristol M.1c s/n C4976	LVG reconnaissance aircraft	Set afire; destroyed	Nihor	Shared victory
6	3 September 1918 @ 0815 hours	Bristol M.1c	Albatros D.V	Destroyed	Northwest of Lake Doiran	
7	3 September 1918 @ 0820 hours	Bristol M.1c	Albatros D.V	Destroyed	East of Cerniste	
8	4 September 1918 @ 1055 hours	Bristol M.1c s/n C4976	Reconnaissance aircraft	Destroyed	North of Karasu Bridge	Shared with Leslie Hamilton.
9	16 September 1918 @ 1205 hours	Bristol M.1c s/n C4976	Fokker D.VII	Driven down out of control	Lake Doiran	This victory made Travers the sole ace in this type of aircraft.

== Between the World Wars ==
=== Military career ===
On 5 December 1919, he was granted a short service commission as a flying officer. Travers transferred to the Class A Reserve of the Royal Air Force on 5 December 1922. He kept his reserve status in various capacities until 5 December 1940, when he was ranked as a flight lieutenant.

=== Career in civil aviation ===
Travers began his civil aviation career as an air taxi pilot. On 20 February 1924, he was elected to membership in the Royal Aero Club.

In 1926, he began flying for Imperial Airways; he pioneered air service to Egypt for them that year. Flying from Heliopolis, he opened air routes between Cairo, Baghdad, and Basra.

In 1929, Flight magazine noted that Travers, as senior pilot of the Middle East Division of Imperial Airways had made the first air mail flights to and from India.

== World War II and beyond ==
During World War II, Travers continued in civil aviation; however, he was piloting flying boats from the United Kingdom to India and West Africa. By 1942, Travers was noted as having flown two million air miles.

As part of his sovereign's birthday honours for 1944, Captain Travers was commended for "valuable service in the air" while employed by British Overseas Airways Corporation.

By late 1945, Travers was ferrying a Short Sunderland flying boat to Buenos Aires for Company Dodero Navigation Argentina SA shipping lines.

In early May 1947, Travers was feted at a BOAC luncheon banquet hosted by Lord Knollys to celebrate Travers' retirement from the company after 30 years flying. It was noted that in his 19,000 flying hours, he had never had an accident. Travers' retirement plans included work on development of the Saunders-Roe flying boat.

On 10 February 1954, Frederick Dudley Travers surrendered his commission in the Royal Air Force Reserve of Officers. In his retirement, he made his home in Kenya. He was still alive and available for an interview with famed aviation historian Norman Franks as late as 1968.

== Bibliography ==
- Shores, Christopher F.; Franks, Norman & Guest, Russell F. (1990). Above the Trenches: a Complete Record of the Fighter Aces and Units of the British Empire Air Forces 1915–1920. London, UK: Grub Street. ISBN 978-0-948817-19-9.
- Franks, Norman (2007). SE 5/5a Aces of World War I: Volume 78 of Aircraft of the Aces. Oxford, UK: Osprey Publishing. ISBN 978-1-84603-180-9.
