= George Gardiner (RAF officer) =

George Cecil Gardiner
- Born: 28 March 1892; Poona, India
- Died: 30 July 1940 (aged 48); Helmieh, Egypt
- Burial place: Cairo War Memorial Cemetery
- Military career
- Allegiance: United Kingdom
- Branch: British Army; Royal Air Force
- Service years: c. 1906–1940
- Rank: Group Captain
- Units: 16th (The Queen's) Lancers; Royal Irish Regiment; Machine Gun Corps; No. 14 Squadron RFC; No. 47 Squadron RFC; No. 150 Squadron RAF; No. 84 Squadron RAF; No. 55 Squadron RAF
- Commands: No. 216 Squadron RAF; RAF Helwan
- Conflicts: World War I Iraqi Revolt; World War II
- Awards: Distinguished Service Order; Distinguished Flying Cross; Legion of Honour; Croix de guerre

Group Captain George Cecil Gardiner DSO, DFC (28 March 1892 – 30 July 1940) was a World War I flying ace credited with six aerial victories.

== Background and early life ==
Gardiner was born in Poona, India, the son of Colour Sergeant Charles Gardiner of the Worcestershire Regiment, and Beatrice Gardiner (née Delahay). He attended the Duke of York's Royal Military School in Dover, Kent, from 1901 until 1906, then joined the Army.

== World War I ==
Gardiner was serving as a corporal in the 16th (The Queen's) Lancers when on 10 September 1915 he was commissioned as a second lieutenant "for service in the field" in the Royal Irish Regiment. On 21 May 1916 he was seconded for service with the Machine Gun Corps, and on 6 October he was transferred to the Royal Flying Corps, being appointed a flying officer (observer) on 15 December. He served with No. 14 Squadron RFC in the Middle East, before training as a pilot, and he was appointed a flying officer on 24 June 1917. On 1 July he was promoted to lieutenant, and was assigned to No. 47 Squadron RFC, serving on the Macedonian front. He gained his first victory there on 1 October, over Beles, flying a B.E.12, by driving down an Albatros C out of control. He was wounded in action later in October, but soon returned to flying as he was credited with destroying an Albatros D.III in November, while flying a DH.2. Gardiner gained this victory while repelling an attack, and even though his gun jammed on the fourth shot, infantry below belatedly confirmed the kill.

On 1 April 1918 the Army's Royal Flying Corps was merged with the Royal Naval Air Service to form the Royal Air Force, and the same day Gardiner was one of a number of pilots from No. 47 and No. 17 Squadrons transferred to form a new unit, No. 150 Squadron RAF, based at Salonika. On 3 June, in the King's birthday honours list, he was awarded the Distinguished Flying Cross, and on the 6th, now flying a Sopwith Camel, he gained his third victory, accounting for another Albatros D.III over Mravinca. He then destroyed an Albatros D.V on 12 June, near Pardovica, and another Albatros C east of Cestovo on 25 June, to gain "ace" status. On 28 June he was appointed acting captain, and gained his sixth and final victory on 3 September, with another Albatros D.V destroyed west of Cerniste.

== Inter-war career ==
Gardiner remained in the RAF post-war, being appointed an acting captain for a second time on 1 May 1919, and being made a Chevalier of the Legion of Honour, and receiving the Croix de guerre, from France. He was promoted from flying officer to flight lieutenant on 1 January 1922, while serving with No. 84 Squadron in Iraq. He then returned to the UK, and was posted as a supernumerary officer at the RAF Depot (Inland Area) on 31 March 1922. On 27 August he was posted to the Headquarters of No. 7 Group (Inland Area) for personnel staff duties. Gardiner was then assigned to No. 2 Flying Training School at RAF Duxford on 1 March 1924. On 28 July 1927 he was assigned to the Air Ministry to serve in the Directorate of Training, and between 5 July and 10 October 1928 he was seconded for duty in Estonia. After a short time at the RAF Depot at RAF Uxbridge, he returned to the Air Ministry Directorate of Training on 21 December 1928.

Gardiner was promoted to squadron leader on 14 May 1930, and on 2 January 1931 was posted to No. 55 Squadron based at RAF Hinaidi in Iraq. On 23 June he was awarded the Distinguished Service Order "in recognition of gallant and distinguished service in Iraq". Gardiner was posted to No. 4 Flying Training School at RAF Abu Sueir in Egypt, as Chief Flying Instructor, on 23 October 1934, and also served as an instructor at RAF Hendon in 1935. In June 1936 he was selected for retention on the active list up to the age of 48, which would be in 1940. On 1 January 1937 he was promoted to wing commander, and on the 11th was appointed commander of No. 216 (Bomber Transport) Squadron based at Heliopolis.

== World War II ==
Gardiner was promoted to group captain on 1 March 1940, but "died on active service" at Helmieh Hospital on 30 July 1940 while serving as station commander at RAF Helwan, and was buried at the Cairo War Memorial Cemetery. He was survived by his wife Kathleen August Lyle Gardiner of Tiverton, Devon.
