= Leslie Hamilton =

British flying ace

- Born: Unknown
- Died: c. August 1927 (disappeared); Mid Atlantic Ocean
- Military career
- Allegiance: United Kingdom
- Branch: British Army; Royal Air Force
- Service years: 1916–1919; 1920–1925
- Rank: Flying Officer
- Nickname: The Flying Gypsy
- Units: Royal Engineers; No. 17 Squadron RAF; No. 150 Squadron RAF; No. 24 Squadron RAF
- Conflicts: World War I • Macedonian front
- Awards: Distinguished Flying Cross; Order of the British Empire
- Other work: Disappeared in attempt to fly Atlantic Ocean from east to west.

Flying Officer Leslie Hamilton MBE, DFC, was a British pilot and First World War flying ace credited with six aerial victories. In 1927, he disappeared while attempting the first non-stop east–west flight across the Atlantic Ocean. His Fokker F.VIIa, named St. Raphael, was last seen over the mid-Atlantic by oil tanker SS Josiah Macy.

== World War I service ==
Hamilton was commissioned into the Corps of Royal Engineers as a second lieutenant on 12 June 1916. He was promoted to lieutenant on 12 December 1917, and having transferred to the Royal Flying Corps to train as a pilot, was appointed a flying officer on 17 January 1918.

Hamilton was posted to No. 17 Squadron stationed in Salonika, Greece, flying a SE.5a. His first victory was on 21 April and was shared with fellow ace Acheson Goulding. After No. 17 Squadron was merged with No. 47 Squadron to form No. 150 Squadron, Hamilton scored five more wins. The four triumphs he notched between 4 May and 4 September were shared with other aces, such as Gerald Gibbs, Frederick Travers, and Gerald Gordon Bell. Hamilton's sixth and last win, on 18 September 1918, was a solo one.

He was subsequently awarded the Distinguished Flying Cross, which was gazetted in February 1919. His citation read:

Lieutenant Leslie Hamilton. (Salonika)

A gallant and skilful scout pilot who never hesitates to attack enemy formations, however superior in numbers. During recent operations he has rendered exceptional service. He has himself brought down, or assisted to bring down, six enemy machines.

== Post war RAF career ==
Hamilton was granted a short-service commission in the RAF on 24 October 1919, but relinquished both his temporary and short service commissions at his own request on 28 November, and was transferred to unemployed list. However, he soon returned to RAF service, being granted another short service commission on 14 July 1920 with the rank of flying officer.

On 2 July 1921 he married Barbara Webber of Maidenhead, Berkshire.

In 1922 he was serving in No. 24 Squadron, based at Kenley, and in June he took part in the 3rd RAF Aerial Pageant at Hendon Aerodrome, coming second in a race between Avro 504s, and with the rest his squadron giving a demonstration of formation flying in Bristol Fighters. In September the same year he took part in the first King's Cup Race, flying an Airco DH.9C belonging to Lady Anne Savile (Princess Loewenstein-Wertheim), who flew with him as a passenger. They came sixth.

In the June 1923 King's Birthday Honours he was made a Member of the Order of the British Empire. In July he took part in the Fourth RAF Aerial Pageant, again taking part in the Avro 504 race, and again coming second. He was granted a permanent commission in the RAF on 5 September.

In July 1924 he took part on the Fifth RAF Aerial Pageant, as part of team representing Kenley in an aerial relay race. Each team consisted of an Avro 504, a Bristol Fighter and a Sopwith Snipe, with Hamilton flying the Avro in the winning team. No. 24 Squadron mounted another Aerial Pageant at Kenley in a week later organised by the Air Ministry and the Empire Press Union for the benefit of 170 members of the Canadian Weekly Newspaper Association. Hamilton, flying an Avro 504, gave a demonstration of stunt flying. Hamilton was posted to the Inland Area Aircraft Depot at Henlow on 17 September 1924, and on 3 December was placed on half-pay. He was restored to full pay on 15 September 1925, only to resign his commission for good on 19 September.

== Commercial career ==
Hamilton acquired a Martinsyde F.6 (G-EBDK) from F. P. Raynham, and on 29 January 1925 he flew from London to St. Moritz, Switzerland, via Paris, Zurich, and Chur, a total distance of 450 miles, being airborne for eight hours. In August he competed in two events at the Royal Aero Club Meeting at Lympne Aerodrome, Kent.

Hamilton, along with Geoffrey de Havilland, Hubert Broad and others, was a founder member of the British Private Aircraft Owners' Club on 17 February 1926. During the General Strike in May Hamilton was one of the pilots taking part a scheme organised by the Royal Aero Club to deliver newspapers by air. Hamilton also entered the 1926 King's Cup Race, but was obliged to withdraw as his engine was not ready in time.

In 1926–27 Hamilton operated a private flying taxi service in Switzerland and the South of France flying a Vickers Viking IV amphibious aircraft (G-EBED). (A replica of G-EBED can be seen at Brooklands Museum.)

== Atlantic flight and disappearance ==
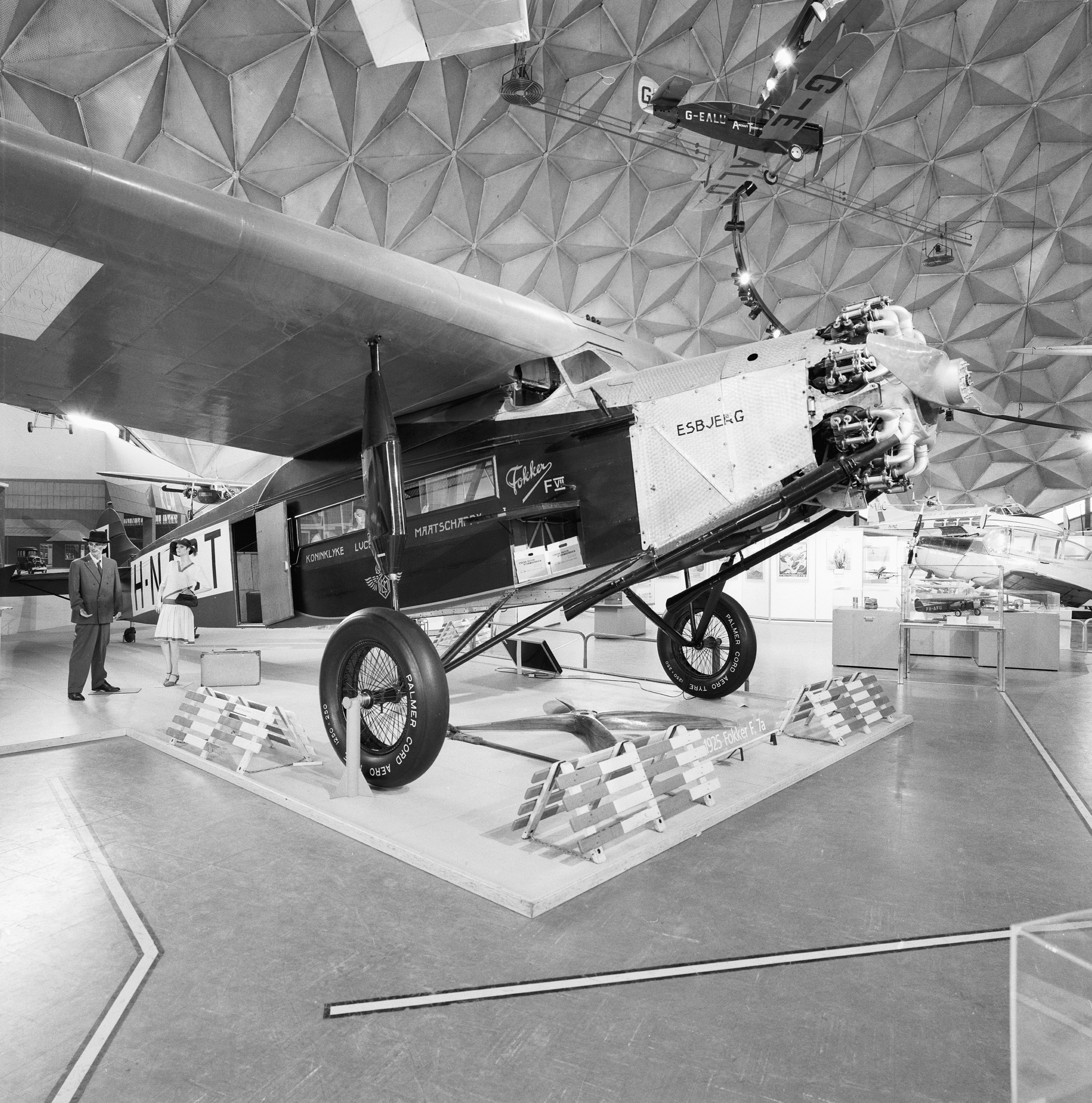
A Fokker VIIa, similar to St. Raphael

Hamilton was then involved in an attempt to make the first flight across the Atlantic from east to west, flying from England to Ottawa, Ontario, Canada. Princess Lowenstein-Wertheim, a widowed aircraft enthusiast, provided the finance and the aircraft, a Fokker F.VIIa (G-EBTQ) fitted with a 500 hp Bristol Jupiter engine, and named St. Raphael. The aircraft, flown by Hamilton and Frederick F. Minchin from Imperial Airways, with Princess Lowenstein-Wertheim as passenger, took off from Upavon Aerodrome, Wiltshire, on 31 August 1927 at 7:15 a.m. They flew along the south coast of Wales, across to Ireland, making their departure over the Aran Islands. The last confirmed sighting was made by the oil tanker SS Josiah Macy at 9:44 p.m. in the mid-Atlantic. Around 6 a.m. the next morning the Dutch steamer SS Blijdendijik reported seeing a white light travelling eastward in the sky when about 420 miles east-south-east of New York, which, if it were St. Raphael, was far to the south of its intended route, suggesting that they were lost. The aircraft was never seen again.

== See also ==
- List of missing aircraft
- List of people who disappeared mysteriously at sea
