= Air liaison officer =

Military role linking an air force with another organization

An air liaison officer is generally an air force official acting as an intermediary between the air force they represent and another organization, although this role can vary based on country.

== United Kingdom ==
In World War II, air liaison officers were senior officers of the Royal Air Force posted within a separate foreign or domestic military or civil service, providing communication between that service and the Royal Air Force.

=== Some Air Liaison Officers ===
- Squadron Leader William Palstra (killed on R101)
- Air Vice Marshal Stanley James (Jimmy) Goble
- Air Vice Marshal David Vaughan Carnegie
- Wing Commander Hugh Gordon Malcolm VC
- Field Marshal Sir Francis Wogan Festing
- Air Vice Marshal Henry Meyrick Cave-Browne-Cave
- Air Vice Marshal Henry Neilson Wrigley

== See also ==
- Liaison officer
