= Dagoberto Godoy =

Chilean pilot

Dagoberto Godoy Fuentealba
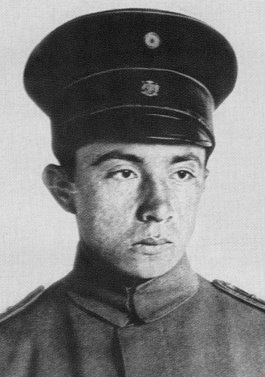
- Godoy in 1918
- Born: 22 July 1893; Temuco, Chile
- Died: 8 September 1960 (aged 67); Santiago, Chile
- Military career
- Allegiance: Chile
- Branch: Chilean Army
- Service years: 1915–1924
- Rank: Capitan

Dagoberto Godoy Fuentealba (22 July 1893 – 8 September 1960) was a Chilean military pilot and the first person to fly over the Andes.

== Biography ==
Godoy was born in Temuco, the son of Abraham Godoy and Clotilde Fuentealba. He was orphaned at the age of two and was raised by his maternal aunt Petronila y Tránsito Fuentealba.

He entered the Libertador Bernardo O'Higgins Military Academy in 1910, destined for a posting in the Batallón de Ferrocarrileros ("Railway Battalion") of the Army Engineers. In 1915 he requested a transfer to the Servicio de Aviación Militar de Chile ("Military Aviation Service of Chile"), and spent a year at the School of Military Aeronautics before graduating, and being promoted to lieutenant on 12 February 1916. He took part in several international competitions in 1916, winning the President of the Republic Prize, and coming second in a race held in Buenos Aires.

In mid-1918 Chile received twelve Bristol M.1c aircraft from Britain. Major Victor Huston, a British flying ace, also arrived to assist in training the Chileans. In December Godoy, encouraged by Huston, obtained permission of the head of air service, Pedro Dartnell, to attempt a crossing the Andes, taking advantage of the Bristol's superior performance to any aircraft they previously had.

On 12 December 1918, flying Bristol M.1c C4988, Godoy took off from the airfield of El Bosque, and flew past Tupungato, through the mountain passes of Cristo Redentor and Uspallata, passing close to the summit of Aconcagua, before landing in a field in Lagunitas, close to Mendoza, Argentina. He crashed into a fence, damaging his landing gear, propeller and starboard wing, and hitting his head on the dashboard, receiving a slight concussion. The flight had lasted 90 minutes at a speed of 180–190 kilometres per hour (110–120 mph), at a maximum altitude of 6,300 metres (20,700 ft), and was made in an open-cockpit aircraft without heating or oxygen. Godoy eventually returned to Chile to public acclaim, and was promoted to captain. His feat encouraged others, with Lieutenant Armando Cortinez Mújica flying another Bristol to Argentina and back on 5 April 1919, and the same year Sergeant Jose del Carmen Ojeda established the first South American altitude record of 7,188 metres (23,583 ft).

Godoy left the army on 15 July 1924, and married Ernestina Lisbon Uribe the following year, with whom he had six children. In 1930 the Chilean Air Force was created as an independent branch, and in 1936, Godoy was granted the honorary rank of Capitán de Bandada. In 1952 Godoy was promoted to the honorary rank of Comandante de Grupo, and to General de Brigada Aérea in 1957.

Godoy died in Santiago de Chile on 8 September 1960.
