= Bristol M.1 =

British fighter plane of the First World War

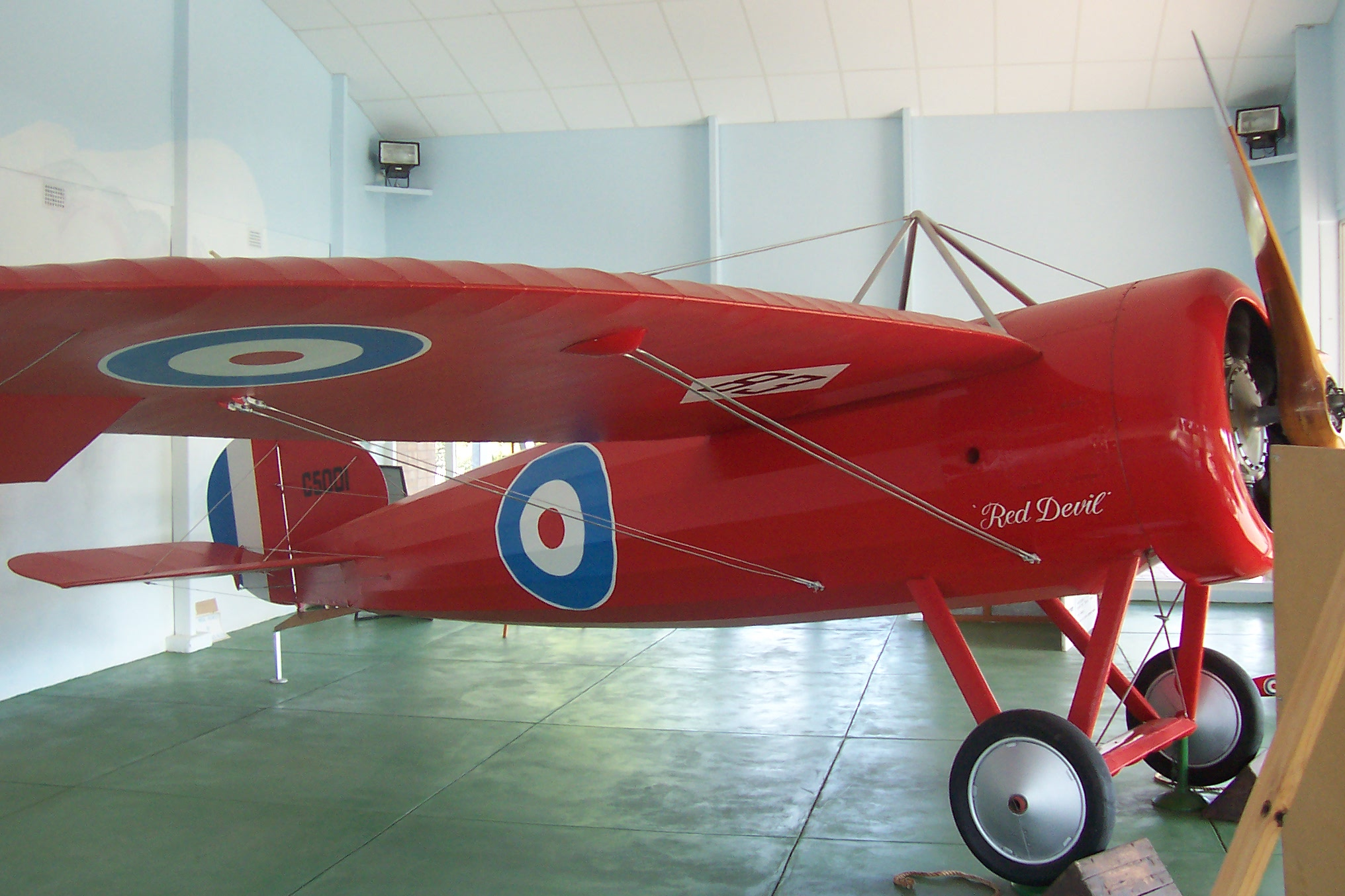
- The only surviving Bristol monoplane, on display at Minlaton, South Australia, 2005

General information
- Type: Fighter
- Manufacturer: Bristol Aeroplane Company
- Designer: Frank Barnwell
- Status: Out of service
- Primary users: Royal Flying Corps Chilean Air Force; Royal Air Force
- Number built: 130

History
- Introduction date: 1917
- First flight: 14 July 1916

The Bristol M.1 Monoplane Scout is a British monoplane fighter of the First World War. It holds the distinction of being the only British monoplane fighter to reach production during the conflict.

During mid-1916, work commenced at Bristol on a new fighter aircraft as a private venture, headed by aeronautical engineer Frank Barnwell. The design was more radical than contemporary aircraft such as Airco's DH.5, which had a backward staggered biplane configuration. It featured a carefully streamlined circular cross-section fuselage built using conventional wood and fabric construction techniques to minimise manufacturing difficulty. On 14 July 1916, the first prototype, designated as the M.1A, conducted its maiden flight, flown by F.P. Raynham. During testing, the type quickly demonstrated its capabilities as a high speed aircraft for the era, possessing a maximum speed that was some 30–50 mph (48–80 km/h) higher than any of the contemporary German Fokker Eindecker and French Morane-Saulnier N monoplanes.

Despite its promise, only 130 aircraft were constructed. This was largely due to an institutional mistrust of the monoplane platform held by the British War Office and many pilots of the Royal Flying Corps (RFC) at that time, believing it to be accident-prone and inferior to the more common biplane configuration used by many of the M.1's contemporaries. As a consequence of the type being believed to possess too great a landing speed to be safely handled by the constrained French airfields on the Western Front, the M.1 was commonly deployed to the Middle East and the Balkans theatres instead. A single ace pilot, Captain Frederick Dudley Travers DFC of No. 150 Squadron RAF, flew the type, having successfully shot down several opponents. During December 1918, Lt. Dagoberto Godoy of the Servicio de Aviación Militar de Chile, flew from Santiago to Mendoza, Argentina, a feat which was recorded as being the first flight conducted across the Andes mountain chain.

== Development ==
=== Origins ===
During the First World War, rapid advances in the field of aeroplanes were being made amongst the participating nations, each side aiming to acquire an advantage over the enemy. In the summer of 1916, British aeronautical engineer Frank Barnwell, the chief designer of the Bristol Aeroplane Company, realising the performance of existing fighter aircraft to be inadequate, set about designing a new fighter aircraft as a private venture. For experimental purposes, several Bristol Scout D aircraft were outfitted 110 horsepower (82 kW) Clerget rotary engine and large-diameter propellers. Considered to be a success, Barnwell decided to incorporate these features into his emerging design.

According to aviation author J.M. Bruce, Barnwell's project was broadly similar to a parallel programme by rival British aircraft manufacturer Airco, which would ultimately produce the DH.5. The Bristol aircraft was considered to be more radical and the superior of the two fighters. Specifically, Barnwell had exerted great efforts to produce the aerodynamically cleanest aircraft possible, save for compromises that were made to better facilitate both construction and maintenance activities. Accordingly, he selected a monoplane configuration for the type. Bruce declared this to be a "bold conception" due to the British War Office having effectively banned monoplanes from military service following several accidents.

During July 1916, the first example of the type, which received the designation of Bristol M.1, was rolled out at the company's Bristol facility. It was basically a single-seat tractor monoplane fighter. On 14 July 1916, the first prototype, designated as the M.1A, conducted its maiden flight, flown by F.P. Raynham. Reportedly, the aircraft showed its aptitude for high-speed flight during this initial flight, reaching a speed of 132 mph.

=== Test programme ===
Shortly following its maiden flight, the first prototype was purchased by the War Office for evaluation purposes. During late July 1916, the M.1A was dispatched to the Central Flying School (CFS) in Upavon, Wiltshire where it underwent testing. During official test flights, the M.1A demonstrated its impressive performance, being recorded as having attained a peak speed of 128 miles per hour (206 km/h) as well as the ability to ascend up to 10,000 feet (3,000 m) in 8 minutes 30 seconds. In addition, its stability was found to be positive, particularly its lateral handling, and the type to possess a "moderate difficult of landing".

However, some negative feedback was also gathered from the test pilots, which included criticism over the limited forward and downward view, it being relatively tiring to fly, and being nose-heavy when flown without the engine running. It was observed by the CFS that it had made no effort to establish the M.1A's maximum speed at ground level, noting that propeller had been designed to deliver peak performance when flown at altitude. In addition to the flight test programme, the prototype was also subject to static loading tests during August 1916, during which no sign of structural failure was found.

Having been suitably impressed by the sole prototype's performance, during October 1916, the War Office issued contract No. 87/A/761 to Bristol, ordering a batch of four modified aircraft, which were designated as M.1B, for further testing. The M.1A would also be rebuilt to the improved standard. The M.1B differed from the first prototype in several areas, possessing a more conventional cabane arrangement, consisting of a pyramid of four straight steel struts, along with a large clear-view cut-out panel in the starboard wing root to provide for an improved view during landing, and being armed with a single .303 in (7.7 mm) Vickers machine gun, which was mounted on the port wing root. On 15 December 1916, the first M.1B was delivered to the CFS.

=== Rejection and limited production ===
Throughout the development of the M.1, there was little importance placed upon the programme by the War Office. According to Bruce, the organisation appeared to be in no rush to decide its fate. The aircraft had demonstrated excellent performance during testing, possessing a maximum speed that was some 30–50 mph (48–80 km/h) higher than any of the contemporary German Fokker Eindecker and French Morane-Saulnier N monoplanes. In addition to its aerial performance, ground-based structural tests had also produced very strong results. Bruce has also stated that production aircraft would have been available in advance of several of the iconic high-performance British fighters of the conflict, such as the Royal Aircraft Factory S.E.5 and the Sopwith Camel. However, the War Office continued to draw out its verdict for some time, preferring to opt for extensive trials and operational evaluations instead.

Ultimately, the M.1 was rejected by the Air Ministry for service on the Western Front, ostensibly because its landing speed of 49 mph was considered too high for small French airfields, however, comparative trials between the M.1A, the Airco DH.2, and the Royal Aircraft Factory B.E.12 found them to have similar landing distances, while the landing speeds of both biplanes were only 5 mph slower. Bruce has speculated that a prejudice against monoplanes and a great distaste for the cockpit's limited downward view. had played a heavy role in its fate. This negative viewpoint was not universal as, according to Bruce, stories of the M.1's speed and manoeuvrability had quickly spread to front-line pilots, even to the point of enthusiastic rumours surrounding the type.

Some authors have made claims that the probable reason for the M.1 having been rejected came as a consequence of a widespread belief held at that time that monoplane aircraft were inherently unsafe during combat. The Royal Flying Corps (RFC) had imposed a service-wide ban on monoplanes after the crash of one of the Bristol-Coanda Monoplanes on 10 September 1912, and despite the subsequent 1913 Monoplane Committee having cleared the design type, there persisted a deep-rooted suspicion of monoplanes amongst pilots. This suspicion may also have been reinforced by the RFC's underwhelming experience with various Morane-Saulnier monoplanes, especially the Morane-Saulnier N, which had also been openly criticised for possessing a relatively high landing speed in comparison to biplanes. During this era, biplane configurations were normally stronger, being able to apply traditional calculations used in bridge construction by civil engineers to their design, and being easier to brace than monoplanes.

Nevertheless, on 3 August 1917, a production order for 125 aircraft was placed by the War Office. These aircraft, which were designated as the M.1C, were powered by a single 110 hp Le Rhône 9J rotary engine and were armed with a single Vickers machine gun, which was centrally mounted directly in front of the pilot. Of these, a single M.1, registered G-EAVP was rebuilt as a high-speed testbed for the Bristol Lucifer three-cylinder radial engine. This aircraft was designated the M.1D.

== Design ==
The Bristol M.1 was a single-seat tractor monoplane. It was powered by a single Clerget rotary engine, capable of generating up to 110 horsepower (82 kW), which drove a relatively large twin-bladed propeller that was in turn furnished with a bulky hemispherical spinner for the purpose of reducing drag. The M.1 possessed a carefully streamlined circular cross-section fuselage, which featured conventional wood and fabric construction techniques to minimise manufacturing difficulty. The exterior of the aircraft, which was covered in fabric, was fully faired; this was a contributing factor to the type being referred by Bruce as "one of the simplest and cleanest aircraft of its day".

The M.1 was furnished with a shoulder-mounted wing that was attached to the upper longerons of the airframe. It was braced with flying wires which ran between the wing and the lower fuselage, as well as landing wires from the wings to a cabane comprising a pair of semi-circular steel tube hoops that were positioned over the pilot's cockpit; this was shaped in order to better facilitate the pilot's ingress and egress to their position in the cockpit. The wing possessed a wide semi-elliptical rearwards sweep at the tip, which meant that the front spar was considerably shorter than the rear and there being no inter-spar bracing being the end of the forward spar. To increase the downward vision available to the pilot, a sizable inter-spar cutout was present in the starboard wing root.

== Operational history ==
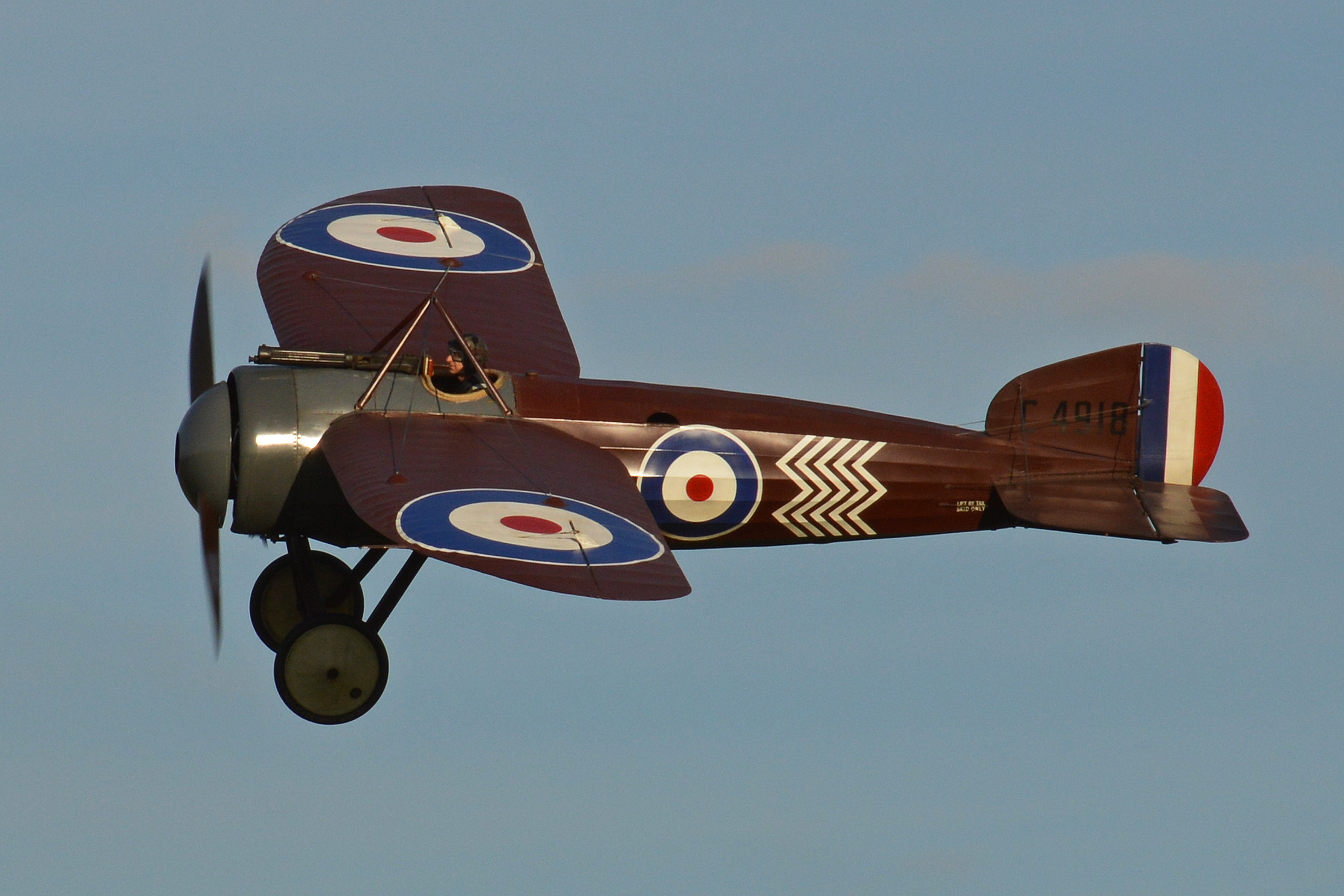
The Shuttleworth Collection's reproduction Bristol M.1C (G-BWJM), 2013

It is believed that a total of 33 M.1Cs were deployed to the Middle East and the Balkans during 1917–18, while the remainder were predominantly assigned to numerous training units based across the British mainland. Reportedly, the type found a level of popularity as the personal mounts for various senior officers of the RFC. A single M.1C was also dispatched to France during 1917, although this is believed to have been for evaluation purposes only. Bruce claimed that there was a climate of official reluctance to deploy the M.1C, leading to the fighter being denied various opportunities to participate in operations.

According to the official historical account of No. 111 Squadron, the deployment of the M.1 to the Palestine theatre proved to frequently impinge upon the operations of enemy aerial reconnaissance operations, forcing them to typically operate from high altitudes. However, it is also noted that they had lacked the endurance necessary to conduct escort missions to support friendly long-range reconnaissance aircraft. The type was heavily used to perform ground attack missions against Turkish forces in the region. According to Bruce, the central spinner would often be removed when operating in hot conditions in order to better dissipate excessively high engine temperatures.

Perhaps the most successful M.1C pilot amongst those that served on the Macedonian front was Captain Frederick Dudley Travers DFC of No. 150 Squadron RAF, who became the only ace on this type. Travers switched from the Royal Aircraft Factory SE.5a, in which he had scored three of his four kills, and scored the last five of his victories between 2 and 16 September 1918, possibly all in the same M.1C, serial number C4976. One of his victims was a Fokker D.VII, widely regarded as the best German fighter of its day.

During the second half of 1918, a batch of 12 M.1Cs were delivered to Chile to serve as part-payment for the battleships Almirante Latorre and Almirante Cochrane, which had been constructed for Chile in Britain but commandeered for use by the Royal Navy prior to their completion. One of these fighters, flown by Lt. Dagoberto Godoy, was used to fly from Santiago to Mendoza, Argentina and back on 12 December 1918, which was recorded as being the first flight to be made across the Andes mountain chain.

Following the signing of the Armistice of 11 November 1918, which effectively ended hostilities, a number of former military M.1s were resold into civilian service. In this capacity, the type was frequently used as a sporting and racing aircraft. The sole Lucifer-engined M.1D, painted red and registered G-EAVP, was successfully raced during 1922, winning the handicap prize in the 1922 Aerial Derby, piloted by L.L. Carter. The next year, it was fitted with a specially tuned 140 hp (100 kW) Lucifer engine and was entered for the Grosvenor Cup: however, the aircraft was lost following a crash at Chertsey, Surrey, on approach to Croydon Airport, resulting in the death of the pilot, Ernest Leslie Foot.

== Variants ==
M.1A
Single prototype with 110 hp (82 kW) Clerget 9Z rotary engine.

M.1B
Four evaluation models, variously powered by 110 hp (82 kW) Clerget 9Z, 130 hp (97 kW) Clerget 9B or 150 hp (110 kW) Admiralty Rotary A.R.1.

M.1C
Series production model, 125 built, powered by 110 hp (82 kW) Le Rhône 9Ja engines.

M.1D
Single M.1C rebuilt as a testbed for the 140 hp (100 kW) Bristol Lucifer engine.

== Operators ==
Chile

- Chilean Air Force

United Kingdom

- Royal Flying Corps / Royal Air Force
  - No. 14 Squadron RAF
  - No. 47 Squadron RAF
  - No. 72 Squadron RAF
  - No. 111 Squadron RAF
  - No. 150 Squadron RAF

== Surviving aircraft ==
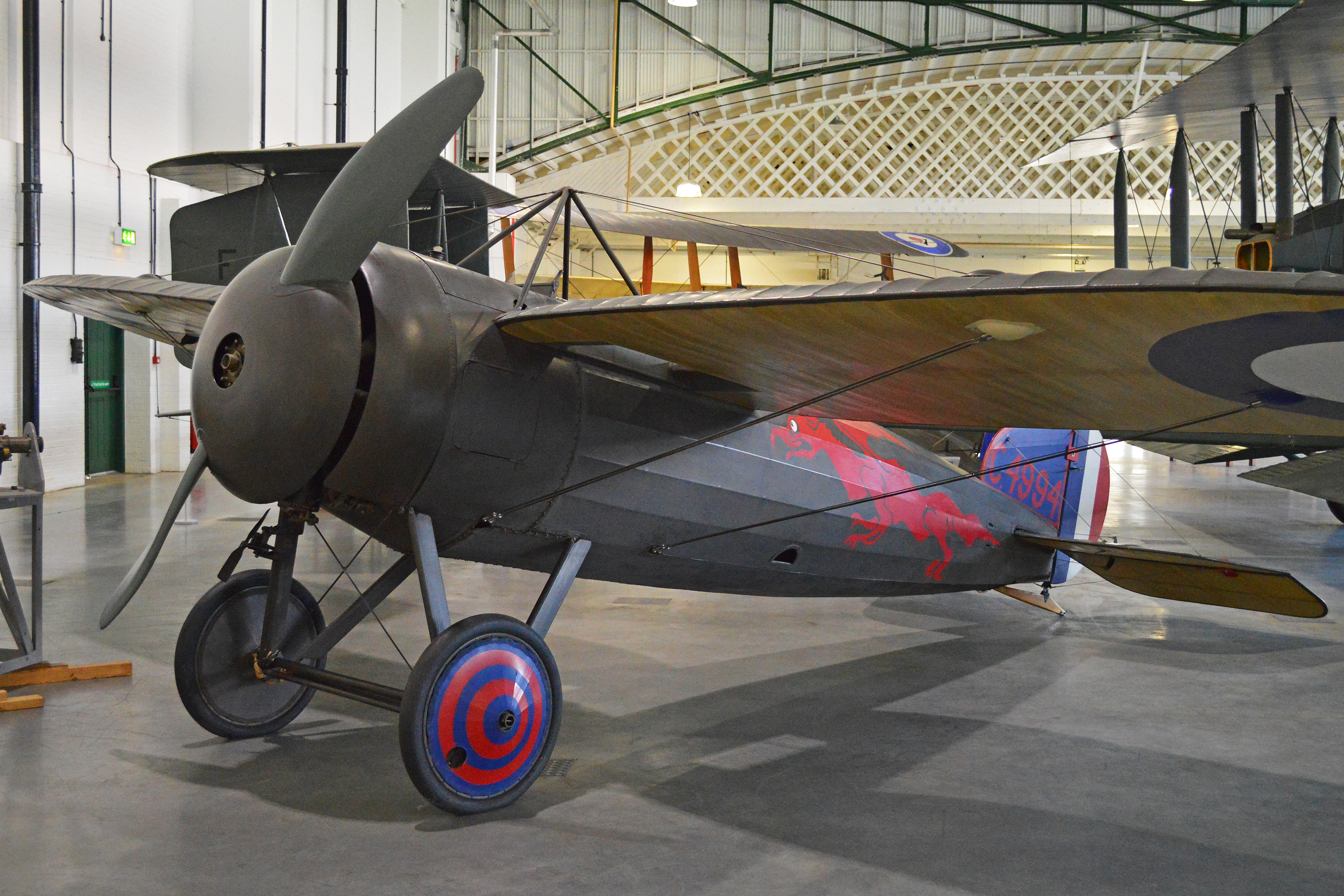
The Royal Air Force Museum's replica Bristol M.1C (G-BLWM)

- One remaining original Bristol M.1 survives and is preserved at the Harry Butler Memorial, Minlaton, South Australia. This is the former RAF aircraft C5001, which was brought to Australia in 1921 by Captain Harry Butler and flown by him under the Australian civil registration VH-UQI. He used the aircraft to complete the first over-water flight in the Southern Hemisphere.
- The Royal Air Force Museum Cosford has on display a formerly airworthy replica aircraft with the identity C4994.
- The Shuttleworth Collection at Old Warden in the UK maintains and operates a replica M1C C4918 (G-BWJM) to airworthy condition, built by members of the Northern Aeroplane Workshops, delivered to the Collection in October 1997. It is powered by an original Le Rhône 110 HP rotary engine, and the aircraft can be seen flying at home air displays during the summer months.
- Museo Nacional Aeronáutico y del Espacio at Los Cerrillos, Santiago de Chile has two replicas in its collection. The first one (intended to be airworthy) was built in UK bu AJD engineering in 1989, being flown just a couple of times (FIDAE'90), since then being preserved inside the main building of Museo with part of its fabric cover removed, showing its airframe. The other one was locally built, receiving the RAF serial number C4988, the monoplane flown by Dagoberto Godoy over the Andes in 1918. It is used for displays on different aviation events.

== Specifications (M.1C) ==
Data from Encyclopedia of Military Aircraft, The Bristol M.1

General characteristics

- Crew: 1
- Length: 20 ft 5 in (6.22 m)
- Wingspan: 30 ft 9 in (9.37 m)
- Height: 7 ft 9 in (2.36 m)
- Wing area: 145 sq ft (13.5 m^{2})
- Empty weight: 900 lb (408 kg)
- Gross weight: 1,348 lb (611 kg)
- Powerplant: 1 × Le Rhône 9J 9-cylinder air-cooled rotary piston engine, 110 hp (82 kW)
- Propellers: 2-bladed fixed-pitch propeller

Performance

- Maximum speed: 130 mph (210 km/h, 110 kn) at sea level
- Range: 226 mi (364 km, 196 nmi)
- Endurance: 1 hour 45 minutes
- Service ceiling: 20,000 ft (6,100 m)
- Power/mass: 0.08 hp/lb (0.13 kW/kg)

Armament

- Guns: 1x fixed-forward .303 in (7.7 mm) Vickers machine gun

== See also ==
Related lists

- List of aircraft of the Royal Air Force
- List of aircraft of the Royal Flying Corps
- List of fighter aircraft
