= No. 18 Squadron RAF =

Flying squadron of the Royal Air Force

- Squadron badge
- Active: 1915–1918 (RFC); 1918–1919; 1931–1946; 1953–1957; 1958–1963; 1964–1980; 1981–present
- Country: United Kingdom
- Branch: Royal Air Force
- Type: Flying squadron
- Role: Helicopter heavy-lift support
- Part of: Joint Aviation Command
- Station: RAF Odiham
- Mottos: Animo et fide (Latin for 'With courage and faith')
- Aircraft: Boeing Chinook HC5, HC6 and HC6A

Number 18 Squadron of the Royal Air Force (also known as No. 18 'Burma' Squadron) operates the Boeing Chinook from RAF Odiham. Owing to its heritage as a bomber squadron, it is also known as No. 18 (B) Squadron.

Formed in 1915 as a fighter squadron, it also operated early bomber types. After reforming in 1931 it again operated a variety of biplane bombers before seeing action during the Second World War on a number of fronts with the Bristol Blenheim. Reformed again in 1953, it went on to operate jet bombers such as the English Electric Canberra and Vickers Valiant. In 1964, it started flying helicopters, firstly the Westland Wessex and from 1981 the Boeing Chinook heavy-lift helicopter.

== History ==
=== First World War (1915–1919) ===
The squadron was formed on 11 May 1915 at RAF Northolt in London as part of the Royal Flying Corps. It arrived in France on 19 November 1915, principally equipped with the Vickers F.B.5 Gunbus, supplemented by the Airco DH.2 and Bristol Scout, and operating in the army cooperation role.

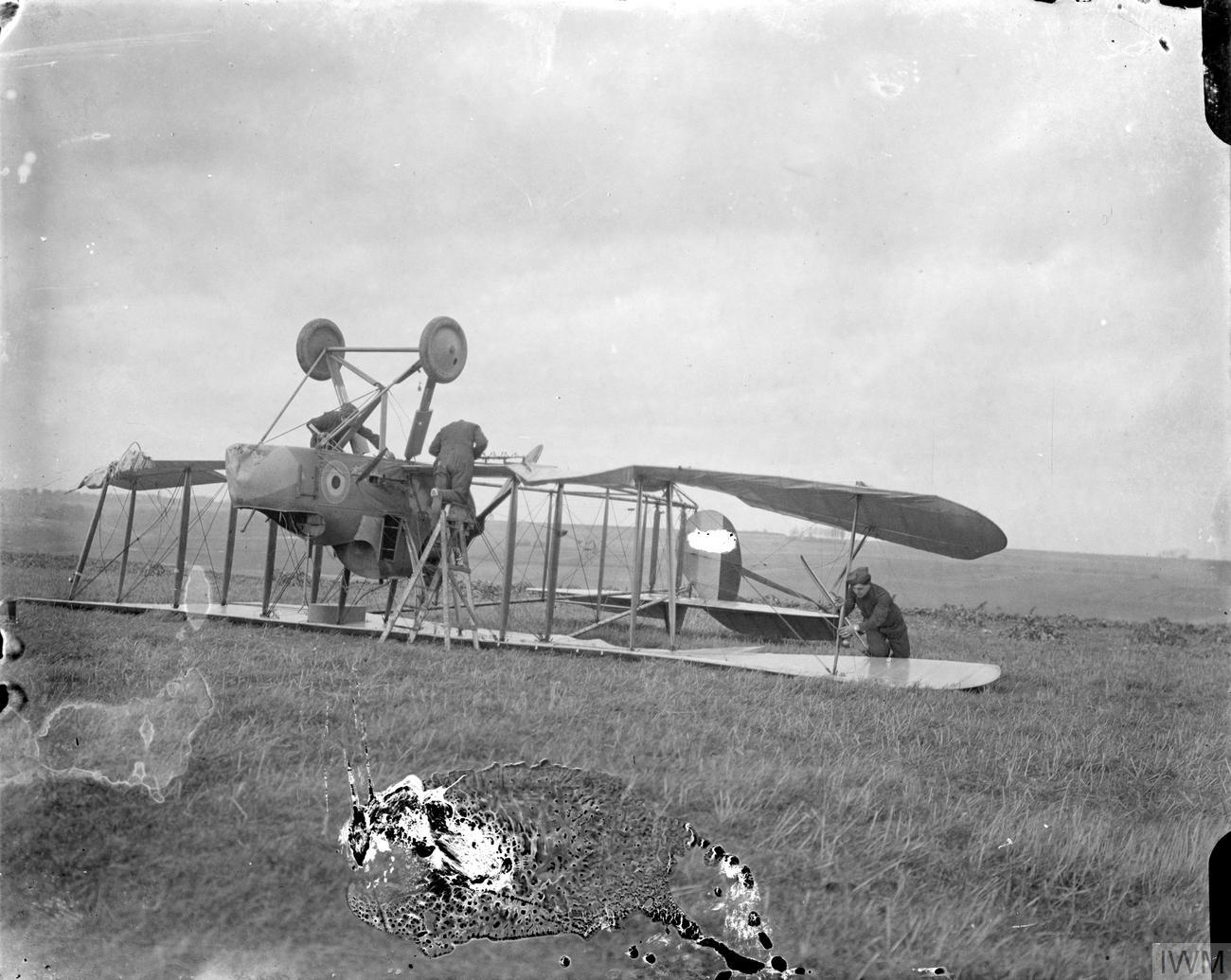
A No. 18 Squadron Royal Aircraft Factory F.E.2b, overturned by the wind at Lovieville in France during November 1916

By April 1916, the squadron had re-equipped with the Royal Aircraft Factory F.E.2b, in which Victor Huston became a flying ace. The squadron was heavily deployed during the Battle of the Somme, where it was attached to the Cavalry Corps and trained to assist it in the event on any breakthrough, (Note: This association later resulted in the Squadron adopting the winged horse Pegasus as part of its badge.) but towards the end of the year and into early 1917, was increasingly deployed on night operations as the F.E.2b became more vulnerable during daylight operations.

The squadron re-equipped with the Airco DH.4 from June 1917, although operations continued with the F.E.2 until at least August 1917 as the DH.4 was equipped with the unreliable RAF 3 engine. Once these reliability problems were solved, the squadron, began to specialise in long-range attacks, but this changed in March 1918 when the Germans launched Operation Michael, the opening move of their Spring Offensive. No. 18 Squadron was among many units deployed to stop the German attacks, resorting to low level raids as well as more conventional medium level operations. As the Germans switched the focus of their operations northwards in the Battle of the Lys, the squadron was again heavily involved, and on 12 April, the squadron carried out six separate attacks in the vicinity of Merville in France, with thirteen pilots flying between them 44 flying hours that day. In September 1918, the squadron began to re-equip with the Airco DH.9A, this process continuing until November that year. By the end of the war, the squadron had claimed 200 air-to-air victories. Flight Lieutenant David Stewart, who had shot down two aircraft as an observer flying with No. 20 Squadron, was credited with fourteen more as a pilot flying with No. 18 Squadron. Following the Armistice of 11 November 1918 that ended the fighting on the Western Front, the squadron moved into Germany in support of the Occupation of the Rhineland in early 1919, carrying mail between the British Army of the Rhine and the United Kingdom. The squadron returned to Britain in September 1919 and disbanded at Weston-on-the-Green in Oxfordshire on 31 December 1919.

=== Interwar years (1931–1939) ===
The squadron reformed at RAF Upper Heyford in Oxfordshire on 20 October 1931, equipped with the Hawker Hart light bomber. As well as training for its main role, the squadron participated in the 1932 and 1935 Hendon Air Shows as well as the Royal Review of the Royal Air Force by King George V at RAF Mildenhall in Suffolk during July 1935. In January 1936, the squadron moved to RAF Bircham Newton in Norfolk, with the squadron's C Flight being detached to form No. 49 Squadron on 10 February. In April 1936, the squadron's Harts were replaced by the improved Hawker Hind derivative. The squadron joined the newly established No. 1 Group in July 1936, and moved back to Upper Heyford in September 1936. No. 18 Squadron transferred to No. 2 Group on 1 January 1939, re-equipping with the Bristol Blenheim Mk.I monoplane twin-engined bomber in May 1939.

=== Second World War (1939–1945) ===
On the outbreak of the Second World War, No. 18 Squadron along with No. 57 Squadron comprised No. 70 Wing and was still based at Upper Heyford equipped with the Blenheim Mk.I. The wing was allocated for deployment to France as part of the British Expeditionary Force Air Component, with the role of strategic reconnaissance. The squadron reached France by the end of September 1939, commencing operations in October and re-equipping with the Blenheim Mk.IV in February 1940. When Germany invaded France and the Low Countries, No. 18 Squadron took part in bombing missions against German troops as well as their envisioned reconnaissance missions. After the squadron was forced to change airfields three times in three days, it was ordered to evacuate back to England on 19 May, moving to RAF Watton in Norfolk. Losses had been heavy, however, with only three Blenheims returning from France.

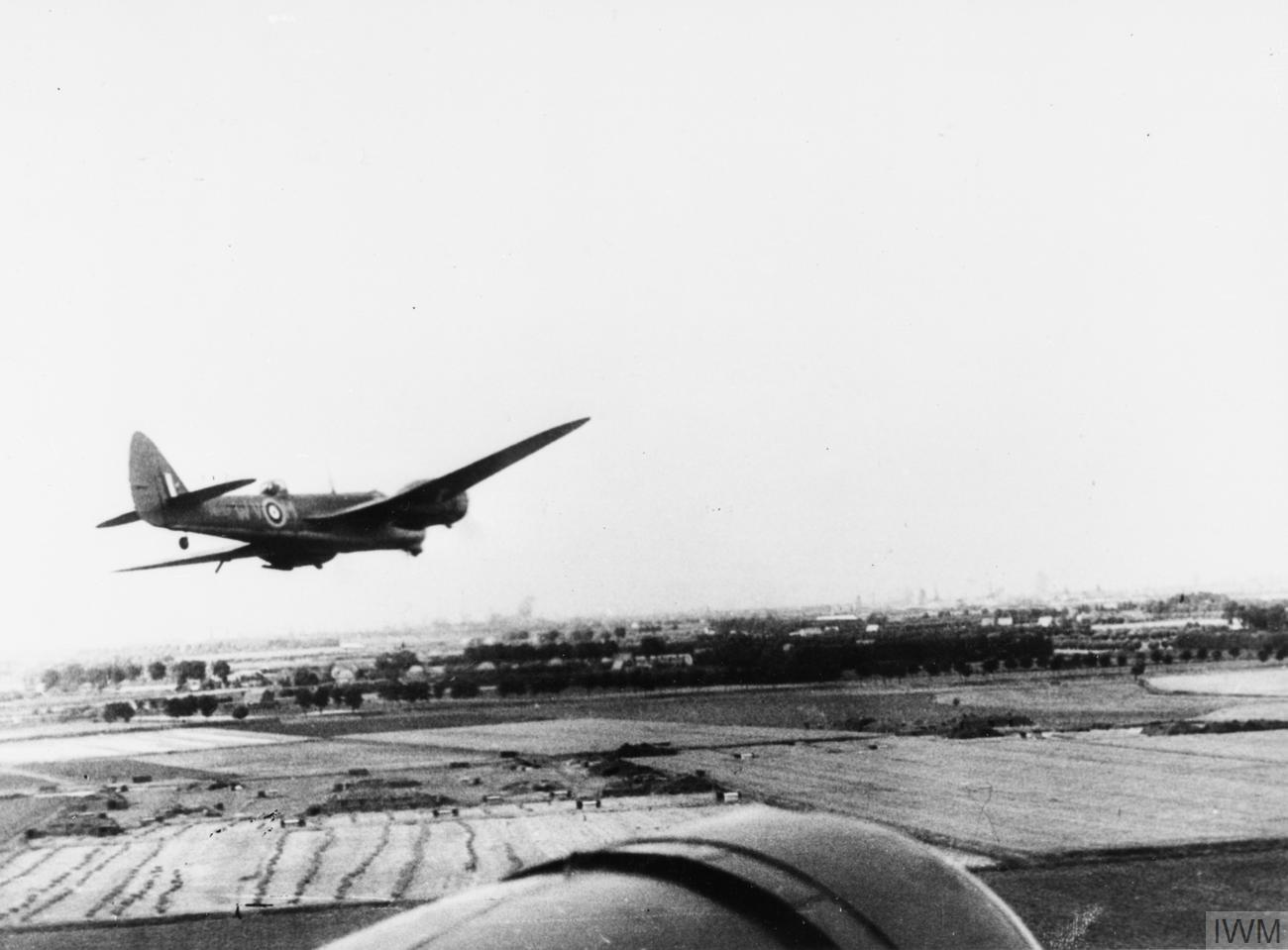
No. 18 Squadron Bristol Blenheims attacking Rotterdam in July 1941

No. 18 Squadron, which had rejoined No. 2 Group, moved to RAF Gatwick in Sussex on 26 May and to RAF West Raynham in Norfolk on 12 June 1940. Operations restarted on 4 July, when three Blenheims (one of which was lost) attacked oil targets in Germany. Operations initially comprised daylight attacks against targets including barges collected for the planned German invasion of Britain, with the squadron suffering heavy losses. It switched to night operations from August that year. It moved to RAF Great Massingham in Norfolk on 8 September, continuing to attack Channel ports, with increased attacks against German airfields from December. On 3 April 1941, the squadron moved to RAF Oulton in Norfolk, with its main duties as daylight anti-shipping duties. It also took part in 'Circus' operations, heavily escorted raids against targets in France to draw German fighters into combat. The squadron moved to RAF Horsham St Faith in Norfolk on 13 July 1941 and to RAF Manston in Kent on 16 August. During one raid over France on 19 August 1941, an aircraft dropped a box over Saint-Omer airfield containing an artificial leg. It was a spare for Wing Commander Douglas Bader.

In October 1941, the squadron's air component (i.e. its aircraft and aircrews) were detached to Malta, while the ground component remained in the UK and was used for maintenance and guard duties. While based at Malta, the squadron's aircraft were used for attacks against targets in Sicily and North Africa, as well as striking against Italian shipping convoys. Losses were heavy, with the two Malta-based Blenheim squadrons, No. 18 and No. 107 Squadron, losing over 57 aircraft during operations from Malta during 1941, including fifteen in December alone. The squadron's strength was supplemented by co-opting Blenheims on transit through Malta to Egypt and their crews as reinforcements. On 4 January 1942, the squadron took part in a large scale attack against Castelvetrano Airfield in Sicily, where reconnaissance had spotted large numbers of transports and bombers. Ten Blenheims from No. 18 Squadron and No. 107 Squadron attacked first, claiming 30 aircraft destroyed and many more damaged, and this was followed up that night by multiple attacks by three Vickers Wellington bombers which claimed a further fourteen aircraft destroyed, at the cost of one Wellington. Actual German and Italian losses consisted of six Savoia-Marchetti SM.82, four CANT Z.1007 Alcione, one Junkers Ju52 and one Fiat CR.42 Falco, with a further 42 aircraft damaged, badly disrupting Axis air transport operations to North Africa. Later that month the surviving aircraft and aircrews of No. 18 Squadron left Malta for the Middle East, and had been absorbed into other units by March 1942.

Back in England, the squadron was rebuilt at RAF Wattisham in Suffolk, with a mixture of new crews from training units and some ex-No.107 Squadron crews returned from Malta, and still equipped with the Blenheim Mk.IV. It remained part of No. 2 Group. Night intruder and army cooperation operations were added to the squadron's duties. On the night of 30 and 31 May 1942, seventeen Blenheims from the squadron carried out intruder attacks against Juvincourt Airfield in northern France, St. Trond Airfield in Belgium and Venlo Airfield in Germany in support of Operation Minellium, the thousand-bomber raid against Cologne. On the night of 1 and 2 June, the squadron again carried out intruder operations in support of a thousand-bomber raid against Essen.

In August 1942, No. 18 Squadron was withdrawn from operations to prepare for deployment to North Africa in support of Operation Torch, and was re-equipped with Blenheim Mk.V bombers (also known as Bisleys). The Blenheim Mk.V carried a heavier defensive armament, but was significantly heavier, and was therefore slower than the aircraft it replaced and had poor engine-out handling characteristics. On 10 October 1942, the squadron's Blenheims flew from Portreath in Cornwall to Blida in Algeria. (Note: The squadron's ground personnel had left Britain on 1 November on the troopship Arundel Castle.) On 17 November 1942, twelve No. 18 Squadron Blenheims set off without fighter escort from Blida to attack Bizerte-Sidi Ahmed airfield in Tunisia, but were attacked by several German Messerschmitt Bf 109 of Jagdgeschwader 51. Two Blenheims were shot down by the German fighters, with two more destroyed after colliding when trying to avoid the fighters, and a fifth was damaged by flak and crash landed at Djidjelli in Algeria. One Bf 109 was shot down by the Blenheims, while several German aircraft were damaged or destroyed on the ground. On 31 November 1942, the squadron moved forwards to Canrobert Airfield, which was closer to the front line, so that it could better support the allied ground forces.

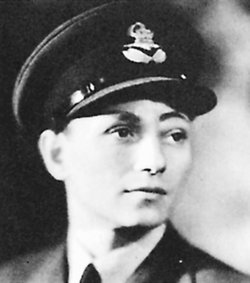
Wing Commander Hugh Malcolm who died during operations in 1942

On the morning of 4 December 1942, six No. 18 Squadron Blenheims attacked an airstrip north of Chouigui, and in the afternoon of the same day, eight No. 18 Squadron Blenheims and two more from No. 614 Squadron took off to repeat the attack, led by Wing Commander Hugh Malcolm, the squadron's commanding officer. No fighter escort was available. One aircraft crash landed due to engine trouble, and as they approached the target area, the formation was attacked by a large numbers of Bf 109s of Jagdgeschwader 51 and Jagdgeschwader 2. Malcolm pressed on with the attack as one by one all of the Blenheims were shot down, with Malcolm the last. Four crews survived, but Malcolm did not and he was posthumously awarded the Victoria Cross.

These losses were quickly replaced, and the squadron was back in action on 27 December 1942, although it was limited to night operations, attacking enemy road transports. On 18 January 1943, the squadron lost another commanding officer when Wing Commander Tucker failed to return from a night intruder mission. The squadron was withdrawn from active service at the beginning of February 1943 to await re-equipment with more modern aircraft, but a German offensive resulted in the squadron being ordered back onto operations with borrowed Blenheims on 18 February. On the night of 28 and 29 March 1943, the squadron flew its last operations with the Blenheim before standing down to re-equip with the Douglas Boston.

The squadron flew its first mission with the Boston on 21 April 1943, when six aircraft bombed enemy troops near Majaz al Bab. It continued operations over North Africa until the end of the Tunisian campaign in May 1943.

Between 1943 and 1945, No. 18 Squadron supported the allied advance through Italy before moving to Greece in September 1945, disbanding there on 31 March 1946.

=== Cold War (1945–1999) ===
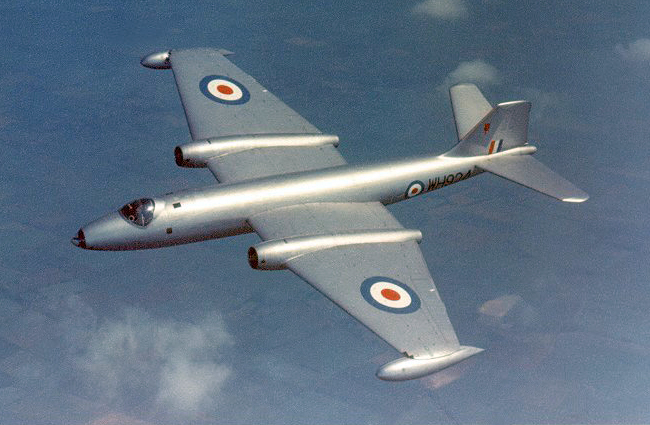
An English Electric Canberra B.2 of the type operated by No. 18 Squadron during the 1950s

No. 18 Squadron was reformed in 1953 at RAF Scampton, Lincolnshire and equipped with the English Electric Canberra B.2 medium bomber before disbanding again on 1 February 1957.

On 15 December 1958, No. 199 Squadron, operating the Canberra and Vickers Valiant in the electronic countermeasures (ECM) role, disbanded, with the Valiant equipped C Flight being redesignated No. 18 Squadron. The squadron's seven Valiants were fitted with an array of powerful jammers to interfere with communications and radar. They were initially employed for training purposes, simulating hostile jamming in Fighter Command exercises (and occasionally inadvertently jamming TV reception over much of the United Kingdom), but later added a bomber support role. The squadron was disbanded on 31 March 1963, as the RAF's Avro Vulcan and Handley Page Victor bombers were now fitted with effective ECM equipment, while the training role could be performed more economically by smaller aircraft such as the Canberra.

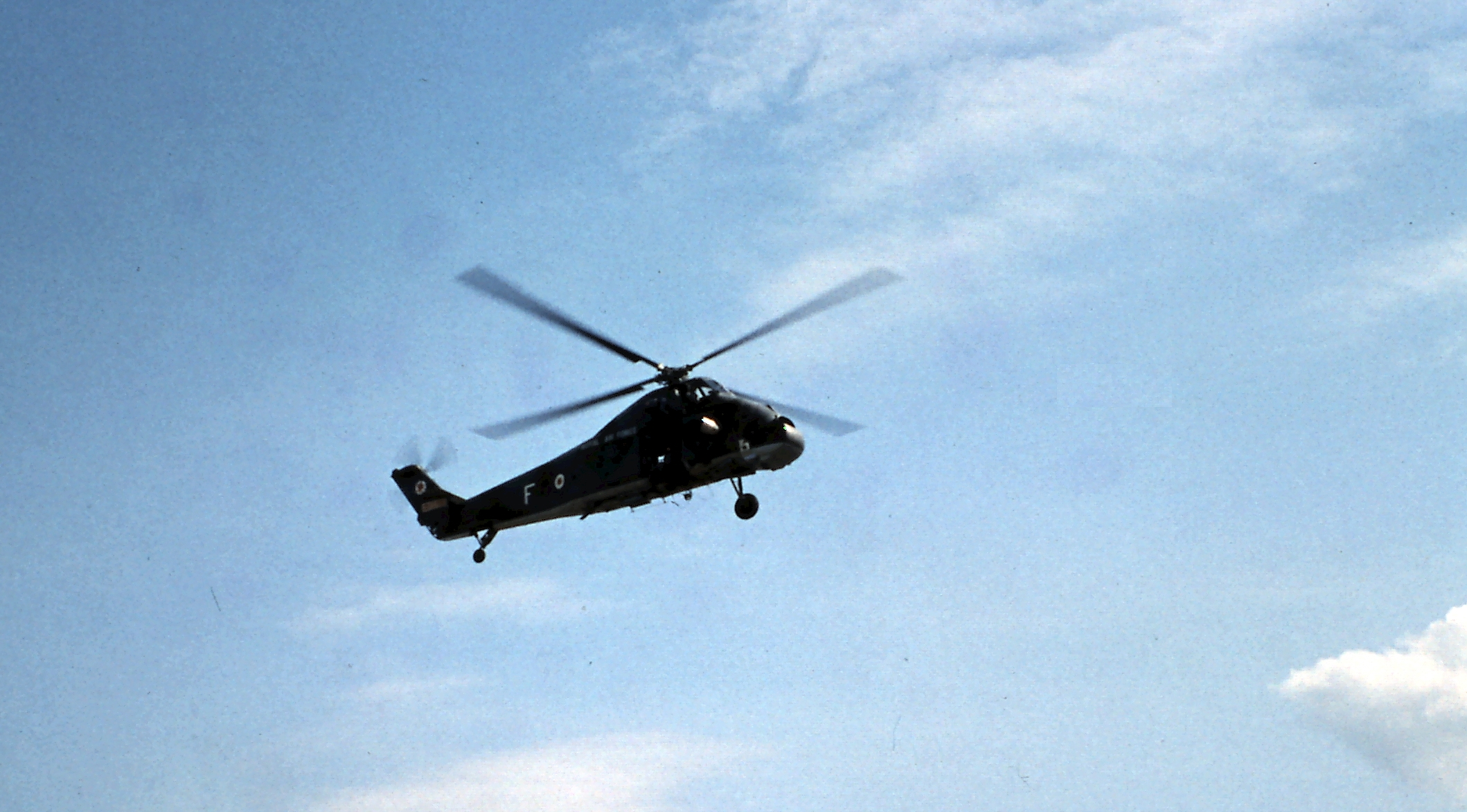
A No. 18 Squadron Westland Wessex HC.2 in 1967

The Squadron was next operational in 1964, equipped with the Westland Wessex HC.2 and based at RAF Odiham in Hampshire, formed when the Wessex Intensive Flying Trials Unit was disbanded and re-designated No. 18 Squadron. The squadron moved to RAF Gütersloh, Westphalia in August 1970 in support of the British Army of the Rhine in Germany, but disbanded again on 20 November 1980. The squadron was reformed on 4 August 1981, becoming the first RAF squadron to fly the Boeing Chinook HC.1. The squadron was the only Chinook squadron that took part in Operation Corporate during the Falklands War in 1982 with four detached and sent south. All were lost, except one, when the ship carrying them, the Atlantic Conveyor was sunk after being hit by an Exocet missile. The remaining aircraft (Bravo November, ZA718) flew almost continuously until the end of the conflict. Squadron Leader Richard "Dick" Langworthy was awarded the Distinguished Flying Cross for his part in the air operations. In August 1983 the squadron returned to Gütersloh.

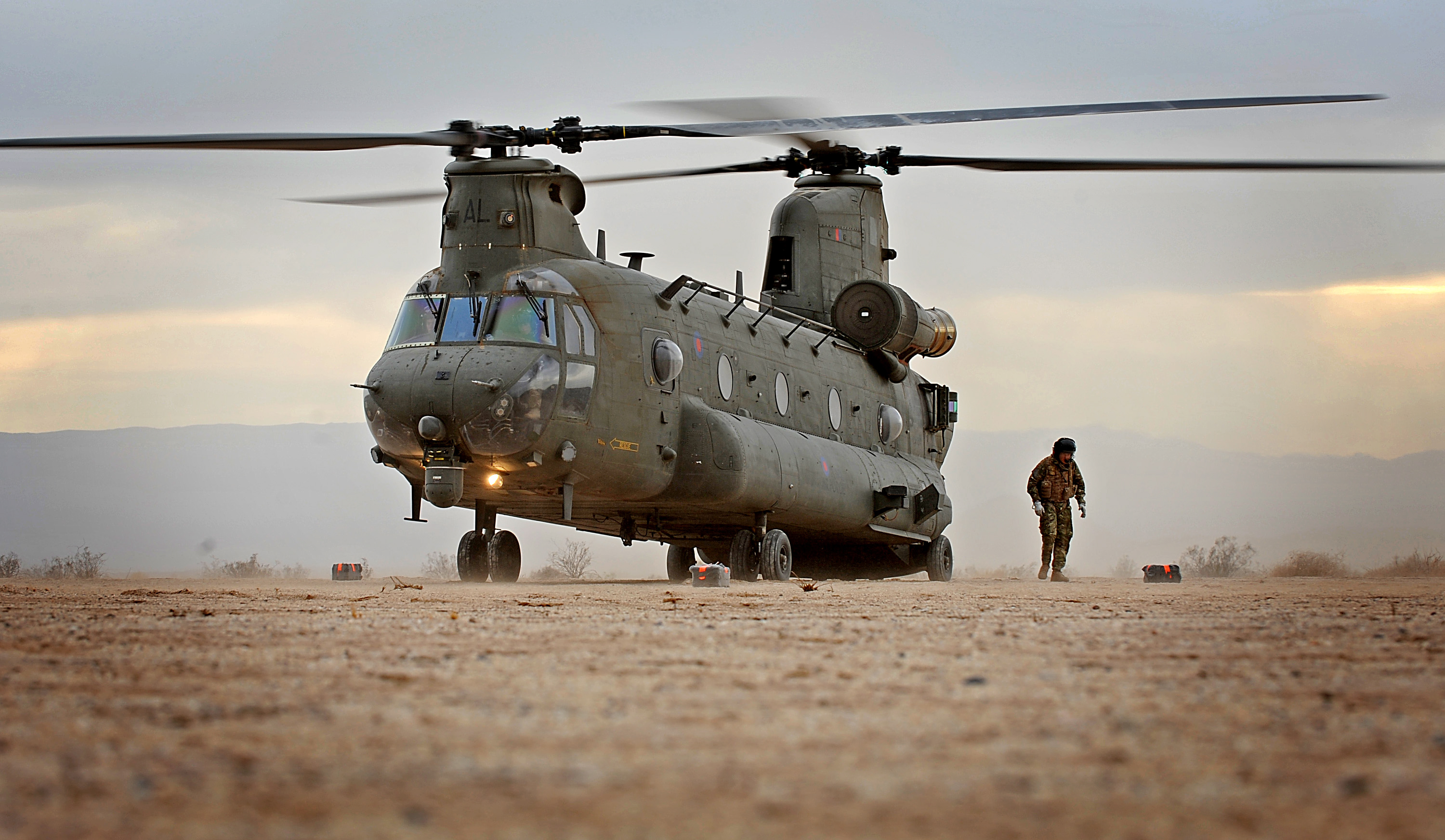
A No. 18 Squadron Boeing Chinook during an exercise in 2014

No. 18 Squadron took part in the UK's deployment to the Gulf in 1990 following the Iraqi invasion of Kuwait. As a result of the Options for Change defence review, which included the transfer of Gütersloh to the British Army, the squadron relocated to RAF Laarbruch in December 1992. With further reductions in the British military presence in Germany, No. 18 Squadron returned to Odiham in August 1997.

The Chinook HC2, equivalent to the US Army CH-47D standard, began to enter RAF service in 1993. The squadron deployed several Chinook HC.2 to Iraq for Operation Telic.

=== 21st century (2000–present) ===
In 2017, the squadron participated in Operation Ruman, the UK relief effort in the Caribbean after Hurricane Irma. In 2018, Chinook HC5 drawn from the squadron formed most of No. 1310 Flight which was deployed to Mali, to support Operation Barkhane, the French-led counter-terrorist operation in the country.

In March 2020, the squadron was awarded the right to emblazon a battle honour on its squadron standard, recognising its role in the War in Afghanistan between 2001 and 2014.

== Heritage ==
The squadron's heraldic badge features a red pegasus rampant, commemorating the squadron's co-operation with the British Army's Cavalry Corps in the Battle of the Somme during the First World War. It was approved by King Edward VIII in May 1936.

The squadron's motto is Animo et fide (Latin for 'With courage and faith').

== Battle honours ==
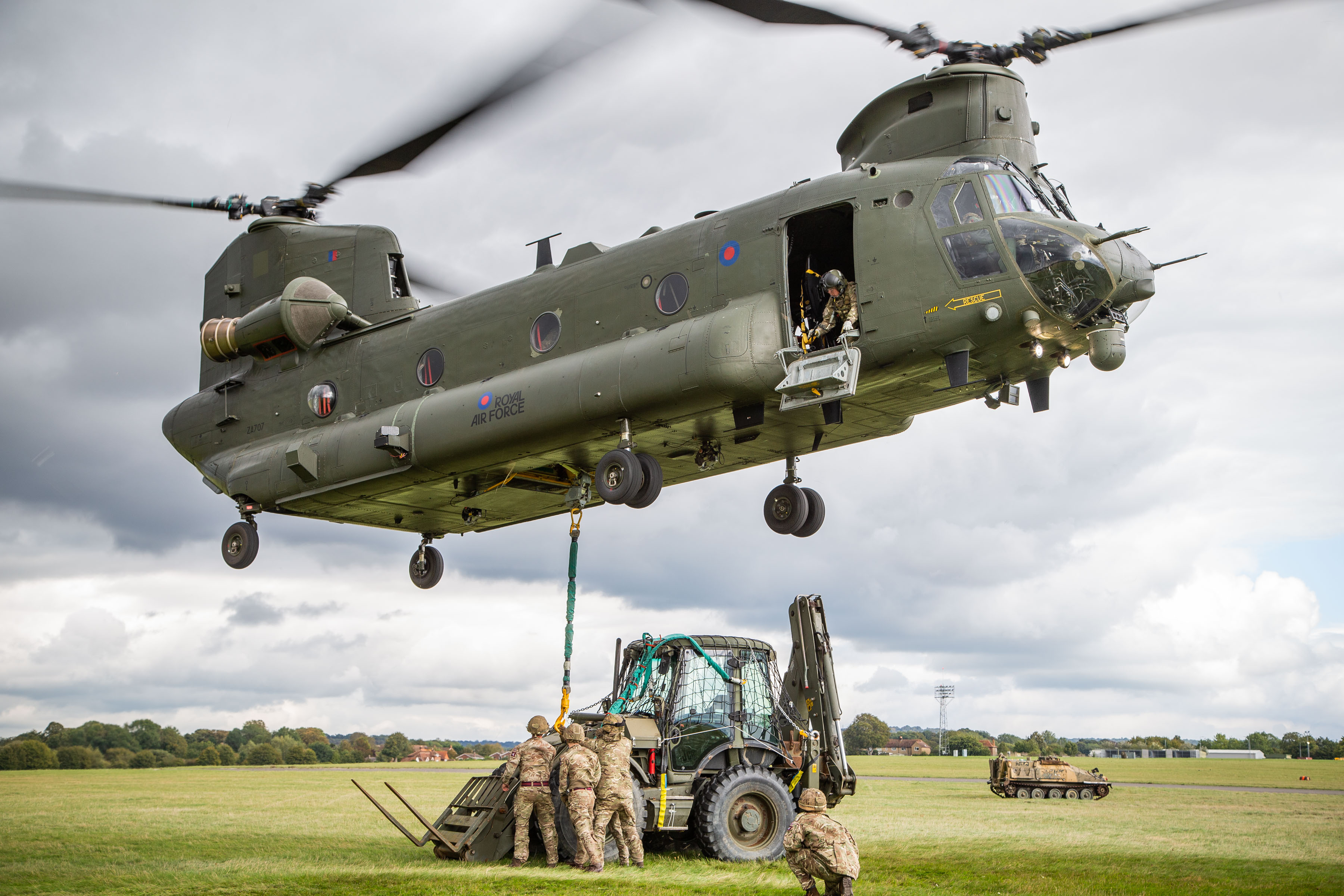
A No. 18 Squadron Boeing Chinook HC6A on exercise in 2020

No. 18 Squadron has received the following battle honours. Those marked with an asterisk (*) may be emblazoned on the squadron standard.

- Western Front (1915–1918)*
- Somme (1916)*
- Somme (1918)*
- Hindenburg Line (1918)*
- Lys (1918)
- France and Low Countries (1939–1940)
- Invasion Ports (1940)*
- Fortress Europe (1940–1942)
- Channel & North Sea (1940–1941)*
- Egypt and Libya (1942)
- North Africa (1942–1943)*
- Mediterranean (1943)
- Sicily (1943)
- Salerno
- South East Europe (1943–1944)
- Italy (1943–1945)*
- Gothic Line (1943–1945)
- South Atlantic (1982)*
- Gulf (1991)
- Afghanistan (2001–2014)*
- Iraq (2003–2011)

== See also ==
- List of Royal Air Force aircraft squadrons
