= Regny =

- Commune
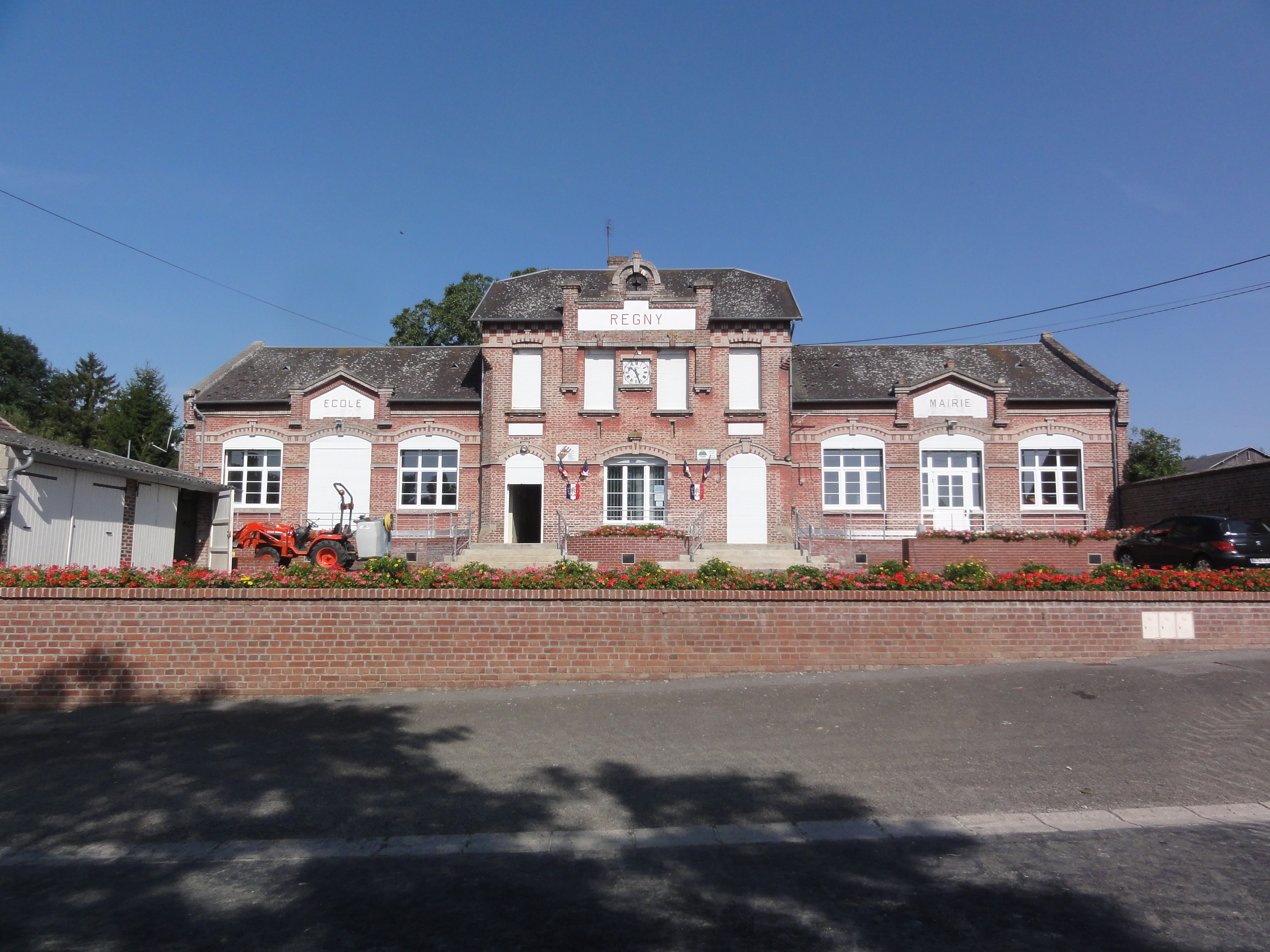
- The town hall and school of Regny
- Location of Regny
- Location within France Location within Hauts-de-France
- Coordinates: 49°49′51″N 3°25′47″E
- Country: France
- Region: Hauts-de-France
- Department: Aisne
- Arrondissement: Saint-Quentin
- Canton: Ribemont
- Intercommunality: Val de l'Oise

Government
  - Mayor (2026–32): Julien Simeon
- Area^{1}: 11.89 km^{2} (4.59 sq mi)
- Elevation: 100 m (330 ft)
- Highest elevation: 124 m (407 ft)
- Lowest elevation: 66 m (217 ft)
- Population (2023): 187
  - Density: 15.7/km^{2} (40.7/sq mi)
- Time zone: UTC+01:00 (CET)
  - Summer (DST): UTC+02:00 (CEST)
- INSEE/Postal code: 02636 /02240
- ^{1} French Land Register data, which excludes lakes, ponds, glaciers > 1 km^{2} (0.386 sq mi or 247 acres) and river estuaries.

Regny (French pronunciation: [ʁəɲi]) is a commune in the Aisne department in Hauts-de-France in northern France.

== Population ==
Historical population
Year	Pop.	±% p.a.
1968	256	—
1975	266	+0.55%
1982	256	−0.55%
1990	234	−1.12%
1999	247	+0.60%
2007	216	−1.66%
2012	207	−0.85%
2017	201	−0.59%
2023	187	−1.20%
Source: INSEE

== See also ==
- Communes of the Aisne department
