= Arthur Jarvis =

Canadian flying ace

Arthur Eyguem De Montaigne Jarvis
- Born: 30 November 1894; Napanee, Ontario
- Died: 20 January 1969 (aged 74)
- Military career
- Allegiance: Canada; United Kingdom
- Branch: Royal Flying Corps; Royal Air Force
- Rank: Lieutenant
- Nickname: Jacko
- Units: 17 (RFC), 150 (RAF)
- Awards: Distinguished Flying Cross

Arthur Eyguem De Montaigne Jarvis (30 November 1894 - 20 January 1969) was a Canadian World War I flying ace credited with 5 victories.

== Text of citations ==
=== Distinguished Flying Cross ===
"Lieut. Arthur Eyguem de Montaingne Jarvis (E. Ontario R.). A bold and determined fighter. On the 26th of July he engaged and shot down an enemy machine, which was seen to crash. Later on the same date he attacked a hostile two-seater and forced it to land near our lines; both occupants were taken prisoners."
