= Frederick Libby =

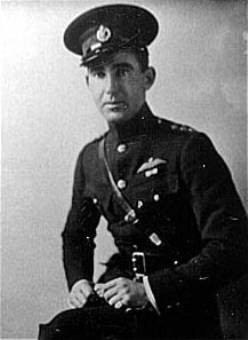
- Frederick Libby, 1918
- Born: 15 July 1891; Sterling, Colorado, United States
- Died: 9 January 1970 (aged 78); Los Angeles, California, United States
- Military career
- Allegiance: Britain; United States
- Branch: Canadian Army; Royal Flying Corps; Air Service, United States Army
- Service years: 1915 – 1917 (RAF)
- Rank: Captain
- Units: Royal Air Force: No. 11 Squadron RAF; No. 23 Squadron RAF; No. 25 Squadron RAF; No. 43 Squadron RAF; Air Service, United States Army: 22d Aero Squadron
- Conflicts: World War I

- Awards: Military Cross (MC)

Captain Frederick Libby (15 July 1891 – 9 January 1970) became the first American flying ace, while serving as an observer in the Royal Flying Corps during World War I.

Libby transferred to the United States Army Air Service on 15 September 1917. He returned to the United States and helped raise war funding through Liberty Loans. He was then invalided out of military service with spondylitis.

Despite his disability, and the predictions that he would die early as a result of his condition, Libby lived into his late seventies, prospering as an oil prospector and businessman. He was a founder of Western Air Lines. In his latter years, he wrote his memoirs, Horses Don't Fly, which was published after his death on 9 January 1970.

== Early life ==
Frederick Libby was born on 15 July 1891 in Sterling, Colorado. His mother died of tuberculosis when he was four years old, leaving him to be raised by his widower father, an older brother, and a live-in housekeeper. He attended local schools for his formal education, and began learning to ride at the age of six. One of his youthful feats was roping a pronghorn at the age of ten.

In the autumn of 1903, he moved to Sabetha, Kansas to temporarily live with his older sister Minnie. By 1904, Libby's father and elder brother had re-established themselves as horse brokers in Minco, Indian Territory; one of their clients was Buffalo Bill. Frederick Libby rejoined them in 1904. He then lived with his aunt in Marshfield, Massachusetts during the school year to attend high school during his fifteenth and sixteenth years. In 1910, Frederick Libby moved to Phoenix, Arizona because of his father's concern (which fortunately proved to be unfounded) that his son might have tuberculosis. The younger Libby first worked for wages as a cowboy while there. He then became an itinerant cowboy and mustanger.

== Military service ==
=== Motor transport ===
Libby was in Calgary, Canada when the war began. He claimed to have joined the Canadian Army on 2 September 1914, although his enlistment papers are dated 5 January 1915 and signed in Toronto. He gave his occupation as chauffeur upon enlistment. His enlistment papers describe him as being 5 ft 8 1/2 in (174 cm) tall, with a medium complexion, brown hair, and gray eyes. He was assigned to motor transport duty in the Canadian Expeditionary Force's supply column. When the Americans in Canadian service were notified that they could be discharged to avoid loss of their citizenship, Libby stayed on.

Libby shipped out of Halifax, Nova Scotia for England on the troopship SS Metagama in April 1915. Upon arrival, his unit staged a short-lived mutiny because they had not been paid. After being paid, they were equipped with brand new trucks–a melange of Locomobiles, Packards, Pierce Arrows, Peerlesses, Leylands, and British Daimlers. They took their new trucks to Rouen, France to begin their assignment supporting the Canadian 2nd Division.

After serving in this motor transport unit through the winter of 1915–1916, he volunteered to join the Royal Flying Corps, becoming an observer in an F.E.2b in 23 Squadron.

=== No. 23 Squadron RFC ===
Frederick Libby volunteered for service with the Royal Flying Corps on a thirty-day probationary period; he said it was to get out of the constant rain. If he proved satisfactory as an aerial observer, he would be commissioned a second lieutenant; if unsatisfactory, he would return to his old unit without prejudice. According to Libby, when he reported to 23 Squadron, he received his machine gun training in the morning, and went on flight status that afternoon. A crack shot since his childhood, he scored his first victory on his very first combat mission, coincidentally his birthday, 15 July 1916, flying with Lieutenant E. D. Hicks.

=== No. 11 Squadron RFC ===
In August 1916, Libby was commissioned and transferred to 11 Squadron. Upon arrival there, the first pilots he met were Albert Ball, John Quested, and Ernest Foot. In his memoirs, written many years after the event, Libby claims to have conceived a buttstock for the Lewis machine guns used by observers, that was then fabricated overnight by the gunnery sergeant of his unit and widely adopted as a standard fitting. Actually, the "ground" Lewis gun came already fitted with such a stock as standard, this being replaced in the standard "air" form of the gun with a spade grip, for "handiness" and to save weight. Libby was one of a number of observers, especially those serving in the precarious perch that was the front cockpit of an F.E.2b, who preferred their Lewis guns with the original "rifle style" stock, braced against the shoulder. This suited his "marksman-type" shooting style; it also freed up a hand that could be used to hang onto the aircraft, adding stability for more accurate fire, as well as greater safety for the observer.

Libby claimed five victories while teamed with Captain (later Major) Stephen Price; one of the victories was shared with Lionel Rees. He became an ace on 25 August 1916, and by 20 October 1916 he was a double ace as an observer on Royal Aircraft Factory F.E.2s.

His description of an observer's duties included the following passage about manning the rear gun on an F.E.2):

The observer position was in the open front of the plane with the pilot behind him, and a reversed in-line piston-engine/propeller drivetrain was situated behind both of them, shoving all and sundry through the air

The mounting consists of a hollow steel rod, into which a solid steel rod is fitted to work up and down with the machine gun on top. To operate this you simply pull the gun up as high as possible, where it locks into the fitting, then you step out of the nacelle and stand with a foot on each side. From this position, you have nothing to worry about except being blown out of the ship or being tossed out if the pilot makes a wrong move. This gun, I know, I am not going to like very much.

On 15 September 1916, Libby was an eyewitness to the first use of tanks in battle while he was on observation duty over the battlefield. Two days later Oswald Boelcke and Jasta 2 shot down 11 Squadron's entire C Flight, along with two escorting Airco DH.2 fighters. Libby's B Flight was thrown into the resulting breach, but suffered no losses.

On 28 October 1916, Libby was posted to Home Establishment for pilot training. He was granted leave until 1 January 1917. His leave was interrupted on 13 December 1916 when he and Captain Price were awarded the Military Cross by King George V at Buckingham Palace.

=== No. 43 Squadron RFC; No. 25 Squadron RFC ===
After completing pilot training on 5 March 1917, Libby was posted to No. 43 Squadron on 7 March, piloting the Sopwith 1½ Strutter two-seater fighter/reconnaissance aircraft. After scoring two victories, he was reassigned to No. 25 Squadron as an Airco DH.4 bomber pilot in August 1917, where he scored twice more. During this assignment, on 28 May 1917 he began flying the American flag as command streamers during his sorties.

Upon promotion to Flight Commander, Libby transferred to 25 Squadron, which shared its airfield with 43 Squadron. He was assigned B Flight. Libby was nearly killed by accident around this time. The DH.4 had controls accessible to the observer, and while engaged in a dogfight, a Lewis gun ammunition drum jammed the rudder, slewing it into a constant right hand turn. Once the problem was remedied, Libby returned to base. His experience led to the rear seat rudder bar being covered by plywood.

Libby would serve with 25 Squadron until he left the RFC. By the time he transferred to U.S. service, his combat tally–as both observer and pilots–consisted of two enemy aircraft destroyed (including one shared), and 12 driven down out of control (including four shared).

=== Transfer to American service ===
On 15 September 1917, Libby transferred to the United States Army Air Service, at the request of General Billy Mitchell. He returned to the United States and reclaimed his citizenship. He participated in the Liberty Loan drive by auctioning off his flight streamers. He was sent to join the 22nd Aero Squadron at Hicks Field in Texas, but was dismayed by its disorganization, especially the hospital. Libby was suffering from chronic back pain by this time and was found to be permanently disabled by Ankylosing spondylitis and medically unfit for further military service. Libby never flew a combat mission for the United States Air Service.

== Post-war life ==
Frederick Libby married Caroline Von Stein. She had previously adopted a niece and nephew whose mother had died of the Spanish flu. Libby lived a partial cripple for the rest of his life. Despite his disabilities and a doctor's prediction he would die before age 40, Libby went into the oil prospecting business, founding Eastern Oil Company and consulting for Union Oil and Richfield. He was also the founder of Western Air Express. In the process, he made millions of dollars; he also went broke. In 1961, he wrote his memoir, and this was published posthumously as Horses Don't Fly. He died in Los Angeles on 9 January 1970.

== Aerial victories ==
Date	Unit	Aircraft	Opponent and fate	Location
15 July 1916	23 Squadron	F.E.2b	AGO C (DESF)	Bapaume
22 August 1916	11 Squadron	F.E.2b (serial 6994)	Roland C.II (OOC)	S of Bapaume
22 August 1916	11 Squadron	F.E.2b (6994)	Roland C.II (OOC)	S of Bapaume
22 August 1916	11 Squadron	F.E.2b (6994)	Roland C.II (OOC)	S of Bapaume
25 August 1916	11 Squadron	F.E.2b (6994)	Aviatik C (OOC)	Bapaume
14 September 1916	11 Squadron	F.E.2b (6994)	Two-seater (OOC)	SE of Bapaume
22 September 1916	11 Squadron	F.E.2b	Scout (OOC)	Logeast
10 October 1916	11 Squadron	F.E.2b (7678)	Scout (OOC)	Bapaume
17 October 1916	11 Squadron	F.E.2b (7027)	Albatros D.I (OOC)	Mory
20 October 1916	11 Squadron	F.E.2b (7027)	Albatros D.I (OOC)	Douxcette-Ayette
6 May 1917	43 Squadron	Sopwith 1½ Strutter (A1010)	Two-seater (DES)	S of Avion
23 July 1917	43 Squadron	Sopwith 1½ Strutter (A8785)	Albatros D.III (OOC)	NE of Lens
8 August 1917	25 Squadron	DH.4 (A7543)	Albatros D.V (OOC)	Henin Lietard
14 August 1917	25 Squadron	DH.4 (A7543)	Two-seater (OOC)	Lens

== See also ==
- List of World War I flying aces from the United States
