= James McKinley Hargreaves =

British aviator

- Born: 19 January 1883; Glasgow, Scotland
- Died: 1963 (aged 80); Reading, England
- Burial place: Reading, England
- Military career
- Allegiance: United Kingdom
- Branch: British Army
- Rank: Sergeant
- Service number: 1232
- Unit: 11 Squadron RAF
- Conflicts: World War I • Western Front
- Awards: Distinguished Conduct Medal

Sergeant James McKinley Hargreaves DCM (19 January 1883 – 1963) was a Scottish World War I flying ace. Despite being an observer, he became one of the first flying aces in history while flying with Lionel Rees, VC.

== Military service ==
Hargreaves joined the Royal Flying Corps in early 1913, aged 30, receiving service number 1232.

He was assigned No. 11 Squadron, the first British flying squadron to be equipped with a purpose-built fighter aircraft, the pusher Vickers Gunbus. The squadron arrived in France on 25 July 1915, at approximately the time Adolphe Pegoud became the first ace in history. Three days later, Hargreaves scored his first aerial victory while teamed with Rees in Gunbus Serial No. 1649, driving a Fokker Eindekker down out of control. On 31 August, they destroyed an LVG two-seater reconnaissance plane. Hargreaves' third victory came on 21 September, when he drove down an AGO reconnaissance aircraft over Herbecourt. The next day, he repeated the feat, driving down an Albatros two-seater south-east of Albert. On the 30th, they forced down another Albatros, this one from the German artillery cooperation squadron, Feld-Flieger-Abteilung 23. The dying crew crash-landed behind British lines, and the aircraft was captured.

Hargreaves was awarded the Distinguished Conduct Medal for his valour, his citation reading:

1232 Flight-Serjeant J. Hargreaves, No. 11 Squadron, Royal Flying Corps.

For conspicuous gallantry and skill on several occasions, notably the following:
On 21 September 1915, when in a machine armed with one machine-gun and piloted by Captain Rees, a large German Biplane armed with two machine-guns was sighted 2,000 feet below. Our machine spiralled down and engaged the enemy, who, being faster, manoeuvred to get broadside on and then opened fire. The attack, however, was pressed, and the engine of the enemy's biplane was apparently struck, for after a quick turn it glided down some distance and then fell just inside the German lines. On 31 August Captain Rees, with Flight-Serjeant Hargreaves, fought a powerful German machine for three-quarters of an hour. They then returned for more ammunition and went out again to the attack. Finally the enemy's machine was brought down apparently wrecked.

Rees received the Military Cross.

Hargreaves then trained a pilot, being granted Royal Aero Club Aviators' Certificate No. 1887 after soloing in a Maurice Farman biplane at the British Flying School at Le Crotoy, France on 13 October 1915.

=== List of aerial victories ===
Victories
No.	Date/time	Aircraft	Foe	Result	Location	Notes
1	28 July 1915	Vickers F.B.5; Serial number 1649	Fokker Eindecker	Driven down		With Lionel Rees VC
2	31 August 1915	Vickers F.B.5 s/n 1649	LVG two-seater	Destroyed	Achiet du Grande	With Lionel Rees VC
3	21 September 1915 @ 11:00 hours	Vickers F.B.5	AGO two-seater	Driven down	Herbécourt	With Lionel Rees VC
4	22 September 1915 @ 17:30 hours	Vickers F.B.5	Albatros two-seater	Driven down	Southeast of Albert	With Lionel Rees VC
5	30 September 1915	Vickers F.B.5	Albatros two-seater	Captured	Gommecourt	With Lionel Rees VC
