= John Quested =

John Quested may refer to:

- John Quested (officer) (1893–1948), English World War I flying ace
- John Quested (producer) (born 1935), British film producer
