= Gustav Leffers =

German flying ace

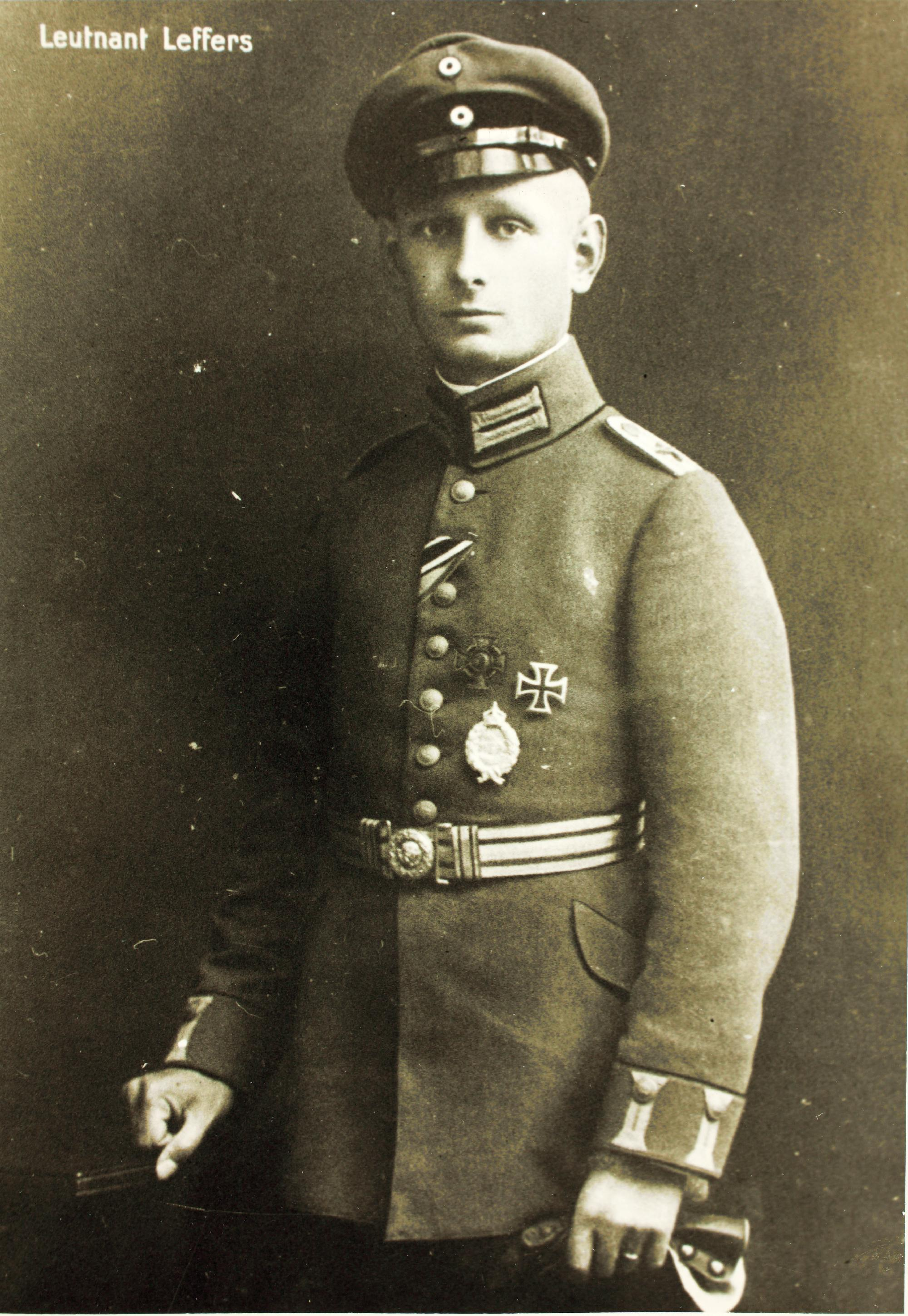
- Born: 2 January 1895; Wilhelmshaven, Germany
- Died: 27 December 1916 (aged 21) near Cerisy, France
- Military career
- Allegiance: German Empire
- Branch: Luftstreitkräfte
- Service years: 1914–16
- Rank: Leutnant (Second Lieutenant)
- Units: FFA 32, KEK B, Abwehr Kommando Nord, Jasta 1
- Awards: Pour le Merite, Royal House Order of Hohenzollern, Iron Cross, Friedrich-August-Kreuz

Leutnant Gustav Leffers (2 January 1895 –27 December 1916) was a German flying ace in World War I, credited with 9 victories.

== Early life ==
Leffers was born in Wilhelmshaven, the son of a naval engineer. He was educated in Wilhelmshaven and Stettin and went on to join the Holland America Line as an engineer candidate. In July 1914, just prior to the start of the First World War, he returned from a cruise to the United States.

== War service ==
Leffers was assigned to a field telegraph battalion but, with his engineering background, was then reassigned to the Fliegertruppen. After pilot training, he was posted to FFA 32 in February 1915, flying over the northern part of the 2. Armee sector. Starting as a Gefreiter, Leffers rose rapidly through the ranks to become a leutnant der reserve on the basis of his excellent performance in reconnaissance roles flying LVG B type aircraft.

On 24 September 1915, Leffers was sent for training on single-seater aircraft at Mannheim. He returned to his unit on 5 November of that year in a Fokker Eindecker EIII (No. 86/15), the first to be attached to FFA 32. The aircraft was destroyed on landing due to a mechanical systems fault; however Leffers ferried in No. 84/15 of the same type onto the unit's strength by 11 November. He scored his first aircraft destroyed on 5 December 1915, a BE-2c of No.13 Squadron.

By March 1916 Leffers had four air victories. His fourth, on 13 March, was especially hair-raising. He barely escaped a midair collision, scraping his plane's landing wheels across a Royal Aircraft Factory BE.2c's upper wing before turning onto its tail and incinerating both the British plane and its crew.

FFA 32's fighter element eventually became Jasta 1, and Leffers scored another 4 times with the Jasta. He received the Royal House Order of Hohenzollern after his sixth victory on 31 August 1916, and the Pour le Merite in November 1916 after his eighth win. Leffers' seventh victim insists he was shot down by a Nieuport; it seems Leffers used his captured French plane for this victory.

On 27 December Lt. Leffers was shot down and killed in combat with FE-2b's of No 11 Squadron RFC, the most likely victors being the crew of Capt. John Quested and Lt. H. J. H. Dicksee. He was flying the captured Nieuport when he was killed.

== Awards and decorations ==
- Pour le Mérite (5 November 1916)
- Royal House Order of Hohenzollern
- Iron Cross of 1914, 1st and 2nd class
- Friedrich August Cross
