= Vickers E.F.B.1 =

General information
- Type: Fighter aircraft
- National origin: United Kingdom
- Manufacturer: Vickers
- Designer: G.H. Challenger and A.R. Low
- Number built: 1

History
- Introduction date: 1912

The Vickers E.F.B.1 'Destroyer' was an early British military aircraft prototype. Although not itself a success, the design was considered worth developing, and a series of similar aircraft were produced in prototype form, eventually leading to the Vickers F.B.5 "Gunbus", which saw widespread service during World War I.

== Design ==
The Experimental Fighting Biplane No. 1 (E.F.B.1) was designed in response to a British Admiralty requirement for an aircraft intended for an offensive role. As such, it was notable for being the first British aircraft to be specifically designed for a military role. A contract for an experimental prototype was given to Vickers on 19 November 1912.

The resulting aircraft was an unequal-span staggered wing, two-bay pusher biplane with the tailplane mounted on booms behind the wings and the crew of two housed in a nacelle above the lower wing, with the engine behind them. The pusher layout was chosen to meet the requirement for a forward-firing gun, since gun synchronisation mechanisms had not been developed at the time. Extensive use of metal was made in its structure, the tail booms and wing spars being made of steel and the nacelle of steel tube with a covering of sheet duralumin.

Lateral control was effected by wing warping, and in order to prevent fatiguing of the structure caused by warping loads the rear wing spar was built in three sections, the outer sections being hinged to the centre section, and the wing ribs were loosely threaded onto the spars.

The armament consisted of a single belt-fed 0.303 Vickers-Maxim machine gun mounted at the front of the nacelle on a flexible mounting.

It was exhibited at the Aero show at Olympia in February 1913, but crashed soon afterwards, possibly on its first flight. Nevertheless, the design was considered promising enough for work to be started on another aircraft of similar design, the Vickers E.F.B.2, and this line of development would eventually lead to the Vickers F.B.5 Gunbus.

== Specifications ==
Data from

General characteristics

- Crew: two
- Length: 27 ft 6 in (8.38 m)
- Upper wingspan: 40 ft (12 m)
- Lower wingspan: 30 ft (9.1 m)
- Empty weight: 1,760 lb (798 kg)
- Gross weight: 2,660 lb (1,207 kg)
- Powerplant: 1 × Wolseley Type B V-8 air-cooled piston engine, 80 hp (60 kW) with water-cooled valves
- Propellers: 4-bladed Vickers-Levasseur

Performance

- Maximum speed: 70 mph (110 km/h, 61 kn) at sea level
- Endurance: 4½ hours
- Rate of climb: 450 ft/min (2.3 m/s)

Armament

- Guns: One 0.303 in (7.7 mm) Vickers-Maxim belt-fed machine gun

== Comparable aircraft ==
- Royal Aircraft Factory F.E.3
- Grahame-White Type VI
