= Stephen Price (RAF officer) =

British flying ace (1893–1974)

Stephen William Price
- Born: 28 November 1893; South Hornsey, London, England
- Died: 19 April 1974 (aged 80); Chichester, Sussex, England
- Military career
- Allegiance: United Kingdom
- Branch: British Army; Royal Air Force
- Rank: Major
- Units: Leicestershire Regiment; No. 23 Squadron RFC; No. 11 Squadron RFC; No. 33 (Home Defence) Squadron RFC; No. 36 Squadron (Home Defence) RFC
- Commands: No. 83 Squadron RAF
- Conflicts: World War I • Western Front; World War II
- Awards: Military Cross

Major Stephen William Price MC (28 November 1893 – 19 April 1974) was a British World War I flying ace credited with seven aerial victories.

== World War I ==
Price was commissioned as a second lieutenant on 19 September 1914, after serving as a cadet in the Officers Training Corps, and served in the 8th Battalion, Leicestershire Regiment. He eventually transferred to the Royal Flying Corps, and was granted Royal Aero Club Aviators' Certificate No. 1970 on 27 October 1915, having successfully soloed in a Maurice Farman biplane at the Military School, Ruislip. On completion of his flight training, Price was appointed a flying officer on 20 January 1916, and transferred to the General List for service with the RFC. He was promoted to lieutenant on 1 April 1916.

Although Price served in several squadrons, all his successes came while serving in No. 11 Squadron, flying a F.E.2b two-seater, with American ace Lieutenant Frederick Libby as his gunner. Price was appointed a flight commander with the temporary rank of captain on 4 August 1916, between 22 August and 17 October, the two men drove down five enemy reconnaissance aircraft over Bapaume, and an Albatros D.I over Mory. On 22 October, they shot down another Albatros D.I in flames over Douchy-lès-Ayette.

Price was subsequently awarded the Military Cross, which was gazetted on 25 November 1916. His citation read:

"For conspicuous gallantry in action. During a reconnaissance he was attacked by a large number of enemy machines. He manoeuvred his machine with great skill, and fought down a hostile machine. On four previous occasions he and his observer have accounted for enemy machines."

On 1 January 1918 Price was appointed a squadron commander with the temporary rank of major, taking command of No. 83 Squadron. He was transferred to the unemployed list of the RAF on 31 January 1919.

Between the wars Price worked as a solicitor and served as an Under-Sheriff of London, 1935–1936.

== World War II ==
On 25 April 1939 Price was granted a commission as a pilot officer on probation in the Administrative & Special Duties Branch of the Royal Air Force Volunteer Reserve. He was confirmed in his appointment and promoted to flying officer on 1 September 1939, just days before the declaration of war on Germany. However, on 27 April 1941, he resigned his commission.

Price died in Midhurst, Sussex, on 19 April 1974.
