= Archibald Reith Low =

British pilot and aeronautics pioneer

Major Archibald Reith Low FRAeS
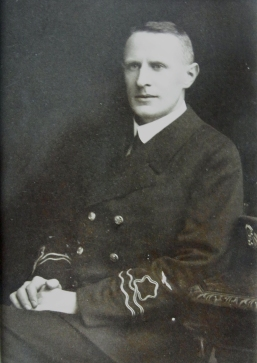
- Born: 31 December 1878; Aberdeen, Scotland, UK
- Died: 21 January 1969 (aged 90); Wimborne, Dorset, England, UK

Archibald Reith Low (31 December 1878 – 21 January 1969) was a British pilot and aeronautics pioneer. He designed the Vickers F.B.5. and Vickers E.F.B.1. According to Mervyn O'Gorman, Low coined the term "drag" to refer to aerodynamic drag.

== Life ==
Born in Aberdeen, Low was one of eight children of his father, a Church of Scotland minister and Jane Stuart Reith, aunt to Lord Reith. He was educated at George Watson's College and Edinburgh University, and at Clare College, Cambridge.

Low held the rank of Second Lieutenant in the City of London Imperial Volunteers. He held the rank of Acting Lieutenant Commander in the Royal Navy Volunteer Reserve attached to the Royal Naval Air Service (RNAS). When on 1 April 1918, the RNAS was merged with the British Army's Royal Flying Corps to form the Royal Air Force (the world's first independent air force), he held the rank of Major (in the Royal Air Force). He had therefore held a commission in all three services. The new rank structure for the RAF was not introduced into the RAF until 4 August 1919, following inter-service squabbling in the wake of massive post-war defence cuts, which reached a new low when the Army and Navy refused to allow the RAF to use their officer ranks, forcing Trenchard to create new ones. The new rank titles (Pilot Officer, Flight Lieutenant etc.) came into being on this date. So Low, having been retired before then, continued to call himself "Major A R Low, RAF" despite, in the early 1920s, it is believed that a directive was issued that the old ranks were no longer to be used and that the new ranks were to be used instead. He was awarded the star (S.), Victory (V.) Medal and the British War Medal (BS.).; they were irreverently known as Pip, Squeak and Wildfred, respectively.

== Career ==
Date	Event
12 October 1900	Adm. at Clare College, Cambridge. School, Edinburgh Academy (not in Edinburgh Academy Register).
23 June 1903	He graduated Bachelor of Arts (BA). He had studied first for the Mathematical Tripos, as the honours BA is known, and in the examinations for Part I of the tripos in Easter term 1902 was awarded a third class pass. He then switched to studying for the Mechanical Sciences tripos. In the examinations for this tripos in Easter term 1903 he was awarded a third class pass. He was awarded MA by proxy (that is, in absentia) on 5 August 1961.
1906	Appointed assistant head designer, and later head designer at Johnson & Phillips Ltd, Charlton, London.
July & August 1910	Learnt to fly at the Farman School at Étampes, France; followed by employment at the Bristol Flying School at Brooklands, where he helped design the unsuccessful Bristol Monoplane.
22 November 1910	Royal Aero Club certificate taken on Bristol Biplane at Brooklands
1911 to 1913	Appointed chief designer at Vickers in their newly formed Vickers Ltd (Aviation Department). Designed the Vickers Gun Bus, the first aeroplane to be designed as a fighter.
4 February 1915	Entered RNAS as Lieutenant RNVR. Posted to HMS Engadine and HMS Ben-my-Chree (with the latter in the Dardanelles with the East Indies and Egypt Seaplane Squadron) as a pilot.
25 July 1916	"A/70016. D.A.S. 25.7.16:- Telegram to CinC East Indies for this officer to be sent home for duty in Air Dept."
5 September 1916	Posted to Air Dept "B" Section.
12 October 1916	Posted to "D" Flight, Royal Navy Aeroplane Repair Depot on the Isle of Grain on the River Medway.
29 December 1916	By Grain: Languages French, German. "Has very valuable practical & theoretical knowledge of Seaplanes & Aeroplanes"
12 March 1917	Posted to Air Dept (N.A.D.) "Technical Allowance 5 shillings".
26 November 1917	By Wg Cdr A.M. Longmore: "Very strongly recommended for promotion."
1 December 1917	By General Pitcher, Air Board: "Recommended for promotion"
31 December 1917	Promoted: "Act Lieut.Cdr RNVR" (his 39th birthday).
14 January 1918	"a/133523 cw/22825. 14.1.18:- Submission put forward for promotion to rank of Act Lt.Cdr."
23 January 1918	"Cw List 23.1.18. To revert to Lieut on return to RNAS
1 April 1918	London Gazette AFL C76637 4/19: "Promoted Major w.e.f. 1.4.18"
19 August 1919	London Gazette 1048D 19/8/19: "Transferred to Unemployed List w.e.f. 11.7.19". "Service Considered for the Grant of War Medals"
1919	Chief Librarian at the Air Ministry.
1932	Appointed Senior Technical Officer at Orfordness Beacon, which was "The Birthplace of Radar", where he was known as a "boffin", a new term at the time for a person engaged in unspecified scientific or technical research, and where he became a lifelong friend of Henry Tizard, who started the Advisory Committee for Aeronautics.
1938	Transferred to the Royal Aircraft Establishment, Farnborough Airport, to work in the Directorate of Technical Development, where a second station operating on the same principle as at Orfordness Beacon was set up to provide wider area coverage and allow two-bearing fixes between Orfordness and Farnborough Airport.
1940	Emigrated to Canada to work at one of the munitions factories there to perfect tracer bullet techniques. He then became a scientific adviser to the Canadian Government War Department.
1949	Retired to Switzerland, aged 71.

== Publications ==
1. Normal Elliptic Functions (University of Toronto Press 1950)

== See also ==
- List of pilots awarded an Aviator's Certificate by the Royal Aero Club in 1910
