= Wolseley 60 hp =

1910s British piston aircraft engine

60 hp
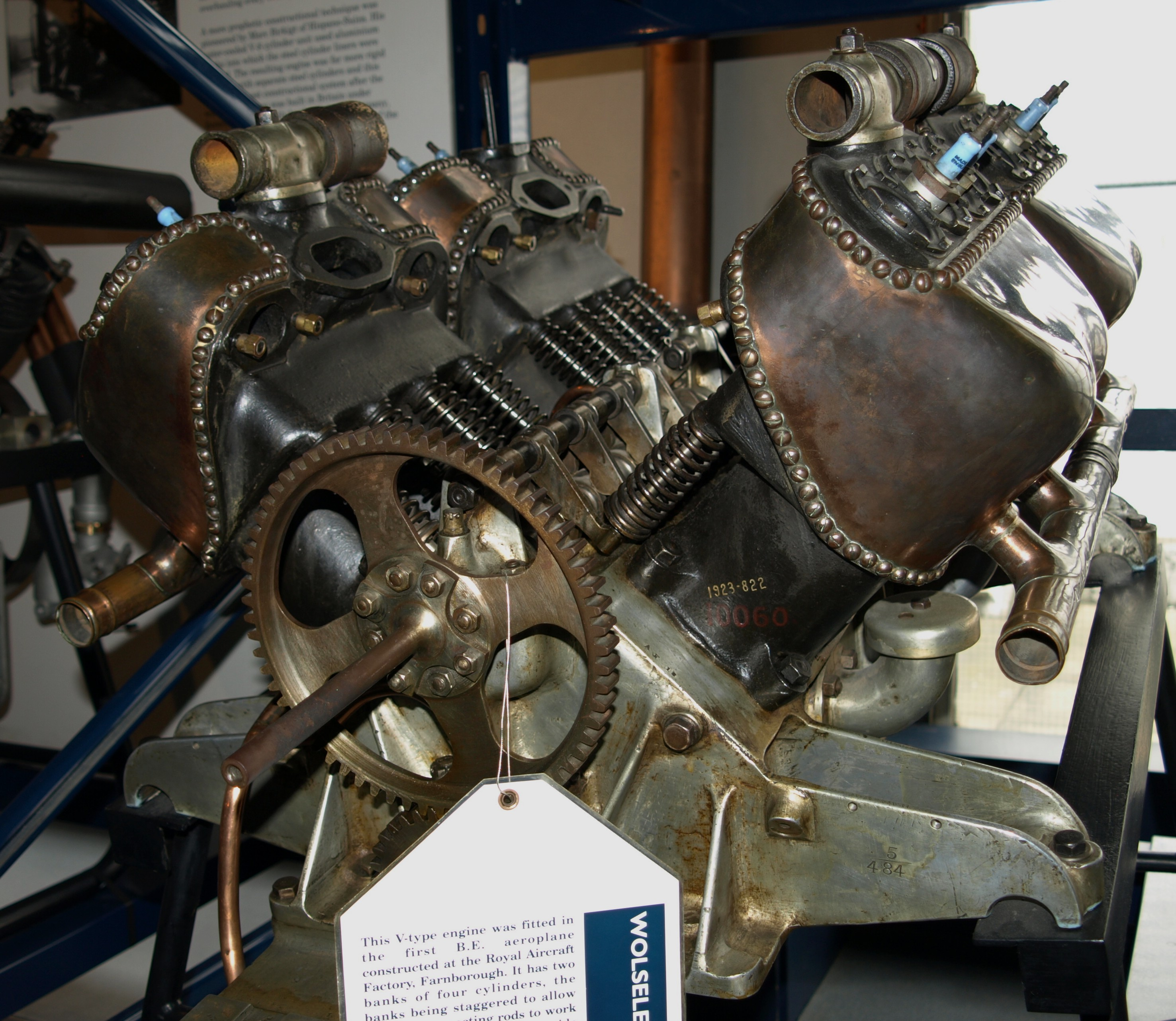
- Preserved Wolseley 60 hp
- Type: Piston inline aero engine
- Manufacturer: Wolseley Motors Limited
- First run: 1910
- Major applications: Royal Aircraft Factory B.E.1

The Wolseley 60 hp or Type C was a British liquid-cooled V8 aero engine that first ran in 1910, it was designed and built by Wolseley Motors. The engine featured water-cooled exhaust ports and employed a 20 lb (9 kg) flywheel. During an official four-hour test the engine produced an average of 55 horsepower (41 kW). A larger capacity variant known as the 80 hp or Type B used an internal camshaft and propeller reduction gear.

== Applications ==
60 hp

- Royal Aircraft Factory B.E.1
- Royal Aircraft Factory B.E.2

80 hp

- Vickers E.F.B.1

== Engines on display ==
A preserved Wolseley 60 hp is on public display at the Science Museum (London).

== Specifications (60 hp) ==
Data from Lumsden.

=== General characteristics ===
- Type: Upright, 90-degree V8
- Bore: 3.74 in (95 mm)
- Stroke: 5.51 in (140 mm)
- Displacement: 482 cu in (7.9 L)
- Dry weight: 385 lb (175 kg)

=== Components ===
- Valvetrain: Sidevalve with single external camshaft
- Fuel system: Single Zenith carburettor
- Fuel type: 40-50 octane petrol
- Cooling system: Air-cooled with liquid-cooled exhausts
- Reduction gear: Direct drive, left-hand tractor

=== Performance ===
- Power output: 60 hp (45 kW) at 1,800 rpm (maximum power)
- Specific power: 0.12 hp/cu in (5.7 kw/L)
- Power-to-weight ratio: 0.15 hp/lb (0.25 kW/kg)

== See also ==
Comparable engines

- RAF 1

Related lists

- List of aircraft engines
