= Donald Beard =

British World War I flying ace

Donald Wainwright Beard
- Born: 20 May 1895; Elworth, Sandbach, Cheshire, England
- Died: 1980
- Military career
- Allegiance: United Kingdom
- Branch: British Army; Royal Air Force
- Rank: Lieutenant
- Units: No. 4 Squadron RFC; No. 11 Squadron RAF
- Conflicts: World War I World War II
- Awards: Military Medal

Lieutenant Donald Wainwright Beard, MM (20 May 1895 – 1980) was a British World War I flying ace credited with eight aerial victories.

== Early life and service ==
Donald Wainwright Beard was born in Sandbach, Cheshire, England on 20 May 1895. Beard originally joined the Royal Flying Corps as a mechanic on 20 August 1913.

== World War I service ==
Beard deployed to France with his unit when the war began. As he worked at his ground assignment, he agitated for opportunities to fly. He was manning the guns in the observer's seat of a Royal Aircraft Factory B.E.2 on a No. 4 Squadron RFC mission flown on 20 July 1916. During a dogfight, Captain Copeland, the pilot, was wounded. Beard shot down the attacking Pfalz E.I, then flew the B.E.2 home. His heroism earned him a Military Medal and a chance for pilot training.

Training completed, he was assigned to No. 11 Squadron RFC as a sergeant pilot of a Bristol F.2 Fighter dubbed "Amy" on 26 November 1917. On 9 March 1918, with Sergeant H. W. Scarnell manning the rear guns, Beard drove a German Pfalz D.III down out of control. Six days later, the same team destroyed an Albatros D.III fighter and drove down two others. A week later, with Second Lieutenant H. M. Stewart as gunner, Beard set an Albatros D.V on fire. On 3 April 1918, Beard was commissioned as a Temporary Second Lieutenant. Beard's final victories came on 9 May 1918, when he destroyed one Pfalz D.III and drove another down out of control.

== Between the wars ==
On 10 December 1920, Beard gave up his commission because of poor health caused by military service.

Beard married Stella Marie Gladys Londt. She died in a car crash on 27 December 1933, aged 22; their infant daughter Sally died shortly thereafter on 1 January 1934.

== World War II ==
Beard was commissioned as a Flying Officer for the duration of World War II on 18 November 1940. On 22 January 1941, probationary Pilot Officer Beard was assigned to administrative duty. On 20 July, he was transferred to the Technical Branch. On 18 November 1941, Beard transferred into the reserves. On 13 March 1942, he once again resigned his commission as Pilot Officer because of poor health. As of 8 April 1947, he is also shown resigning his commission, which may indicate he returned to duty after the 1942 resignation.

== Later life ==
He later worked as an engineer and a salesman at a Sandbach motor firm.

== Honours and awards ==
Awarded the Military Medal on 9 December 1916. Sergeant with Serial no. 839.
