= Vickers F.B.5 =

Fighter aircraft; first operational purpose-built fighter

Vickers F.B 5 "Gunbus"
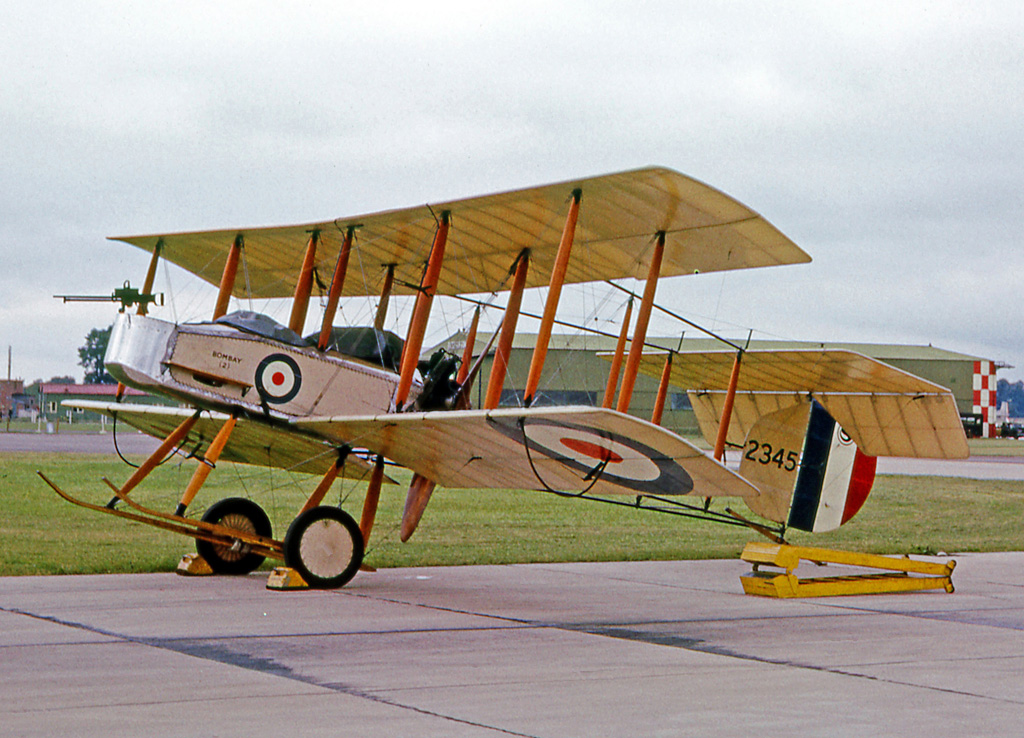
- Airworthy Gunbus replica built in 1966 and painted in RFC colours

General information
- Type: Fighter
- Manufacturer: Vickers Limited
- Designer: Archibald Reith Low
- Primary user: Royal Flying Corps
- Number built: 207 F.B.5s; 119 F.B.9s

History
- Introduction date: November 1914
- First flight: 17 July 1914
- Retired: July 1916 (Royal Flying Corps); 1924 (Denmark)

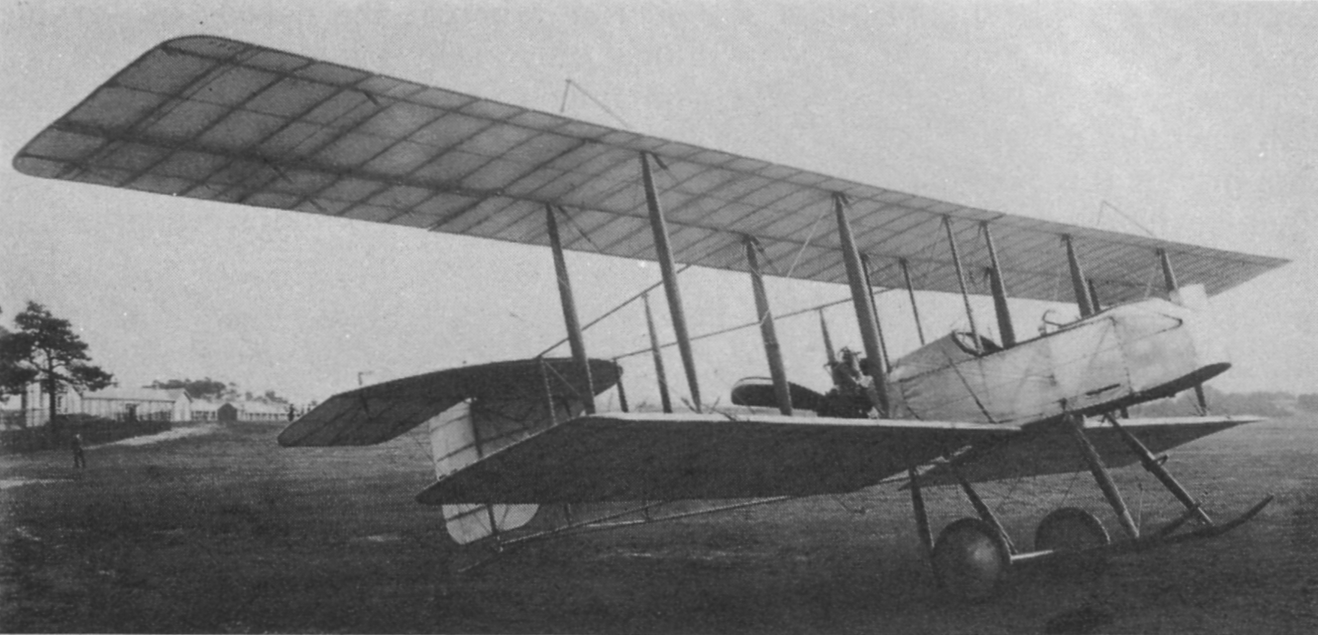
The sole F.B.6 shows off its overhang.

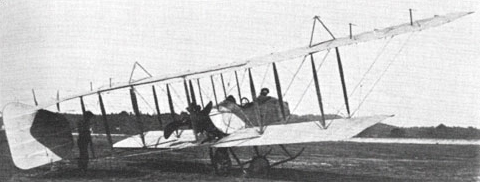
The F.B.6

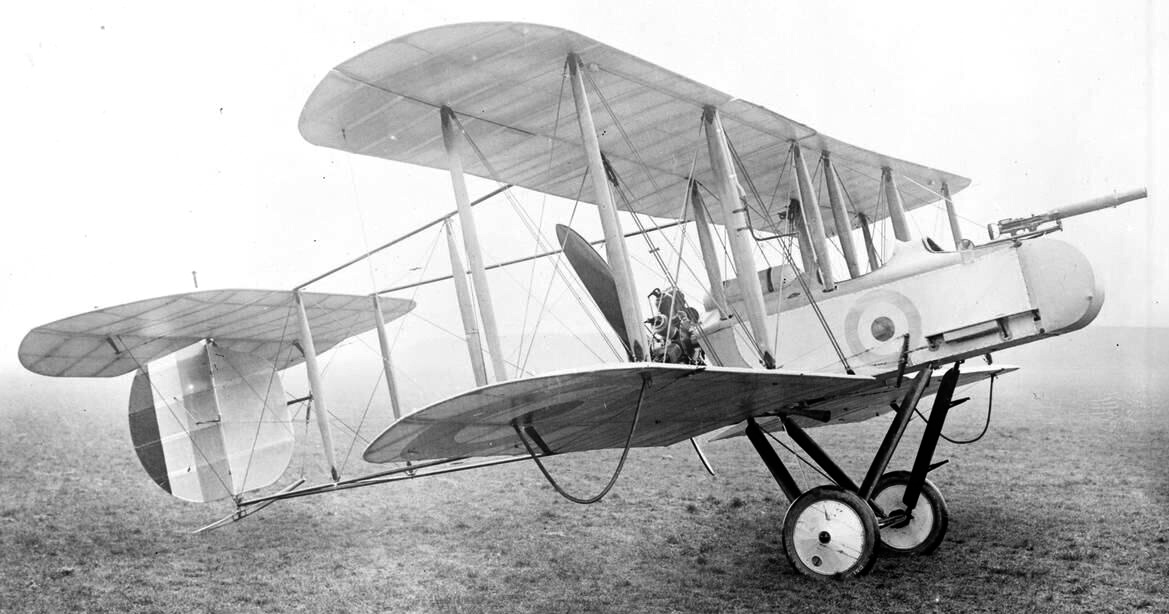
F.B.9

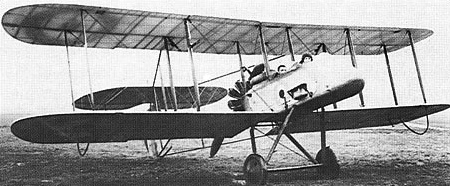
F.B.9

The Vickers F.B.5 (Fighting Biplane 5) known as the "Gunbus", was a British two-seat pusher military biplane of the First World War. Armed with a single .303 in (7.7 mm) Lewis gun operated by the observer in the front of the nacelle, it was the first aircraft purpose-built for air-to-air combat to see service, making it the world's first operational fighter aircraft.

== Design and development ==
Vickers began experimenting with the concept of an armed warplane designed to destroy other aircraft in 1912. The first resulting aircraft was the "Destroyer" (later designated Vickers E.F.B.1) which was shown at the Olympia Aero Show in February 1913, but crashed on its maiden flight. This aircraft was of the "Farman" pusher layout, to avoid the problem of firing through a tractor propeller, and was armed with a single belt-fed Vickers gun.

Vickers continued to pursue the development of armed pusher biplanes, and their Chief Designer Archie Low drew up a new design, the Vickers Type 18, or Vickers E.F.B.2. This was a two-bay biplane powered by a single 80 hp (60 kW) Gnome Monosoupape nine-cylinder rotary engine; the aircraft had a steel tube structure, with fabric-covered wings and tail, and a duralumin-covered nacelle with large celluloid windows in the sides. The unequal-span wings were unstaggered, with lateral control by wing warping, while the aircraft had a large semi-circular tailplane. Armament remained a single Vickers gun mounted in the nose of the nacelle, with limited movement possible, and a very poor view for the gunner. The E.F.B.2 made its first flight at Brooklands on 26 November 1913. It was soon followed by the E.F.B.3, powered by a similar engine, but using ailerons instead of wing warping, and with equal-span wings, while the nacelle omitted the large windows fitted to the E.F.B.2.

The belt-fed machine gun proved problematic, and the weapon was changed to the lighter, handier, drum-fed .303 in (7.7 mm) Lewis gun.

The F.B.5 first flew on 17 July 1914. It was powered by a single 100 hp (75 kW) Gnome Monosoupape nine-cylinder rotary engine driving a two-bladed propeller, and was of simple, clean, and conventional design compared with its predecessors.

=== F.B.6 ===
The Vickers F.B.6 was a development of the F.B.5 with an increased span on the upper wing. Only one was built.

=== F.B.9 ===
A further development of the F.B.5, the Vickers F.B.9, had a more streamlined nacelle and an improved ring mounting (either Vickers or Scarff) for the Lewis gun. Fifty were delivered to Royal Flying Corps training units. A few served in some F.E.2b squadrons while they were waiting for their new aircraft between late 1915 and early 1916.

== Operational history ==
The first F.B.5 was delivered to No. 6 Squadron of the Royal Flying Corps (RFC) at Netheravon in November 1914. On 25 December the first use of the F.B.5 in action took place, when F.B.5 No. 664 took off from Joyce Green airfield to engage a German Taube monoplane, hitting the Taube (and possibly causing its loss) with incendiary bullets from a carbine after the Lewis gun jammed. Eighteen days later, the same flight crew, Second Lieutenants M. R. Chidson and D. C. W. Sanders, flying the first F.B.5 in France, No. 1621, were forced to land behind German lines, and the new plane fell into enemy hands.

The F.B.5 began to be seen on the Western Front when the first reached No.2 Squadron RFC on 5 February 1915. The type served in ones and twos with several other units before No. 11 Squadron RFC became the world's first fighter squadron when, fully equipped with the F.B.5, it deployed to Villers-Bretonneux, France on 25 July 1915. Second Lieutenant G.S.M. Insall of 11 Squadron won the Victoria Cross for an action on 7 November 1915 in which he destroyed a German aircraft while flying a Gunbus. No. 18 Squadron RFC, which deployed to France in November 1915, also operated the F.B.5 exclusively.

Early aircraft were fitted with British-built Monosoupapes, which initially proved less reliable than French-built engines, while much work was done before a useful gun mounting became available. Although its forward-firing machine gun was a great advantage, the F.B.5 was relatively slow. German pilots often used the superior speed of their aircraft to avoid combat however this was still useful as it cleared the sky of enemy planes. Only the single pilot/observer team of Lionel Rees and James McKinley Hargreaves became aces while flying this type.

It never pretended to be capable of setting speed or height records. It was quite happy bumbling along above the German Army, booming it its sonorous defiance for all to hear and never evading a trial of strength.

— Lt A.J Insall (F.B.5 Observer)

By the end of 1915, the aircraft was outclassed by the Fokker Eindecker. Examples of the improved Vickers F.B.9 were sent to France, pending sufficient supplies of the Royal Aircraft Factory F.E.2b however both the F.B.5 and F.B.9 were fully withdrawn from frontline service by July 1916. Remaining examples, in British service, were mostly used as trainers.

12 F.B.5s were built under license in Denmark. These were completed in 1916 and remained in service with the Danish Army Air Corps until their retirement in 1924.

=== Legacy ===
The Vickers company persisted with an active experimental program during the First World War period, including a line of single-seat pusher fighters that culminated in the Vickers F.B.26 Vampire of 1917–18, but the F.B.5 remained their only significant production aircraft until the Vickers Vimy bomber, which entered service too late to affect the war.

Vickers F.B.5 had a lasting legacy as German pilots continued to refer to British pusher aircraft as "Vickers-types". Many victories over D.H.2 or F.E.2b pushers were reported as destruction of a "Vickers".

A flying replica of the F.B.5 Gunbus was completed in 1966 and flew until late 1968. It is now (2014) an exhibit at the Royal Air Force Museum at Hendon near London.

== Variants ==
E.F.B.2 (Vickers Type 18)
Single-engined two-seat fighter prototype powered by 100 hp (75 kW) Gnome Monosoupape rotary engine. It had a slight overhang on upper wings and wing warping controls. Its nacelle was fitted with large celluloid windows and was armed with a single Vickers machine gun. One built.
E.F.B.3 (Vickers Type 18B)
Revised fighter, with equal-span wings, aileron controls and revised nacelle without windows. One built.
E.F.B.4
Proposed design of similar layout to "Destroyer" - unbuilt.
E.F.B.5
Further improved development of E.F.B.3. Six built for RFC and RNAS.

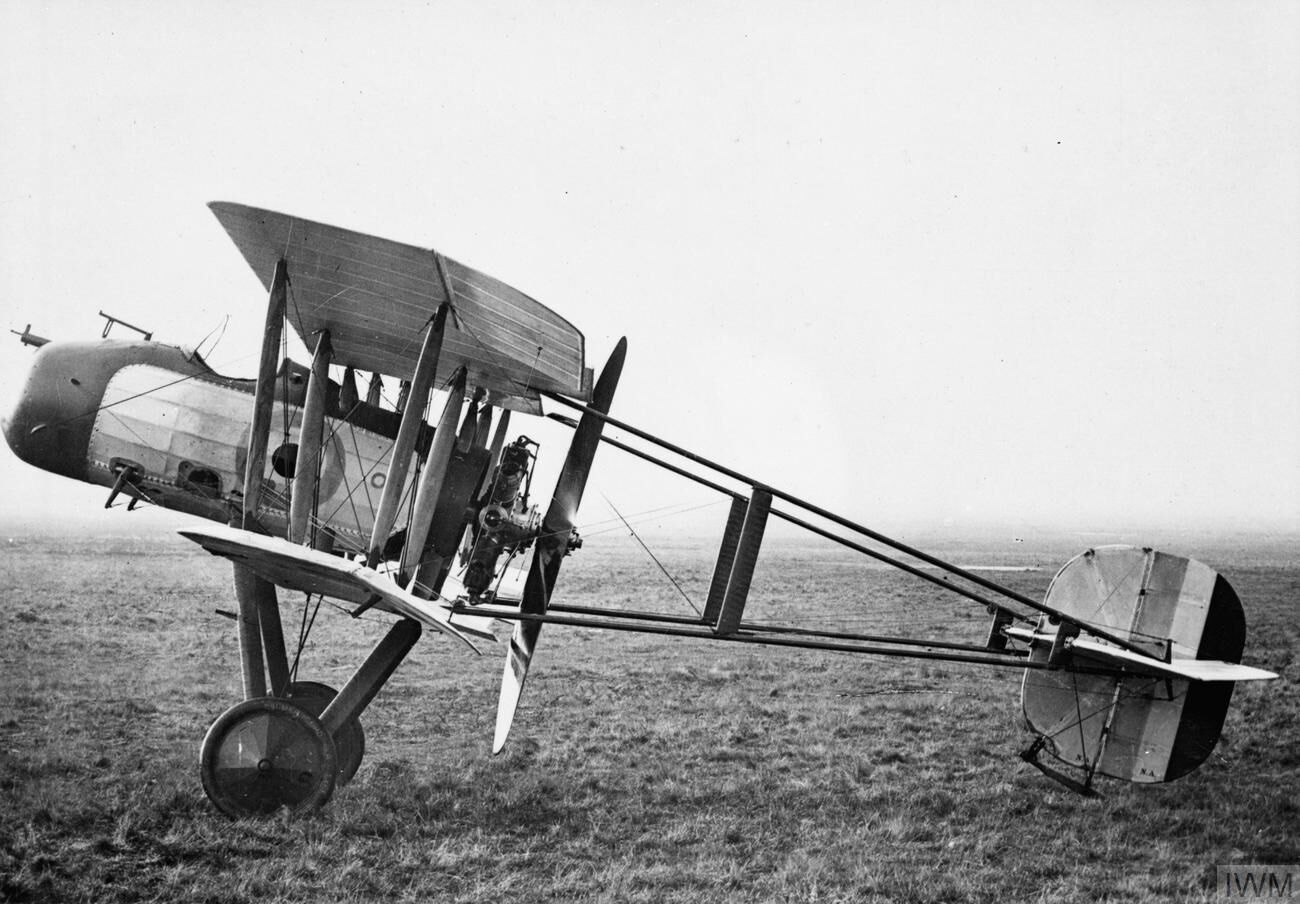
Bombay (2), an F.B.5a

F.B.5
Production version of E.F.B.5 with rectangular tail surfaces. At least 120 built by Vickers, with 75 built by Darracq in France and 12 by the Tøjhusvoerkstedt (Danish Arsenal Workshops), giving a total of at least 207.
F.B.6
Pre-production aircraft, differing from E.F.B.5 by having revised unequal span wings with large overhang and ailerons only on upper wing. One built.
F.B.9
Improved derivative of F.B.5, with revised wings and tail, more streamlined nacelle, a new V-type undercarriage and using streamlined Rafwire bracing instead of conventional cable bracing. 95 built by Vickers and 24 by Darracq, giving 119 in total.
F.B.10
Proposed development with 100 hp (75 kW) Isotta Fraschini engine. Unbuilt.
S.B.1
1914 design for dual control trainer based on E.F.B.3 and powered by 100 hp (75 kW) Anzani radial engine. Unbuilt.

== Operators ==
Denmark

- Danish Army Air Corps, Operated 12 license built aircraft from 1916–1924.

United Kingdom

- Royal Flying Corps
  - No. 2 Squadron RFC
  - No. 5 Squadron RFC
  - No. 7 Squadron RFC
  - No. 11 Squadron RFC
  - No. 16 Squadron RFC
  - No. 18 Squadron RFC
  - No. 24 Squadron RFC
  - No. 25 Squadron RFC
  - No. 32 Squadron RFC
  - No. 35 Squadron RFC
  - No. 41 Squadron RFC

== Specifications (Vickers F.B.5) ==
Data from Vickers Aircraft since 1908

General characteristics

- Crew: Two, pilot & observer/gunner
- Length: 27 ft 2 in (8.28 m)
- Wingspan: 36 ft 6 in (11.13 m)
- Height: 11 ft 0 in (3.35 m)
- Wing area: 382 sq ft (35.5 m^{2})
- Empty weight: 1,220 lb (553 kg)
- Gross weight: 2,050 lb (930 kg)
- Powerplant: 1 × Gnome Monosoupape 9-cylinder rotary engine, 100 hp (75 kW)

Performance

- Maximum speed: 70 mph (110 km/h, 61 kn) at 5,000 ft (1,500 m)
- Range: 250 mi (400 km, 220 nmi)
- Endurance: 4 hours 30 minutes
- Service ceiling: 9,000 ft (2,700 m)
- Time to altitude: 16 min to 5,000 ft (1,500 m)

Armament

- Guns: 1 × 0.303 in (7.7 mm) drum-fed Lewis gun in observer's cockpit

== See also ==
Related development

- Vickers E.F.B.1

Aircraft of comparable role, configuration, and era

- Royal Aircraft Factory F.E.2
- Airco DH.1

Related lists

- List of aircraft of the Royal Flying Corps
