= Lionel Rees =

Royal Air Force officer and recipient of the Victoria Cross

Lionel Wilmot Brabazon Rees
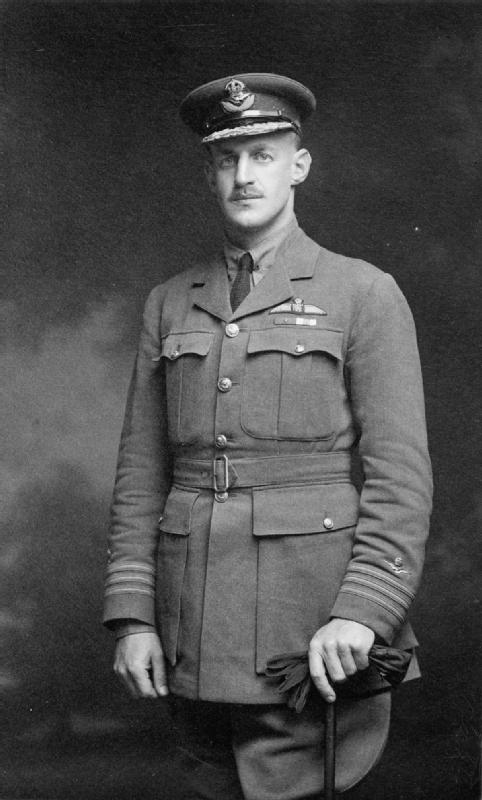
- Lionel Rees c.1918
- Born: 31 July 1884; Caernarfon, Carnarvonshire, Wales
- Died: 28 September 1955 (aged 71); Nassau, Bahamas
- Burial place: Nassau War Cemetery, Bahamas
- Military career
- Allegiance: United Kingdom
- Branch: British Army; Royal Air Force
- Service years: 1902–1931 c. 1939–1942
- Rank: Group Captain
- Units: Royal Garrison Artillery; Royal Flying Corps
- Commands: No. 11 Squadron RFC; No. 32 Squadron RFC
- Conflicts: First World War: Western Front; Battle of the Somme; Second World War
- Awards: Victoria Cross; Officer of the Order of the British Empire; Military Cross; Air Force Cross; Mentioned in Despatches

Group Captain Lionel Wilmot Brabazon Rees, VC, OBE, MC, AFC (31 July 1884 – 28 September 1955) was a Welsh aviator, flying ace, and a recipient of the Victoria Cross, the highest award for gallantry in the face of the enemy that can be awarded to British and Commonwealth forces. He was credited with eight confirmed aerial victories, comprising one enemy aircraft captured, one destroyed, one "forced to land" and five "driven down". Rees and his gunner, Flight Sergeant James McKinley Hargreaves, were the only two airmen to become aces flying the earliest purpose-built British fighter aeroplane, the Vickers Gunbus.

Rees also had a keen interest in archaeology. While flying from Cairo to Baghdad in the 1920s, he took some of the earliest archaeological aerial photographs of sites in eastern Transjordan (now Jordan), and published several articles in Antiquity and the journal of the Palestine Exploration Fund. He is considered a father of the archaeological studies of this remote area, and a pioneer of aerial archaeology. He was also an accomplished sailor.

== Early life and education ==
Rees was born at 5 Castle Street, Caernarfon, on 31 July 1884, the son of Charles Herbert Rees, a solicitor and honorary colonel in the Royal Welch Fusiliers, and his wife Leonara. Rees attended Eastbourne College before entering the Royal Military Academy at Woolwich in 1902.

Rees was commissioned on 23 December 1903 into the Royal Garrison Artillery and was posted to Gibraltar. Promoted to lieutenant in 1906, he moved to Sierra Leone in 1908 and in May 1913 was seconded to the Southern Nigeria Regiment.

== First World War ==
Rees was commissioned as an officer in the Royal Garrison Artillery, a branch of the Royal Regiment of Artillery. In 1912, Rees learned to fly at his own expense, receiving his Aviator's Certificate (no. 392) in January 1913. By 1913–14, Rees was attached to the West African Frontier Force when he was seconded to the Royal Flying Corps in August 1914, initially as an instructor at Upavon, he was promoted to captain in October 1914. In early 1915 he took command of the newly formed No. 11 Squadron at Netheravon and in July they moved to France. He first saw action flying the Vickers Gunbus with No. 11 Squadron in mid-1915, earning a reputation as an aggressive pilot and an above average marksman.

=== Military Cross ===
Rees was awarded the Military Cross for his actions in 1915, gazetted as follows:

For conspicuous gallantry and skill on several occasions, notably the following: —

On 21st September, 1915, when flying a machine with one machine gun, accompanied by Flight-Sergeant Hargreaves, he sighted a large German biplane with two machine guns 2,000 feet below him. He spiralled down and dived at the enemy, who, having the faster machine, manoeuvred to get him broadside on and then opened heavy fire. Despite this, Captain Rees pressed his attack and apparently succeeded in hitting the enemy's engine, for the machine made a quick turn, glided some distance and finally fell just inside the German lines near Herbecourt.

On 28 July he attacked and drove down a hostile monoplane despite the main spar of his machine having been shot through and the rear spar shattered. On 31 August, accompanied by Flight-Sergeant Hargreaves, he fought a German machine more powerful than his own for three-quarters of an hour, then returned for more ammunition and went out to the attack again, finally bringing the enemy's machine down apparently wrecked.

— The London Gazette, 29 October 1915

By this time he had claimed one aircraft captured, one destroyed, one "forced to land" and five "driven down".

Rees returned to England at the end of 1915, where he took command of the Central Flying School Flight at Upavon. In June 1916 he took No. 32 Squadron to France.

=== Victoria Cross ===
Rees was 31 years old and on detached service from the Royal Garrison Artillery to the Royal Flying Corps on Flying Duties as a temporary major in No. 32 Squadron when the following deed took place for which he was awarded the VC.

In the first hours of the Somme Offensive, Rees was on patrol, taking off in Airco DH.2 No. 6015 at 0555 hours. His attempt to join a formation of "British" machines brought an attack from one of the Germans. He shot up the attacker, hitting its fuselage between the two aircrew. As it dived away, Rees attacked a Roland. Long range fire from three other Germans did not discourage Rees from closing on it; it emitted a hazy cloud of smoke from its engine from the 30 rounds Rees fired into it and it fled. Rees then single-handedly went after five more Germans. A bullet in the thigh paralysed his leg, forcing him to temporarily break off his assault. As the shock of the wound wore off, he was able to pursue the German formation leader, which was leaving after dropping its bomb. He fired his Lewis machine gun empty. In frustration, he drew his pistol but dropped it into his DH.2's nacelle. Meanwhile, the German two-seater pulled away above him. The German formation was shattered and scattered.

Rees gave up the futile chase, and returned to base. Once landed, he calmly asked for steps so he could deplane. Once seated on the aerodrome grass, he had a tender fetched to take him to hospital. The valour of his actions earned him the Victoria Cross. Its citation reads:

On 1 July 1916 at Double Crassieurs, France, Major Rees, whilst on flying duties, sighted what he thought was a bombing party of our machines returning home, but were in fact enemy aircraft. Major Rees was attacked by one of them, but after a short encounter it disappeared, damaged. The others then attacked him at long range, but he dispersed them, seriously damaging two of the machines. He chased two others but was wounded in the thigh, temporarily losing control of his aircraft. He righted it and closed with the enemy, using up all his ammunition, firing at very close range. He then returned home, landing his aircraft safely.

He convalesced for a while due to his injuries from the 1 July action, and went on a War Office mission to the United States, becoming a temporary lieutenant colonel in May 1917. For the remainder of hostilities Rees commanded a School of Aerial Fighting based at RAF Turnberry.

== Post-war career ==
On 2 November 1918 Rees was awarded the Air Force Cross in recognition of valuable flying services. In 1919, Rees was appointed an Officer of the Order of the British Empire. On 1 August 1919 he resigned his commission with the Royal Garrison Artillery and took a permanent commission in the newly formed Royal Air Force as a lieutenant-colonel. In 1920, Rees was presented with a sword and the freedom of Caernarfon.

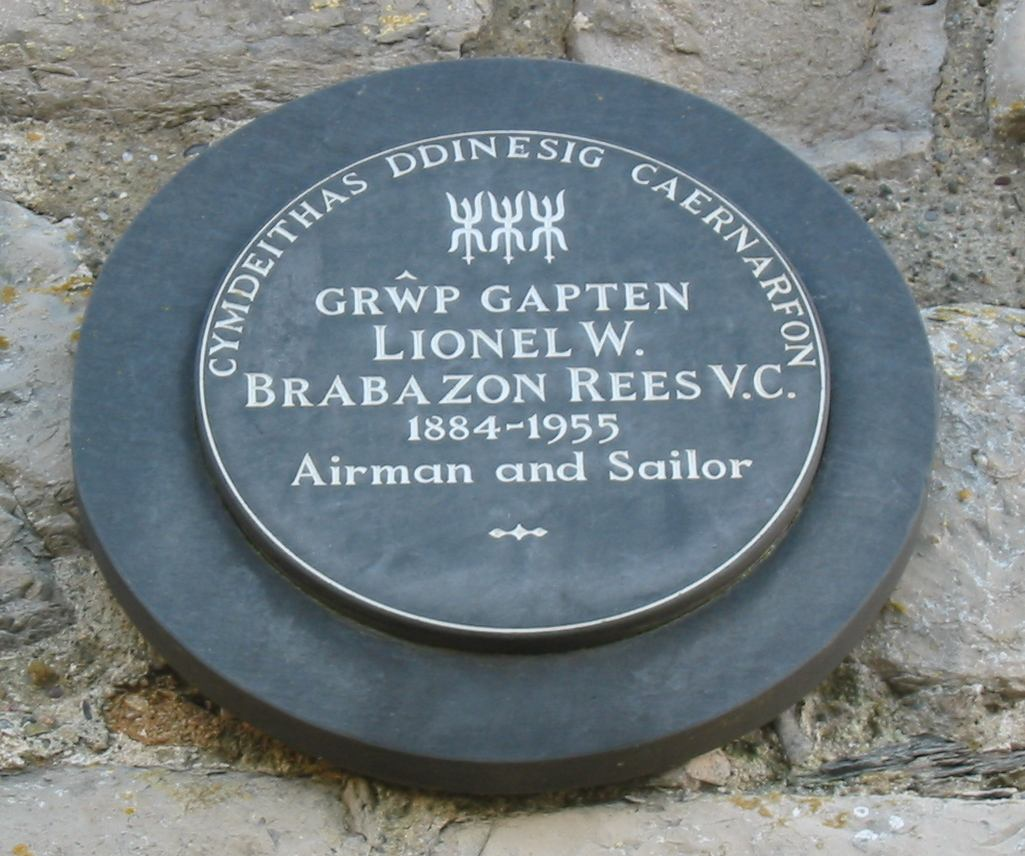
Plaque honouring Rees in Caernarfon

In June 1920, he took command of the flying wing at RAF College Cranwell, becoming the assistant commandant in March 1923. Promoted to group captain after the RAF moved away from the Army rank structure, Rees became deputy director in the Air Ministry directorate of training and in January 1925 he became an additional air aide-de-camp to the King.

Rees was posted to RAF Amman in May 1926 and given command of the RAF Transjordan and Palestine in October 1926. He had a keen interest in archaeology, and while flying on the Cairo to Baghdad route during this period, he took some of the earliest archaeological aerial photographs of sites in eastern Transjordan (now Jordan), and published several articles in Antiquity and the journal of the Palestine Exploration Fund. He is considered a father of the archaeological studies of this remote area, and a pioneer of aerial archaeology.

Rees returned to England in October 1926 to take command of the RAF Depot at Uxbridge before he retired from the RAF in 1931 with the rank of group captain. In 1933, he sailed single-handedly across the Atlantic from Wales to Nassau in the Bahamas in a ketch. For this achievement he was awarded the prestigious Blue Water Medal by the Cruising Club of America in 1934.

When the Second World War broke out, Rees returned to the United Kingdom from the Bahamas and once again joined the RAF. He relinquished his rank of group captain in January 1941 at his own request and was granted the rank of wing commander. He served in Africa. On 21 November 1942 Rees reverted to the rank of group captain on the retired list.

Rees returned home to the Bahamas and, on 12 August 1947, aged 62, he married Sylvia Williams, a young local woman. They had three children.

== Death and legacy ==
Rees died at the Princess Margaret Hospital in Nassau on 28 September 1955 from leukaemia. He was buried at Nassau war cemetery. Described as a real gentleman, during his time in Transjordan and possibly during other parts of his career, Rees was known to give his pay to service charities.

An RAF BAe 146 jet of No. 32 Squadron was named in his honour on 21 June 2019.

Rees' grandson is the swimmer, Nicholas Rees.

== Selected publications ==
Rees wrote under the name 'L. W. B. Rees'.

- 1916: Fighting in the Air
- 1927: 'Ancient Reservoirs near Kasr Azrak'
- 1929: 'The Transjordan Desert'
- 1930: 'Transjordan: an ancient and a modern raid'
- 1948: 'The Route of the Exodus: The First Stage, Ramies to Etham'
