= John Quested (officer) =

British WWI flying ace

John Bowley Quested
- Born: 14 December 1893; Elham, Kent, England
- Died: 11 March 1948 (aged 54)
- Burial place: St Martin's Church, Cheriton, Kent
- Military career
- Allegiance: United Kingdom
- Branch: British Army; Royal Air Force
- Service years: 1914–1920
- Rank: Major
- Units: Army Service Corps; No. 11 Squadron RFC; No. 48 Squadron RFC; No. 40 Squadron RFC
- Commands: No. 1 Aerial Gunnery Range; No. 2 Aeroplane Supply Depot; No. 79 Squadron RAF
- Awards: Military Cross; Croix de Guerre (France)

Major John Bowley Quested MC (14 December 1893 – 11 March 1948) was a First World War flying ace from England. He was credited with eight aerial victories, the most notable being his triumph over Gustav Leffers.

== World War I service ==
Quested was commissioned as a temporary second lieutenant in the Army Service Corps on 11 November 1914. In April 1915, he began flying as an observer/gunner in 11 Squadron of the Royal Flying Corps, and was promoted to lieutenant on 1 December 1915.

On 6 July 1916 he was appointed a flying officer, and transferred to the General List, to become a pilot of the Royal Aircraft Factory FE.2bs of 11 Squadron. He scored his first aerial victory on 16 August 1916, driving a Roland C two-seater reconnaissance biplane down out of control over Fampoux. On 2 September, he repeated and doubled the feat, driving down two Rolands over Bapaume. On the 15th, he destroyed another enemy fighter aircraft in the same area, the same day as being appointed a flight commander with the rank of captain. A week later, on 22 September, he became an ace by shooting down and destroying an Aviatik C two-seater over Longeast Wood.

On 20 December 1916, Quested drove an Albatros D.I down out of control over Monchy-le-Preux, and a week later, on the 27th, he supposedly destroyed another over Wancourt, killing the pilot. However, his observer identified it as a Nieuport 16; it seems a captured French aircraft was being used against them. This seventh victim of Quested was German ace Gustav Leffers. In turn, about an hour later, Quested was forced down behind British lines by another German ace, Wilhelm Cymera.

On 27 January 1917, he drove down an opposing fighter over Beaurains for his eighth victory; his final tally was three enemy planes destroyed and five driven down. On 13 February, he was awarded the Military Cross, his citation reading:

Temporary Captain John Bowley Quested, RFC.
For conspicuous gallantry in action. He manoeuvred his machine with great skill, and thereby enabled his observer to bring down a hostile machine. He has on many previous occasions displayed great courage and ability.

The Croix de Guerre from France followed on 1 May 1917. A crash in July 1917 ended Quested's flying career, although he continued to serve in non-flying command positions for the duration of the war. He was appointed a squadron commander with the rank of major on 27 October 1917, and was commander of No. 1 Aerial Gunnery Range. He was wounded in February 1918, and after recovering commanded No. 2 Aeroplane Supply Depot until the end of the war.

== Postwar ==
Quested reputedly served in Germany and India. Differing reports have him commanding 79 Squadron in 1919, or serving in 48 Squadron in Quetta that same year. He eventually left the RAF, being transferred to the unemployed list on 18 March 1920, and retired to East Anglia to farm.

Quested died on 11 March 1948 and is buried alongside his father, John Egerton Quested (1866–1943), in the churchyard of St Martin's Church, Cheriton, Kent.

== Bibliography ==
- Guttman, Jon & Dempsey, Harry (2009). Pusher Aces of World War I. Osprey Publishing. ISBN 978-1-84603-417-6.
