= No. 11 Squadron RAF =

Flying squadron of the Royal Air Force

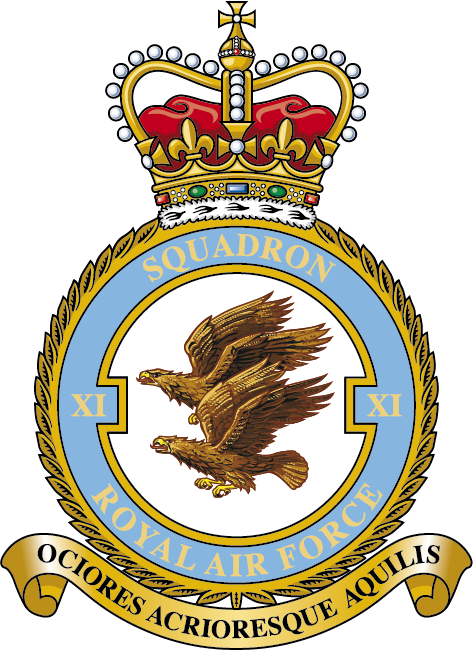
- Squadron badge
- Active: 1915–1918 (RFC); 1918–1919; 1923–1948; 1948–1957; 1959–1966; 1967–2005; 2007–present
- Country: United Kingdom
- Branch: Royal Air Force
- Type: Flying squadron
- Role: Multi–role combat
- Part of: Combat Air Force
- Station: RAF Coningsby
- Mottos: Ociores acrioresque aquilis (Latin for 'Swifter and keener than eagles')
- March: Marching Through Georgia
- Aircraft: Eurofighter Typhoon FGR4

Insignia
- Tail badge

- Roundel
- Tail codes: OY (1939); YH (1939-1943); OM (1948-1950); EX (1950-1951); L (1951-1955); DA-DZ (1988-Current)

No. 11 or XI Squadron (sometimes featuring an 'F' to represent its historic fighter role (No. 11(F) or XI(F) Squadron)), is "the world's oldest, dedicated fighter unit" and continues the traditions established by the similarly numbered Royal Flying Corps squadron, established in 1915. The squadron was reactivated in 2006 to operate the Typhoon F2.

== History ==
=== First World War (1915–1919) ===
No. 11 Squadron of the Royal Flying Corps (RFC) was formed at Netheravon in Wiltshire on 14 February 1915 for "fighting duties", receiving two-seat pusher Vickers F.B.5 Gunbus fighters in June, and deploying to France on 25 July 1915. It was the first squadron solely equipped with fighters to deploy with the RFC, or with any flying service.

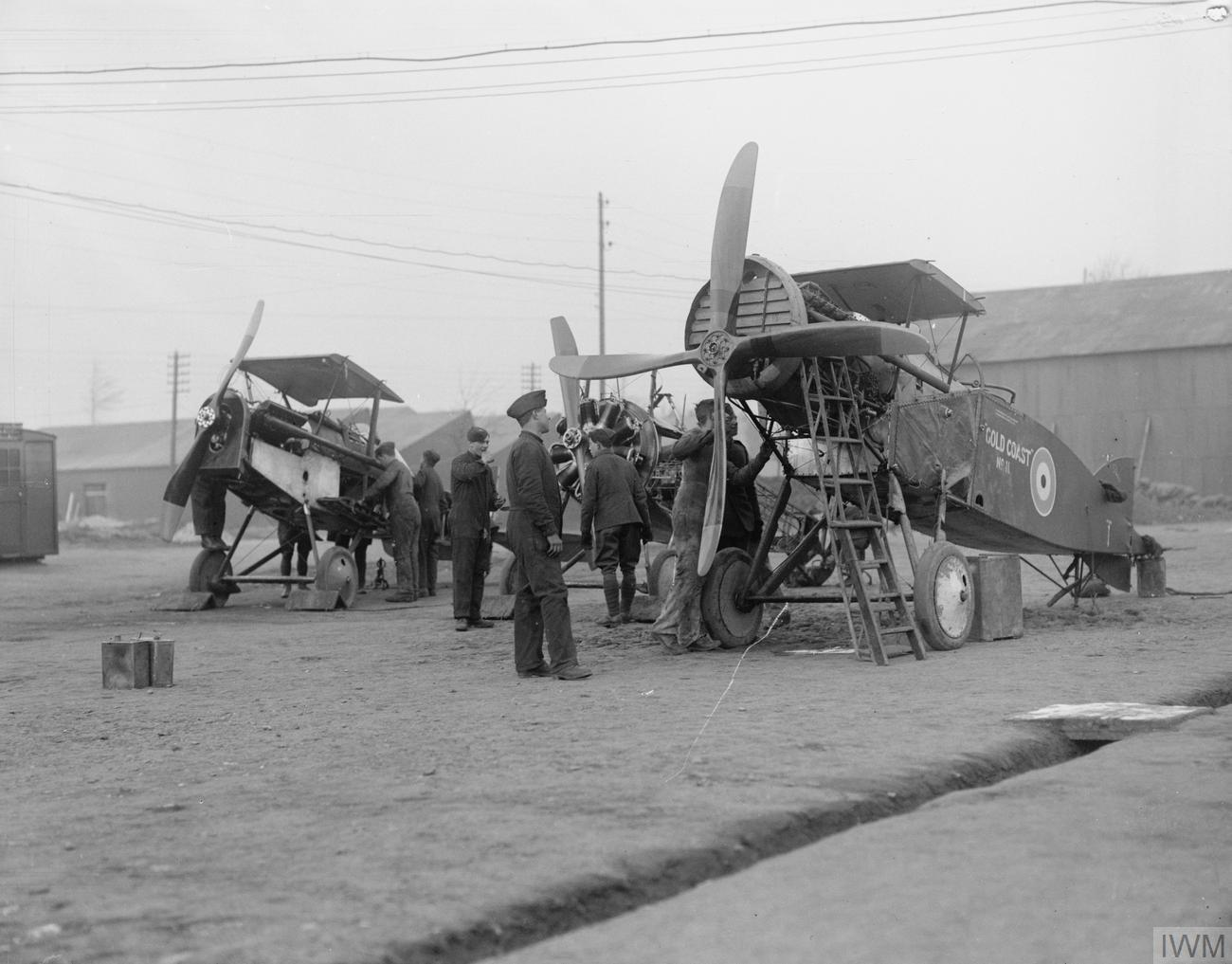
Aircraft at St. Omer, France, 19 December 1917. The aircraft on the right is a Bristol Fighter (thought to belong to No. 11 Squadron) and on the left is a Royal Aircraft Factory S.E.5

The squadron's Gunbusses were soon pressed into service, with Captain Lionel Rees claiming the squadron's first air-to-air victory on 28 July, forcing down a German observation aircraft. Second Lieutenant G. S. M. Insall was awarded a Victoria Cross for an action on 7 November 1915 in which he forced down and destroyed a German Aviatik observation aircraft. The Gunbus was already obsolete however, and was initially supplemented by a mixture of Bristol Scouts and Nieuport 16s until replaced in June 1916 by the Royal Aircraft Factory F.E.2b of similar layout, but slightly higher performance. These in turn were replaced by Bristol F.2 Fighters in August 1917, these being used both for offensive patrols over German-held territory and for ground attack for the remainder of the war. The squadron was disbanded at the end of 1919.

The squadron had nineteen flying aces in its ranks during the war. Among them were Victoria Cross winner Lionel Rees, as well as Andrew Edward McKeever, John Stanley Chick, Eugene Coler, Albert Ball VC, Frederick Libby, Ronald Maudit, John Quested, Herbert Sellars, Donald Beard, Stephen Price and Hugh Hay Thomas Frederick Stephenson.

=== Between the wars (1918–1938) ===
No. 11 Squadron reformed at RAF Andover in Hampshire in January 1923 as a day bomber squadron equipped with the Airco DH.9A, soon moving to RAF Bircham Newton in Norfolk. In April 1924, the DH.9A was replaced by the Fairey Fawn, despite the fact that they offered little improvement in performance over the DH.9A, moving with them to RAF Netheravon in May that year. The unpopular Fawns were replaced by the Hawker Horsley in November 1926, in use until December 1928, when the squadron handed the Horsleys to No. 100 Squadron. The squadron was posted to Risalpur in India (now in Pakistan), flying Westland Wapitis in the army co-operation role and carried out punitive air raids against rebelling tribal forces. The Wapiti was replaced with the Hawker Hart in February 1932, operations continuing as before. On 31 May 1935, an earthquake devastated the city of Quetta and the surrounding area. No. 11 Squadron, along with other RAF squadrons in the region, were used to aid the relief effort following the disaster.

=== Second World War (1939–1945) ===
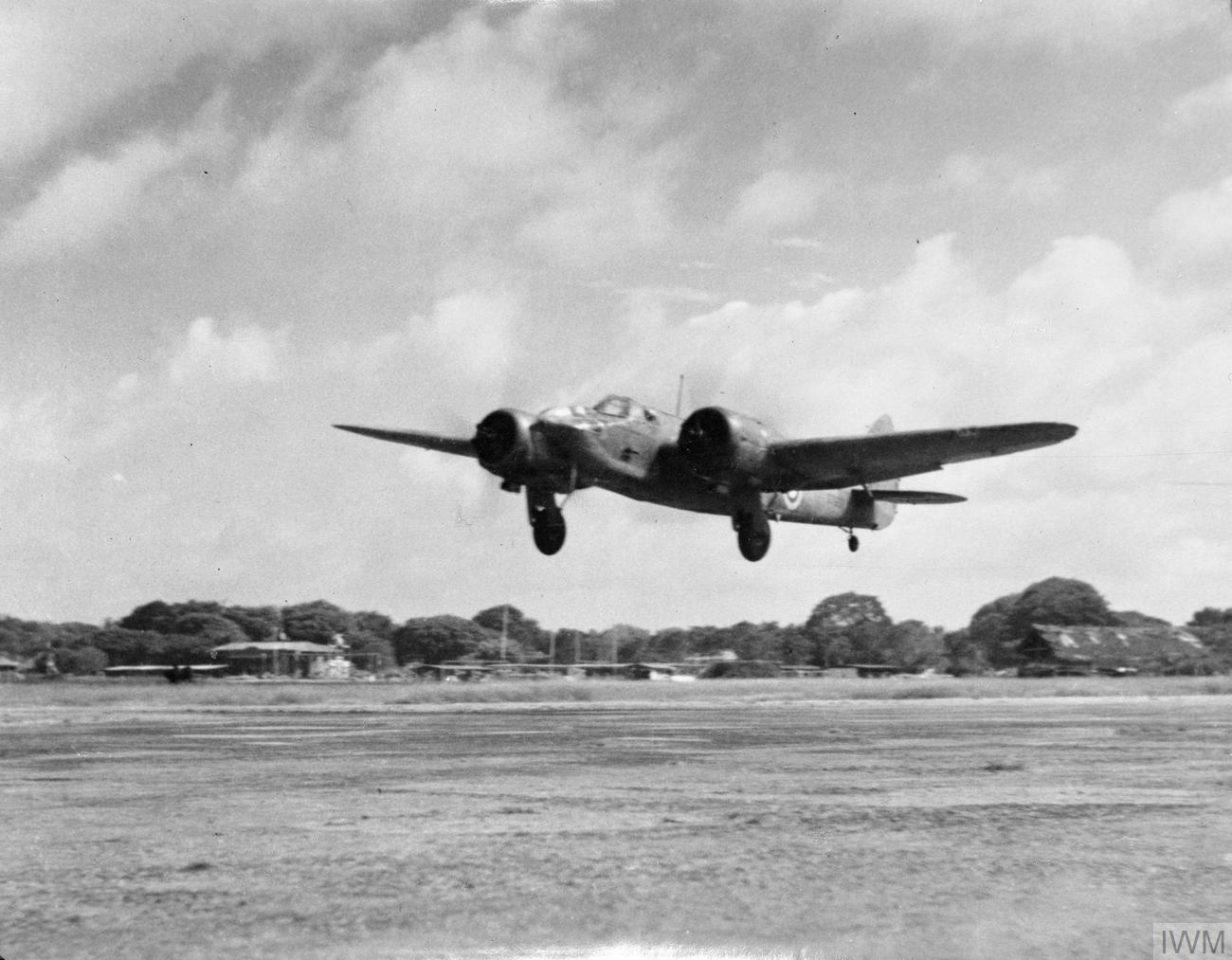
A Bristol Blenheim of No. 11 Squadron takes off from Colombo's racecourse in Ceylon during the Second World War

No. 11 Squadron received Bristol Blenheim Mk.I monoplane bombers in July 1939, moving to Singapore the next month, just before the outbreak of the Second World War in Europe.

In April 1940, the squadron moved to India, and was briefly based at Karachi before it was transferred to Aden due to the increasing likelihood of war with Italy. The first of the squadron's Blenheims reached Aden on 19 June 1940, nine days after Italy declared war on Britain, and flew its first combat mission of the war on 19 June. The squadron was heavily engaged in the early months of the Eastern Africa campaign, attacking Italian targets in Italian East Africa. In December 1940, the squadron moved to Egypt to support the upcoming British offensive in the Western Desert, known as Operation Compass, with the squadron being based at Helwan, near Cairo, with a forward detachment at Fuka to support the offensive.

In January 1941, the squadron reinforced the RAF squadrons in Greece, fighting in the Greek Campaign against the Italians, partly re-equipping with newer the Blenheim Mk.IV from No. 39 Squadron before leaving for Greece, arriving at Larissa on 28 January. On the night of 28 February and 1 March 1941, Larissa was hit by a powerful earthquake, badly damaging both the airfield and the town. Personnel of the Larissa-based squadrons spent the rest of the night rescuing people trapped in collapsed buildings. In March, the squadron joined the newly-established 'E' (Eastern) Wing for operations over Thessaliniki. On 6 April 1941, Germany launched an invasion of Yugoslavia and Greece. The squadron's Blenheims were employed on attacks on columns of German troops in Yugoslavia, but by 16 April, to avoid the German advance the squadron withdrew from Almyros to Acharnes. The few surviving aircraft and crews were evacuated to Crete and then to Egypt. and from there on to Aqir, Palestine where the squadron rebuilt its strength, becoming operational again on 28 May 1941.

After reforming, the squadron served in the Syrian Campaign against the Vichy French, attacking airfields by day and night. On 22 June 1941, the squadron's aircraft bombed and damaged the French destroyer Vauquelin. In August that year the squadron moved to Habbaniya in Iraq, and on 26 August, took part in the Anglo-Soviet operation to secure the Persian oilfields for the Allies, although it only dropped leaflets. After returning to Egypt the squadron took part in Operation Crusader.

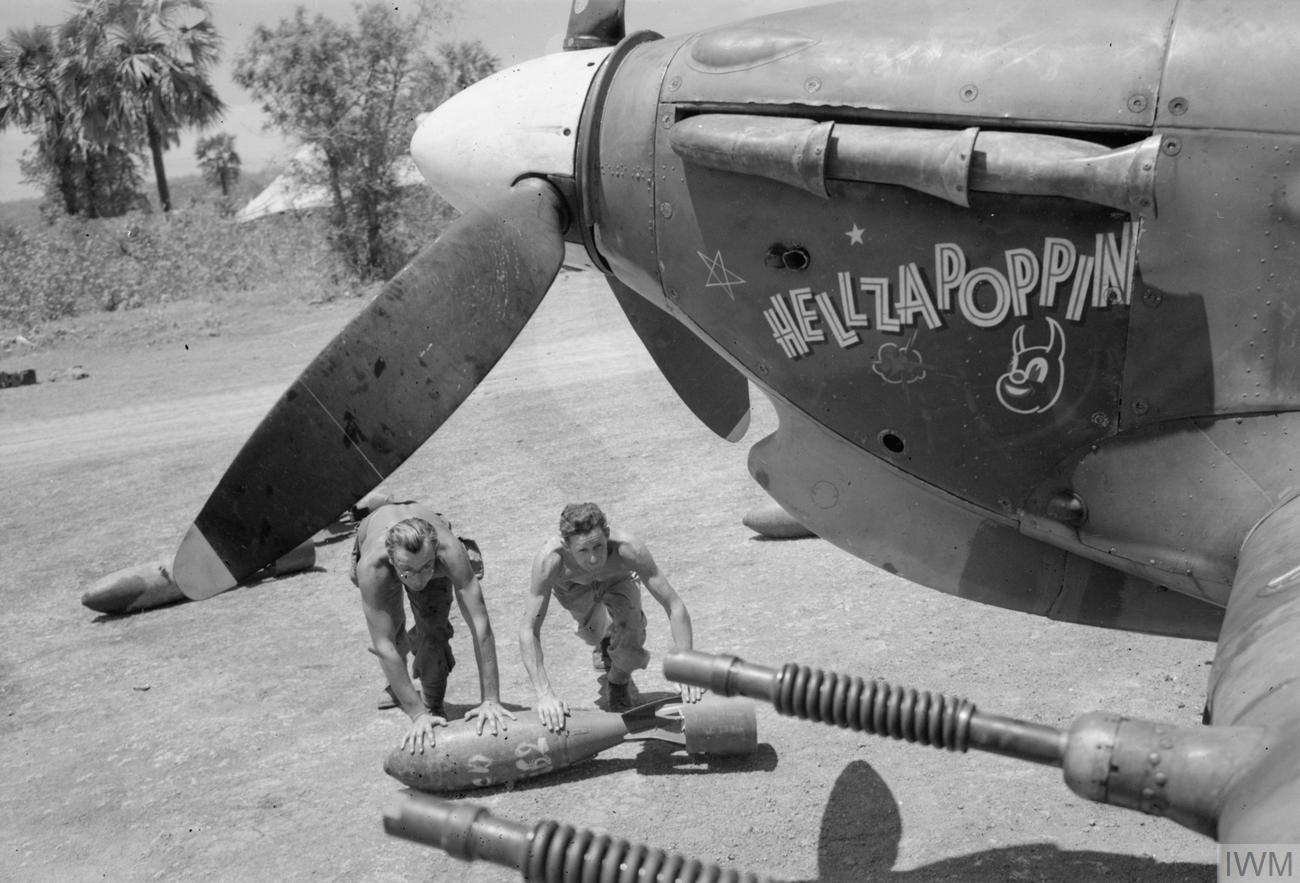
Personnel rolling a 250 lb (110 kg) bomb for loading onto a Hawker Hurricane Mk.IIC of No. 11 Squadron at Sinthe, Burma

Redeployed to Colombo, Ceylon in early 1942, the squadron was involved in attacks on Japanese shipping. During 1943, the squadron re-equipped with the Hawker Hurricane and moved to Burma in the ground attack role, supporting the Fourteenth Army.

By January 1943, Royal Australian Air Force (RAAF) personnel, or Australians serving in the RAF, made up almost 90% of the aircrews in the squadron. This was despite it not officially being an RAAF Article XV squadron. At the time, the Australian personnel included the commanding officer, Wing Commander Harley Stumm.

No. 11 Squadron was one of the few RAF squadrons to fight against Italian, German, Vichy French and Japanese forces.

=== Cold War (1945 onwards) ===
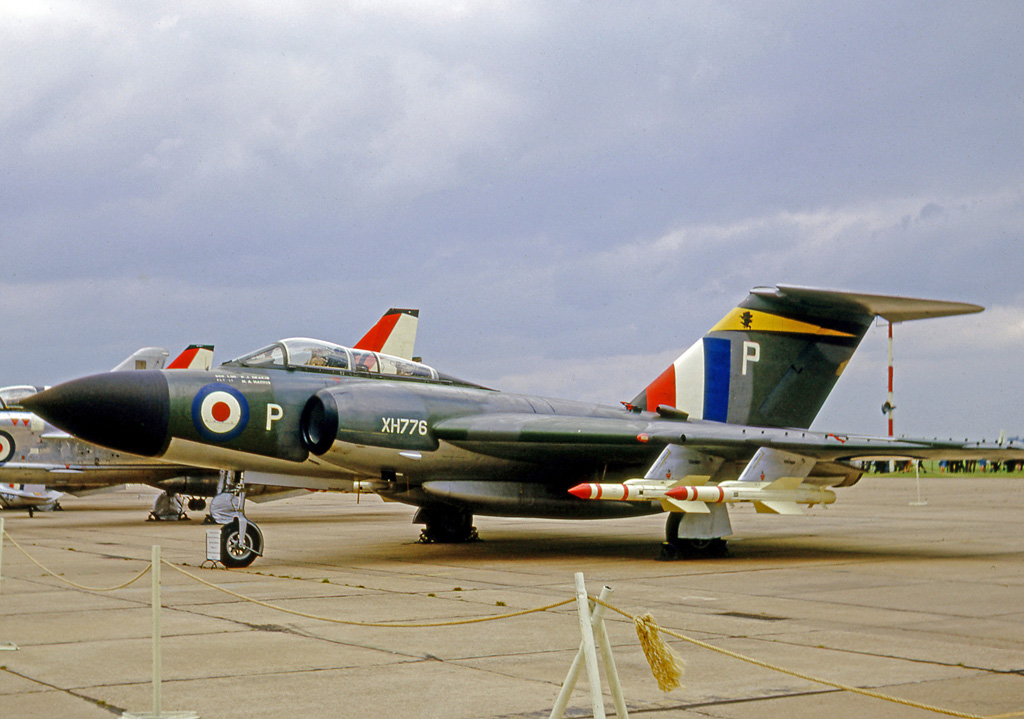
A Gloster Javelin FAW.9 of No. 11 Squadron in 1965

No. 11 Squadron formed part of the occupation forces in Japan from August 1945 to February 1948, when it disbanded. Reforming in Germany during October 1949, they flew the de Havilland Mosquito, de Havilland Vampire and de Havilland Venom. The squadron again disbanded in 1957, but reformed in January 1959 with the Gloster Meteor night fighter. The Gloster Javelin replaced the Meteor a year later when the squadron was based at RAF Geilenkirchen in West Germany. It was equipped with the Javelin until it was disbanded in 1966.

Reforming in early 1967 at RAF Leuchars the squadron spent the next 21 years flying the English Electric Lightning, until June 1988. By that time it was one of the last two squadrons equipped with the Lightning and was based at RAF Binbrook in Lincolnshire.

From August 1988, the squadron operated the twin-seat Panavia Tornado F3 from RAF Leeming.

=== 21st century ===
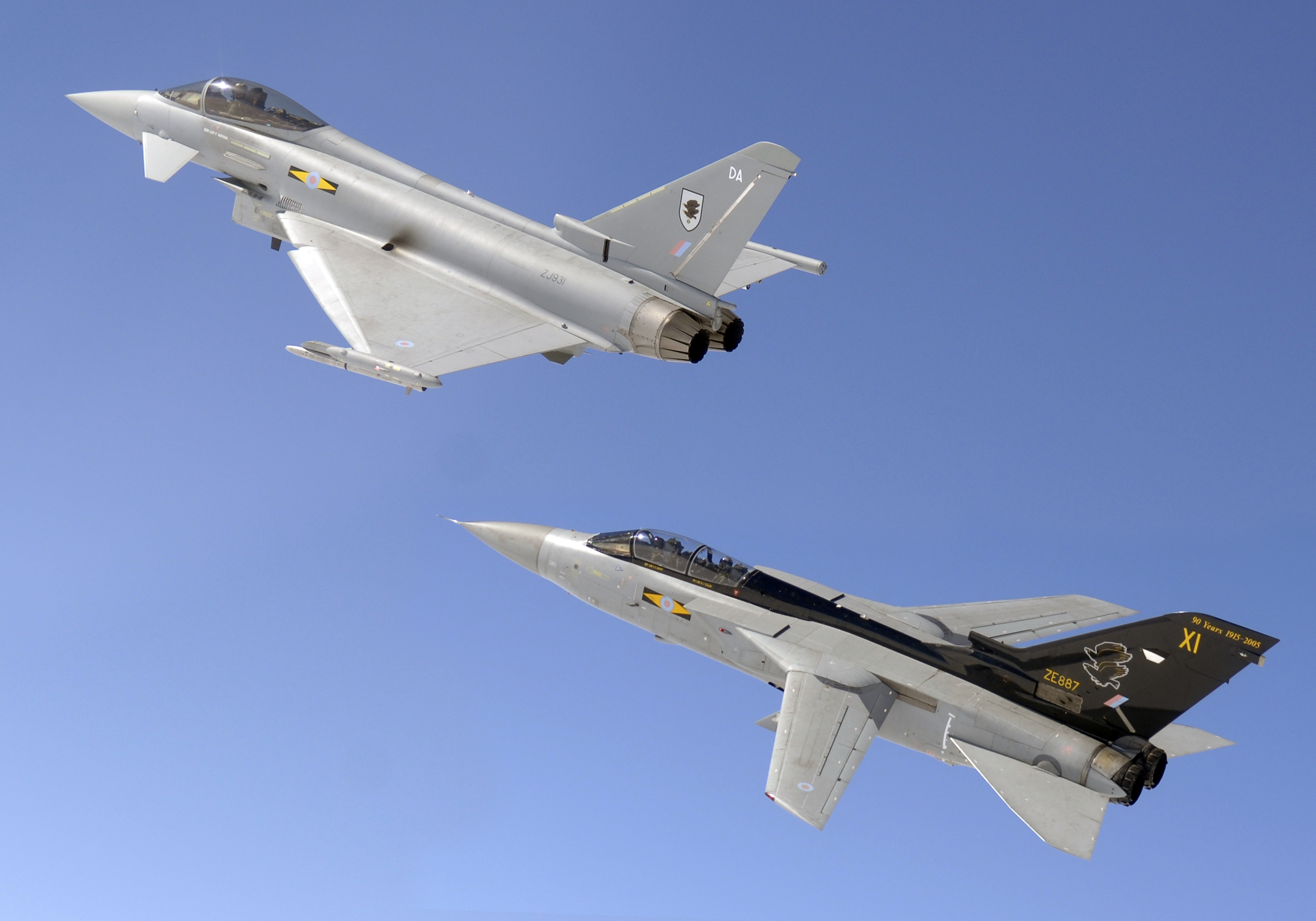
A Eurofighter Typhoon F2 leads a Panavia Tornado F3, both in No. 11 Squadron markings, in 2007

In February 2003, several of No. 11 Squadron's Tornados were modified to carry the ALARM anti-radiation missile (and unofficially designated as the Tornado EF3) to widen their capabilities to include suppression of enemy air defences (SEAD). The squadron disbanded in October 2005 as part of defence reforms following the publication of the Delivering Security in a Changing World: Future Capabilities study by the Ministry of Defence in July 2004.

The RAF announced that No. 11 Squadron would be the second frontline squadron to re-equip with the Eurofighter Typhoon, and would be based at RAF Coningsby; it received its first aircraft in October 2006. The squadron reformed at Coningsby on 29 March 2007, dropping the (F) designation in recognition of its new tasking as the lead Typhoon multi-role squadron.

In March 2011, the squadron deployed to Gioia Del Colle Air Base in Italy, to help police the no-fly zone imposed by UN Security Council Resolution 1973 over Libya as part of Operation Ellamy, assisted by No. 29(R) Squadron personnel and aircraft and further aircraft from No. 3 Squadron. In 2013, the squadron deployed to the Mediterranean again, this time to RAF Akrotiri in Cyprus, as part of No. 121 Expeditionary Air Wing, providing air defence of Cyprus as part of Operation Luminous.

No. 11 Squadron resumed the use of its '(F)' fighter designation during its centenary year, with celebrations taking place on 7 and 8 May 2015 in the form of a formal dinner with the Squadron Association, and a parade with flypast.

During February 2018, the squadron participated in Exercise Red Flag 18-1, the world's largest and most complex air combat exercise run by the US Air Force. For the duration of the exercise the squadron's Typhoons operated from Nellis Air Force Base in Nevada.

During November 2023, the squadron participated in Exercise Ferocious Falcon V, a Qatari led exercise. Six aircraft from the squadron took part in the Exercise Pitch Black 2024 and Exercise Tarang Shakti 2024 hosted by the Royal Australian Air Force and the Indian Air Force, respectively, from July to September 2024.

== Aircraft operated ==
List of aircraft operated by No. 11 Squadron:

- Vickers E.S.1 (1915–1915)
- Vickers FB.5/FB.9 (1915–1916)
- Bristol Scout (1915–1916)
- Nieuport 16/17 (1915–1916)
- Royal Aircraft Factory F.E.2b (1916–1917)
- Bristol F.2b (1917–1919)
- Airco DH.9A (1923–1924)
- Fairey Fawn (1924–1926)
- Hawker Horsley (1926–1928)
- Westland Wapiti (1928–1932)
- Hawker Hart (1932–1939)
- Bristol Blenheim Mk I/Mk IV (1939–1943)
- Hawker Hurricane Mk II (1943–1945)
- Supermarine Spitfire Mk XIV/Mk XVIII (1945–1948)
- de Havilland Mosquito FB.VI (1948–1950)
- de Havilland Vampire FB.5 (1950–1952)
- de Havilland Venom FB.1/FB.4 (1952–1957)
- Gloster Meteor NF.11 (1959–1962)
- Gloster Javelin FAW.4/FAW.5/FAW.9 (1959–1966)
- English Electric Lightning F.3/F.6 (1967–1988)
- Panavia Tornado F3 (1988–2005)
- Eurofighter Typhoon (2007–present)
A selection of aircraft previously operated by No. 11 Squadron
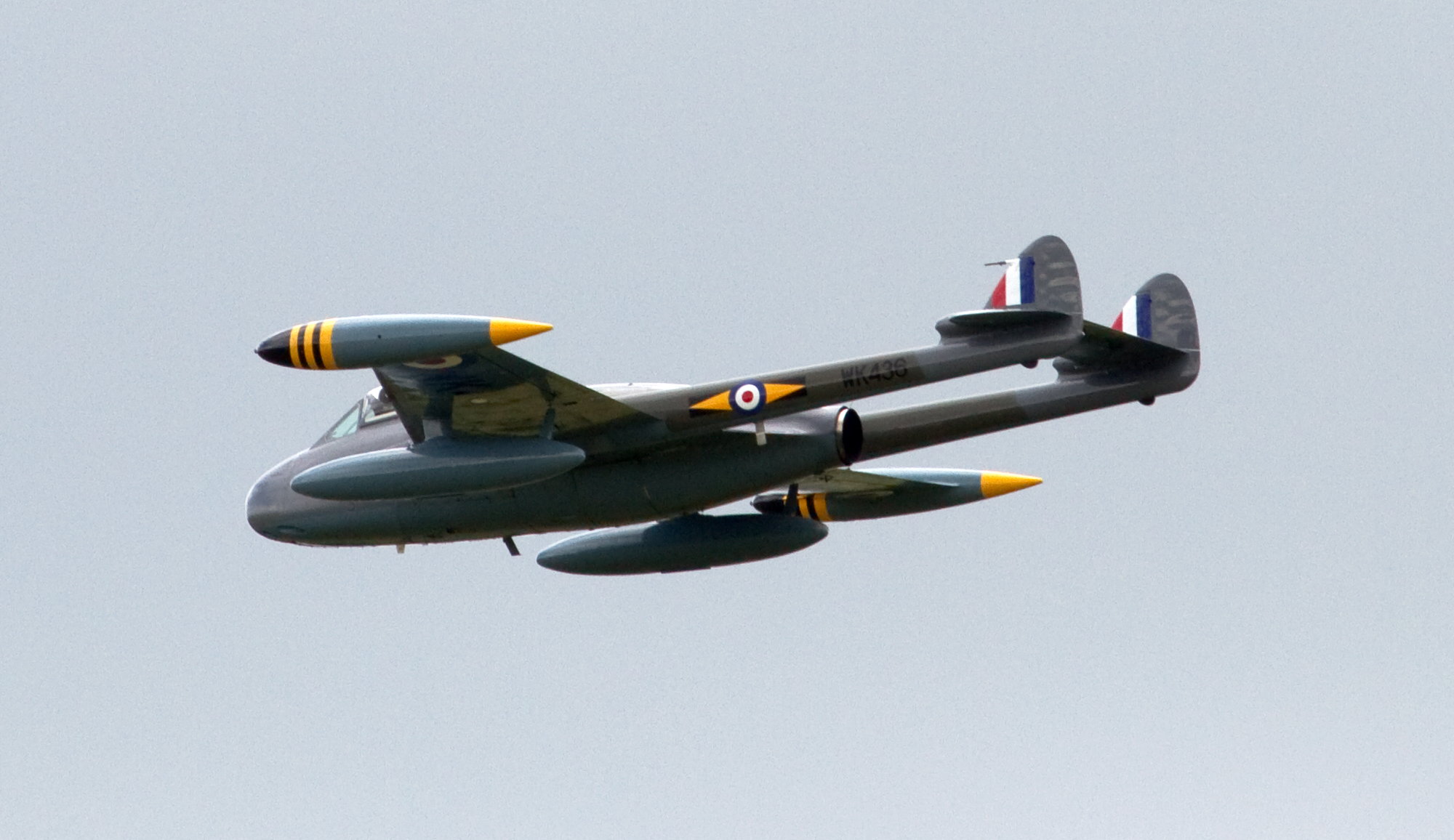
A preserved de Havilland Venom in No. 11 Squadron colours, seen at RAF Cosford in June 2011.

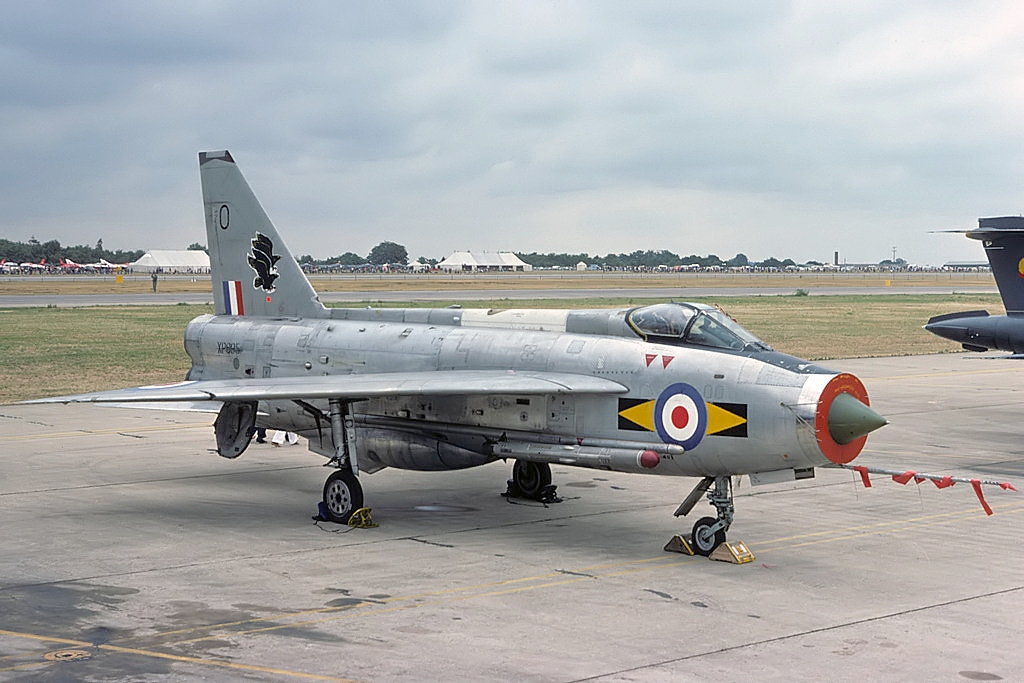
A No. 11 Squadron English Electric Lightning F.3 on display at the 1976 International Air Tattoo at RAF Greenham Common.

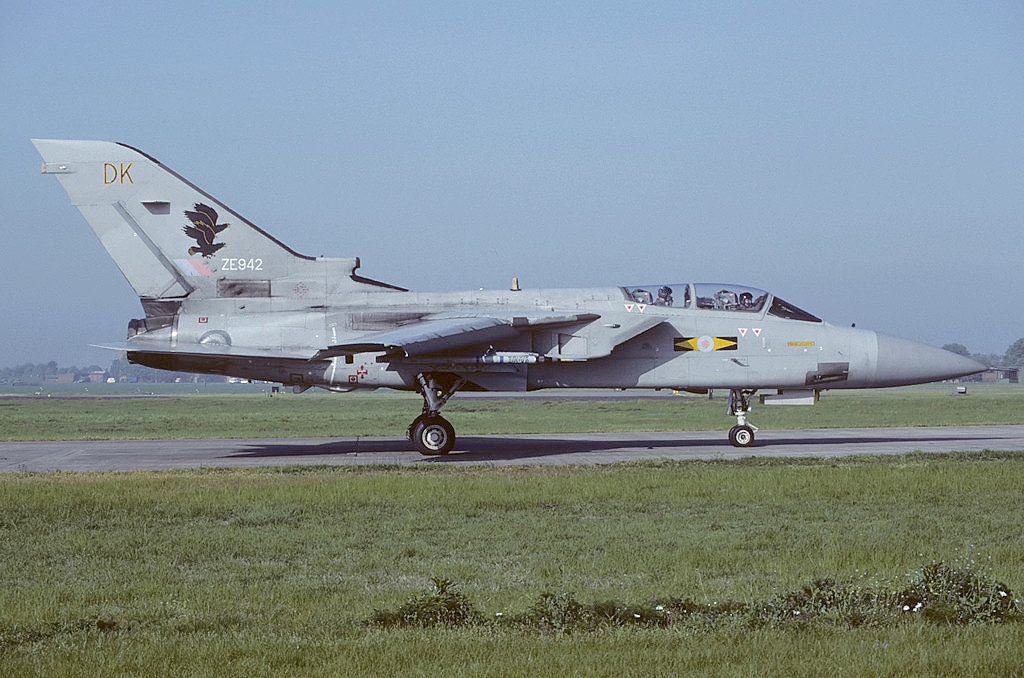
Panavia Tornado F3 in No. 11 Squadron markings, seen at RAF Waddington in 1992.

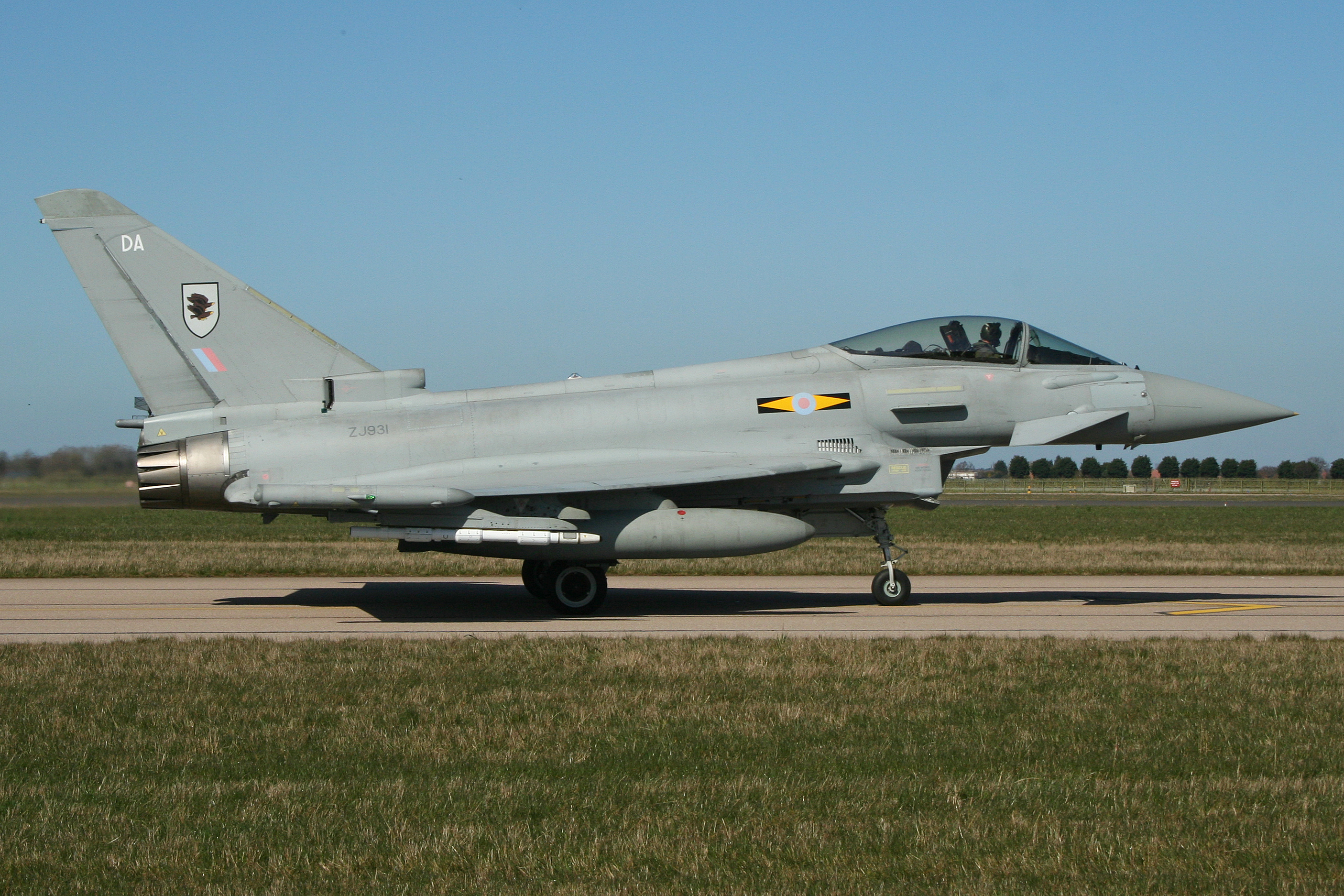
A Eurofighter Typhoon FGR4 of No. 11 Squadron at RAF Coningsby in 2012.

== Heritage ==
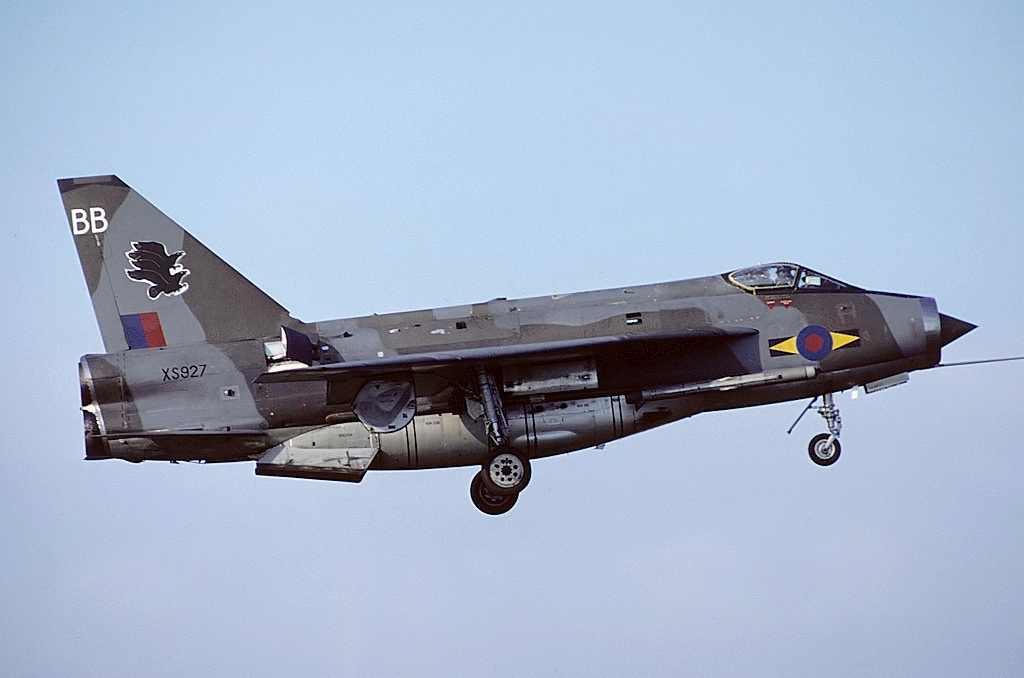
An English Electric Lightning F.6 displaying No.11 Squadron's squadron markings featuring two eagles

=== Badge, motto and song ===
Two eagles in flight are featured on the squadron's badge. The eagles represent speed and strength. There are two birds to reflect the two-seater aircraft which the squadron flew during the First World War. The badge was approved in May 1937.

The squadron's motto is Ociores acrioresque aquilis (Latin for 'Swifter and keener than eagles').

The squadron's song is to the tune of the American Civil War-era Marching Through Georgia.

=== Call signs ===
As of March 2025, aircraft operated by No. 11 Squadron use the following peacetime air traffic control call signs within UK airspace: Havoc, Razor and Tyrant.

== Battle honours ==
No. 11 Squadron has received the following battle honours. Those marked with an asterisk (*) may be emblazoned on the squadron standard.

- Western Front (1915–1918)*
- Loos (1915)*
- Somme (1916)
- Arras (1917)
- Cambrai (1917)*
- Somme (1918)*
- Amiens (1918)*
- Hindenburg Line (1918)*
- North West Frontier (1930–1931)
- North West Frontier (1935–1939)
- East Africa (1940)
- Egypt and Libya (1940–1942)*
- Greece (1941)
- Syria (1941)
- Ceylon (April 1942)
- Arakan (1943–1944)*
- North Burma (1943–1944)*
- Manipur (1944)
- Burma (1944–1945)*
- Libya (2011)

== See also ==
- List of Royal Air Force aircraft squadrons
