= James Enstone =

British flying ace (1895–1963)

Albert James Enstone
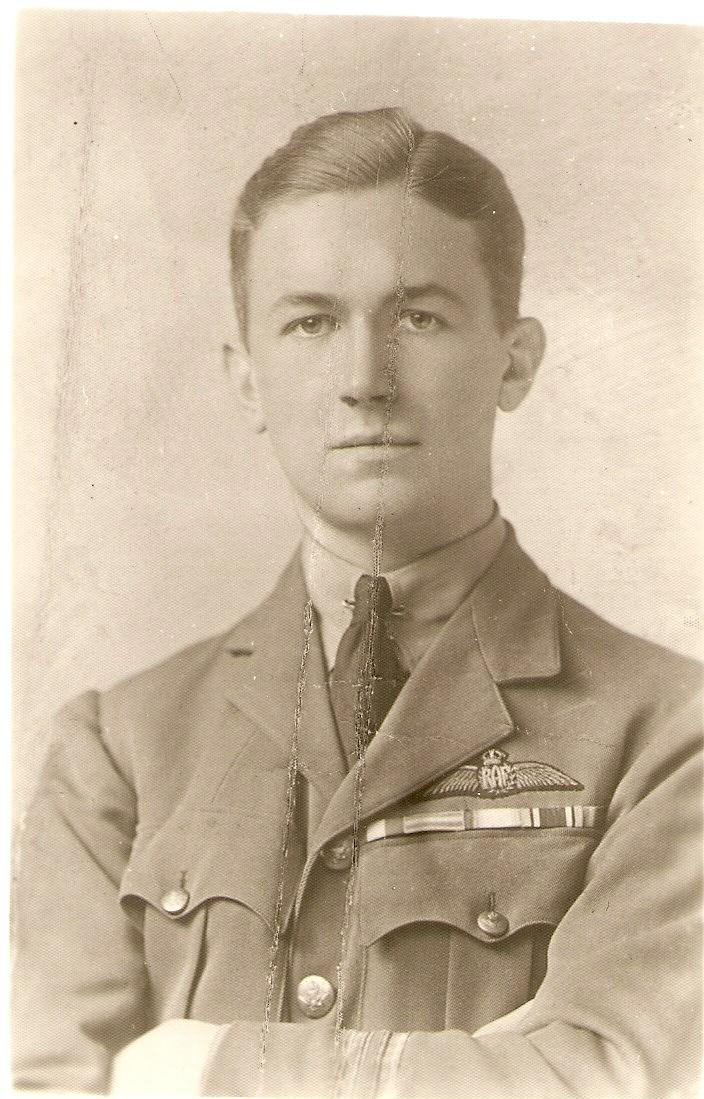
- Albert Enstone during WWI
- Born: 29 August 1895; Birmingham, England
- Died: 4 October 1963 (aged 68); Hemel Hempstead, Hertfordshire, England
- Burial place: Hemel Hempstead, Hertfordshire, England
- Military career
- Allegiance: United Kingdom
- Branch: Royal Navy; Royal Air Force
- Service years: 1916–1919
- Rank: Captain
- Nickname: Jim
- Unit: No. 4 Squadron RNAS/No. 204 Squadron RAF
- Conflicts: World War I
- Awards: Distinguished Service Cross; Distinguished Flying Cross
- Other work: Interior decorator and local artist

Captain Albert James Enstone DSC, DFC (29 August 1895 – 4 October 1963) was a British World War I flying ace. Various sources credit him with differing air victory scores. In one text, he is credited with 13 confirmed aerial victories and driving down 11 other German aircraft, including three Gotha bombers. Another source claims 15 confirmed aerial victories; ten (including one shared win) were destroyed, and five (including one shared win) were driven down out of control. He is known to have attacked two Gotha bombers. Regardless of his actual victory totals, records show that Enstone served his country valiantly.

== Early life ==
Albert James Enstone was the second son of Thomas and Flora Enstone of Edgbaston, Birmingham, England.

== World War I service ==
Enstone joined the Royal Naval Air Service on 3 April 1916 with the rank of temporary probationary flight sub-lieutenant. He gave a permanent home address in Birmingham, and his next of kin as his mother, Mrs. J. E. Enstone. He learned to fly at Cranwell. He seems to have shown early promise, as he was appointed as an acting flight commander during training. He graduated on 15 September 1916 with Royal Aero Club certificate 3677. Enstone was confirmed in his rank as flight sub-lieutenant on 8 November 1916; he had already been appointed an acting flight lieutenant as early as 10 April 1916.

He was one of the founding members of 4 Naval Squadron in April 1917; it was stationed at Bray Dunes on the Franco-Belgian border, and was tasked with both flying offensive patrols and escorting RNAS bombing missions. He used a Sopwith Pup to counter German probes over the English Channel. Enstone destroyed four enemy aircraft near or over the English Channel between 9 May and 5 June 1917, including one kill shared with Arnold Jacques Chadwick. His second victory, scored on 9 May, forecast his later citation for valour; Naval 4 battled a large opposing force of German Albatroses for 25 minutes, with Alexander MacDonald Shook and Langley Frank Willard Smith joining Enstone in victory.

After he and his squadron upgraded to Sopwith Camels, Enstone used his new mount to down three more German aircraft in July 1917, including an effort against a seaplane teamed with Chadwick and Ronald M. Keirstead. The new ace would go on to push his victory total to 10 for 1917. Between his ninth and tenth wins, on 1 October 1917, Enstone was promoted from temporary flight sub-lieutenant to temporary flight lieutenant. He also won the Distinguished Service Cross during this string of victories.

Enstone continued to win throughout the first half of 1918. When the RNAS was consolidated into the Royal Air Force on 1 April 1918, his position as flight commander automatically gained him the rank of captain. In August 1918, he was relieved of combat duty and returned to Home Establishment in England. He was awarded the Distinguished Flying Cross during this period.

== Post World War I ==
On 17 February 1919, Enstone was relieved of active duty and transferred to the unemployed list. Albert James Enstone married Elsie Grace Lilienfield on 16 March 1920 at Saint Mary's, Bryanston Square, London.

He went into business with an in-law. On 18 March 1924, Enstone dissolved a partnership with Clarence Walter Lynfield (formerly Lilienfield) as a general merchant in London, Birmingham, and Dublin.

On 27 November 1928, the firm of Enstone and Lilienfield posted notice that their joint stock company would dissolve within the next three months. On 26 April 1929, the firm was dissolved.

As was common for the RAF veterans of World War I, Enstone may have retained an appointment in the RAF Reserves, as there is discussion of his retention of rank during 1930.

Enstone also developed a career as an artist post-war. In fact, his death certificate records his occupation as "artist". He died at Field Cottage in Hemel, Hampstead on 4 October 1963, of carcinoma of the tonsils.

== Honours and awards ==
Distinguished Service Cross (DSC)

Flight Commander Alexander MacDonald Shook R.N.A.S.
Flight Lieutenant Arnold Jacques Chadwick R.N.A.S (since reported drowned)
Flight Sub-Lieutenant Albert James Enstone, R.N.A.S.
Flight Sub-Lieutenant Langley Frank Willard Smith R.N.A.S. (since reported missing)
For exceptional gallantry and remarkable skill and courage whilst serving with the R.N.A.S. at Dunkirk during May and June, 1917, in repeatedly attacking and destroying hostile aircraft.

Distinguished Flying Cross (DFC)
Capt. Albert James Enstone, D.S.C. (Sea Patrol).
Has been engaged for eighteen months on active service flying (ten months as Flight Leader). Has destroyed twelve hostile machines and brought down six more out of control. During the past month Capt. Enstone attacked an enemy gun, which was firing on one of our crashed machines, and succeeded in blowing up the ammunition dump alongside the gun, causing a great explosion, with flames reaching to a height of nearly 300 feet.

== List of victories ==
Accounts of victories scored by Albert James Enstone differ widely from source to source. The table below is an attempt to collate his victories. Numbered victories are those that were confirmed by the Royal Naval Air Service or its successor Royal Air Force. Unconfirmed victories are denoted by the notation "u/c". If you are uncertain about how to list a claim, Aerial victory standards of World War I can be instructive. Please supply source(s) of information for entries. Present list is based on Shores et al. (1990), p. 150, with additional sources noted for specific instances.

No.	Date/time	Aircraft	Foe	Result	Location	Notes
1	9 May 1917 @ 0730 hours	Sopwith Pup; Serial number N6187	Unidentified reconnaissance aircraft	Destroyed	Over Gistel, Belgium	
2	12 May 1917 @ 0720 hours	Sopwith Pup; Serial number N6187	Siemens-Schuckert D.I	Destroyed	5 miles off Zeebrugge, Belgium	Combat over the English Channel
3	26 May 1917 @ 0845 hours	Sopwith Pup; Serial number N6187	Unidentified reconnaissance plane	Destroyed	Southwest of Furnes, Belgium	Victory shared with Arnold Jacques Chadwick
4	5 June 1917 @ 1915 hours	Sopwith Pup; Serial number N6187	Enemy aircraft	Destroyed	2 miles northeast of Nieuwpoort, Belgium	
u/c	Morning of 5 July 1917	Sopwith Camel; Serial number N6347	Gotha bomber	Damaged	Combat over the English Channel	
u/c	Morning of 5 July 1917	Sopwith Camel; Serial number N6347	Gotha bomber	Driven down	Forced down in the Netherlands	
5	7 July 1917 @ 1115 hours	Sopwith Camel; Serial number N6347	Reconnaissance seaplane	Destroyed	19 miles off Ostend, Belgium	Combat over the English Channel
6	14 July 1917 @ 0420 hours	Sopwith Camel; Serial number N6370	Unidentified reconnaissance plane	Destroyed	A mile southeast of Gistel, Belgium	
7	25 July 1917 @ 1930 hours	Sopwith Camel; Serial number N6370	Seaplane	Driven down out of control	30 miles north-northeast of Ostend, Belgium	Victory shared with Ronald M. Keirstead
8	10 September 1917 @ 1625 hours	Sopwith Camel; Serial number B3841	Unidentified reconnaissance aircraft	Driven down out of control	Over Westende, Belgium	
9	30 September 1917 @ 1200 hours	Sopwith Camel; Serial number B3841	Albatros D.V	Driven down out of control	Over Rattevale	
10	9 November 1917 @ 1435 hours	Sopwith Camel; Serial number B3841	DFW reconnaissance aircraft	Driven down out of control	Southeast of Pervijze, Belgium	
11	24 March 1918 @ 1140 hours	Sopwith Camel; Serial number B3841	Albatros D.V	Destroyed; burned	South of Thorout	
12	27 June 1918 @ 0715 hours	Sopwith Camel; Serial number N6347	Unidentified reconnaissance aircraft	Driven down out of control	Over Nieuwpoort, Belgium	
13	30 June 1918 @ 1445 hours	Sopwith Camel; Serial number D6624	Fokker D.VII	Destroyed; burned	5 miles north of Blankenberge, Belgium	
14	30 June 1918 @ 1445 hours	Sopwith Camel; Serial number D6624	Fokker D.VII	Destroyed	North of Blankenberge, Belgium	
15	1 July 1918 @ 1710 hours	Sopwith Camel; Serial number D6624	Hansa-Brandenburg W.12	Destroyed	Over Middelkerke, Belgium	

== Bibliography ==
- Franks, Norman (2003). Sopwith Camel Aces of World War I. London, UK: Osprey Publishing. ISBN 978-1-84176-534-1.
- Franks, Norman (2005). Sopwith Pup Aces of World War I. London, UK: Osprey Publishing. ISBN 978-1-84176-886-1.
- Guttman, Jon (2011). Naval Aces of World War I. Osprey Publishing. ISBN 9781849083454.
- Shores, Christopher F.; Franks, Norman & Guest, Russell F. (1990). Above the Trenches: a Complete Record of the Fighter Aces and Units of the British Empire Air Forces 1915-1920. London, UK: Grub Street. ISBN 978-0-948817-19-9.
