= Arnold Jacques Chadwick =

Canadian World War I flying ace

- Born: August 23, 1893; Toronto, Ontario, Canada
- Died: July 28, 1917 (aged 23); English Channel, off De Panne, Belgium
- Military career
- Allegiance: King George V of the British Empire
- Branch: Royal Naval Air Service
- Rank: Flight Commander
- Units: No. 5 Wing RNAS, No. 4 Squadron RNAS
- Awards: Distinguished Service Cross

Flight Commander Arnold Jacques Chadwick DSC (August 23, 1893 – July 28, 1917) was a Canadian-born World War I flying ace credited with 11 aerial victories. He became an ace twice over; once while flying Sopwith Pups and again while piloting Sopwith Camels.

== Early life ==
Arnold Jacques Chadwick was born in Toronto, Ontario, Canada on 23 August 1895. He was the only son of C. W. Chadwick; the elder Chadwick was the manager of Colonial Realty Corporation.

== World War I ==
Chadwick joined the Royal Naval Air Service and was commissioned as a temporary Flight Sub-Lieutenant on 30 December 1915. He originally served in 5 Naval Wing after being trained. On 2 October 1916, while on a bombing raid aimed at Zeppelin hangars, he was shot down. He managed to evade capture and escape to the neutral country of the Netherlands. Once repatriated, Chadwick was assigned to 4 Naval Squadron in Bloody April 1917. Using a Sopwith Pup dubbed DO-DO, he scored his first aerial victory on 26 April 1917, driving down a German Albatros D.II fighter plane out of control.

On 25 May 1917, Chadwick destroyed an Albatros reconnaissance two-seater in the vicinity of Bray Dunes in the early morning. That same evening, he teamed with Langley Frank Willard Smith and two other British pilots to attack and destroy a German Gotha G multi-engine bomber north of Westende. The following day, he shared in a victory southwest of Furnes, when he and Albert Enstone destroyed a German recon machine. On 3 June 1917, he crashed an Albatros D.V to become an ace on Sopwith Pups.

Naval 4 then upgraded to Sopwith Camels. Chadwick would first score with one of them on 25 June, when he flambeed an Albatros recon two-seater over Roulers. On 3 July 1917, he drove down a German recon machine over Gistel. Three days later, he would share in the destruction of an Albatros two-seater in the same area. On a 10 July evening patrol, he drove down an Albatros D.V, then aided Ronald M. Keirstead to drive down a second one. Chadwick was now a Camel ace.

On 25 July 1917, Chadwick, Enstone, and Keirstead joined to destroy a German seaplane northward of Ostend. It was Chadwick's final victory. Three days later, he singlehandedly assaulted a formation of nine German airplanes. Losing the battle, he was forced to ditch in the English Channel off the coastal town of De Panne. His drowned corpse would wash ashore near Dunkirk on 17 August 1917

On 11 August 1917, Chadwick was awarded the Distinguished Service Cross in an unusual joint citation. He, Albert Enstone, Langley Frank Willard Smith, and Alexander MacDonald Shook were cited for: "exceptional gallantry and remarkable skill and courage whilst serving with the R.N.A.S. at Dunkirk during May and June, 1917, in repeatedly attacking and destroying hostile aircraft."
