= RAF Wormwood Scrubs =

Former Royal Air Force station

RAF Wormwood Scrubs RNAS Wormwood Scrubs
- Located in Wormwood Scrubs, Old Oak Common, England

Site information
- Type: Royal Air Force station
- Owner: Air Ministry
- Controlled by: Royal Naval Air Service; Royal Air Force
- Condition: Abandoned

Location
- RAF Wormwood Scrubs, shown within London
- Coordinates: 51°31′17″N 0°14′18″E

Site history
- Built: 1909
- In use: 1909-1930s

Royal Air Force Wormwood Scrubs or more simply RAF Wormwood Scrubs is a former Royal Air Force station located in Wormwood Scrubs, Old Oak Common, west London.

== History ==
In 1812, the War Office leased 77 hectares of Wormwood Scrubs from the Manor of Fulham to exercise cavalry horses. Eventually, the site was formalized for military use under the Wormwood Scrubs Act 1879, designating it for both military training and public recreation.

=== Establishment ===
As Wormwood Scrubs was situated closer to London than the Farnborough aircraft establishment, it became an ideal location for a new airship base. After the purchase of a Clement-Bayard II airship by British newspaper company Daily Mail, it was decided that a new base was necessary. On 15 July 1909, the construction of an airship shed measuring, 354ft long, 75ft wide, and 98ft high commenced, being funded by the Daily Mail. Afterwards, the site was locally known as the Daily Mail Airship "Garage". On August 1909, the Clement Bayard ship was completed, however it did not arrive until October 1910. Not long afterwards, the airship was dismantled and deflated despite never making a single voyage. In the next few years, it was put to use as an army storage facility. In 1912, it only saw the visit of the Army Airship Gamma, arriving from the Farnborough airship shed.

=== World War I ===
In 1914, the Admiralty gained authority of the site and shed, largely due to the large windbreak it provided. Subsequently, it was renamed to RNAS Wormwood Scrubs. Following this, the shed was primarily used to assemble and test the Submarine Scout class airship, and was often shipped out to other RNAS stations by rail. The shed was also used to train RNAS armoured car crews. In 1917, RNAS officer George Cyril Colmore was appointed Squadron Commander in command of RNAS Wormwood Scrubs. The No. 10 Aircraft Repair Depot was based in the airfield, however it only repaired RAF mechanical transport rather than aircraft. After the armistice in 1919, RNAS Wormwood Scrubs was closed.

It remained operating as a Royal Air Force emergency landing ground alongside civil aviation until the 1930s.

In 1956, a proposal was made to develop the site into an airport with a terminal operated by Scottish Airlines. However, it was rejected due to the Wormwood Scrubs Act 1879, which did not allow any permanent structures to be built.

== Present ==
Today, a part of the site has been redeveloped into the Linford Christie Stadium.
