= Wormwood Scrubs Act 1879 =

Act of Parliament of the United Kingdom

Wormwood Scrubs Act 1879 (Note: Section 1.)
- Act of Parliament
- Parliament of the United Kingdom
- Long title: An Act to provide for the user and regulation of certain Lands at Wormwood Scrubs.
- Citation: 42 & 43 Vict. c. clx
- Territorial extent: United Kingdom

Dates
- Royal assent: 21 July 1879
- Commencement: 21 July 1879 (Note: The Acts of Parliament (Commencement) Act 1793.)

Other legislation
- Amended by: Defence (Transfer of Functions) (No. 1) Order 1964; Local Law (Greater London Council and Inner London Boroughs) Order 1965; Local Government Reorganisation (Miscellaneous Provision) (No. 4) Order 1986
- Relates to: Military Forces Localization Act 1872; Metropolitan Board of Works (Various Powers) Act 1886

Status: Amended

History of passage through Parliament

Records of Parliamentary debate relating to the statute from Hansard

Text of statute as originally enacted

Text of the Wormwood Scrubs Act 1879 as in force today (including any amendments) within the United Kingdom, from legislation.gov.uk.

The Wormwood Scrubs Act 1879 (42 & 43 Vict. c. clx) is a local act of the Parliament of the United Kingdom that laid down the conditions under which Wormwood Scrubs in west London was to be owned by the British Army. The act vested the land to the Metropolitan Board of Works, to be maintained as a place of public recreation, subject to the rights of use by the military.

== Background ==
In 1812, the War Office (now the Ministry of Defence) leased an area of 77 hectares (190 acres) from the Manor of Fulham in order to exercise cavalry horses, which until then had been exercised in Hyde Park, Belgrave Square – then known as Five Fields – and Regent's Park – then known as St. Marylebone's Park. The original twenty-five year lease was subsequently extended in 1829, with the War Office paying £150 to the commoners each year.

In 1872, the War Office purchased 193 acres (0.78 km^{2}) for a total cost of £52,615, with a view to "create a metropolitan exercising ground in pursuance of the Military Forces Localisation Act 1872 (35 & 36 Vict. c. 68), sufficiently large enough for military training close to the centre of the expanding London metropolis.

Land purchases
Land	Area	Previous Owners	Purchase Price
Common land known as Wormwood Scrubs	135 acres (0.55 km^{2})	Manor of Fulham	£27,000
Adjacent inclosed land	53 acres (0.21 km^{2})	Various freeholders	£25,615
Adjacent inclosed land	5 acres (0.020 km^{2})	Great Western Railway Company	£25,615

In 1874, concerns were raised in Parliament over the attempts by the War Office to acquire absolute rights from the land's copyholders, leading to the possible future exclusion of the public from the common land.

In 1876, the War Office made a proposal to the Metropolitan Board of Works to vest the land to the Board, on the condition that the Board drain and maintain the area as an open space for the benefit of the public, subject to the use of the British Army.

The Board applied to the Inclosure Commissioners for a scheme under the Metropolitan Commons Act 1866 (29 & 30 Vict. c. 122), but were informed they would be unable to extend the scheme to the freehold land, leading to the need to introduce a bill for that purpose.

== Passage ==
Leave to bring in the Wormwood Scrubs Regulation Bill to the House of Commons was granted to the Financial Secretary to the Treasury, Sir Henry Selwin-lbbetson MP and the Financial Secretary to the War Office, Colonel Loyd Lindsay MP on 8 July 1878. The bill had its first reading in the House of Commons on 8 July 1878, presented by Sir Henry Selwin-lbbetson MP and was referred to the Examiners of Petitions for Private Bills, which reported on 12 July 1878. The bill was withdrawn on 31 July 1878, before a second reading.

Leave to bring in the re-introduced Wormwood Scrubs Regulation Bill to the House of Commons was granted to the Financial Secretary to the War Office, Colonel Loyd Lindsay MP, the Secretary of State for War, Frederick Stanley MP and Lord Eustace Cecil on 4 March 1879. The bill had its first reading in the House of Commons on 4 March 1879, presented by Colonel Loyd Lindsay MP, and was referred to the Examiners of Petitions for Private Bills, which reported on 17 March 1879. The bill had its second reading in the House of Commons on 18 March 1879 and was committed to a select committee. George Shaw Lefevre MP, Alexander Hamilton-Gordon MP, Colonel Nigel Kingscote MP and Colonel Loyd Lindsay MP were appointed to the committee on 16 May 1879. The committee met reported on 11 June 1879, with amendments to strengthen the rights of and compensation to the copyholders of the Manor of Fulham. The amended bill was re-committed to a committee of the whole house, which met and reported on 19 June 1879, without amendments. The bill had its third reading in the House of Commons on 23 June 1879 and passed, without amendments.

The bill had its first reading in the House of Lords on 24 June 1879. The text of the bill was opposed in a petition by the copyholders of the Manor of Fulham, who requested insertion of clauses for their protection. The bill had its second reading in the House of Lords on 30 June 1879 and was committed to a select committee on 1 July 1879, which was discharged on 8 July 1879. The bill was committed to the consideration of the Chairman of Committees, which reported on 10 July 1879, without amendments. The bill was re-committed to a committee of the whole house, which met and reported on 11 July 1879, without amendments. The bill had its third reading in the House of Lords on 14 July 1879 and passed, without amendments.

The bill was granted royal assent on 21 July 1879.

== Provisions ==
Section 2 of the act vested the land to the Metropolitan Board of Works and its successors.

Section 3 of the act required the Metropolitan Board of Works to ensure that alongside military training, the land could be given over to "the perpetual use thereof by the inhabitants of the metropolis for exercise and recreation". The section prevented the Army from building any "permanent erections" other than rifle butts and "their related appurtenances". The section also banned military training on public holidays without the consent of the Metropolitan Board of Works.

Section 4 of the act gave the Metropolitan Board of Works and its successors the ability to maintain and improve the land, although any such scheme must be referred to the War Office or its successors for approval. The section allowed both parties to appoint adjudicators to umpire approval disagreements.

Section 5 of the act gives rights and authority to the public, the Army and the Metropolitan Board of Works and its successors.

Section 6 of the act gave the Metropolitan Board of Works the authority to pass by-laws over the area, while the Army can prohibit entry by civilians on pain of fines or imprisonment during periods of military training.

Section 7 of the act provided that expenses of the Metropolitan Board of Works under the act would be considered expenses under the Metropolis (Management) Act 1855 (18 & 19 Vict. c. 120), as amended.

Section 8 of the act protected the public's right to enjoy Wormwood Scrubs in perpetuity – it may not be taken back wholesale by the military or sold unless the area "ceases to be used by the citizens of London".

Section 9 of the act provided that compensation for any estate, interest, or right in Wormwood Scrubs common that was taken away or injuriously affected would be paid as if under the Metropolitan Commons Act 1866 (29 & 30 Vict. c. 122), with the Metropolitan Board of Works responsible for payment and specific provisions for copyholders through the homage jury of the Manor of Fulham.

== Developments to the common ==
The principal work carried out on Wormwood Scrubs was a complete system of under-drainage to address flooding, including knee-deep water experienced by soldiers at military ranges in the common.

A 22 acres (0.089 km^{2}) portion of the original common severed from the remainder by the West London Railway, known as Little Wormwood Scrubs, remained under the ownership of the Ecclesiastical Commissioners on copyhold from the Manor of Fulham. In 1886, the Metropolitan Board of Works (Various Powers) Act 1886 (49 & 50 Vict. c. cxii) was passed, which vested the area to the Metropolitan Board of Works for a purchase price of £2,000. Improvements to the Little Scrubs were carried out in 1893–94, including widening and installing weirs on the stream, paving and landscaping.

Attempts have been made to construct permanent structures on Wormwood Scrubs, for example temporary smallpox hospital in 1881 housing developments in 1947, and an airport terminal for Scottish Airlines in 1956.

In 2005, the government made clear that the act is still adhered to by all parties, and that the military does still use the area for training. Several rifle butts, being the only class of permanent structure permitted to be erected by the act, survive to this day, including as a wall in the Linford Christie Stadium.

== Governance ==
Sections 1–5 and 8 of the act were repealed by article 4(1) of, and schedule 2 to, the Local Law (Greater London Council and Inner London Boroughs) Order 1965 (SI 1965/540).

The act remains in force today and governs the operation of the Wormwood Scrubs, alongside the Commons Act 2006. The Ministry of Defence succeeded the War Office and following the disbandment of the Metropolitan Board of Works, responsibility for the management of Wormwood Scrubs fell to its successors, the London County Council on 21 March 1889, the Greater London Council on 1 April 1965 and eventually to the Hammersmith and Fulham London Borough Council on 1 April 1986.

Pursuant to a scheme of the Charity Commissioners dated 25 March 2002, the Wormwood Scrubs is managed by the Wormwood Scrubs Charitable Trust. The Hammersmith and Fulham London Borough Council acts as the sole corporate trustee and manages the trust through the Wormwood Scrubs Charitable Trust Committee.

The act was appended by a memorandum of understanding between the Ministry of Defence and the Greater London Council on 1 October 1980 that set out which party has responsibility for carrying out and paying for improvements to the land under certain circumstances.
