= Ronald M. Keirstead =

Canadian flying ace (1895–1970)

- Born: Ronald McNeill Keirstead; 20 June 1895; Wolfville, Nova Scotia
- Died: 23 October 1970 (aged 75); Wolfville, Nova Scotia
- Military career
- Allegiance: George V
- Branch: Royal Flying Corps
- Rank: Captain
- Unit: 4N Squadron RNAS/No. 204 Squadron RAF
- Awards: Distinguished Service Cross
- Other work: Canadian Ministry of Munitions during World War II

Captain Ronald McNeill Keirstead DSC (20 June 1895 – 23 October 1970) was a Canadian First World War flying ace, officially credited with 13 victories.

== World War I ==
Keirstead learned to fly at the civilian Curtiss School in Toronto in 1916. He then joined the Royal Naval Air Service, and was posted to 4N Squadron as a Sopwith Camel pilot on 15 June 1917. Less than a month later, on 10 July, he shared his first aerial victory with Flight Commander Arnold Jacques Chadwick, as they set a German Albatros D.V afire in midair for a win apiece. On 25 July, Keirstead, Chadwick, and James Enstone shared in the destruction of a seaplane east of Diksmuide. On 18 August, Keirstead drove another Albatros D.V down out of control. On 24 September 1917, he drove a third Albatros down out of control, then immediately set afire another and killed its pilot from Jasta 28. Oberleutnant Jahn's death made Keirstead an ace and garnered him a DSC.

Keirstead would win three more times in 1917, ending the year with an out of control win on 6 December. His DSC would be gazetted on 22 February 1918. The big day of Flight Commander Keirstead's career as an ace came on the afternoon of 21 March, when he drove down a Pfalz D.III fighter, destroyed another, and teamed with a Belgian Spad to destroy yet another Pfalz. He would score two more single victories after his squadron was redesignated 204 Squadron RAF, rounding off his tally on 12 June 1918. In summary, Keirstead was credited with destroying six enemy airplanes, including three shared wins; driving six more down out of control; and sharing in the capture of a Rumpler.

== Post World War I ==
Keirstead would be partially blinded in an accidental munitions explosion during World War II.

== Distinguished Service Cross citation ==
Flt.-Sub-Lieut. Ronald McNeill Keirstead, R.N.A.S. In recognition of conspicuous gallantry in aerial combats. On 24 September 1917, he engaged single-handed four enemy aeroplanes, of which two were destroyed by him. On 21 October 1917, during an engagement between a British and a German formation, he attacked one of the enemy scouts and shot its port wings away from the rest of the machine. He then dived on to some enemy scouts which were attacking another of our machines and brought one of them down in a spinning nose dive.
