= Wormwood Scrubs =

Common land in the United Kingdom

Coordinates: 51°31′17″N 00°14′20″W

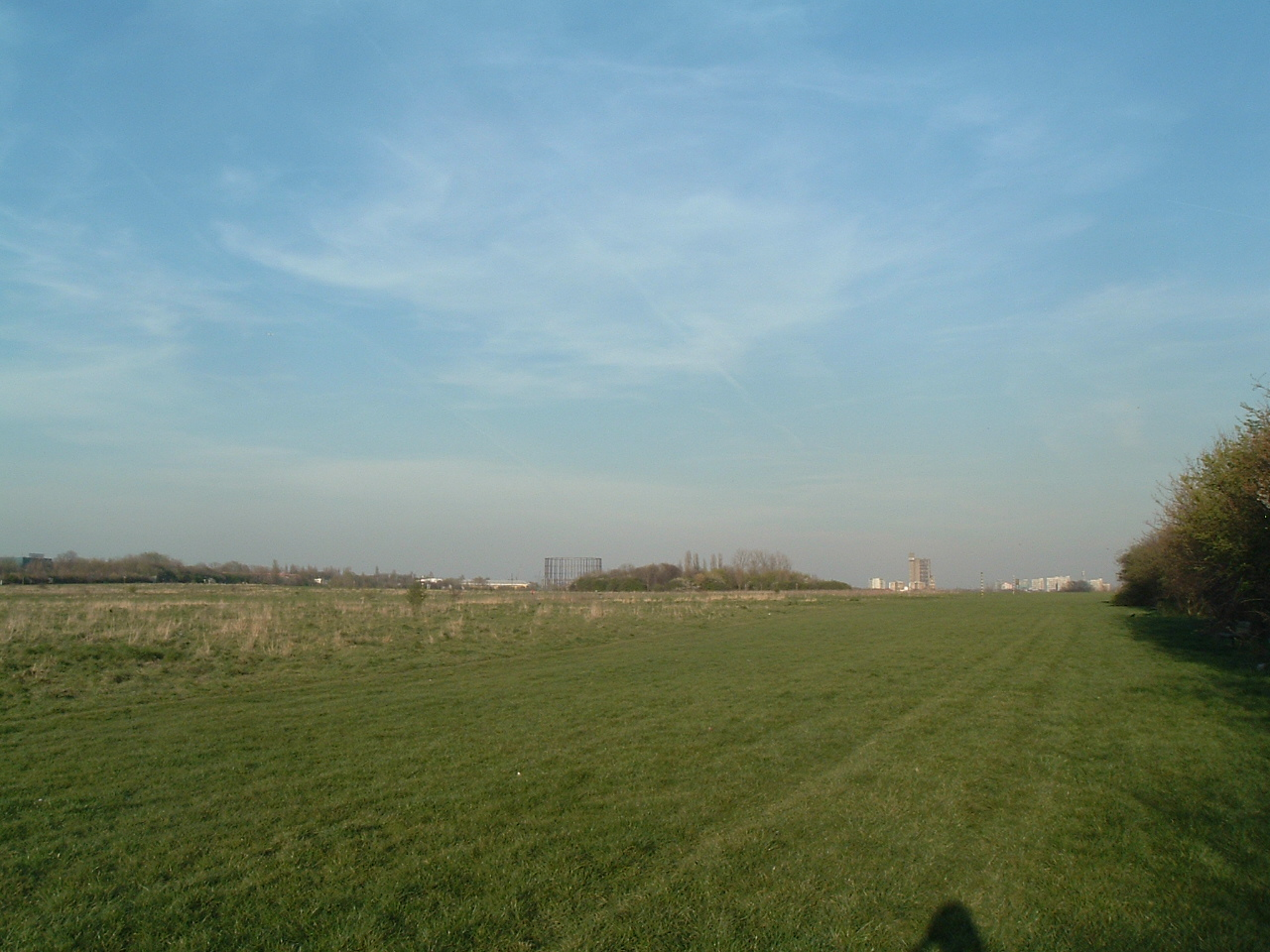
Looking east from the south-western edge of Wormwood Scrubs

Wormwood Scrubs, known locally as The Scrubs (or simply Scrubs), is an open space in Old Oak Common located in the north-eastern corner of the London Borough of Hammersmith and Fulham in west London. It is the largest open space in the borough, at 67 hectares (170 acres), and one of the largest areas of common in London. The eastern part, known as Little Wormwood Scrubs, is cut off by Scrubs Lane and the West London line railway. It has been an open public space since the Wormwood Scrubs Act 1879.

The southern edge of the Scrubs is the site of two locally important institutions. At the western end is HM Prison Wormwood Scrubs, built between 1875 and 1891 by convict labour. To the east of the prison is the Hammersmith Hospital campus, which includes the relocated Queen Charlotte's and Chelsea Hospital.

Within the area are several sports facilities, including the Linford Christie Stadium, tens of football pitches, and a pony centre. Queens Park Rangers Football Club played on Wormwood Scrubs between 1893 and 1896.

== History ==
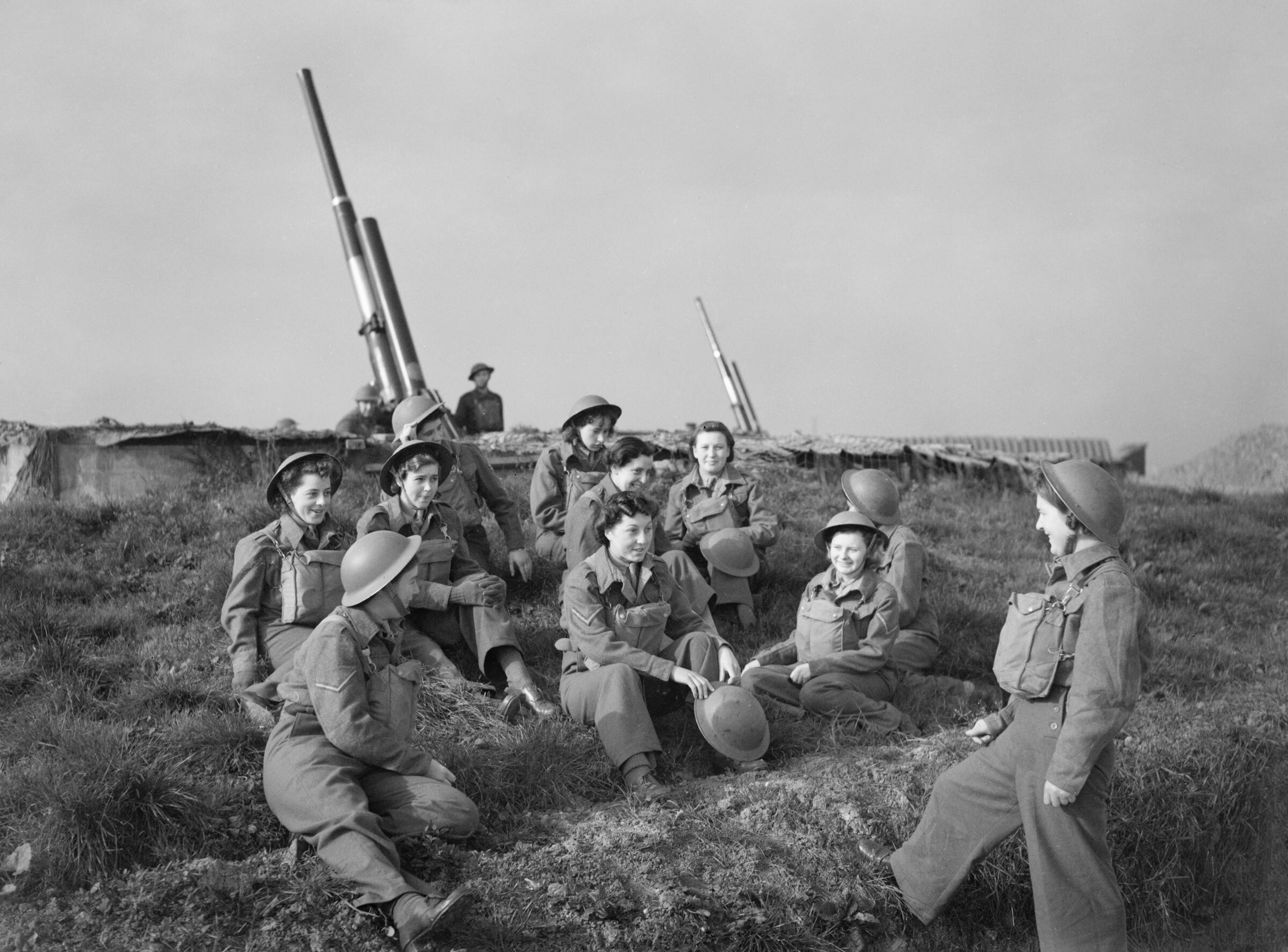
Auxiliary Territorial Service (ATS) women at a 3.7-inch anti-aircraft gun site 22 October 1941

The area is first mentioned in 1189 as Wormhold Scrubs (lit. 'shrubland [by] snake-forest'); the area was cleared woodland used for pasture for the cattle and pigs of the local manor. In 1801, the northern section was cut off by the building of the Paddington Arm of the Grand Junction Canal. In 1812, an area of 77 hectares (190 acres) known as Wormholt Scrubs was leased by the War Office from the Manor of Fulham. This was in order to exercise cavalry horses, which until then had been exercised in Hyde Park, Belgrave Square and Regent's Park (then known as St. Marylebone's Park). This common land became known as Wormwood Scrubs. The London and Birmingham Railway removed a section north of the canal in 1837, followed by the Great Western line removing a section to the south of the canal in 1838. 1844 saw the Birmingham, Bristol and Thames Junction Railway slice off a sizable section of the eastern half, becoming The Little Scrubs. In 1872, the manorial rights were purchased under the Military Forces Localisation Act 1872 with the intention of creating a military exercise ground. The Wormwood Scrubs Act 1879 was later enacted, which aimed to create a "metropolitan exercising ground" for the military, and to provide the Scrubs for "the perpetual use by the inhabitants of the metropolis for exercise and recreation". Under this Act, the military were empowered to expel civilians from the area whenever they were training, but they allowed civilians free use of it when they were not. To ensure that it was kept as open land for all to enjoy, the act banned the military from building any permanent structures other than rifle butts, one of which survives today as a wall in the Linford Christie Stadium. In 1873, the southern part of the Scrubs was purchased for the building of Wormwood Scrubs Prison, and in 1889, an area adjacent to the prison was purchased for the building of Hammersmith hospital.

In 1908, the Olympic Marathon route from Windsor Castle to the Olympic Stadium at White City went across the Scrubs. In 1910 Wormwood Scrubs became part of aviation history when a pioneer airship took flight from an improvised landing ground; The Daily Mail Airship Garage was built shortly afterwards—the site is now occupied by the Linford Christie Stadium. In 1914 all air-related activities on the Scrubs passed to the authority of the Admiralty, and there are records in The National Archives of a base here called Wormwood Scrubs Naval Air Station. The airship shed was used to train RNAS armoured car crews. It remained as an emergency landing ground until the 1930s. In 1939, with the onset of the Second World War, Wormwood Scrubs again played host to an innovative military department—the Chief Cable Censorship Department, an outstation of the Government Code and Cypher School (GC&CS) at Bletchley Park. In 1928 St. Clement Danes Grammar School moved from Holborn to a newly built school on Du Cane Road next to Hammersmith Hospital; the school buildings were demolished in 1975, when the school moved out of London.

It was served by St. Quintin Park and Wormwood Scrubs railway station on the West London Line. On 3 October 1940 the station was struck by an incendiary bomb and destroyed by fire.

The prison is located just yards from the scene of the Massacre of Braybrook Street in 1966, in which three policemen were shot dead by three armed men after stopping their suspicious car.

In 1986 local birdwatcher Lester Holloway set up a campaign to save Scrubs Wood, the area of railway land along the north side of Wormwood Scrubs, from destruction as part of plans by the then British Rail to build cleaning depots (see North Pole depot) to service Channel Tunnel trains. Holloway and his campaign petitioned the House of Lords, supported by the then MP for Fulham Nick Raynsford, and won concessions. The existing nature reserve includes an area known as 'Lester's Embankment'. The campaign attracted considerable national publicity in 1987, and even a musical.

From 1965 until 1994 the western part of Wormwood Scrubs lay in the London Borough of Ealing, and was known as Old Oak Common. The name is still shown on maps today. In 1994 the whole park became part of the London Borough of Hammersmith and Fulham.

== Finances ==
The Wormwood Scrubs Charitable Trust, a charity set up under the Act of Parliament to manage this public space "for the exercise and recreation of the inhabitants of the metropolis", receives a substantial income stream from the lease to Hammersmith Hospital of a car park on its southern boundary. Other sources of income from the space include the rental of sports fields, advertising billboards, and two public car parks. The accounting for costs and revenues of the charity has been a matter of debate between the council, currently the charity's sole trustee, and the Friends of Wormwood Scrubs.

=== Wormwood Scrubs Charitable Trust ===
Wormwood Scrubs Charitable Trust
- Formation: February 23, 1994; 32 years ago
- Founder: London Borough of Hammersmith & Fulham
- Type: Charitable Trust
- Headquarters: Hammersmith Town Hall
- Website: https://democracy.lbhf.gov.uk/mgCommitteeDetails.aspx?ID=467

The Wormwood Scrubs Charitable Trust (WSCT) is a charitable trust that manages the Wormwood Scrubs. In 1879, the Wormwood Scrubs Act 1879 (42 & 43 Vict. c. clx) was passed, which vested the land to the Metropolitan Board of Works, to be maintained as a place of public recreation, subject to the rights of use by the War Office (now the Ministry of Defence). Following the disbandment of the Metropolitan Board of Works, responsibility for the management of Wormwood Scrubs fell to its successors, the London County Council on 21 March 1889, the Greater London Council on 1 April 1965 and eventually to the Hammersmith and Fulham London Borough Council on 1 April 1986.

The trust was formed on 23 February 1994 "to encourage sporting and recreational use of Wormwood Scrubs through the provision and maintenance of an environment that is conducive to its objective. In addition to supporting the recreational activities provided by the Council through the Linford Christie stadium, the Trust's main activity relates to the maintenance of the scrubs itself."

The trust is governed by the provisions of the act and a scheme of the Charity Commissioners dated 25 March 2002. The Hammersmith and Fulham Council acts as the sole corporate trustee and manages the trust through the Wormwood Scrubs Charitable Trust Committee, which is "charged with managing the affairs of the Trust, improving its focus and performance, and ensuring it achieves its charitable objectives." The committee consists of three councillors and two non-voting co-opted members, who tend to be members of the Friends of Wormwood Scrubs.

Under a scheme of delegation, daily management of the trust estate is undertaken by the Trust Manager, with senior support provided by the assistant director for Parks and Leisure and the Director of Public Realm. The de facto Chief Executive Officer and Chief Financial Officer of the trust are the council's Chief Executive and Director of Finance, respectively.

== Local nature reserve ==
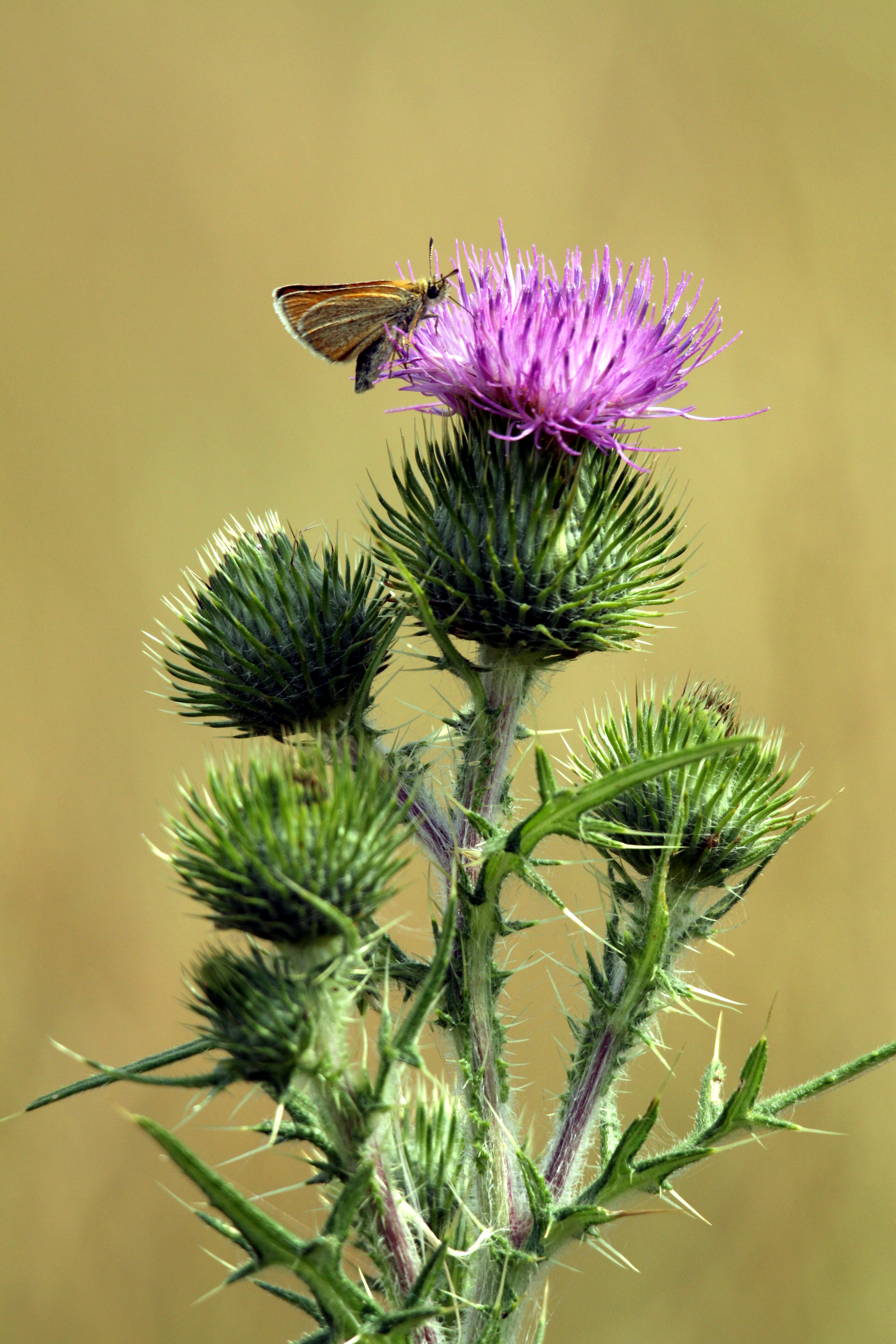
Essex skipper (Thymelicus lineola) in Wormwood Scrubs

Areas of Wormwood Scrubs are a local nature reserve. These areas include Braybrook Woods, Martin Bell's Wood and the Central Woodland Copse. Habitats include woodland (plantation), scrub and grassland. Animals include common lizards, over 100 species of bird and 20 species of butterfly. This site is currently being managed by the London Borough of Hammersmith and Fulham in collaboration with Groundwork UK.

== Conservation efforts ==
Conservation work being carried out in Wormwood Scrubs by Groundwork London has been a subject of controversy among users of the Scrubs. The primary goal is to connect each patch of the Local Nature Reserve within the grounds by a wildlife corridor in the form of low hedges and trees. Ultimately, it is claimed that this will benefit biodiversity in the park and create better foraging routes for bats such as the common pipistrelle.

Habitats for the local common lizards are also being changed, e.g. by the removal of scrub to create basking areas. This work includes planting trees, and it is feared that this could jeopardise the open nature of the common. The bulk of the work is currently being undertaken by volunteers for Groundwork London, a government quasi non-governmental organisation funded largely through a levy on landfill.

== Facilities ==
The trust maintains responsibility for 76.8 hectares (190 acres) of open, green space and associated assets in Wormwood Scrubs, including 2 outdoor gym areas, 2 children's play areas, a pony riding centre, an athletics stadium, numerous grass sports pitches, grounds maintenance and green waste processing depot, a BMX cycling track and a temporary secondary school site.
