= Anthony Jacques Mantle =

British aviator (1899–1988)

- Born: 1899; London, England
- Died: 1988 (aged 89); Durham, England
- Military career
- Allegiance: United Kingdom
- Branch: Royal Naval Air Service; Royal Air Force
- Service years: 1917–1920
- Rank: Flying Officer
- Conflicts: First World War
- Awards: Distinguished Flying Cross (DFC); Mentioned in dispatches

Anthony Jacques Mantle DFC (17 December 1899 in London – 1988 in Durham) was a pilot who joined the Royal Naval Air Service in 1917 at the age of 17. He went to France, Italy and later over Turkey. His flying career ended when he was forced to land behind enemy lines in Russia and was taken as a prisoner of war and held for 10 months in Moscow. He was awarded the Distinguished Flying Cross (DFC) in 1919. His cousin, Jack Mantle, was a recipient of the Victoria Cross.

== Service history ==
Mantle volunteered for service with the Royal Naval Air Service (RNAS) in early 1917, but this was merged with the Royal Flying Corps (RFC) on 1 April 1918 to form the world's first independent air force, the Royal Air Force. He was appointed second lieutenant on probation the day the RAF was formed. His service record indicates that from September 1916 to March 1917 he had been working as a broker's clerk at the firm of J Amis on Mincing Lane in the City of London.

It is not clear where he was initially based, but in November 1917 he was posted to Greenwich, and then to Vendome in France on 8 February 1918 to the Royal Naval Air Service Training Establishment (RNASTE) airfield, (known locally as the 'Camp de Poulines') 5 km to the South of the town (47.75137°N 1.04389°E) where he trained on the Curtiss JN-4, a.k.a. the 'Jenny'. After just over a month in France, he was posted back to the United Kingdom on 23 March, going to RAF Cranwell. It seems it was then intended that he should join either 66 or 67 Wing based on the Adriatic, but it took some months to organise transport. Until transport was available, he was based at RAF Eastchurch. He departed in July 1918. In October 66 Wing was renumbered 62 Wing. By 11 October he was on the island of Mudros. He was ordered back to England in December 1918. He was attached to No. 222 Squadron and No. 226 Squadron during this period. Transport again seems to have been problematic, and by March 1919, he was still in Malta, at Spinola Bay, San Ġiljan.

Mantle was now offered the opportunity to see action on the Caspian Sea. He was stationed inland at Petrofska from April 1919, where he flew the DH-9A aircraft (Dehavilland two seater biplanes), as part of the British movement to protect oil interests in Baku, Azerbaijan.

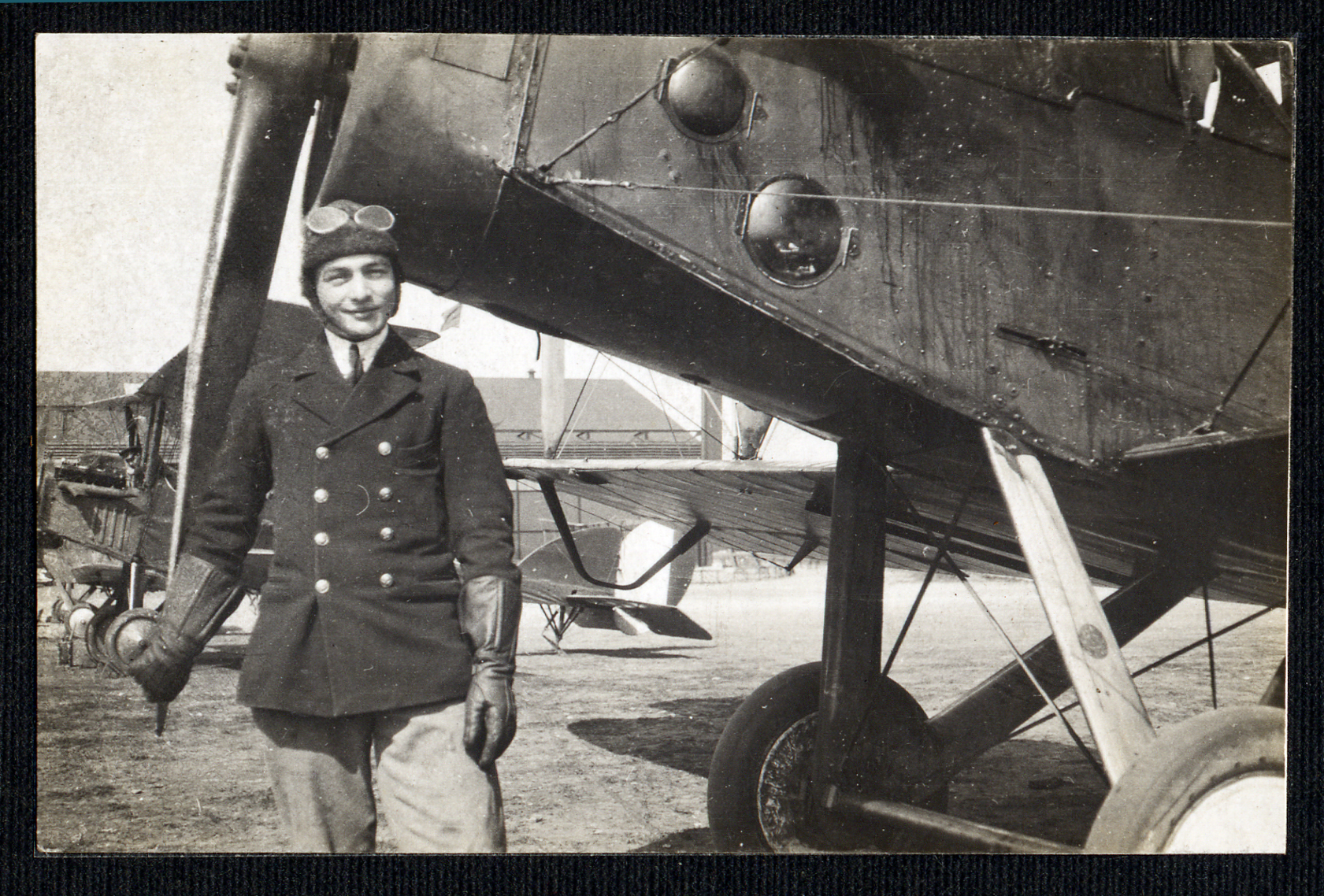
Anthony Jacques Mantle in full flight gear at RAF Cranwell.

While out on a raid over the Volga in, with his observer, Harry Ingrams, in August 1919, their plane developed engine trouble and they were forced to crash land on a large island in the Volga Delta. They were unhurt and managed to burn the plane, but were ambushed shortly afterwards by an armed group of locals who took them prisoner. The local Commissar tore up the official documentation offering a reward for their safe return over the border and then organised for a local schoolteacher to act as translator as they were taken to Astrakhan for questioning. He was then taken by train to Moscow whereupon he spent several weeks in Lubyanka prison in the company of other allied prisoners before being moved to Bytereski Prison.

Months later, after the work of an Army chaplain called Frank North, he and several of his companions were taken to the border with Finland and released in part exchange for Bolshevik prisoners. While prisoner, he was promoted flying officer on 7 December 1919. He arrived in Finland on 31 March 1920. He returned to the UK on a ship that docked at Southampton on 24 April 1920. He was placed on the unemployed list and demobilised on 26 June 1920.

== Honours and awards ==
- 1 January 1919 – Lieut. Anthony Jacques Mantle was mentioned in dispatches for distinguished service in the Adriatic.
- 8 February 1919 – 2nd Lieut Anthony Jacques Mantle, Sea Patrol, Aegean theatre awarded the Distinguished Flying Cross in recognition of gallantry in flying operations against the enemy:

On 25th October, 1918, he led his flight for 2½ hours in a successful raid on Constantinople. His formation was attacked by hostile scouts on the journey, but by clever airmanship he succeeded in destroying two enemy machines without incurring loss to his flight. 2nd Lieut. Mantle rendered valuable services previously in the Adriatic, for which he was mentioned in despatches in the London Gazette of 1st January, 1919

— London Gazette
