= Lester Holloway =

British journalist and editor (born 1970)

Lester John Holloway (born 22 July 1970) is a British journalist and editor, as well as a campaigner and local politician.

== Career ==
Born in Shepherd's Bush, London, Holloway began his media career as a reporter for Eastern Eye, a weekly newspaper published by Ethnic Media Group, in 1999. He later became News Editor at The Voice, and was editor of the New Nation newspaper from January 2008 until January 2009, when the paper ceased production due to its parent company Ethnic Media Group going into administration. He was New Media Manager at the campaign group Operation Black Vote between June 2009 and March 2010, and worked for The Runnymede Trust and the TUC, before returning to The Voice as Editor in 2021.

In 1987 he won a BBC Radio 4 "Best of British Youth" award for a campaign to save parts of Old Oak Common, an area of local natural importance. Prior to journalism, Holloway was a local authority councillor (Labour Party) in the London Borough of Hammersmith and Fulham, between 1994 and 1998, representing the College Park and Old Oak Ward. He left the Labour Party in 2000, after nine years, and rejoined in 2017.

Holloway was influential in the formation of the organisation Friends of Wormwood Scrubs.
