= Herbert Thompson (civil servant) =

British fighter-pilot during the First World War and civil servant in India

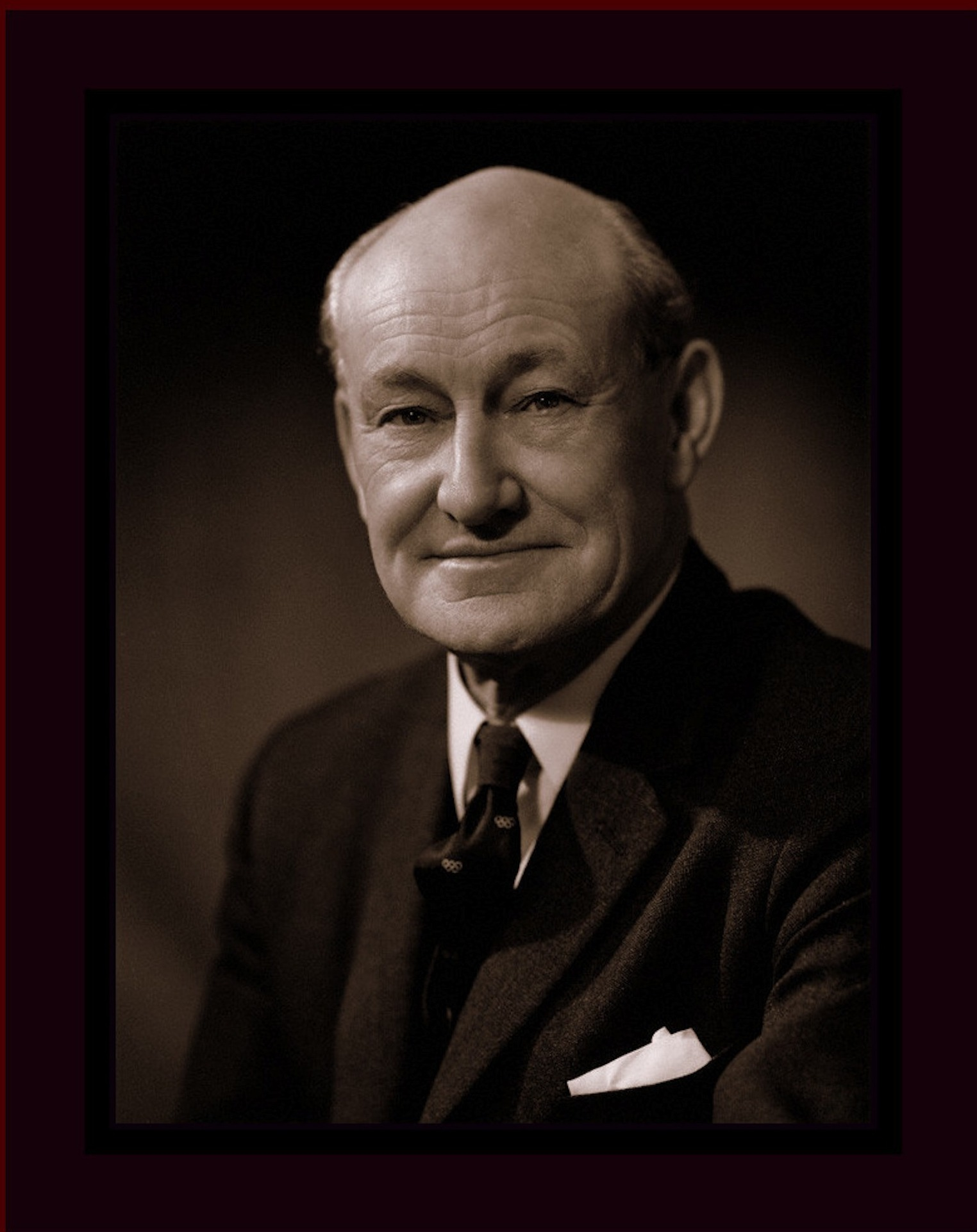
- Herbert Thompson, c. 1945
- Born: Joseph Herbert Thompson; 9 March 1898; Wilmslow, Cheshire, England
- Died: 28 March 1984 (aged 86); Stoke Mandeville, Buckinghamshire, England
- Education: Manchester Grammar School; Brasenose College, Oxford
- Occupations: Civil servant, pilot, author
- Known for: Resident in British India, RAF pilot in WWI
- Spouse: Kathleen Rodier
- Children: 3
- Awards: CIE, Knight Bachelor

Sir Joseph Herbert Thompson, CIE (9 March 1898 – 28 March 1984) was a British fighter‑pilot, civil servant and newspaper correspondent. During the First World War he flew with the Royal Naval Air Service and later the Royal Air Force, shooting down the German ace Hans Waldhausen in September 1917. After the war he studied at Brasenose College, Oxford and joined the Indian Civil Service, rising to become Resident for the Punjab States in Lahore during the final years of British rule. Thompson was appointed a Companion of the Order of the Indian Empire (CIE) in 1945 and was knighted in 1948. In retirement he wrote about rowing and served as the rowing correspondent of The Sunday Times.

== Early life and education ==
Thompson was born on 9 March 1898 at Wilmslow, Cheshire, the elder son of J. Arnold Thompson and Ellen Stewart Fraser. He was educated at Manchester Grammar School, where, in his memoir Icarus Went East, he recalled hearing a talk about the Indian Civil Service that inspired him to pursue a career in the ICS. Although his family lacked wealth or influence, he credited his parents for instilling culture and Idealism.

Thompson's enthusiasm for public service was matched by a fascination with flying. In Icarus Went East he recounts meeting Winston Churchill at the Reform Club in Manchester; Churchill asked Thompson's father whether he might "have him for my Navy". With his parents' permission he applied for a temporary commission in the Royal Naval Air Service. His father obtained a recommendation from Churchill, and Thompson later recalled that the Admiralty board posed only one memorable question — "what meat goes with redcurrant jelly?" — before awarding him a commission. He joined the RNAS as a probationary sub‑lieutenant and trained at Crystal Palace and Redcar before flying Maurice Farman, Curtiss, Sopwith Pup and Sopwith Camel aircraft.

When the Royal Air Force was formed on 1 April 1918, Thompson automatically transferred and was promoted to captain. During his tour with Naval 8 Squadron he was seconded to the Royal Flying Corps and, in September 1917, helped to intercept a German fighter attacking a British observation balloon. In his memoir he writes that the German pilot machine‑gunned the parachuting observer before two British Sopwith Camels pursued and shot him down; the enemy airman, later identified as Hans Waldhausen, was captured and entertained by another squadron. After the war an American historian put Thompson in contact with Waldhausen; the two men corresponded and later met in Luxembourg and Cologne. Thompson was demobilised in January 1919 and returned to Oxford, where he completed his degree at Brasenose College and captained the boat club. He then taught briefly at Oundle School.

== Indian Civil Service ==
Thompson entered the Indian Civil Service (ICS) in 1922 and served initially in the Madras Presidency. In 1926 he transferred to the Government of India's Foreign and Political Department and began a succession of administrative postings.

Thompson's early years were spent on the North‑West Frontier. As an assistant commissioner he contracted malaria and typhoid, but after recovering he was appointed additional divisional and sessions judge at Peshawar. In Icarus Went East, he recounted that the post carried the responsibilities of an assize judge and that he tried hundreds of murder cases — by his own count 375 trials, of which 191 resulted in death sentences. Believing that the death penalty could deter blood feuds, he imposed it in cases of deliberate murder and noted that such duties were heavy for a 31‑year‑old. After four years he requested a return to the princely‑states side of the service.

In 1930, Thompson accepted a posting as Secretary to the Resident at Hyderabad. According to his memoir, the secretary acted as counsellor and head of chancery while simultaneously serving as sessions judge, inspector general of police and head of prisons, medical services, forests and registration. As chairman of the Secunderabad Town Improvement Trust, he organised slum clearance and oversaw the construction of a broad highway through the bazaar to combat plague, later named Kingsway. Because Hyderabad’s population were British protected persons rather than British subjects, he also acted as passport‑issuing authority and registrar of births for British nationals born there.

After three years in Hyderabad, Thompson was posted to Rajputana and, in 1937, became acting Resident at Jaipur. Jaipur was considered a premier posting and usually reserved for officers about to be promoted to one of the seven first‑class residencies. Politically his principal task was to persuade the Rajput and smaller states to federate; he and fellow political officers argued that federation would protect them after Britain's withdrawal even though success would make the Political Service redundant.

Thompson also served at Bharatpur, a princely state in Rajasthan adjacent to the Keoladeo Ghana wetland, later designated a national park and UNESCO World Heritage Site.

During the Second World War, Thompson served as Resident for Kolhapur and the Deccan states. On 26 March 1945, he was promoted to Resident for the Punjab States at Lahore, acting as the British Crown's representative in the largely autonomous princely states of Bahawalpur, Kapurthala, Patiala, and others.

Thompson retired from the ICS and returned to the UK in August 1947 when Indian independence brought the disbandment of the Political Service. He was appointed a Companion of the Order of the Indian Empire in January 1945 and was created a knight bachelor in the 1948 New Year Honours.

== Later career and retirement ==
After retiring from the Indian Civil Service, Thompson returned to Britain. He served as general secretary to the London Council of Social Service (1949–1950) and diocesan secretary of the Diocese of Worcester (1951–1953). An enthusiastic oarsman, he volunteered as a coach at Brasenose College Boat Club and was recruited by former civil‑service colleague H. V. Hodson to act as rowing correspondent for The Sunday Times. Thompson wrote on rowing for the paper from 1954 to 1968. He also worked for the BBC appointments department (1956–1959) and later served on the governing body of St Thomas's Hospital and the South West Metropolitan Regional Hospital Board.

A lifelong cyclist, Thompson was known for travelling to regattas by bicycle along the Thames and Cam towpaths. Chronic bronchitis eventually forced him to scale back his activities, but he remained active in charitable work into old age. In addition to his newspaper articles he produced the memoir Icarus Went East, which recounts his experiences as a pilot and civil servant.

== Personal life ==
Thompson married Kathleen Rodier in 1925. She served as Provincial Commissioner of Guides in the Punjab and was awarded the Kaisar‑i‑Hind Silver Medal for public service. Together, they had three daughters.

Thompson died on 28 March 1984, aged 86.

== Legacy ==
Thompson was one of the last senior members of the Indian Political Service to retire before independence. His memoir, wartime reminiscences and letters have been used by historians to illustrate the experiences of early fighter pilots and colonial administrators. Brasenose College remembers him as a genial alumnus who combined devotion to rowing with distinction in public service.

== Collections ==
University College London Special Collections holds letters from Douglas Cockerell to Thompson discussing medieval manuscript bindings.
