= RNAS Caldale =

RNAS Caldale RAF Caldale
- Kirkwall, Orkney, Scotland

Site information
- Type: Military - Airship station
- Owner: Air Department 1915-1918; Air Ministry 1918-1920
- Controlled by: Royal Naval Air Service; Royal Air Force

Location
- Location in Orkney RNAS Caldale (the United Kingdom)
- Coordinates: 58.978°N 3.020°W

Site history
- Built: 1915
- In use: July 1916-1920.
- Battles/wars: First World War

RNAS Caldale is a former Royal Naval Air Service airship station located 2 miles (3.2 km) west of Kirkwall, Orkney and 4 miles (6.4 km) south east of Finstown, Orkney, Scotland. It was constructed in 1915 and was operational from 1916 to 1920.

== History ==
Caldale had two large airship hangars which housed Submarine Scout Pusher airships that operated anti-submarine and mine spotting sweeps near to Orkney.

However, this was fraught was danger as during November 1917 SSP-2 and SSP-4 were both destroyed in high winds with the crew of SSP-4 lost at sea. Not long after these losses and other damage caused to airships due to the wind the Admiralty decided to close the airship station and move the airship further south on mainland Britain.

During January 1918, the airship station became a kite balloon repair station and was home to No. 20 Kite Balloon Base.

== Current use ==
The site is currently open land.

== See also ==
- List of former Royal Air Force stations
