= Alexander MacDonald Shook =

Canadian WWI flying ace (1888–1966)

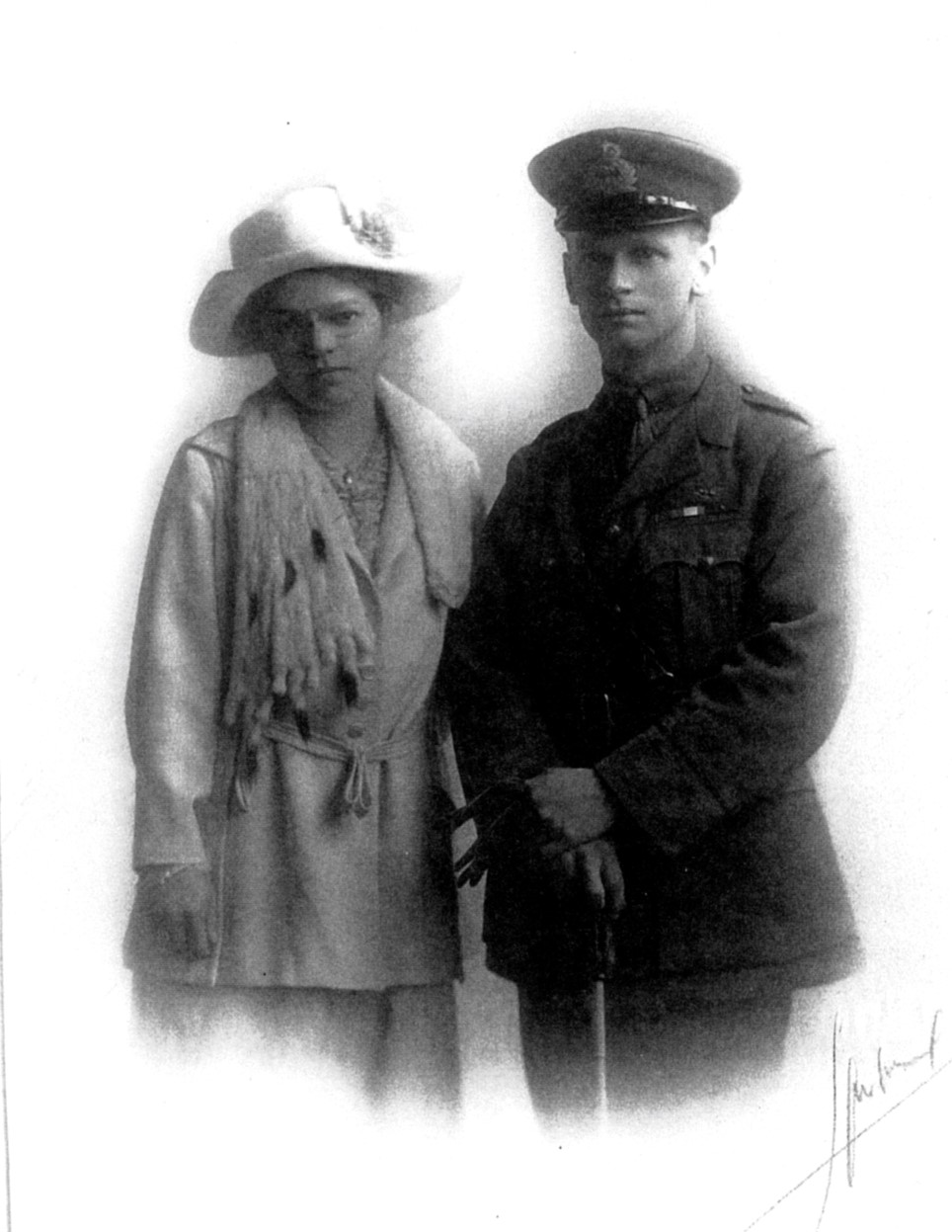
- Born: 2 December 1888; Erindale or Tioga, Ontario, Canada
- Died: 30 May 1966 (aged 77); Bala, Ontario, Canada
- Military career
- Allegiance: United Kingdom
- Branch: Royal Naval Air Service; Royal Air Force
- Rank: Major
- Unit: No. 4 Squadron RNAS
- Conflicts: World War I
- Awards: Distinguished Service Order, Distinguished Service Cross, Air Force Cross, French Croix de Guerre

Major Alexander MacDonald Shook DSO DSC AFC was a Canadian World War I flying ace. During his stint with the Royal Naval Air Service, he was credited with 12 official aerial victories.

== Early life ==
Shook was born in Ontario, Canada on 2 December 1888; the exact town is given as either Erindale or Tioga. He joined the Royal Naval Air Service. At 28 years of age when he reported for duty, he was somewhat older than the majority of his fellow pilots.

== World War I ==
On 15 November 1915, Shook was awarded Aviator's Certificate number 2056 at the completion of his pilot's training on a Curtiss biplane earned at their school in Toronto. He first flew Sopwith two-seater airplanes for No. 5 Naval Wing after his training. "A" Squadron of 5 Wing became No. 4 Squadron RNAS in December 1916, being equipped with Sopwith 1 1/2 Strutters and Sopwith Pups. Shook was transferred to 4 Naval as a founding member and Flight Commander. Flying one of their Pups, serial numbered N6200 but dubbed "Bobs", he scored his first aerial victory during Bloody April, 1917, driving an Albatros D.II down out of control on the 24th. On 9 May, he would use the same Pup to share a victory over a German reconnaissance plane; Langley Frank Willard Smith was the other victorious pilot. Three days later, Shook scored his third and last win in "Bobs", downing a seaplane offshore of Zeebrugge. He then upgraded to a Sopwith Camel.

On 5 June 1917, Shook became the first pilot from Naval 4 to score a victory in one of the new Camels; he destroyed a German Albatros D.III and drove down a two-seater reconnaissance plane above Ostend to become an ace. A month later, on 4 July, he was credited with destroying a Gotha G bomber although the German records do not acknowledge the loss. His efforts earned him a Croix de guerre from a grateful French government on 20 July 1917.

He was also awarded the Distinguished Service Cross on 11 August 1917; the accompanying citation read:

For exceptional gallantry and remarkable skill and courage whilst serving with the R.N.A.S. at Dunkirk during May and June, 1917, in repeatedly attacking and destroying hostile aircraft.

On 18 August 1917, he was credited with a win over an Albatros D.V. He would score once more in 1917, being credited with victory over an Albatros D.III on 21 October, he was wounded in action during this dogfight. He would not return to action until January 1918.

On 1 January 1918, King George V appointed Shook as a Companion of the Distinguished Service Order "in recognition of...services in the prosecution of the war."

In March 1918, Shook resumed his winning ways. On the 11th, he was credited with an Albatros D.V; on the 22nd, he downed three more over Slype, including German ace Bertram Heinrich. This ended his victory tally; it included seven enemy airplanes destroyed and five driven down out of control.

Shook added an Air Force Cross to his awards after the RNAS was subsumed into the new Royal Air Force on 1 April 1918. Shook emerged from the war as a major.

== Post World War I ==
Shook died in Bala, Canada on 30 May 1966.
