= Hans Waldhausen =

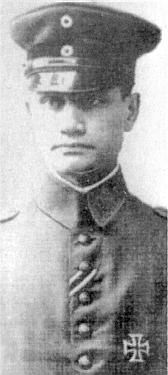
- Born: 30 January 1892; Mainz, German Empire
- Died: 6 November 1976 (aged 84)
- Military career
- Allegiance: Germany
- Branch: Luftstreitkräfte
- Service years: 1911-ca 1919; World War II
- Rank: Oberleutnant
- Nickname: "The Eagle of Lens"
- Unit: Feldflieger Abteilung (Field Flier Detachment) 53, Jagdstaffel 37
- Awards: Iron Cross (both classes)
- Other work: Senior military judge in the World War II Luftwaffe

Oberleutnant Hans Waldhausen was a World War I flying ace credited with six confirmed aerial victories in eight days. He was forced down and captured after his sixth victory.

Waldhausen studied law after World War I and became a judge. He joined the Luftwaffe for World War II, serving as a military judge.

== Biography ==
Hans Waldhausen was born in Mainz on 30 January 1892. In Spring 1911, he joined the 1st Guards Field Artillery Regiment. He also served with the 4 Guards Field Artillery Regiment. When World War I began, he had moved on to the 76th Baden Field Artillery Regiment and been commissioned a Leutnant.

Waldhausen was wounded in September 1914, but returned to duty and succeeded in winning the Iron Cross Second Class in December 1914. During Summer 1915, he transferred to aviation duty.

His original flying assignment was to Flieger-Abteilung (Flier Detachment) 53 as an aerial observer. In the Summer of 1916, he was sent to pilot's training with Fliegerersatz-Abteilung (Replacement Detachment) 4 in Posen. Once trained, Waldhausen returned to reconnaissance duty with a Bavarian unit, Flieger-Abteilung 9.

After service with FA 9, he was forwarded to Jastaschule 1 (Fighter School 1) in Valenciennes, France. Fighter training completed, he joined a fighter squadron, Jagdstaffel 37, on 26 July 1917. There he was assigned Albatros D.V serial number 2284/17, which he had emblazoned with a star and crescent motif. Flying this aircraft on the Western Front, he was soon dubbed "The Eagle of Lens".

Waldhausen scored his first aerial victory on 19 September 1917, downing a Sopwith 1 1/2 Strutter from the Royal Flying Corps' 43 Squadron over Fresnes at 0730 hours. A second claim that day, for a Martinsyde Elephant, went unconfirmed.

Five days later, on 24 September, Waldhausen did shoot down a Martinsyde Elephant over Cagnicourt at 1445 hours. The next day, on an evening sortie, he shot down an enemy observation balloon in flames over Béthune on the French/Belgian border.

On 27 September 1917, Waldhausen ignited and destroyed another observation balloon southwest of Roulette at 1705 hours, followed five minutes later by a 9 Squadron Royal Aircraft Factory RE.8 sent into Farbus Wood. At 1815 hours, Waldhausen flamed another balloon at Neuville-Saint-Vaast. Shortly thereafter, he came into combat with a number of British aircraft, and was shot down, although he survived, badly wounded. It has been suggested that Waldhausen was a victim of Charles Dawson Booker and Philip Tudhope, although Herbert Thompson (later Sir Herbert Thompson) was credited with the "kill". Waldhausen went off to a prisoner of war camp. His still-usable aircraft was renumbered by the Royal Flying Corps as serial number G74.

Oberleutnant Waldhausen, who had won the First Class Iron Cross at some time, sat out the war. Postwar, he studied law. He became a judge.

During World War II, Waldhausen returned to aviation duty as a military judge in the Luftwaffe. He was assigned variously to the staffs of Jagdgeschwader 51, Jagdgeschwader 54, and Luftflotte 1. In 1943, he became a senior judge.

Hans Waldhausen survived this war also; he died on 6 November 1976.
