= Little Wormwood Scrubs =

Park in London, England

Coordinates: 51.5236°N 0.2288°W

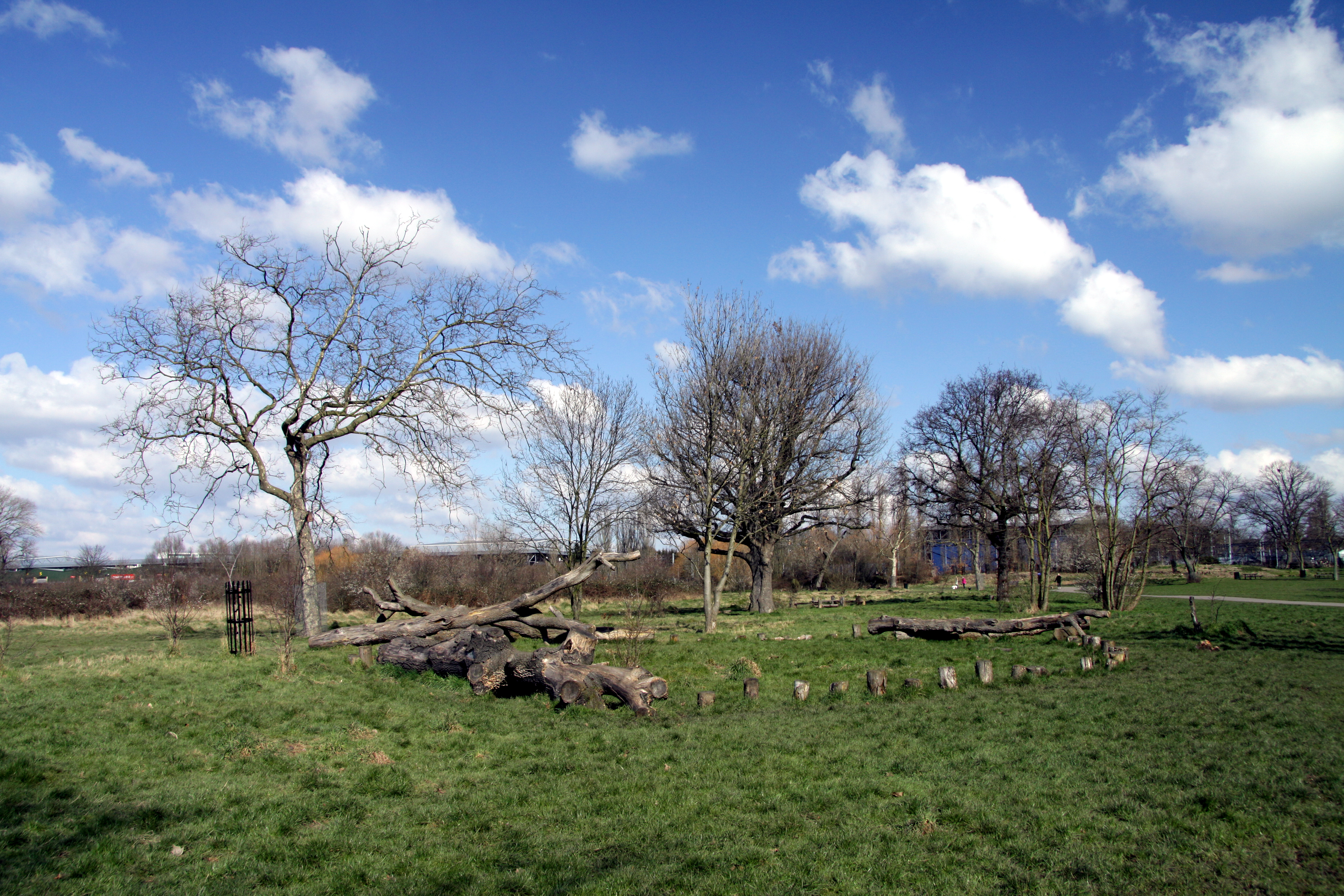
- Little Wormwood Scrubs
- Interactive map of Little Wormwood Scrubs
- Location: Hammersmith and Fulham, London, England

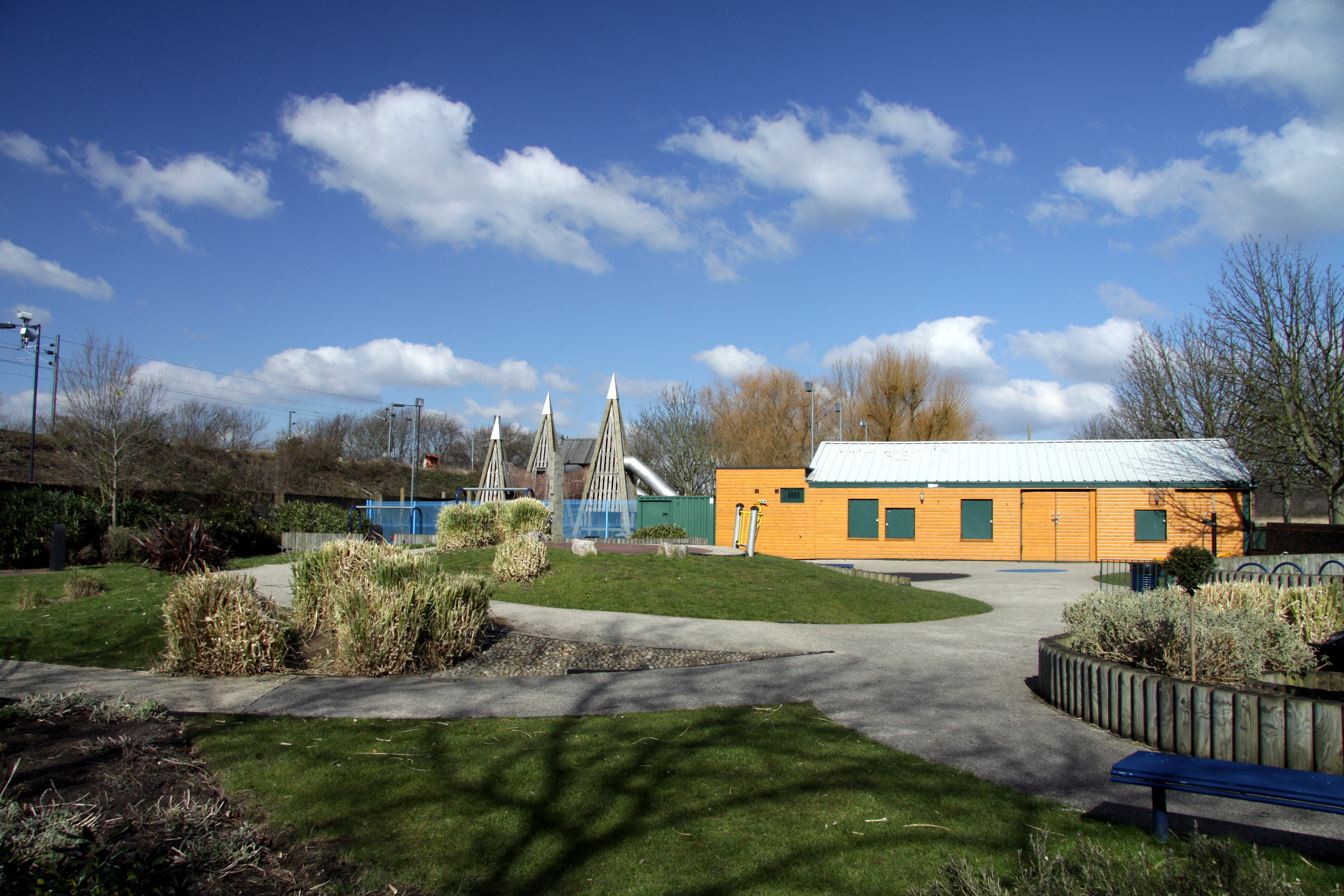
Playground in park

Little Wormwood Scrubs is a park in Kensal Green on the border of Hammersmith and Fulham and Royal Borough of Kensington and Chelsea. Counter's Creek, a now subterranean stream that arises in Kensal Green flows south through the park, eventually joining the River Thames.

== History ==
Little Wormwood Scrubs was originally part of Wormwood Scrubs, and separated from it in the 1840s when the railway embankment of the West London line was built.

In 1870, the northwest part of the land was exchanged for land to the south east;

== Little Wormwood Scrubs today ==
In 2005, an unexploded terrorist bomb was discovered in the park. Part of the 21 July 2005 London bombings, it was made safe by the police using a controlled explosion.

== See also ==
- North Pole depot, railway depot to the north of both Wormwood Scrubs, and Little Wormwood Scrubs
- Nearby places
  - White City, London
  - Kensal Green
  - North Kensington
