= Langley Frank Willard Smith =

Canadian World War I flying ace

Langley Frank Willard Smith DSC
- Born: 15 August 1897; Saint-Armand, Quebec, Canada
- Died: 12 June 1917 (aged 19) near Bruges-Ghent
- Burial place: Houtave Churchyard, Zuienkerke, West-Vlaanderen, Belgium
- Military career
- Allegiance: Canada; United Kingdom
- Branch: Royal Flying Corps; Royal Naval Air Service
- Rank: Flight Sub-Lieutenant
- Unit: 4 Naval Squadron
- Conflicts: World War I †
- Awards: Distinguished Service Cross; Croix de Guerre; Order of the Crown (Belgium)

Langley Frank Willard Smith DSC (15 August 1897 – 12 June 1917) was a Canadian Flying Ace in World War I credited with 8 victories.

== Background ==
Smith was born in Philipsburg, in the Province of Quebec, and was brought up by his grandmother, his father having been widowed. Whilst attending Flying School in St. Augustine, Florida, Smith accidentally stepped into a revolving propeller and received near-fatal head injuries. However he completed his training at the Curtiss Flying School in Newport News, Virginia, qualifying as a pilot on 29 June 1916.

== Involvement in World War 1 ==
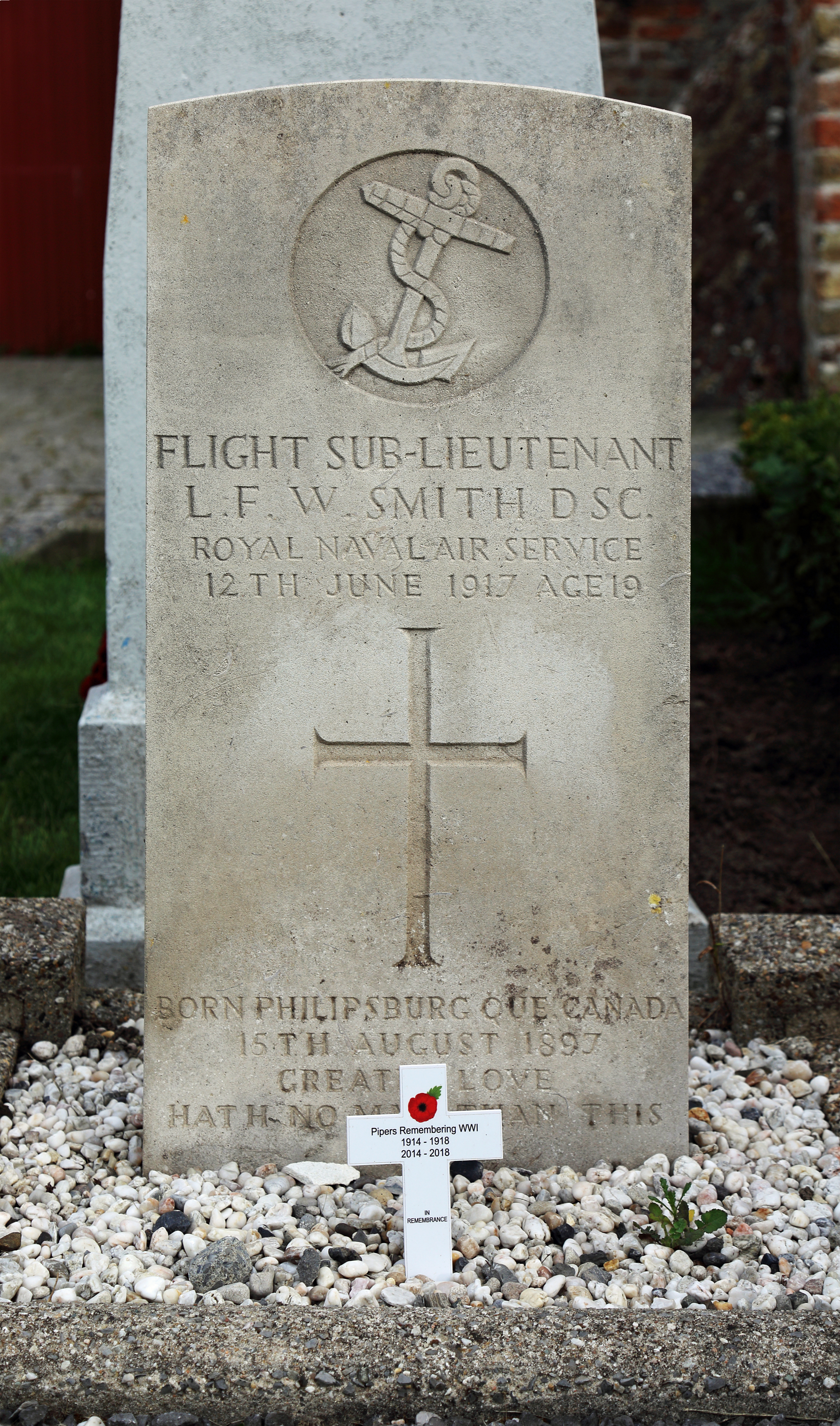
Gravestone of L. F. W. Smith, Houtave Churchyard, Belgium

Posted to 4 Naval Squadron on 25 April 1917, he scored eight victories flying the Sopwith Pup. In June 1917, his squadron was the first to receive the new Sopwith Camel. A few days later, while attempting to intercept a flight of 16 Gotha bombers, Smith was killed when his Camel lost a wing and broke up in mid-air.

He is buried in the Houtave Churchyard, Zuienkerke, West-Vlaanderen, Belgium.

== Decorations ==
- Distinguished Service Cross
- Belgian Croix de guerre
- Chevalier de l'Ordre de la Couronne (Knight of the Order of the Crown)
