= Linford Christie Stadium =

Athletics stadium in West London, England

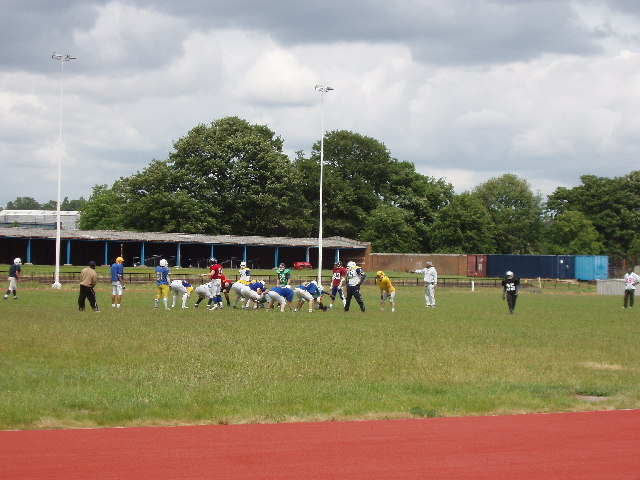
- Training for an American football team taking place at the stadium in 2005
- Interactive map of Linford Christie Stadium
- Location: Wormwood Scrubs, West London, W12 0DF, England
- Coordinates: 51°31′10″N 0°14′08″W

Construction
- Opened: 1967

The Linford Christie Stadium previously the West London Stadium is an athletics stadium in Wormwood Scrubs, West London, England.

== History ==
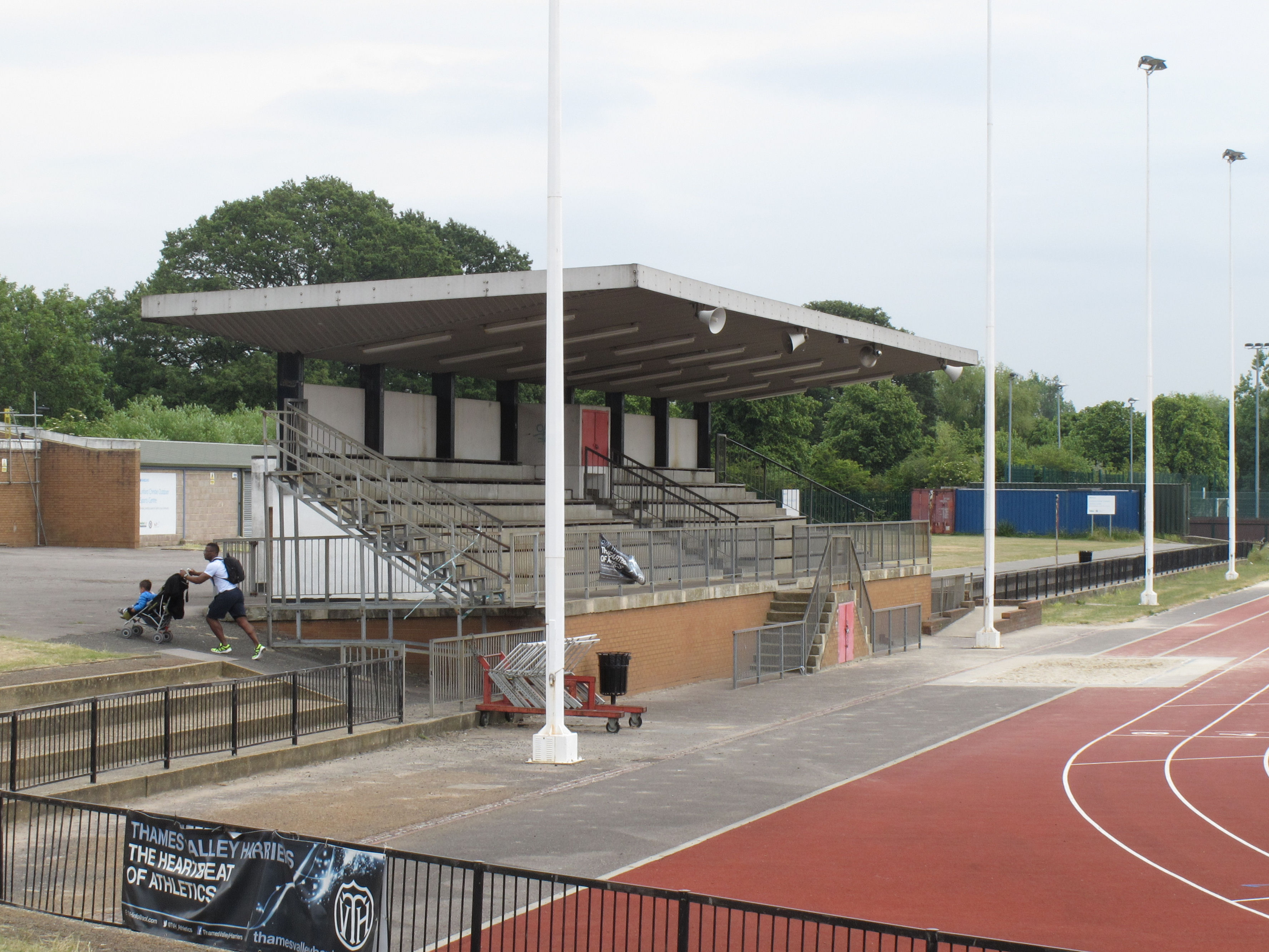
The main stand

The venue first opened as the West London Stadium in 1967. It initially had a cinder running track, which was upgraded to a synthetic surface in 1973.

The Thames Valley Harriers and the London Olympiades Athletic Club both moved to the stadium from their Alperton Sports Ground in 1968.

In 1993 the stadium was renamed after Olympic 100 metres gold medallist Linford Christie, who often trained at the venue with the Thames Valley Harriers.

The stadium was redeveloped further between 2004 and 2006, when additional facilities for sports including football, rugby and hockey were installed. The work was funded by London Borough of Hammersmith and Fulham, the Football Foundation, Chelsea F.C. and Barclays. Chelsea players John Terry and Shaun Wright-Phillips attended the re-opening. The video for "So Many Roads" by Example was filmed here in 2007.

As part of the £1m Coronation Youth Fund, the stadium was awarded £250,000 towards a refurbishment including new floodlights and resurfacing of their two athletics tracks. Works commenced in 2024.

The ground has also been used by the London Blitz American Football club. and Kensington Dragons FC.

In 2024, Hammersmith and Fulham Council revealed plans to knock down the changing rooms and replace them with portacabins as an 8 to 10 year solution, at a cost of £1.25 million.
