= Royal Naval Air Service =

Aerial warfare arm of the British Royal Navy (1914–1918)

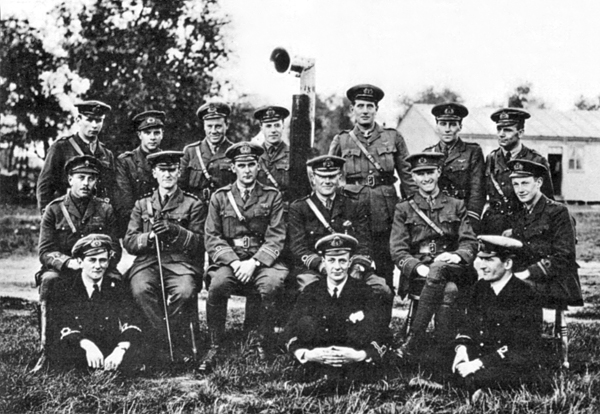
Personnel of No 1 Squadron RNAS in late 1914

The Royal Naval Air Service (RNAS) was the air arm of the Royal Navy, under the direction of the Admiralty's Air Department, and existed formally from 1 July 1914, to 1 April 1918, when it was merged with the British Army's Royal Flying Corps to form the Royal Air Force (RAF).

It was replaced by the Fleet Air Arm, initially consisting of those RAF units that normally operated from ships, but emerging as a separate unit similar to the original RNAS by the time of the Second World War.

== History ==
=== Background ===
On 21 July 1908 Captain Reginald Bacon, who was a member of the Aerial Navigation Sub-Committee, submitted to the First Sea Lord Sir John Fisher that a rigid airship based on the German Zeppelin be designed and constructed by the firm of Vickers. After much discussion on the Committee of Imperial Defence the suggestion was approved on 7 May 1909. Though Bacon had been intended as the Superintendent of Construction, his departure from the Royal Navy in November 1909 saw the role fall to his protégé at the Naval Ordnance Department, Captain Murray Sueter. Consequently, Sueter was the first Royal Navy officer assigned to a naval air project.

On 21 June 1910, Lieutenant George Colmore became the first qualified pilot in the Royal Navy. After completing training, which Colmore paid for out of his own pocket, he was issued with Royal Aero Club Certificate Number 15.

In November 1910, the Royal Aero Club, thanks to one of its members, Francis McClean, offered the Royal Navy two aircraft with which to train its first pilots. The club also offered its members as instructors and the use of its airfield at Eastchurch on the Isle of Sheppey. The Admiralty accepted and on 6 December the Commander-in-Chief, The Nore promulgated the scheme to the officers under his jurisdiction and requested that applicants be unmarried and able to pay the membership fees of the Royal Aero Club. The airfield became the Naval Flying School, Eastchurch. Two hundred applications were received, and four were accepted: Lieutenant Charles Samson, Lieutenant Arthur Longmore, Lieutenant R. Gregory and Lieutenant E. L. Gerrard, RMLI.

=== Formation ===
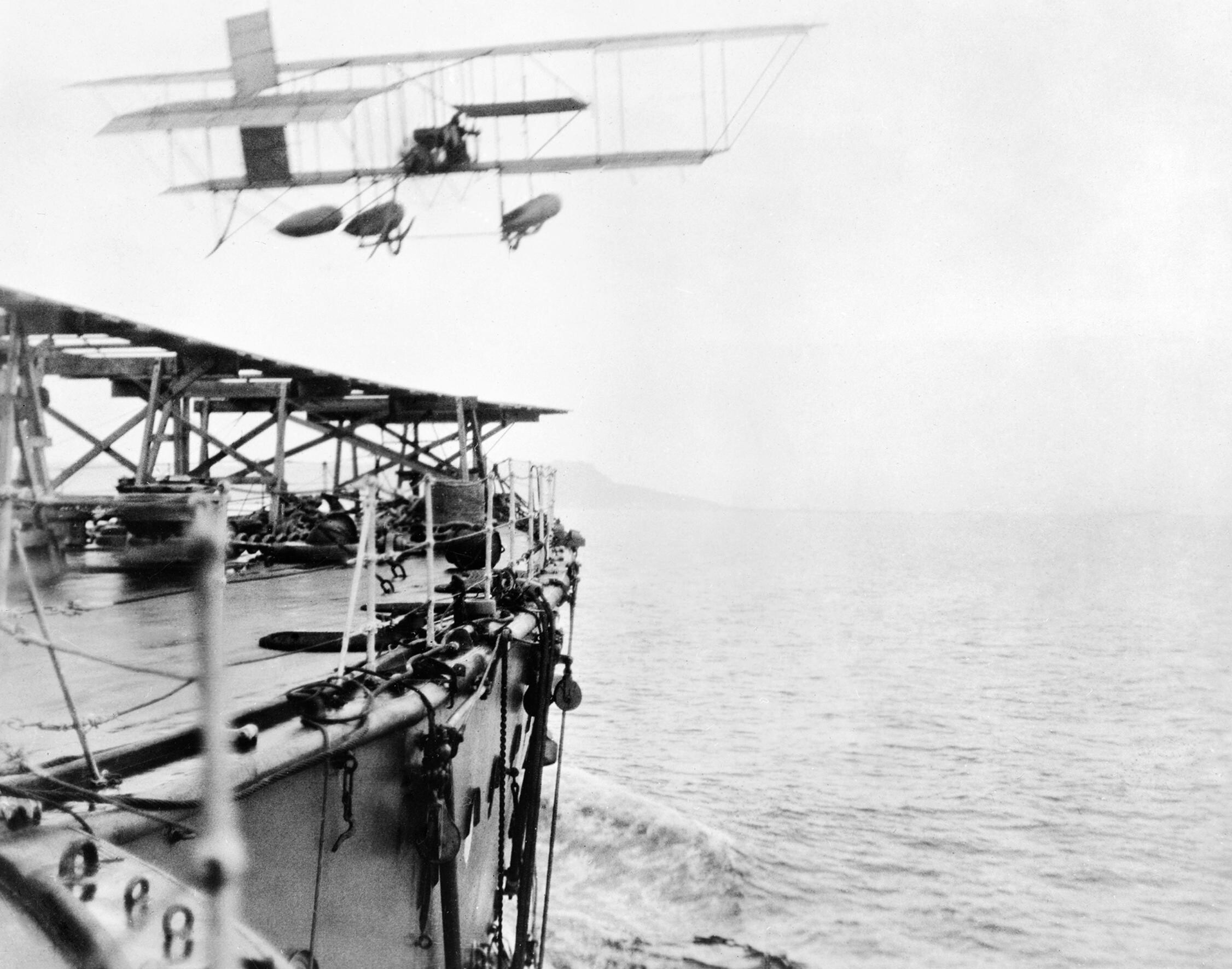
Commander C. Samson of the RNAS takes off from HMS Hibernia in his modified Shorts S.38 “hydro-aeroplane” to be the first pilot to take off from a ship underway at sea - 9 May 1912.

After prolonged discussion on the Committee of Imperial Defence, the Royal Flying Corps was constituted by Royal Warrant on 13 April 1912. It absorbed the nascent naval air detachment and also the Air Battalion of the Royal Engineers. It consisted of two wings with the Military Wing making up the Army element and Naval Wing, under Commander C. R. Samson. A Central Flying School staffed by officers and men of both the navy and the army was created at Upavon for the pilot training of both wings, and opened on 19 June 1912 under the command of Captain Godfrey Paine, a naval officer. The Naval Wing, by the terms of its inception was permitted to carry out experimentation at its flying school at Eastchurch. The Royal Flying Corps, although formed of two separate branches, allowed for direct entry to either branch through a joint Special Reserve of Officers, although soon the Navy inducted new entries into the Royal Naval Reserve. In the summer of 1912, in recognition of the air branch's expansion, Captain Murray Sueter was appointed Director of the newly formed Air Department at the Admiralty. Sueter's remit as outlined in September 1912 stated that he was responsible to the Admiralty for "all matters connected with the Naval Air Service."

In the same month as the Air Department was set up, four naval seaplanes participated in Army Manoeuvres. In 1913 a seaplane base on the Isle of Grain and an airship base at Kingsnorth were approved for construction. The same year provision was made in the naval estimates for eight airfields to be constructed, and for the first time aircraft participated in manoeuvres with the Royal Navy, using the converted cruiser Hermes as a seaplane carrier. On 16 April ten officers of the naval service graduated from the Central Flying School. As of 7 June 44 officers and 105 other ranks had been trained at the Central Flying School and at Eastchurch, and 35 officers and men had been trained in airship work. Three non-rigid airships built for the army, the Willows, Astra-Torres and the Parseval were taken over by the navy. On 1 July 1914, the Admiralty made the Royal Naval Air Service, forming the Naval Wing of the Royal Flying Corps, part of the Military Branch of the Royal Navy. Promotions to the rank were first gazetted on 30 June 1914.

=== First World War ===
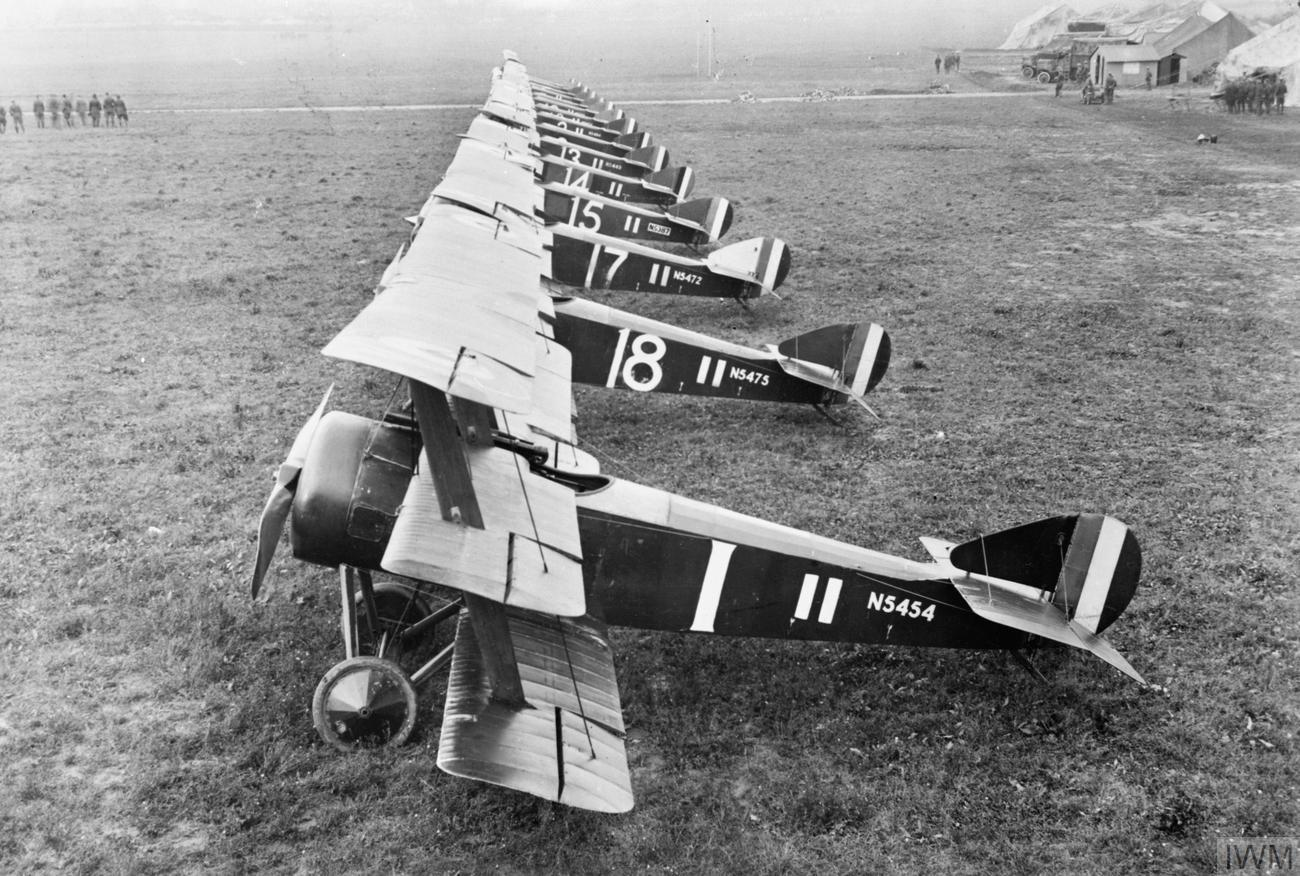
Sopwith Triplanes from No. 1 (Naval) Squadron, in Bailleul, France. The aircraft nearest the camera (N5454) was primarily flown by ace Richard Minifie.

By the outbreak of the First World War in August 1914, the RNAS had 93 aircraft, six airships, two balloons and 727 personnel. The Navy maintained twelve airship stations around the coast of Britain from Longside, Aberdeenshire, in the northeast to Anglesey in the west. On 1 August 1915 the Royal Naval Air Service officially came under the control of the Royal Navy. In addition to seaplanes, carrier-borne aircraft, and other aircraft with a legitimate "naval" application the RNAS also maintained several crack fighter squadrons on the Western Front, as well as allocating scarce resources to an independent strategic bombing force at a time when such operations were highly speculative. Inter-service rivalry even affected aircraft procurement. Urgently required Sopwith 1½ Strutter two-seaters had to be transferred from the planned RNAS strategic bombing force to RFC squadrons on the Western Front because the Sopwith firm were contracted to supply the RNAS exclusively. This situation continued, although most of Sopwith's post-1915 products were not designed specifically as naval aircraft. Thus RNAS fighter squadrons obtained Sopwith Pup fighters months before the RFC, and then replaced these first with Sopwith Triplanes and then Camels while the hard-pressed RFC squadrons soldiered on with their obsolescent Pups.

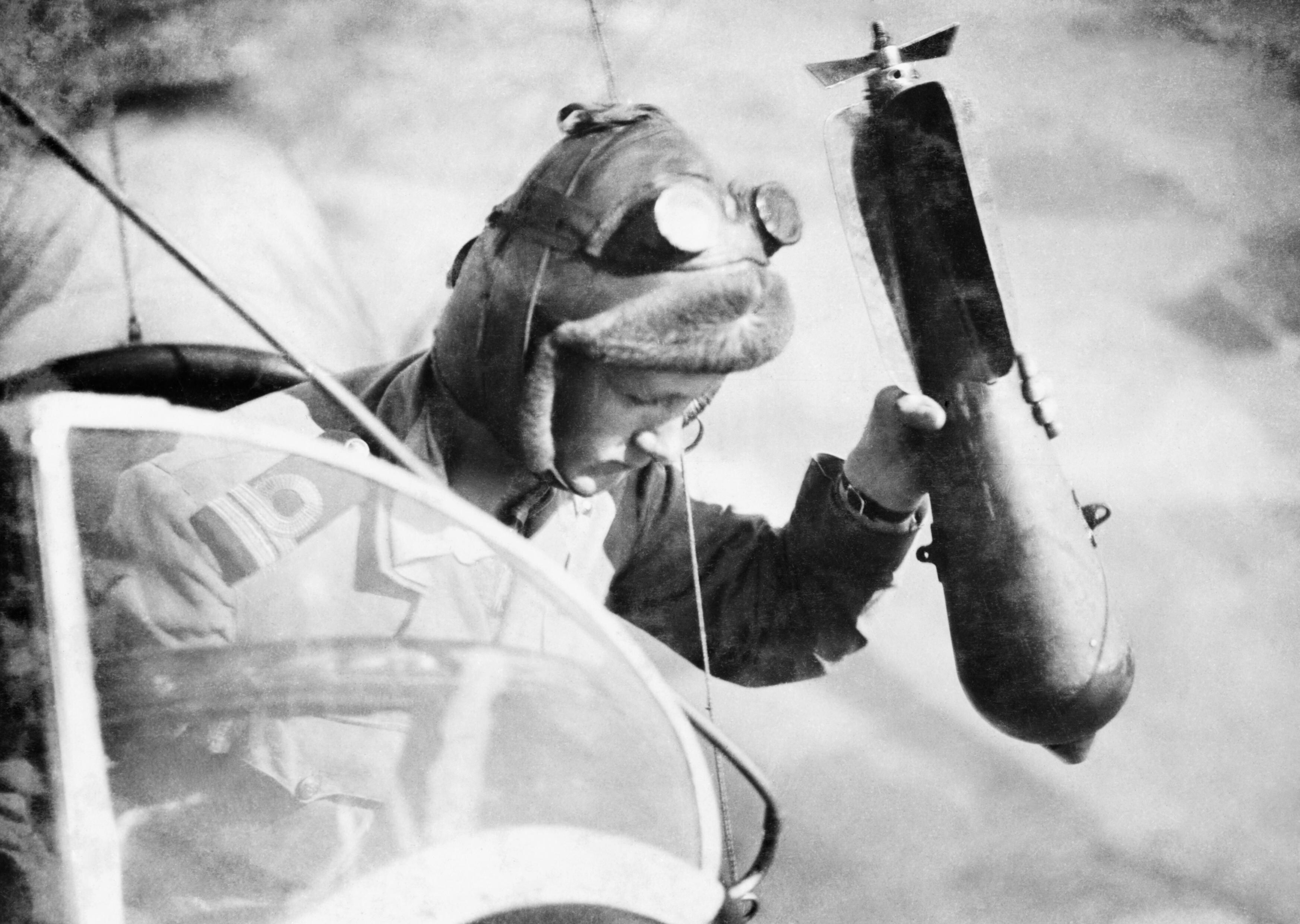
RNAS officer dropping a bomb from a SSZ class airship during the First World War.

On 23 June 1917, after the Second Battle of Gaza, RNAS aircraft attacked Tulkarm in the Judean Hills.

On 1 April 1918, the RNAS was merged with the RFC to form the Royal Air Force.

At the time of the merger, the Navy's air service had 55,066 officers and men, 2,949 aircraft, 103 airships and 126 coastal stations.

The RNAS squadrons were absorbed into the new structure, individual squadrons receiving new squadron numbers by effectively adding 200 to the number so No. 1 Squadron RNAS (a famous fighter squadron) became No. 201 Squadron RAF.

The Royal Navy regained its own air service in 1937, when the Fleet Air Arm of the Royal Air Force (covering carrier borne aircraft, but not the seaplanes and maritime reconnaissance aircraft of Coastal Command) was returned to Admiralty control and renamed the Naval Air Branch. In 1952, the service returned to its pre-1937 name of the Fleet Air Arm.

== Roles and missions ==
The main "naval" roles of the RNAS (ignoring for the minute the service's direct field "support" of the RFC) were fleet reconnaissance, patrolling coasts for enemy ships and submarines, and attacking enemy coastal territory. The RNAS systematically searched 4,000 square miles (10,000 km^{2}) of the Channel, the North Sea and the vicinity of the Strait of Gibraltar for U-boats. In 1917 alone, they sighted 175 U-boats and attacked 107. Because of the technology of the time the attacks were not very successful in terms of submarines sunk, but the sightings greatly assisted the Navy's surface fleets in combatting the enemy submarines.

It was the RNAS which provided much of the mobile cover using armoured cars, during the withdrawal from Antwerp to the Yser, in 1914 (see RNAS Armoured Car Section below). Later in the war, squadrons of the RNAS were sent to France to directly support the RFC. The RNAS was also at one stage entrusted with the air defence of London. This led to its raids on airship stations in Germany, in places as far from the sea as the manufacturing site at Friedrichshafen.

Before techniques were developed for taking off and landing on ships, the RNAS had to use seaplanes in order to operate at sea. Beginning with experiments on the old cruiser HMS Hermes, special seaplane tenders were developed to support these aircraft. It was from these ships that a raid on Zeppelin bases at Cuxhaven, Nordholz Airbase and Wilhelmshaven was launched on Christmas Day of 1914. This was the first attack by British ship-borne aircraft; the first ship-borne aircraft raid was launched by the Japanese seaplane carrier Wakamiya on 6 September. A chain of coastal air stations was also constructed. This was followed with the Tondern raid, again against Zeppelins, which was the first instance of carrier launched aircraft.

== Notable personnel ==
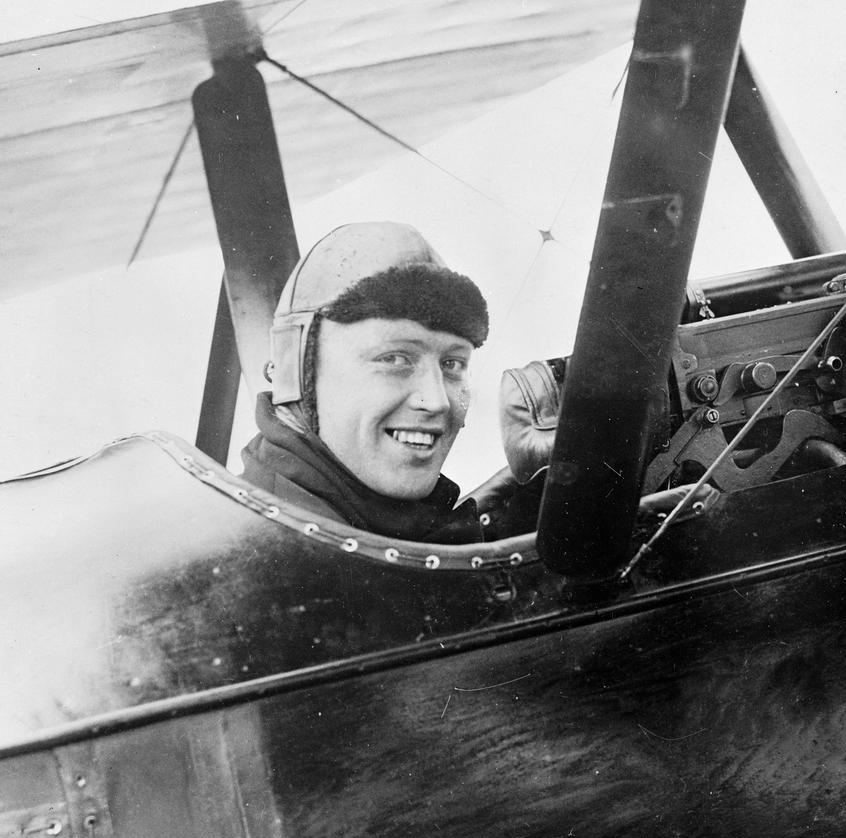
Raymond Collishaw

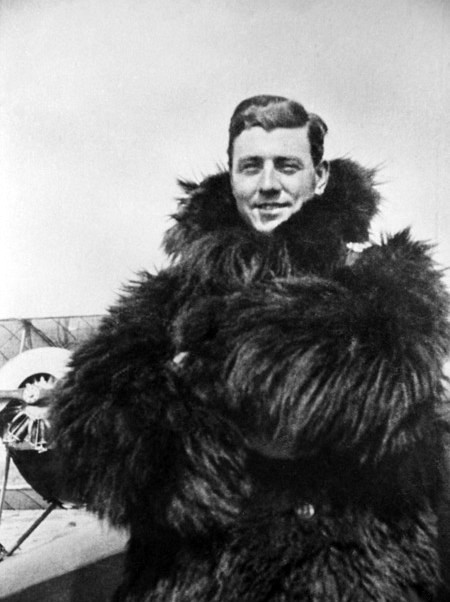
Roderic Dallas

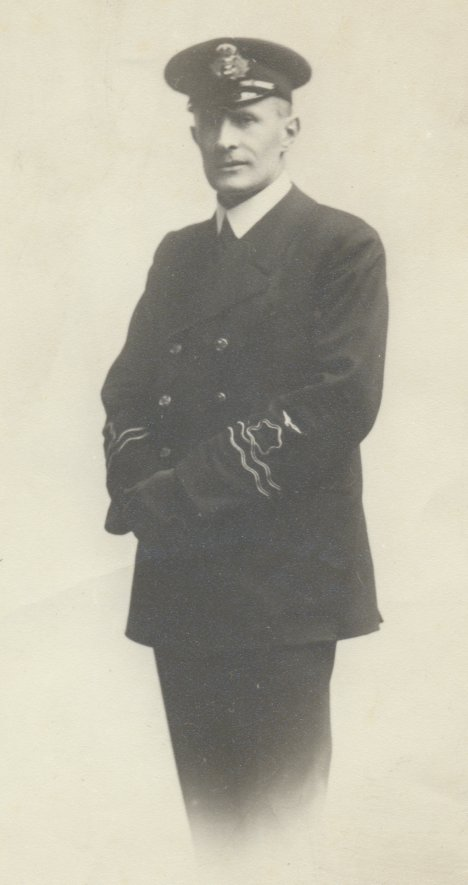
Archie Low

- John Alcock – aviation pioneer
- Henry Allingham – mechanic – oldest man in the world from June to July 2009 and the last surviving member of the RNAS
- Richard Bell-Davies – 3 Squadron – awarded the Victoria Cross
- Noel Pemberton Billing – aviator, inventor, publisher and Member of Parliament.
- Norman Blackburn – aviation pioneer and joint managing director of Blackburn Aircraft
- Henry John Lawrence Botterell – Naval 8 – longest surviving First World War fighter pilot (he died 3 January 2003 at age 106)
- Frederick Bowhill – Squadron commander in Wing 2, later Commander-in-chief Transport Command RAF. Air Chief Marshal
- Arthur Roy Brown – Naval 9 – ace, officially credited with shooting down the Red Baron (although this is now generally discredited)
- Egbert Cadbury – credited with shooting down two Zeppelin over the North Sea
- Arnold Jacques Chadwick – DSC – Naval 4 ace on two types of aircraft: Sopwith Pup and Sopwith Camel
- Erskine Childers – author of The Riddle of the Sands and famous Irish republican, later executed by the Irish Free State for his service in the Anti-Treaty IRA. Father of Erskine Childers, fourth President of Ireland.
- Raymond Collishaw – Naval 10 – top RNAS ace, with 60 victories
- Roderic Dallas – Commanding Officer of No. 1 Squadron RNAS, ace with over 32 victories.
- David Grahame Donald – International rugby player and Air Marshall
- Grahame Donald – Aviator at Jutland
- Christopher Draper – 3 Wing 6 Naval, Naval 8 – "The Mad Major"
- Sir William Dickson – the only RNAS junior officer to later serve as either Chief of the Air Staff or Chief of the Defence Staff
- Walter Dicketts - MI5 British double agent "CELERY" 1941-1943
- Edwin Harris Dunning – landed a Sopwith Pup on the deck of HMS Furious in 1917, to become the first person to land an aeroplane on a moving ship.
- Stanley Goble – commanded No. 5 Squadron, ace with ten victories, was awarded the Distinguished Service Order and the Distinguished Service Cross, later to become Chief of the Air Staff of the Royal Australian Air Force
- Tommy Handley – comedian, mainly known for the BBC radio programme It's That Man Again ("ITMA").
- Hugh Grosvenor, 2nd Duke of Westminster – held rank of Temporary Commander RNVR while commanding 2 Squadron, RNACS
- Robert Marsland Groves – Officer Commanding No. 1 Squadron RNAS
- Bert Hinkler – Australian aviation pioneer
- Robert Leckie – Canadian pilot who became an Air Marshal in the Royal Canadian Air Force
- Robert A. Little – Australia's top scoring ace of the First World War, with 47 victories
- Oliver Locker-Lampson – Conservative Member of Parliament, commanded 15 Squadron (armoured cars) and led the Russian Armoured Car Division
- Arthur Longmore – early Naval aviator, Officer Commanding No. 3 Squadron RNAS, and Officer Commanding No. 1 Squadron RNAS
- Archie Low – British aeronautics pioneer and early flying instructor. Designer of the Vickers F.B.5. and Vickers E.F.B.1.. Served on HMS Engadine and HMS Ben-my-Chree 1915 to 1916
- Edward Maitland – aviation pioneer, Officer Commanding the Captive Balloon Detachment
- Anthony Jacques Mantle – awarded the Distinguished Flying Cross for services over Turkey
- Robert McCance – later Professor of Experimental Medicine, Cambridge University
- Francis McClean – Irish civil engineer and pioneer aviator
- Francis McLaren – Liberal MP, youngest son of Lord Aberconway
- Edgar Middleton – playwright and author
- Edwin Moon – aviation pioneer, awarded the DSO. Forced landing in East Africa, led to capture by German forces
- Ivor Novello – entertainer
- Richard Peirse – later Air Chief Marshal Sir Richard Peirse, KCB, DSO, AFC, AOC Palestine/Trans Jordan 1933–36, C-in-C Bomber Command 1940–42, C-in-C RAF India 1942–44, C-in-C SEAC air forces from creation until 1944.
- John Cyril Porte – aviation pioneer and aircraft designer, Station Commander Hendon Aerodrome and RNAS Felixstowe.
- Charles Rumney Samson – initial commandant of the RFC Naval Wing, led the first armoured car units on the Western Front, later Air Officer Commanding RAF units in the Mediterranean
- William Forbes-Sempill, 19th Lord Sempill – air pioneer
- Alexander MacDonald Shook – flying ace of Naval 4 and recipient of the Distinguished Service Order, Distinguished Service Cross, Air Force Cross and Croix de Guerre
- Ivan Stedeford – industrialist
- Murray Sueter – pioneer of naval aviation
- Sir Frederick Sykes – initial commander of RFC Military Wing, officer commanding RNAS at Gallipoli & later, controller-general of Civil Aviation and Governor of Bombay
- Adrian Tonks – flying ace of Naval 4, winner of two Distinguished Flying Crosses
- Taunton Elliott Viney – credited with bombing a U Boat off Middelkerke and was awarded the D.S.O.
- Barnes Wallis – engineer, designer of the R9 and R80 airships, famed for the bouncing bomb
- Reginald Alexander John Warneford – awarded the Victoria Cross
- Josiah Wedgwood – awarded the D.S.O., commanded the machine guns on the SS River Clyde
- John Weston – South Africa's first aviator. First World War service in France, Eastern Mediterranean (Mudros, Lemnos) and with British Naval Mission to Greece
- Claude Grahame White – aviation pioneer
- James White – Naval 8 – ace
- Tony Wilding – New Zealand World number 1 tennis player for 1912 and 1913; later an RNACD armoured car commander, killed on the Western Front in 1915
- Sir Herbert Thompson - credited with shooting down Hans Waldhausen in 1917, going on to a career in the Indian Civil Service.

== Naval vessels ==
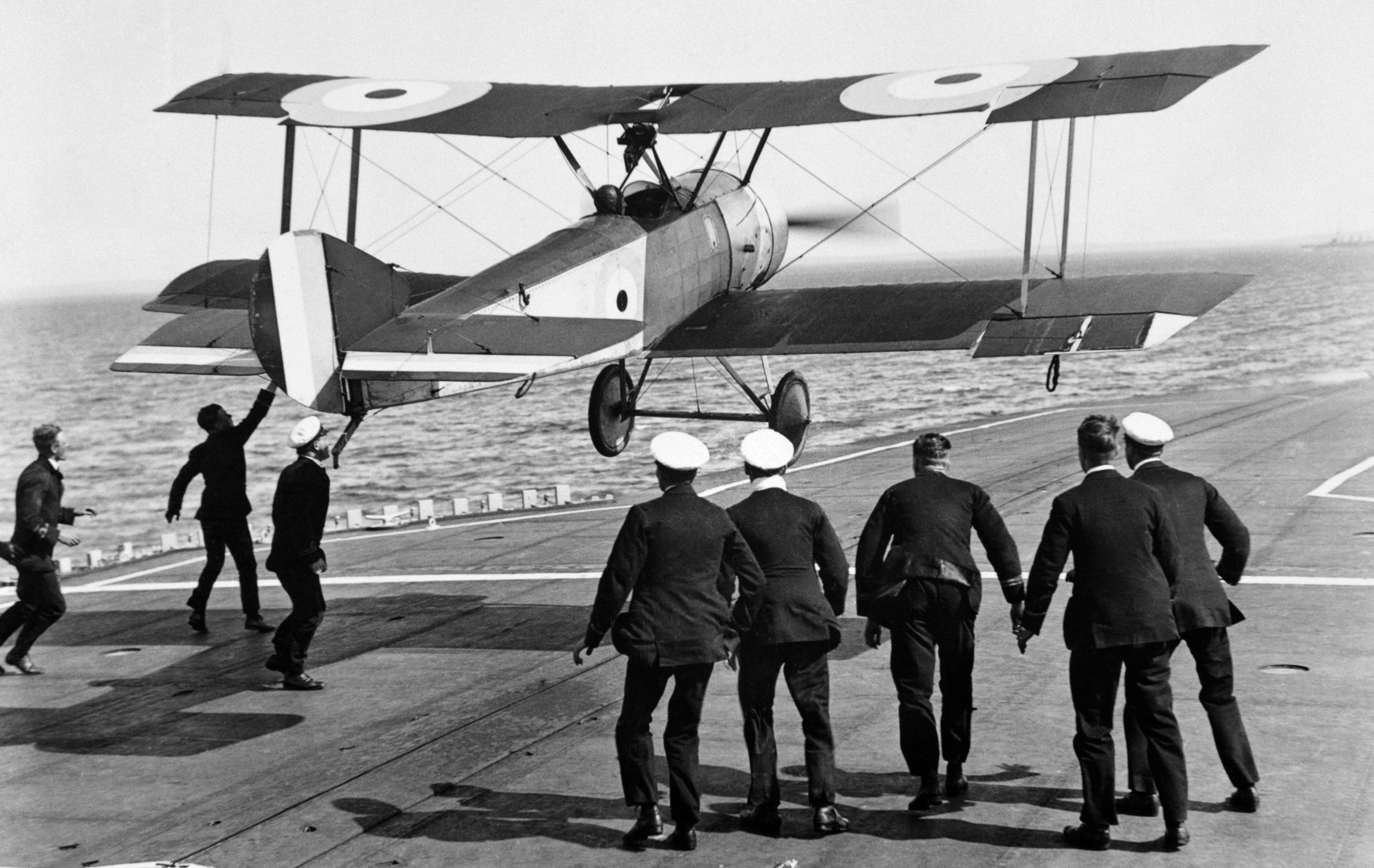
Squadron Commander E. H. Dunning attempting to land his Sopwith Pup on the flying-off deck of HMS Furious, Scapa Flow, 7 August 1917. He was killed on another attempt later that day when his aircraft veered off the flight deck and into the sea.

- HMS Hermes, a light cruiser converted into a seaplane carrier. Sunk by German U-boat U-27 on 31 October 1914.
- HMS Empress, HMS Engadine, HMS Riviera, HMS Vindex and HMS Manxman, all converted Channel ferries. The first three ships each carrying three seaplanes were the "striking force" of the first naval air attack, the raid on Cuxhaven on 25 December 1914. HMS Vindex had a take-off ramp fitted and was the first operational ship to launch a wheeled aircraft.
- HMS Ben-my-Chree, a fast Isle of Man ferry converted to a seaplane carrier that served in the Gallipoli Campaign. Ben-My-Chree supplied the aircraft that made the first successful aerial torpedo attack against ships. A Short seaplane flown by Flt Cdr C. H. K. Edmonds carried a 14-inch torpedo between the floats which was dropped from a height of 15 feet, hitting and sinking a Turkish ship. Ben-my-Chree was sunk by Turkish artillery in 1917, but without loss of life.
- HMS Ark Royal also served at Gallipoli, and continued service after 1918. She was renamed Pegasus in 1934, to release the name for the new modern aircraft carrier Ark Royal.
- HMS Campania was an ex-Cunard liner. Although she was much larger than those before her, the 120 foot take-off ramp was not sufficient for wheeled aircraft to take off. She sank in the Firth of Forth 5 November 1918, after a collision with HMS Royal Oak.
- HMS Manica, a converted tramp steamer equipped with the Navy's first kite balloon observation platform for gunnery spotting during the Dardanelles campaign.
- HMS Nairana, a converted passenger ship with a take-off ramp.
- HMS Furious, a converted battlecruiser, with an 18-inch gun aft and a flying-off deck forward. She was rebuilt as a through-deck carrier after 1918 and served in World War II.
- HMS Argus, laid down as the Italian liner Conte Rosso in 1914, was completed as a carrier with a full flight deck in September 1918.

== Armoured Car Division ==
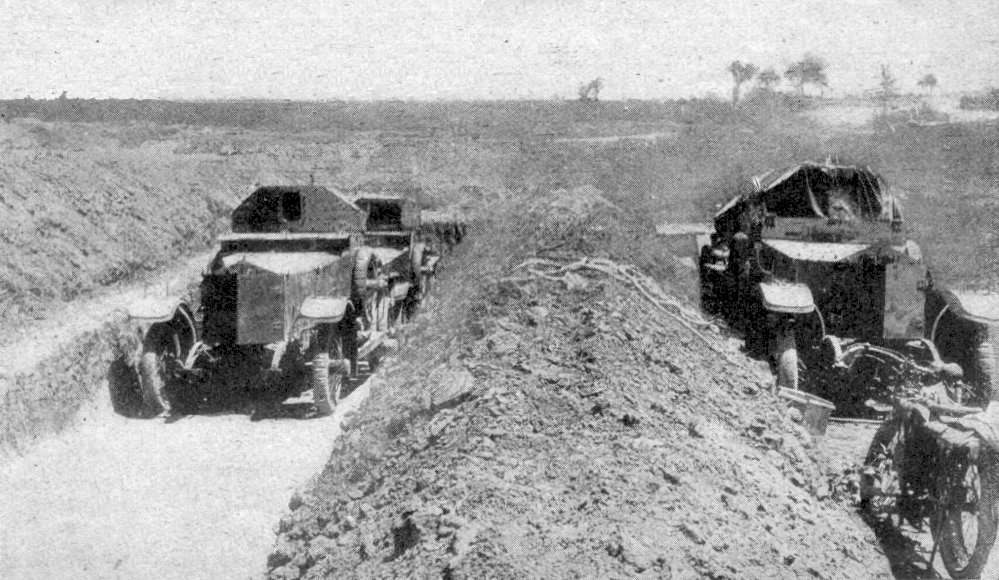
RNAS armoured cars during the Battle of Gallipoli, 1915.

The first informal use of armoured cars by the RNAS was when Commander Charles Samson, on withdrawing The Eastchurch Squadron from Antwerp to Dunkirk, used the squadron's unarmoured touring cars to provide line of communications security and to pick up aircrew who had been forced to land in hostile territory. Commander Samson's younger brother Felix saw the possibilities when he armed one car with a Maxim gun and ambushed a German car near Cassel on 4 September 1914. Commander Samson then had a shipbuilder in Dunkirk, Forges et Chantiers de France, add boilerplate to his Rolls-Royce and Mercedes vehicles.

The Admiralty set up the UK's first mechanised armoured land force, The Naval Airmans Armoured Car Force, to support the Marine Battalions fighting as infantry in France and Flanders. Established with 60 fighting vehicles in September 1914, 18 x Rolls Royce, 21 x Clement-Talbot and 21 Wolsey armoured cars supported by 40 non-fighting vehicles, 4 x Wolsey ambulances, 8 x cars to carry spare parts, 8 x general service cars and 20 lorries it had its headquarters in 48 Dover Street, London and Depot at Wormwood Scrubs.

By November 1914 the Force had become the Royal Naval Armoured Car Division (RNACD) with a planned expansion to 23 squadrons. In the end it mustered 20 active squadrons: three equipped with armoured cars, seven with mixed armoured cars and lorries, five with motorcycle-combinations, three with armoured lorries, an experimental squadron (No.20) and an emergency squadron formed in Alexandria using armoured car sections from N.. 3 and 4 Squadrons not landed in the Dardanelles.

As trench warfare developed, the armoured cars could no longer operate on the Western Front and were redeployed to other theatres including the Middle East, Romania and Russia. In the summer of 1915 the 12 squadrons were disbanded and the army took over control of 4 squadrons of armoured cars, with the units coming under the command of the Motor Branch of the Machine Gun Corps.

On formation in December No. 1 Squadron was put on defence of the East Coast. No 2, commanded by Hugh Grosvenor, 2nd Duke of Westminster, arrived in France in March 1915. The firepower of the Armoured Cars was reinforced by Seabrook lorries (three per squadron) armed with 3-pounder Hotchkiss guns.

No 3 and No. 4 Squadron, with Rolls Royce Armoured Cars were sent to Gallipoli but spent most of their time there protected in trenches until they were removed to Egypt - where the terrain was more favourable - to protect the canal and operate in the Western Desert. Squadrons of the RNACD were used in German South West Africa (Rolls Royce Armoured Cars) and in British East Africa (Lanchester Armoured Cars with British Army Leyland lorries, later reinforced with a section of Rolls Royce from SW Africa).

In 1915, an RN armed steamer the SS Tara and SS Moorina were sunk off the North African coast by the German submarine U-35. The survivors had ended up in Senousi hands and were taken inland to Bir Hakiem. In 1916 the Duke of Westminster took a force of nine armoured cars, three Ford cars with Lewis gun armament, and 28 other cars and ambulances on an operation to recover them. After travelling 100 miles across the desert, the column reached the location where the Senousi gave up the captives without a fight.

The RNAS Armoured Car Expeditionary Force consisted of 3 squadrons formed from 15 and 17 Squadrons plus volunteers from disbanded units under Oliver Locker-Lampson, sent to Russia in 1915, the Caucasus in 1916 and Galicia in 1917. It was transferred to Royal marines' control in November 1917 before leaving Russia in early 1918.

However, RNAS experience of the Western Front would not be lost, No. 20 Squadron RNAS was retained under Naval control to further develop armoured vehicles for land battle, these personnel later becoming the nucleus of the team working under the Landship Committee that developed the first tanks.

The RAF later inherited some ex-RNAS armoured cars left in the Middle East, and during the Second World War, the Number 1 Armoured Car Company RAF played an important role in the defence of RAF Habbaniya when the base was attacked by Iraqi nationalists.

== Bases and stations ==
England
- Aldeburgh, Suffolk
- Atwick, Yorkshire
- Bacton, Norfolk
- Bayfield, Norfolk
- Burnham-on-Crouch, Essex
- Calshot, Hampshire
- Chelmsford, Essex
- Chingford, Essex
- Clacton-on-Sea, Essex
- Covehithe, Suffolk
- Cranwell, Lincolnshire
- Detling, Kent
- Dover (Guston Road), Kent
- Eastbourne (St Anthony's Hill), East Sussex
- Eastchurch, Kent
- Fairlop, Essex
- Felixstowe (Landguard Common), Suffolk
- Felixstowe Dock, Suffolk
- Goldhanger, Essex
- Gosport, Hampshire
- Grain and Port Victoria, Kent
- Hainault Farm, Essex
- Hendon Aerodrome, Middlesex
- Hickling Broad, Norfolk
- Hornsea Mere, Yorkshire
- Lee-On-Solent, Hampshire
- Narborough, Norfolk
- Newlyn, Cornwall
- Pulham St Mary, Norfolk
- Scarborough, Yorkshire
- Treligga, Cornwall
- Walmer, Kent
- West Drayton (Stockley), Middlesex
- Widford, Essex
- Wormwood Scrubs, London
- Yarmouth, Isle of Wight

Scotland

- Caldale, Orkney
- Cromarty, Ross & Cromarty
- Donibristle, Fife
- East Fortune, East Lothian
- Houghton Bay, Orkney
- Loch Doon, Ayrshire
- Longside, Aberdeenshire
- Scapa Flow, Orkney
- Turnhouse, Edinburgh

Wales

- Fishguard, Pembrokeshire

France

- Dunkirk
- Saint-Pol-sur-Mer
- La Bellevue
- Vendôme

Eastern Mediterranean

- Imbros, Turkey
- Moudros, Greece
- Stravos
- Thasos, Greece

Elsewhere

- Durban, South Africa
- Otranto, Italy
- Malta
- Mombasa, Kenya

== Organisations ==
Before the outbreak of War, the navy was charged with the home defence of Britain, which must inevitably mean the prevention of an invasion by sea or air, whilst the army was responsible for offensive action overseas. As part of Britain's defences, the role of the naval air operations was seen to be to prevent enemy invasion by air (specifically by Zeppelin airships), to locate enemy shipping that might pose a threat, and to develop bomber capabilities against enemy airship sheds or harbour installations.

Until June 1914 Naval air development had been managed from Eastchurch Naval Air Station, whilst operations were the responsibility of each Naval Port Officer in Charge. The Royal Naval Air Service (RNAS) was formally created on 1 July 1914 with HQ at Eastchurch. On 26 August 1914 a section of the RNAS, under Wing Commander Samson, was ordered to move to Ostend, Belgium, to support the Belgian Army in defending the Channel ports. A few days later a second section was sent to Dunkirk to support the French Army. On 10 September 1914 the various sections of the RNAS were designated as Squadrons with a high degree of operational autonomy:

- No. 1 Squadron at Dunkirk supporting the French army;
- No. 2 Squadron at Eastchurch engaged in Home Defence and;
- No. 3 Squadron at Ostend supporting the Belgians.

On 11 March 1915 No.3 Squadron was despatched to the Aegean to support the army in the Dardanelles Campaign.

The RNAS reorganised their operations on 21 June 1915 into Wings, each with a number of subsidiary Squadrons lettered as Squadrons a, b, c etc.

- No. 1 Wing (formerly No. 1 Squadron) was at St Pol near Dunkirk on reconnaissance and offensive operations over the Channel.
- No. 2 Wing (No. 2 Squadron) was now mainly carrying out defensive operations against Zeppelins from British aerodromes.
- No. 3 Wing (No. 3 Squadron) was in the Dardenalles providing naval support and
- No. 4 Wing based at Eastchurch was responsible for training and aircraft testing.

Each Wing included both land-based aircraft and seaplanes as required.

In August 1915 No.2 Wing was sent to the Aegean to reinforce No. 3 Wing, and No. 4 Wing took on the Home Defence duties. In January 1916 No.3 Wing was withdrawn from the Middle East and disbanded, but it was reformed soon after as a specialist bomber force and sent to Belfort on the Western Front charged with disrupting German industrial production sites. Further Wings were created over the following months:

- Wings 4 and 5 were expanded from Wing 1 in France, the former being fighters and the latter having bombing duties.
- Wing 6 was formed for patrolling the Adriatic Sea, but was expanded to Malta by 1918.

The Wing denominations began to be dissolved in November 1916 when No.1 Wing was divided into three independent units designated as 1, 2 and 3 (Naval) Squadrons. Nos. 4 and 5 Wings were similarly broken up into separate Squadrons on 31 December 1916 and by the end of March 1918, when the RNAS was absorbed into the newly formed RAF, only No.2 Wing in the Western Mediterranean was still in operation. On the 1st April 1918 Squadrons of the RNAS took Squadron numbers in the RAF by adding '200' to their RNAS numbers. It was not however until September 1918 that the Squadrons serving in the Eastern Mediterranean, still lettered A to D, and Z, formally adopted their RAF Squadron numbers they had been allotted. Then Squadron A became Squadron 222; Squadron B became Squadron 223; Squadron C became Squadron 220; and Squadron D became Squadron 221 of the RAF. Squadron Z was transferred to the Royal Greek Navy.

== Ranks ==
=== Officer ranks ===
In the RNAS both pilots and observers held appointments as well as their normal Royal Navy ranks, and wore insignia appropriate to the appointment instead of the rank. The insignia consisted of standard Royal Navy cuff stripes corresponding to their normal ranks, surmounted by an eagle (for pilots) or a winged letter "O" (for observers). In addition, Squadron Commanders and Squadron Observers with less than eight years' seniority had their insignia surmounted by two eight-pointed stars, one above the other, while Flight Commanders and Flight Observers had their insignia surmounted by one such star.

Rank group	General / flag officers	Senior officers					Junior officers
Royal Naval Air Service (1914–April 1918)
Royal Naval Air Service (1914–April 1918)		Wing captain	Wing commander in the role of wing captain	Wing commander	Squadron commander (>8 years seniority)	Squadron commander (<8 years seniority)	Flight commander	Flight lieutenant	Flight sub-lieutenant	Flight midshipman
Observer officers		Observer captain	Wing observer in the role of observer captain	Wing observer	Squadron observer (>8 years seniority)	Squadron observer (<8 years seniority)	Flight observer	Observer lieutenant	Observer sub-lieutenant

After the RNAS merged with the Royal Flying Corps to form the Royal Air Force in 1918, the RNAS pilot appointments became the basis of certain RAF officer ranks, most notably Wing Commander and Flight Lieutenant.

=== Other ranks ===
The following grades were introduced for other ranks in the RNAS and were announced in the London Gazette in 1914. (Note: A comparison of these ratings with the equivalent ranks in the RFC and RAF appeared in Air Ministry Weekly Order 109 of 1921.)

Rank group	Senior NCOs		Junior NCOs	Enlisted
Royal Naval Air Service (1914–April 1918)	2 golden cuff buttons, and a golden eagle pin on the collar: Chief petty officer mechanic, 1st grade / Chief petty officer mechanic, 2nd grade / Chief petty officer mechanic, 3rd grade
Royal Naval Air Service (1914–April 1918)	2 golden cuff buttons, and a golden eagle pin on the collar: Chief petty officer mechanic, 1st grade / Chief petty officer mechanic, 2nd grade / Chief petty officer mechanic, 3rd grade	Petty officer mechanic	Leading mechanic	Air mechanic, 1st class	Air mechanic, 1st class (acting)	Air mechanic, 2nd class

== See also ==
- List of aircraft of the Royal Naval Air Service
- Number 2 Armoured Car Company RAF
- Category:Royal Naval Air Service aviators

== Notes ==
Preceded by Royal Flying Corps Naval Wing	Royal Naval Air Service; 1914–1918	Succeeded by Royal Air Force
