= List of World War I aces from South Africa =

This is a list of fighter aces in the First World War from South Africa. Pilots were considered to be "aces" after they had shot down five or more enemy aircraft; 45 South Africans are believed to have achieved this feat, with the highest scorer being Andrew Beauchamp-Proctor, who is credited with 54 air victories.

During the war South African pilots served with the Royal Flying Corps (RFC), the South African Aviation Corps (SAAC) where they were engaged in German South West Africa and 26 Sqdn RFC in East Africa.

Name	Kills	Squadrons	Awards	Notes
Amm, Edgar	10	No. 29 Squadron RAF	Distinguished Flying Cross & Bar	
Anderson, Gerald	8	No. 88 Squadron RAF	OBE, DFC	
Armstrong, D'Urban	5	No. 60 Squadron RFC, No. 44 Squadron RFC, No. 78 Squadron RFC, No. 151 Squadron RAF	Distinguished Flying Cross	
Barton, Horace	19	No. 84 Squadron RFC, No. 24 Squadron RAF	Distinguished Flying Cross with Bar	
Beauchamp-Proctor, Andrew	54	No. 84 Squadron RFC	Victoria Cross, Distinguished Service Order, Distinguished Flying Cross, Military Cross & Bar, Mentioned in Despatches	
Blake, Arthur Winston	5			
Burger, Malcolm	5			
Charles Eddy	5			
Graham, Gavin	13			
Hall, Robert	5			
Harrison, Thomas	22			
Hayne, Edwin	15		DSC, DFC	
Hemming, Alfred	8			
Howe, Percy	5			
Bell, Douglas	20		Military Cross and bar	
Jordan, William	39			
Kiddie, Andrew				
Kinkead, Samuel	33			
Lindup, Ernest				
Lloyd, George	8	20, 48	Military Cross, Air Force Cross	
Meintjes, Henry	8	60, 56	Military Cross, Air Force Cross	
Pilditch, Gerald	5		Military Cross	
Pithey, Croye				
Reed, Arthur				
Rolfes, Hans				
Smuts, Neil	5	No. 3 Squadron RAF	Distinguished Flying Cross	
Stead, Ian Oliver	5			
Thompson, Cecil	6			
Tudhope, John	10	40	Military Cross	
Tudhope, Philip	6	46	Distinguished Flying Cross	
Wilton, Frederick				
Chalmers, Robert	6			
Lawson, George	6			
MacGregor, Andrew	6			
Smith-Grant, John	6			
MacDonald, Hector Omdurman	7	84 Squadron		
Nel, William Joseph Baynes	7	84 Squadron		
Benjamin, Maurice	8	No. 48 Squadron RFC	Military Cross	
Hind, Ivan Frank	8			
Sloley, Robert Hugh	8			
Daniel, Hector	9	43 Squadron	Military Cross	
Moody, Basil Henry	9	1 Squadron		
Quintin Brand	12			
Venter, Christoffel	16			
Bell, Douglas John	20	27, 78, 3	Military Cross	
Ross, Charles Gordon	20	29		
