= Frederick C. Armstrong =

Canadian World War I flying ace

Frederick Carr Armstrong
- Born: 13 June 1895; Toronto, Ontario, Canada
- Died: 25 March 1918 (aged 22) south of Ervillers, France
- Burial place: Arras Flying Services Memorial
- Military career
- Allegiance: United Kingdom (Note: Canadian airmen were required to complete an Attestation Paper in which they declared an oath of allegiance to King George the Fifth and agreed to serve in any arm of the service for the duration of the war between Great Britain and Germany.)
- Branch: Royal Naval Air Service
- Service years: 1915–1918
- Rank: Flight Commander
- Nickname: Army
- Units: No. 3 Wing RNAS; No. 3 Squadron RNAS
- Commands: "C" Flight, No. 3 Squadron RNAS
- Conflicts: World War I • Western Front
- Awards: Distinguished Service Cross (UK); Croix de guerre (France)

Flight Commander Frederick Carr Armstrong DSC (13 June 1895 – 25 March 1918) was a Canadian First World War flying ace, officially credited with 13 aerial victories.

== Early life and service ==
Armstrong was born in Toronto, Ontario, the youngest son of Fred and Emily (née Owen) Armstrong, and was educated at Upper Canada College between 1909 and 1912. He joined the Royal Naval Air Service, being commissioned as a probationary flight sub-lieutenant, for temporary service, on 1 December 1915. After completing his basic flight training, he was granted the Royal Aero Club Aviator's Certificate No. 2675 on a Maurice Farman biplane at the Royal Naval Air Station, Chingford, on 3 April 1916. In June 1916 his probationary period came to an end.

== Aerial service ==
Armstrong was first posted to No. 3 Wing RNAS, part of a joint Franco–British force formed to fly bombing raids on German industry. The British contingent was based at Luxeuil-les-Bains and flew a variety of aircraft, but principally the Sopwith 1½ Strutter, and flew its first mission on 30 July 1916. In January 1917 nine pilots from No. 3 Wing, of whom Armstrong was one, were selected to become the nucleus of the newly formed No. 3 (Naval) Squadron.

Armstrong joined No. 3 (Naval), based at Dunkirk, in February 1917, to fly the Sopwith Pup single-seat fighter. He scored his first victory on 6 April 1917, in Sopwith Pup serial no. N6178. Using this same aircraft, on 12 April, he shared his second victory with fellow ace Edmund Pierce. In late April he was awarded the Croix de Guerre by France.

His third win was shared with Pierce and Arthur Whealy on 2 May, when they set an Albatros reconnaissance aircraft ablaze. A fourth victory, four days later, an Albatros D.III sent down out of control over Bourlon Wood, was shared with Kerby. Armstrong was promoted to flight lieutenant on 30 June, and on 7 July, a splashed German seaplane six miles north of Ostend was worth a win apiece for Armstrong, Joseph Stewart Temple Fall, James Alpheus Glen, and Leonard Henry Rochford, and Armstrong became an ace. He then switched to the Sopwith Camel. Thus mounted, he scored two single-handed wins on 16 September 1917.

Armstrong was subsequently awarded the Distinguished Service Cross, which was gazetted on 27 November 1917. His citation read:

Acting Flight Commander Fred Carr Armstrong, R.N.A.S.

"In recognition of his services with a Wing of the R.N.A.S. at Dunkirk between February and September, 1917. He has destroyed several hostile machines, and has led his flight with very great skill and gallantry."

On 31 December 1917 he was promoted to flight commander. He resumed his victories on 24 January 1918. He went on to score five times in March 1918; the last win, on 24 March, seems to have been a squadron affair, with Armstrong, Pierce, Whealy, Edwin Hayne, Frederick Britnell, and three other pilots all being credited with a victory for driving an Albatros D.V down out of control.

=== List of aerial victories ===
Combat record
No.	Date/Time	Aircraft/ Serial No.	Opponent	Result	Location	Notes
1	6 April 1917 @ 1020	Sopwith Pup (N6178)	Halberstadt D.II	Out of control	Bourlon Wood	
2	12 April 1917 @ 1030	Sopwith Pup (N6178)	Albatros D.II	Out of control	Pronville	Shared with Flight Sub-Lieutenant Edmund Pierce.
3	2 May 1917 @ 0700	Sopwith Pup (N6178)	Albatros C	Destroyed in flames	Bourlon Wood	Shared with Flight Sub-Lieutenants Edmund Pierce & Arthur Whealy.
4	6 May 1917 @ 1905	Sopwith Pup (N6178)	Albatros D.III	Out of control	Bourlon Wood	Shared with Flight Sub-Lieutenant Harold Kerby.
5	7 July 1917 @ 1110	Sopwith Pup (N6465)	Seaplane	Destroyed	North of Ostend	Shared with Flight Commander Joseph Fall, and Flight Sub-Lieutenants James Glen & Leonard Rochford.
6	16 September 1917 @ 1140–1145	Sopwith Camel (B3808)	Albatros D.V	Destroyed	Thorout	
7	16 September 1917 @ 1140–1145	Sopwith Camel (B3808)	Albatros D.V	Out of control	Thorout	
8	29 January 1918 @ 1315	Sopwith Camel (B7193)	Albatros D.V	Out of control	Roulers	
9	11 March 1918 @ 1120	Sopwith Camel (B7218)	Albatros D.V	Destroyed	Drocourt	
10	21 March 1918 @ 1150	Sopwith Camel (B7220)	Pfalz D.III	Out of control	Esquerchin	
11	22 March 1918 @ 1300	Sopwith Camel (B7218)	Albatros D.V	Destroyed	Marquion	
12	23 March 1918 @ 1700	Sopwith Camel (B7185)	Pfalz D.III	Destroyed in flames	Vaux—Beugnâtre	
13	24 March 1918 @ 1530	Sopwith Camel (B7218)	Albatros D.V	Out of control	Vaux	Shared with Flight Commander Arthur Whealy, Flight Lieutenants Louis Bawlf, Edward Hayne, Edmund Pierce & S. Smith, and Flight Sub-Lieutenants Ronald Berlyn & Frederick Britnell.

== Death in action ==
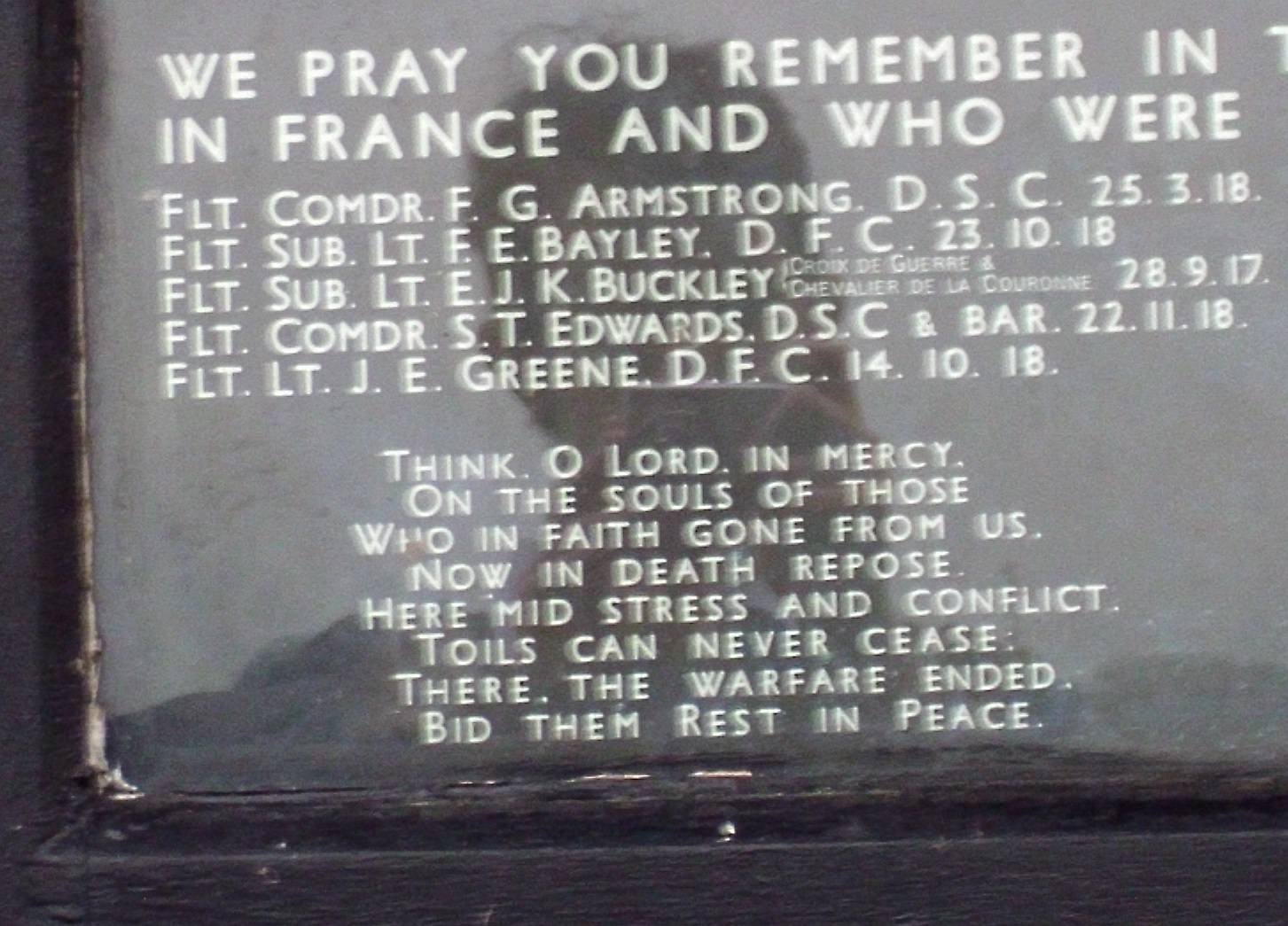
Armstrong on the Hawksdown Memorial.

Armstrong was shot down in flames south of Ervillers on 25 March 1918 while he was on Special Patrol, and was listed as "Missing believed killed". As one of the Commonwealth airmen killed the Western Front who have no known grave he is commemorated at the Arras Flying Services Memorial, and there is also a memorial plaque to him in the Church of the Redeemer, Toronto. He also appears (albeit misspelled as F G Armstrong) on the Hawksdown Aerodrome Memorial in Walmer, Kent. He is also listed on the Commemorative Stand located on the site of Walmer Aerodrome (RAF Walmer) which was unveiled by the Lord Warden of the Cinque Ports in August 2017.
