= Leonard Rochford =

Flying Ace and Royal Air Force Squadron Leader (1896-1986)

- Born: 11 October 1896; Enfield, England
- Died: 17 December 1986 (aged 90)
- Military career
- Allegiance: United Kingdom
- Branch: Royal Navy; Royal Air Force
- Service years: 1916–1919; 1921; 1939–1954
- Rank: Squadron Leader
- Nickname: "Tich"
- Conflicts: First World War; Second World War
- Awards: Distinguished Service Cross & Bar; Distinguished Flying Cross; Mentioned in Despatches

Leonard Henry Rochford, DSC & Bar, DFC (10 November 1896 – 17 December 1986) was a British flying ace of the First World War, credited with 29 aerial victories. He returned to military service in the Royal Air Force during the Second World War.

== First World War ==
Born in Enfield on 10 November 1896, Rochford attempted to join the Royal Naval Air Service (RNAS) at the outbreak of the First World War but was rejected as being underage. Instead he went to university and also learned to fly, being granted Royal Aero Club Aviators' Certificate No. 1840 after soloing an L. & P. biplane, at the London and Provincial School, Hendon, on 7 October 1915.

Rochford finally joined the Royal Navy in early 1916 as a probationary temporary flight sub-lieutenant, to serve in the Royal Naval Air Service, and was confirmed in his rank on 14 May 1916. He was posted to No. 3 Naval Squadron RNAS in January 1917. Initially flying a Sopwith Pup, he gained his first three aerial victories between March and July 1917., also gaining promotion to flight lieutenant on 30 June 1917.

Rochford's squadron was then re-equipped with the Sopwith Camel, and Rochford gained two more victories in September to attain "ace" status. He gained three more victories in January 1918, and six in March, bringing his total to fourteen. On 1 April 1918 the Royal Naval Air Service was merged with the Army's Royal Flying Corps to form the Royal Air Force (RAF), and Rochford's unit was renamed and renumbered as No. 203 Squadron RAF. He went on to gain five more victories in May, two in June, and four in July, and his final four between August and October. His 29 claims consisted of 13 enemy aircraft destroyed (including 7 shared), and 16 driven down out of control (including 5 shared).

=== List of aerial victories ===
Combat record
No.	Date/Time	Aircraft/ Serial No.	Opponent	Result	Location	Notes
No. 3 Squadron RNAS
1	4 March 1917 @1115	Sopwith Pup (N5199)	Albatros D.I	Out of control	Manancourt	
2	20 May 1917 @0930	Sopwith Pup (N6461)	Albatros D.III	Out of control	North-east of Bullecourt	
3	7 July 1917 @1110	Sopwith Pup (N6162)	Seaplane	Destroyed	6 miles north of Ostend	Shared with Flt. Sub-Lts. James Fall, James Glen, Frederick Armstrong, & R. F. P. Abbott.
4	5 September 1917 @1820	Sopwith Camel (B3807)	Albatros D.III	Out of control	Leke	
5	11 September 1917 @1110	Sopwith Camel (B3798)	Albatros D.V	Out of control	Thorout	
6	28 January 1918 @1105	Sopwith Camel (B6401)	DFW C.V	Out of control	Houthoulst Forest	Shared with Flt. Sub-Lts. James Glen & C. S. Devereux.
7	30 January 1918 @1045	Sopwith Camel (B6401)	Albatros D.V	Out of control	Gheluvelt	Shared with Flt. Sub-Lts. James Glen & Aubrey Ellwood.
8	30 January 1918 @1045	Sopwith Camel (B6401)	Albatros D.V	Out of control	Gheluvelt	Shared with Flt. Sub-Lts. James Glen & Aubrey Ellwood.
9	12 March 1918 @1100	Sopwith Camel (B7203)	Albatros C	Out of control	Brebières	
10	16 March 1918 @1120	Sopwith Camel (B7203)	Hannover C	Destroyed in flames	Gavrelle	Shared with Flt. Sub-Lts. James Glen & Aubrey Ellwood.
11	21 March 1918 @1115	Sopwith Camel (B7222)	Albatros D.V	Out of control	Douai	Shared with Flt. Sub-Lt. James Glen.
12	21 March 1918 @1645	Sopwith Camel (B7203)	Albatros C	Destroyed in flames	4 miles East of Bapaume	Shared with Flt. Sub-Lts. James Glen, O. P. Adam, K. D. MacLeod, William Chisam, Aubrey Ellwood, C. S. Devereux, L. A. Sands, Ronald Berlyn, & Edwin Hayne.
13	22 March 1918 @1230	Sopwith Camel (B7203)	Albatros D.V	Destroyed	Boursies	
14	24 March 1918 @1715	Sopwith Camel (B7203)	Albatros D.V	Out of control	Beaumetz	
No 203 Squadron RAF
15	15 May 1918 @1140	Sopwith Camel (B3353)	DFW C.V	Out of control	North of Estaires	Shared with Lt. C. F. Brown.
16	17 May 1918 @1115–1130	Sopwith Camel (B7197)	Pfalz D.III	Destroyed	North of Estaires–Beaupre	
17	17 May 1918 @1115–1130	Sopwith Camel (B7197)	Pfalz D.III	Destroyed in flames	North-east of Estaires	Shared with Lts. C. F. Brown, Y. E. S. Kirkpatrick, & E. R. Prideaux.
18	19 May 1918 @1015	Sopwith Camel (D3371)	DFW C.V	Destroyed	Merville	
19	21 May 1918 @0530	Sopwith Camel (D3413)	DFW C.V	Destroyed	Neuf-Berquin	Shared with Lt. Ronald Berlyn.
20	5 June 1918	Sopwith Camel (D3417)	LVG C	Out of control	La Bassée	
21	7 June 1918 @1200	Sopwith Camel (D3417)	Fokker Dr.I	Out of control	La Bassée	
22	20 July 1918 @1800	Sopwith Camel (D9618)	DFW C.V	Destroyed	South-east of Lestrem	Shared with Lt. William Sidebottom.
23	22 July 1918 @0925	Sopwith Camel (D9585)	Fokker D.VII	Out of control	Festubert	
24	22 July 1918 @1035	Sopwith Camel (D9585)	Fokker D.VII	Destroyed	Carvin	
25	25 July 1918 @0740	Sopwith Camel (D9618)	Fokker D.VII	Destroyed	East of La Bassée	
26	11 August 1918 @1930	Sopwith Camel (D9618)	Fokker D.VII	Out of control	East of Bray	
27	7 September 1918 @0815	Sopwith Camel (C197)	Fokker D.VII	Destroyed	North of Bourlon Wood	
28	9 October 1918 @1630	Sopwith Camel (D4386)	Rumpler C	Destroyed in flames	St. Aubert	Shared with Lt. William Sidebottom.
29	29 October 1918 @1515	Sopwith Camel (D4386)	Fokker D.VII	Out of control	East of Bruay	

== Awards and citations ==
Distinguished Service Cross

Flight Lieutenant (Acting-Flight Commander) Leonard Henry Rochford, RNAS.
For consistent determination, bravery and skill as a fighting pilot and flight commander. He has destroyed and driven down out of control many enemy machines.

Bar to the Distinguished Service Cross

Flight Lieutenant (Acting-Flight Commander) Leonard Henry Rochford, RNAS.
For consistent determination, bravery, and skill. As a flight commander he has shown considerable ability, and has always set a fine example when dealing with enemy aircraft. On 21 March 1918, when on offensive patrol, he attacked one of nine Albatross scouts. Enemy aircraft was seen to go down in the mist out of control. He has destroyed or driven down out of control many other enemy machines.

Distinguished Flying Cross

Captain Leonard Henry Rochford, DSC.
This officer has already been awarded the Distinguished Service Cross and Bar for gallantry and devotion to duty – qualities in which he revels. Since the award he has accounted for twelve enemy aircraft – six destroyed and six driven down out of control.

== Inter-war career ==
Rochford was transferred to the RAF unemployed list on 17 April 1919, and received a mention in despatches in May "for valuable services rendered during the war". He was restored to the active list for temporary duty, with the rank of flight lieutenant, between 13 April and 4 June 1921, before being transferred back to the unemployed list.

== Second World War ==
On 9 May 1939, as the threat of war with Germany loomed, Rochford was granted a commission (Class CC) in the Reserve of Air Force Officers (RAFO), with the rank of flying officer (honorary flight lieutenant). On 1 September 1939, the day that the German invasion of Poland began, Rochford relinquished his commission in the RAFO, and was appointed a flight lieutenant in the Royal Air Force Volunteer Reserve. He was promoted to squadron leader on 1 March 1942.

Rochford remained a reserve officer post-war, eventually relinquishing his commission on 10 February 1954, and was granted permission to retain his rank.

Rochford appeared as a contributor in the 1987 documentary 'The Cavalry of the Clouds', produced by British regional commercial television station 'HTV West'.

== Personal life ==
Rochford married Elizabeth Maud Moffet (1895–1964). They had a son, James Donald Henry Rochford (1921–1986), who joined the Royal Navy during the Second World War, to serve as a lieutenant in Combined Operations, then qualified as a barrister after the war.

== Publications ==
- Rochford, Leonard H. (1977). I Chose The Sky. London, UK: Kimber. ISBN 9780718300852.
