= William Sidebottom (RAF officer) =

British flying ace (1893–1920)

- Born: 11 October 1893; Manchester, England
- Died: 8 December 1920 (aged 27) near Rostamabad, Persia
- Burial place: Tehran Memorial, Iran
- Military career
- Allegiance: United Kingdom
- Branch: Royal Navy; Royal Air Force
- Service years: 1917–1920
- Rank: Lieutenant
- Units: No. 3 (Naval) Squadron RNAS; No. 203 Squadron RAF; No. 30 Squadron RAF
- Conflicts: World War I • Western Front
- Awards: Distinguished Flying Cross

Lieutenant William Sidebottom DFC (11 October 1893 – 8 December 1920) was a British World War I flying ace credited with fourteen aerial victories.

== Military service ==
Sidebottom joined the Royal Naval Air Service on 11 October 1917, and after completing his flying training was posted the No. 3 (Naval) Squadron to fly the Sopwith Camel single-seat fighter. On 1 April 1918, the RNAS was merged with the Army's Royal Flying Corps to form the Royal Air Force, and Sidebottom's unit was renamed No. 203 Squadron RAF.

He scored his first win on 16 June 1918, sharing the destruction of a DFW two-seater reconnaissance aircraft with Lieutenant Edwin Hayne and three other pilots. He then accumulated a series of victories between then and 29 October 1918, sharing in the destruction of two reconnaissance aircraft with Captain Leonard Rochford and the mid-air burning of another with Captain Arthur Whealy. Sidebottom's final toll was the destruction of fourteen enemy aircraft.

== Post-war career and death ==
Sidebottom was transferred to the RAF's unemployed list on 1 February 1919, and a week later, on 7 February, his Distinguished Flying Cross was gazetted. His citation read:

Lieutenant William Sidebottom, 203rd Squadron.

"This officer has carried out numerous offensive and low bombing patrols with courage, skill and judgment. He has also proved himself a bold and resolute fighter in aerial combats, having nine enemy machines to his credit."

However, Sidebottom returned to RAF service on being granted a short service commission with the rank of flying officer on 24 October 1919. On 8 December 1920 Sidebottom was serving in No. 30 Squadron, part of the North Persia Force. While flying an Airco DH.9A on a bombing mission on Enzeli, then part of the Persian Socialist Soviet Republic, he made a forced landing 15 miles (24 km) from Rostamabad, and was shot and killed by Bolsheviks while trying to escape. His observer escaped unhurt. Having no known grave he is commemorated on the Tehran Memorial, Gholhak Garden, Iran.

== Bibliography ==
- Shores, Christopher F.; Franks, Norman & Guest, Russell F. (1990). Above the Trenches: a Complete Record of the Fighter Aces and Units of the British Empire Air Forces 1915–1920. London, UK: Grub Street. ISBN 978-0-948817-19-9.
