= John Denis Breakey =

Royal Air Force Air Vice-Marshal (1899–1965)

- Breakey in 1945
- Born: 19 May 1899; Sheffield, Yorkshire
- Died: 8 January 1965 (aged 65)
- Military career
- Allegiance: United Kingdom
- Branch: Royal Navy (1917–18); Royal Air Force (1918–54)
- Service years: 1917–1954
- Rank: Air vice-marshal
- Commands: No. 21 Group (1951); AHQ Malaya (1945–48); No. 222 Group (1945); No. 201 Squadron (1935–37)
- Conflicts: First World War; Russian Civil War; Second World War
- Awards: Companion of the Order of the Bath; Distinguished Flying Cross & Bar

Air Vice-Marshal John Denis Breakey, CB, DFC & Bar (19 May 1899 – 8 January 1965) was a senior officer of the Royal Air Force. He began his military career in the Royal Naval Air Service (RNAS) during the First World War. As the RNAS was merged into the Royal Air Force, he scored nine aerial victories as a fighter pilot. He served throughout the interwar period and into the Second World War, rising to air vice marshal.

== Early life ==
Breakey was born in Sheffield, England.

== Military career ==
=== First World War ===
On 3 June 1917 he was appointed a probationary temporary flight officer in Royal Naval Air Service (on the same day as Frederick Britnell). On 10 October 1917 he was made a flight sub-lieutenant, and in November 1917 joined No. 3 Squadron RNAS flying the Sopwith Camel. On 1 April 1918 the Royal Naval Air Service and Royal Flying Corps were amalgamated into the Royal Air Force, and No. 3 Squadron RNAS became No. 203 Squadron RAF, and Breakey was promoted to lieutenant. On 19 August 1918 he was appointed temporary captain, while serving as a flight commander in 203 Squadron.

On 8 February 1919 he was awarded the Distinguished Flying Cross. His citation read:

Lieutenant (Acting Captain) John Denis Breakey.
This officer has flown about 500 hours on active service. He has carried out 170 special missions, and has bombed and attacked enemy troops, transport, &c., from low altitudes with great success, causing serious damage. Captain Breakey has shown marked ability and skill as a flight leader, and by his fine spirit of determination and disregard of personal danger sets a fine example to other pilots.

By the end of the war he was credited with nine aerial victories:

Victories
No.	Date/time	Aircraft	Foe	Result	Location	Notes
1	15 May 1918 @ 1145 hours	Sopwith Camel (serial number D3384)	LVG	Destroyed	Salomé	Victory shared with Edwin Hayne, Harold Beamish, & three other pilots
2	16 May 1918 @ 1120 hours	Sopwith Camel (serial number D3384)	Pfalz D.III	Driven down out of control	North of La Bassée	
3	17 May 1918 @ 1120 hours	Sopwith Camel (serial number D3384)	Albatros D.V	Destroyed	Merville	Victory shared with Beamish, Ronald Sykes, & two other pilots
4	18 May 1918 @ 1120 hours	Sopwith Camel (serial number D3384)	Rumpler	Set afire; destroyed	Merville	Victory shared with Beamish
5	25 August 1918 @ 1300 hours	Sopwith Camel (s/n D9651)	DFW	Destroyed	North of Hem	
6	20 September 1918 @ 1530 hours	Sopwith Camel (s/n D9651)	Fokker D.VII	Driven down out of control	Haynecourt	
7	26 September 1918 @ 1300 hours	Sopwith Camel (s/n D9651)	Fokker D.VII	Set afire; destroyed	Southwest of Lieu-Saint-Amand	
8	29 September 1918 @ 0730 hours	Sopwith Camel (s/n D9651)	LVG	Destroyed	Sensée Canal, Hem	
9	2 October 1918 @ 0850 hours	Sopwith Camel (s/n D9592)	Fokker D.VII	Destroyed	Morenchies	

=== Inter-war career ===
On 13 June 1919 he joined No. 47 Squadron RAF which was sent to Southern Russia to the support the White Army against the Bolsheviks in the Russian Civil War. On 1 August 1919 he was granted a permanent commission as a lieutenant in the RAF. On 12 July 1920 he was awarded a bar to his Distinguished Flying Cross for his service in South Russia.

From 1 February 1921 Breakey served as a test pilot at the Aeroplane and Armament Experimental Establishment, and on 24 July 1923 was appointed a flight commander in No. 22 Squadron. On 1 July 1924 he was promoted from flying officer to flight lieutenant, and on 15 September was posted to the Inland Area Aircraft Depot, RAF Henlow.

On 1 February 1929 he was reassigned to No. 204 Squadron, a flying boat squadron, flying the Supermarine Southampton, based at RAF Mount Batten. He was transferred to No. 205 Squadron, based at Singapore, on 7 January 1930, and from 16 May 1931 served on the staff of RAF Singapore. From 3 April 1933 he was a Supernumerary officer at the RAF Depot.

He successfully sat the Officers' Promotion Examinations in March 1934, and from 3 April 1934 served on the staff of the Marine & Armament Experimental Establishment (M&AEE). He was promoted to squadron leader on 1 February 1935 and was appointed to command of No. 201 Squadron, based at RAF Calshot, flying the Southampton II, and later the Saro London. He left No. 201 Squadron on 20 September 1937 and on 4 October was appointed the Directorate of Intelligence at the Air Ministry. On 1 July 1938 he was promoted to wing commander.

=== Second World War ===
Between July 1940 and July 1941 he served in the Directorate of Operational Requirements, and appointed a temporary group captain on 1 December 1940. In May 1941 he was appointed acting air commodore, with the war substantive rank of group captain on 26 November. On 20 April 1943 he was appointed acting air vice-marshal, and served as Assistant Chief of the Air Staff (Technical Requirements). He was appointed (temporary) air commodore on 1 June 1943, with the permanent rank of group captain from 1 December 1943.

On 1 January 1944 he was made a Companion of the Order of the Bath (CB), and was granted the rank of war substantive air commodore on 20 April.

== Postwar career ==
In September 1945 he was appointed Air Officer Commanding, No. 222 Group, Ceylon, and from 1 October 1945 was Air Officer Commanding, Air Headquarters Malaya (AHQ Malaya). He was promoted to air commodore on 1 January 1946, and to air vice-marshal on 1 July 1947. On 13 January 1948 Breakey was appointed Air Officer in Charge of Administration, Bomber Command. From March 1951 he served as Air Officer Commanding No. 21 (Training) Group, and was appointed Head of the Air Force Staff at the British Joint Services Mission at Washington, D.C., on 1 August 1951, staying in that post until February 1954. He retired from the RAF on 10 May 1954.

Air Vice-Marshal Breakey died on 8 January 1965.
