= Meintjes =

Meintjes is a surname. Notable people with the surname include:

- Doug Meintjes (1890–1979), South African cricketer
- Henry Meintjes (1892–1949), South African flying ace
- Johannes Meintjes (1923–1980), South African artist and writer
- Laurens Meintjes (1868–1941), South African track cyclist
- Louis Meintjes (born 1992), South African cyclist
