= Jack Mason (RAF airman) =

British WW1 airman & MM recipient

- Born: 1896; Liverpool, England of an Irish Family
- Died: 29/12/1970; Belfast, Northern Ireland
- Military career
- Allegiance: United Kingdom
- Branch: British Army; Royal Flying Corps
- Rank: Sergeant
- Service number: P/13911
- Unit: No. 11 Squadron RFC
- Conflicts: World War I • Western Front
- Awards: Military Medal

Sergeant Jack Mason MM (1896–1968) was a British World War I flying ace credited with five aerial victories.

In 1917, Mason was a Corporal in the Royal Flying Corps, serving as an observer/gunner in No. 11 Squadron, flying the Bristol F.2b two-seater fighter. His first aerial victory came on 8 June, with Captain Richard Raymond-Barker as his pilot, when he drove down out of control an Albatros D.III over Bohain. On 14 August, he drove down an Albatros D.V over Brebières, and on 21 October accounted for three D.Vs over Boiry–Lécluse, with pilot Lieutenant Ronald Mauduit on both occasions.

He gained his own flying licence and was credited with 5 aerial victories.

In November 1917, he was awarded the Military Medal.

During WW2, he again served at the Naval base in Londonderry, was involved in Operation Deadlight, and was awarded the Atlantic Star.
