= Breakey =

Breakey is a surname. Notable people with the surname include:

- James Breakey (1865–1952), Canadian politician
- John Denis Breakey (1899–1965), British Royal Air Force officer
- Kate Breakey (born 1957), Australian photographer
- Richard Breakey (born 1956), Scottish rugby union player
