= Lloyd Andrews Hamilton =

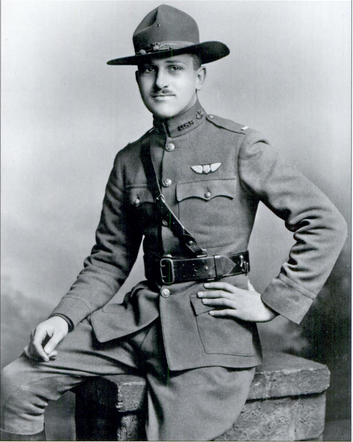
- Lloyd Andrews Hamilton, 1918
- Born: 13 June 1894; Troy, New York, United States
- Died: 24 August 1918 (aged 24); Near Lagnicourt-Marcel
- Burial place: Pittsfield Cemetery, Pittsfield, Massachusetts
- Military career
- Allegiance: United States
- Branch: Royal Air Force (United Kingdom); Air Service, United States Army
- Rank: First Lieutenant
- Units: Royal Air Force: No. 3 Squadron RAF; Air Service, United States Army: 17th Aero Squadron
- Conflicts: World War I
- Awards: Distinguished Service Cross; Distinguished Flying Cross (British)

First Lieutenant Lloyd Andrews Hamilton (13 June 1894 – 24 August 1918) was an American World War I flying ace credited with ten aerial victories. During five months of 1918 he became an ace with the Royal Air Force (RAF) and then again with the United States Air Service (USAS). Hamilton Air Force Base is named after him.

== Early life ==
Lloyd Andrews Hamilton was born in Troy, New York, the only child of Methodist minister Reverend John A. Hamilton and his wife Jennie Andrews Hamilton. He was a bright scholar who took his Baccalaureate Degree magnum cum laude from Syracuse University in 1916 and was a member of the Psi Upsilon fraternity. He initiated post-graduate studies at Harvard Business School in September 1916. When America entered World War I, he enlisted in the USAS, on 28 April and in May he reported to Plattsburgh, New York, for officer training.

== Aviation service ==
Hamilton shipped out to England in late 1917 where he trained in early 1918 in an Avro 504, perhaps at RFC Bramham Moor which was then renamed RAF Tadcaster, near Bramham cum Oglethorpe in Yorkshire. Hamilton was temporarily posted as a first lieutenant to United Kingdom No. 3 Squadron, Royal Flying Corps, on 2 March 1918 He first scored as a combat pilot on 11 April 1918, flying the Sopwith Camel against his first German opponent, an LVG C.VI observation aircraft. The next day he made his second aerial kill; his third a week later. On 20 April he was flying at the tail end of 'C' flight when his commander Richard Raymond-Barker was attacked and killed by Manfred von Richthofen, known as the Red Baron. From far away Hamilton saw Richthofen shoot down a second aviator (who crashed but lived), then Hamilton was near enough to engage a blue Fokker Dr.I triplane, expending more than 300 rounds at it after which it went into a dive and spin, but Hamilton's own maneuvers prevented him from seeing what happened to it. Hamilton returned to base and claimed a kill but it was never confirmed—all of Richthofen's flight had returned safe from the engagement. On 3 June 1918, Hamilton became an ace, scoring his fifth confirmed victory.

Hamilton was assigned to the USAS 17th Aero Squadron to help them complete their training. When they moved into combat, he was one of their Flight Commanders. In his service he downed three enemy aircraft and two observation balloons, becoming a double ace—once flying under RFC command and once again for USAS. His first USAS victory on 7 August was during an offensive patrol; the squadron was flying high at 16,000 feet (5,000 m) when they noticed eight Fokker D.VIIs well below them over Armentières. The 17th squadron dove to attack and Hamilton downed an enemy aircraft after firing 200 rounds.

On Hamilton's final mission he was paired with Lt. Jesse F. Campbell to bomb and strafe transports along the Bapaume–Cambrai road, to strafe enemy troops in retreat and to attack an observation balloon that had been spotted to the north. After dropping their bombs on a small building and transports, Campbell and Hamilton turned to bust the balloon. Hamilton sprayed the balloon with machine gun rounds, and its German observer officer was seen to jump from the basket as the balloon exploded in flame. Hamilton was then killed by defensive fire from ground forces.

== Legacy ==
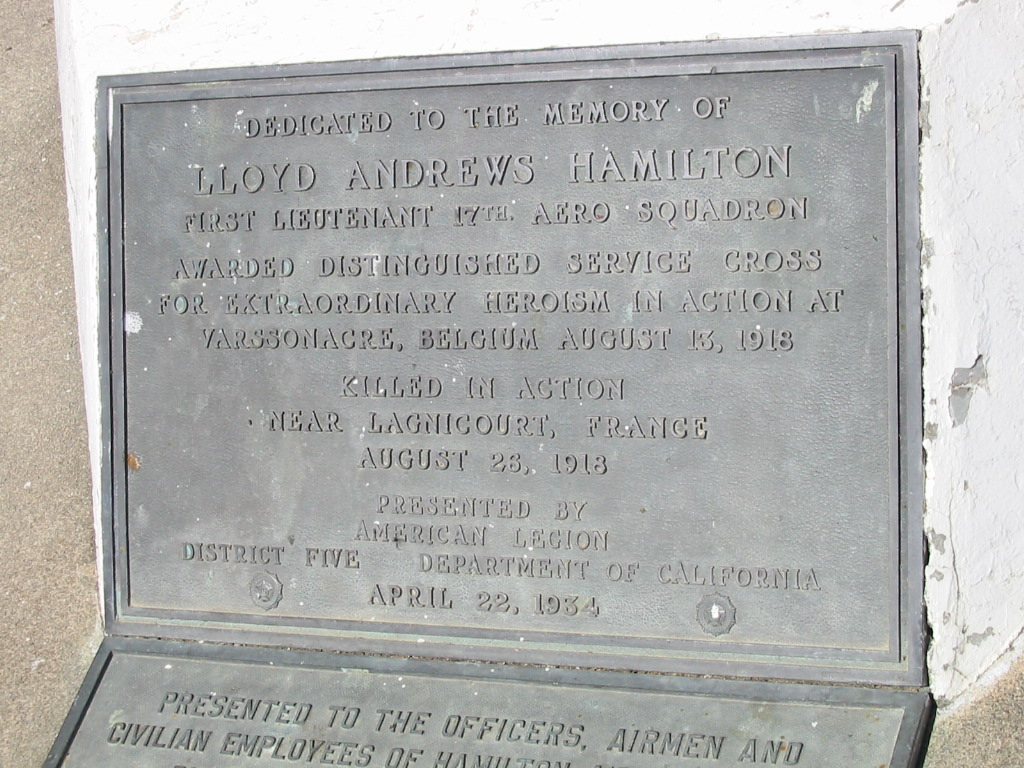
A plaque dedicated at Hamilton Air Force Base

Hamilton scored five victories each in 3 Squadron RAF and in the 17th Aero Squadron. He shared some of his victories teamed with such other aces as Douglas John Bell, William Tipton, Adrian Franklyn, Will Hubbard, and Robert Miles Todd.

Hamilton's body was laid to rest at Pittsfield Cemetery in Pittsfield, Massachusetts. His father mentioned Hamilton in Sunday sermons for many years after the war.

In July 1932, the new military airfield at Novato, California was named Hamilton Field in tribute. In April 1934, a plaque was emplaced to commemorate him.

== Honors and awards ==
Distinguished Service Cross (DSC)

The Distinguished Service Cross is presented to Lloyd A. Hamilton, First Lieutenant (Air Service), U.S. Army, for extraordinary heroism in action at Varssenaere, Belgium, August 13, 1918. Leading a low bombing attack on a German aerodrome, 30 miles behind the line, Lieutenant Hamilton destroyed the hangars on the north side of the aerodrome and then attacked a row of enemy machines, flying as low as 20 feet from the ground despite intense machine-gun fire, and setting fire to three of the German planes. He then turned and fired bursts through the windows of the chateau in which the German pilots were quartered, 26 of whom were afterwards reported killed. General Orders No. 20, W.D., 1919.

Distinguished Flying Cross (DFC)

On 13 August 1918, Lt. Hamilton led a flight on a mission against Varssenaere aerodrome. He dropped four bombs from 200 feet on aeroplane hangars, recording two hits. He then used machine guns on the German officers' billets and made four circuits of the aerodrome. On the first circuit, he shot one enemy aircraft on the ground, which caught fire. On the third circuit, he shot a Fokker biplane, which also caught fire. On 7 August 1918, he destroyed a Fokker biplane over Armentières. On 12 July, he brought down two enemy aircraft and on two other occasions drove down enemy machines.

== See also ==
- List of World War I flying aces from the United States
