= Will Hubbard =

British First World War flying ace

- Born: 25 February 1895; Todmorden, West Riding of Yorkshire, England
- Died: 1 July 1969 (aged 74); Carlton, Victoria, Australia
- Military career
- Allegiance: United Kingdom; Australia
- Branch: British Army; Royal Navy; Royal Air Force; Royal Australian Air Force
- Service years: 1914–1919; 1939–1945
- Rank: Captain
- Units: Warwickshire Yeomanry; No. 3 Squadron RNAS; Royal Naval Armoured Car Division; No. 3 Squadron RAF
- Conflicts: World War I • Western Front • Gallipoli campaign World War II
- Awards: Distinguished Flying Cross

Captain Will Hubbard DFC (25 February 1895 – 1 July 1969) was a British World War I aviation equipment developer and flying ace. He fought in the Gallipoli campaign prior to his aviation career. In 1916, he was sent to England to work on developing self-ejecting parachutes and new aircraft. In latter 1917, he earned his pilot's wings and would go on to be credited with ten aerial victories. In later life, he developed the first model of Holden automobile.

== Biography ==
=== Early life ===
Will Hubbard was born in Todmorden, in the West Riding of Yorkshire. His father William, the landlord of the Rope and Anchor Inn, died of influenza before his birth, and when he was two his mother married James Bulcock, owner of the Gauxholme Brewery. Hubbard was educated at the Manchester Grammar School and, after the death of his mother in 1910, lived with his grandfather, John Hubbard, and worked as a motor mechanic.

=== World War I service ===
On the outbreak of the war in August 1914, Hubbard enlisted into the Warwickshire Yeomanry but deserted after a week, when he discovered that they would not be sent to France. He then joined the Royal Navy, where he served in No. 3 (Eastchurch) Squadron of the Royal Naval Air Service, under Commander Charles Rumney Samson, and saw action in Belgium in the Royal Naval Armoured Car Division. His squadron was sent to the Dardanelles in 1915 to take part in the Gallipoli campaign, where he was twice wounded in action. Hubbard returned to England in 1916, where he worked in developing new aircraft and equipment, including testing self-ejecting parachutes.

Hubbard joined the Royal Flying Corps in 1917, being appointed a flying officer, with the rank of temporary second lieutenant (on probation), on 18 June, and was confirmed in his rank on 8 August.

After serving for a while on Home Defence duties, flying at night to counter German air raids, Hubbard was posted to No. 3 Squadron in France, flying the Sopwith Camel. Between 2 May and 10 October 1918, he accounted for ten enemy aircraft, three of which were shared with William Tipton, Douglas John Bell, Lloyd Hamilton, and Adrian Franklyn. He was appointed acting captain on 25 October 1918 and was awarded the Distinguished Flying Cross. He left the RAF, being transferred to the unemployed list, on 2 February 1919.

=== Post war life ===
After the war, Hubbard emigrated to Australia, where, after a failed attempt at farming, he became a works manager for General Motors (GM) in Melbourne. He returned to service in the Royal Australian Air Force during World War II, working on aircraft repair. He returned to GM in 1946 as Chief Engineer where he was in charge of the development of the first Holden, released in 1948. Hubbard retired in 1964; he was killed in a car accident in 1969.

== Honours and awards ==
Distinguished Flying Cross
Lieutenant Will Hubbard

"A bold and determined fighter in the air and against troops on the ground. On 26 August he engaged three enemy two-seaters, shooting down one out of control. Owing to his pressure pump being shot away in the combat he reached our lines with great difficulty, landing only 150 yards west of our front line. Undisturbed by the fact that the machine was under direct observation and subjected to heavy fire he removed all the instruments and pegged the machine down before leaving. In all he has accounted for five enemy aeroplanes."
