= Frederick Britnell =

British flying ace (1899–1980)

Frederick John Shaw Britnell
- Born: 16 April 1899; High Wycombe, Buckinghamshire, England
- Died: 1980 (aged 80–81)
- Military career
- Allegiance: United Kingdom
- Branch: Royal Navy; Royal Air Force
- Rank: Squadron leader
- Unit: No. 213 Squadron RAF
- Awards: Distinguished Flying Cross

Frederick John Shaw Britnell DFC (16 April 1899 – 1980) was a flying ace in the Royal Naval Air Service and Royal Air Force during World War I. He was credited with nine aerial victories. He returned to service for World War II, remaining in the Royal Air Force until 1954.

== Early life ==
Frederick John Shaw Britnell was born in High Wycombe, Buckinghamshire, England on 16 April 1899.

== World War I ==
Just past his 18th birthday on 3 June 1917, Britnell was appointed a Flight Officer in Royal Naval Air Service on the same day as John Denis Breakey. On 27 October 1917, he was promoted to temporary Flight Sub-Lieutenant.

By early 1918, he had been posted to 3 Naval Squadron; he scored his first aerial victory with them on 10 March 1918. His victory streak with them continued as the unit transitioned into 203 Squadron RAF, culminating in his destruction of an observation balloon on 2 October 1918.

His bravery was rewarded with a Distinguished Flying Cross, although the citation for it was not gazetted until after war's end, on 8 February 1919:

This officer has flown about 500 hours on active service, and on all occasions, when engaged with the enemy, has shown great dash and marked courage. He has carried out some 162 special missions, and has engaged enemy troops, transport, &c., from very low altitudes with great success.

== Post World War I ==
Britnell survived the war. On 30 August 1919, he transferred to the Royal Air Force's unemployed list; with that, he dropped from history's eye for almost two decades.

On 10 May 1938, he was commissioned in the Equipment Branch of the Royal Air Force Volunteer Reserve as an acting Pilot Officer with seniority from 15 May 1936. On 10 November 1938, he was promoted to Flying Officer. On 16 December 1941, he was promoted from flight lieutenant to squadron leader.

On 10 February 1954, he relinquished his commission while retaining the rank of Squadron Leader.

Britnell's retirement life and eventual death remain unknown.

== List of aerial victories ==
Victories
No.	Date/time	Aircraft	Foe	Result	Location	Notes
1	10 March 1918 @ 1315 hours	Sopwith Camel serial number B7251	Albatros D.V	Destroyed	Two miles southeast of Lens	
2	24 March 1918 @ 1530 hours	Sopwith Camel s/n B7258	Albatros D.V	Driven down out of control	Vaux	Victory shared with Edwin Hayne, Arthur Whealy, Frederick Carr Armstrong, & four other pilots
3	15 May 1918 @ 1050 hours	Sopwith Camel s/n B7251	DFW C.V	Driven down out of control	One mile east of Pont-du-Hem (fr, nl)	Victory shared with Whealy
4	16 May 1918 @ 1120 hours	Sopwith Camel s/n B7251	Pfalz D.III	Driven down out of control	North of La Bassée	
5	27 August 1918 @ 1210 hours	Sopwith Camel s/n D9611	DFW C.V	Destroyed	South of Combles	Victory shared with Whealy
6	16 September 1918 @ 1840 hours	Sopwith Camel s/n D9611	Fokker D.VII	Set on fire; destroyed	Haynecourt	
7	20 September 1918 @ 1530 hours	Sopwith Camel s/n D9611	Fokker D.VII	Driven down out of control	Haynecourt	
8	26 September 1918 @ 1315 hours	Sopwith Camel s/n D9611	Fokker D.VII	Set on fire; destroyed	Haynecourt	
9	2 October 1918 between 0800 and 1000 hours	Sopwith Camel s/n D9679	Observation balloon	Destroyed	Vicinity of Cambrai	
