= Ronald Mauduit =

British World War I flying ace (1895–1928)

Ronald Frank Strickland Mauduit
- Born: 30 October 1895; Ellichpur, India
- Died: 13 March 1928 (aged 32); Sialkot, India
- Military career
- Allegiance: United Kingdom
- Branch: British Army; Royal Air Force
- Service years: 1914–1928
- Rank: Captain
- Units: 7th Dragoon Guards; No. 11 Squadron RFC; 4th/7th Dragoon Guards
- Conflicts: World War I; Western Front
- Awards: Military Cross

Captain Ronald Frank Strickland Mauduit MC (30 October 1895 – 13 March 1928) was a British cavalry officer and First World War flying ace credited with nine aerial victories.

== Early life ==
Mauduit was the son of Lieutenant-Colonel Frank Rowley Metcalfe de Rittich Mauduit, of the Indian Army, and his wife Annie Maude. He was born at Ellichpur, British India, on 30 October 1895. He was educated at Wellington College from 1908 to 1912, before going up to the Royal Military College, Sandhurst in 1913.

== First World War ==
Mauduit was a cadet at Sandhurst when the European War broke out. On 15 August 1914 he was commissioned as a second lieutenant in the 7th (Princess Royal's) Dragoon Guards. On 17 May 1915 he was promoted to temporary lieutenant; he was confirmed in this rank on 9 August.

After completing his flying training he was granted Royal Aero Club Aviators Certificate No. 4271 on 24 February 1917, after flying the L & P Biplane at the London & Provincial School at Hendon Aerodrome. On 25 April he was seconded to Royal Flying Corps as a lieutenant, and posted to No. 11 Squadron to fly the Bristol F.2 two-seater fighter. His victory string began on 12 July 1917 when he, with observer Lieutenant E. R. Dibbs, drove down out of control an Albatros D.V over Pelves. He and Dibbs repeated the feat on 20 July over Novelles. On 14 August he forced down another D.V over Brebières with Corporal Jack Mason, and another over Dury on 10 September with observer Lieutenant C. C. Dennis. On 17 October he gained a double victory over the Sensée Canal–Cambrai, driving down two more D.Vs with observer Lieutenant Leslie McRobert. Finally, on 21 October, Mauduit was paired with Corporal Mason again when he accounted for three more D.Vs over Boiry–Lécluse, driving down one, destroying a second, and shooting down the third in flames.

On 12 December 1917, he was appointed a flight commander with the rank of temporary captain. On 4 February 1918 Mauduit was awarded the Military Cross, which was gazetted on 2 July. His citation read:

Lieutenant Ronald Frank Strickland Mauduit, Dragoon Guards and Royal Flying Corps.

"For conspicuous gallantry and devotion to duty. He carried out a most valuable single machine reconnaissance at a height of 500 feet, searching enemy roads and railways and obtaining important information. On another occasion, while on a photographic reconnaissance, he encountered twenty hostile scouts and drove down two of them out of control. He has destroyed ten enemy machines, and shown the greatest determination at his work."

== Post-war ==
After the war Mauduit returned to his cavalry regiment, the 7th Dragoon Guards, in which he was promoted to captain on 20 November 1919.

Sometime during July, August, or September 1919, he married Irene Helen Brooksbank at Driffield, Yorkshire, England.

When his regiment was amalgamated with the 4th Dragoon Guards to form the 4th/7th Dragoon Guards in late 1922, Mauduit was transferred into the new regiment at the rank of captain with seniority from 20 November 1919. On 14 October 1924 Mauduit was seconded to serve at the Cavalry Depot, finally returning to his regiment on 3 June 1927.

He died on 13 March 1928 as the result of an accident while playing polo at Sialkot, India.
