= Adrian Franklyn =

British World War I flying ace

Adrian Winfrid Franklyn
- Born: 1 April 1899; Twickenham, Middlesex, England
- Died: June 1986 (aged 86–87); Whitford, Devon, England
- Military career
- Allegiance: United Kingdom
- Branch: British Army; Royal Air Force
- Service years: 1917–1948
- Rank: Group Captain
- Unit: No. 3 Squadron RFC/RAF
- Conflicts: World War I World War II
- Awards: Military Cross

Group Captain Adrian Winfrid Franklyn (1 April 1899 – June 1986) was a British World War I flying ace credited with seven aerial victories. He remained in the Royal Air Force post-war, and served throughout World War II before retiring in 1948.

== Biography ==
=== Early life and background ===
Franklyn was born in the Heathfield area of Twickenham, Middlesex, the son of Burdett Caslon Franklyn, a butcher's clerk from Melbourne, Australia, and his wife Violet, who was born in Brighton, Sussex. His father died when Franklyn was 15, and his elder brother, Vere, died at the age of four.

=== World War I ===
Franklyn entered the Royal Flying Corps as a cadet, and was commissioned as a probationary temporary second lieutenant on 12 August 1917, being confirmed in his rank on 12 November.

In early 1918 he was posted to No. 3 Squadron RFC, gaining his first victory on 22 March, flying a Sopwith Camel, by destroying an Albatros D.V southeast of Havrincourt. By the time of his second victory on 11 April, over Ervillers, which he shared with Captain Douglas John Bell, Lieutenant C. E. Mayer and Lieutenant Lloyd Andrews Hamilton, the Army's Royal Flying Corps had merged with the Navy's Royal Naval Air Service to form the Royal Air Force, so it was with No. 3 Squadron RAF that Franklyn was credited with this and all his subsequent wins. His third victory came the next day, on 12 April, driving an Albatros D.V down out of control over Pozières.

On 20 April 1918, Franklyn became the last British pilot to engage the "Red Baron" Manfred von Richthofen in aerial combat. Von Richthofen's squadron of more than 18 aircraft spotted six Sopwith Camels below them and dove to attack. However six more Camels, including Franklyn, then arrived and broke up the German attack, with Franklyn forcing von Richthofen down to the cover of the German ground forces. The following day, von Richthofen was killed by ground fire, having avoided contact with Canadian ace Arthur Roy Brown, but strayed over the Allied lines. It was 9 June before Franklyn scored again, when he and Lieutenant Will Hubbard destroyed an Albatros C.

Franklyn was awarded the Military Cross, which was gazetted on 21 June 1918, his citation reading:

Temporary Second Lieutenant Adrian Winfrid Franklyn, General List and RFC.
For conspicuous gallantry and devotion to duty. On one occasion he silenced an enemy battery which had been most active, and on the following day shot down a hostile plane, which finally crashed to earth. He has on numerous occasions successfully attacked enemy aircraft on the ground, and by accurate bombing and machine-gun fire has inflicted heavy casualties on personnel and a very considerable amount of damage to materiel. His skill and gallantry have been of the highest order.

On 20 July Franklyn and Captain Hazel Wallace drove down a Hannover C over Ayette, making Franklyn an ace. His sixth and seventh victories followed on 4 and 5 September destroying a Fokker Dr.I and Fokker D.VII. On 7 September Franklyn was promoted to temporary captain.

=== Inter-war career ===
Franklyn remained in the Royal Air Force after the end of the war, being granted a permanent commission on 1 August 1919 with the rank of flying officer. On 1 July 1925 he was promoted to flight lieutenant, and while in that rank had a series of postings: firstly on 16 August 1926 to the Armament and Gunnery School at RAF Eastchurch, then on 14 February 1927 to No. 1 Flying Training School at RAF Netheravon. On 8 September 1927 he was posted to RAF Gosport, and from 21 February 1928 served aboard HMS Courageous. (Between 1924 and 1939 the Fleet Air Arm was under the control of the Royal Air Force.) Franklyn returned to dry land on 22 August 1930, when posted to the RAF Depot at Uxbridge, and on 10 March 1931 was reassigned to the Armament Practice Camp at RAF North Coates. On 1 November 1931 he briefly returned to the Armament and Gunnery School at RAF Eastchurch, but on 1 December was posted to the air station headquarters of RAF Andover.

In 1934, he married Isabella Milne at Westhampnett, Sussex.

He returned to sea on 2 January 1935, being posted to HMS Furious. On 1 August 1935 Franklyn was promoted to squadron leader, and then to wing commander on 1 July 1938.

=== World War II and after ===
On 10 December 1940, during World War II, he was promoted to temporary group captain, During the war he served as Station Commander at RAF Stormy Down, in South Wales and from, October 1942, became Station Commander at RAF Millom. His temporary Group Captain rank was made permanent on 1 December 1943. He retired on 30 August 1948

Group Captain Franklyn died in Whitford, Devon, in June 1986.
