= Richard Raymond-Barker =

British World War I flying ace

- Born: 6 May 1894; Forest Gate, Essex (now in London), England
- Died: 20 April 1918 (aged 23); Near Beaumont-Hamel, France
- Burial place: Arras Flying Services Memorial, Pas de Calais, France
- Military career
- Allegiance: United Kingdom
- Branch: British Army; Royal Air Force
- Service years: 1914–1918
- Rank: Major
- Nickname: Dick
- Units: No. 6 Squadron RFC; No. 11 Squadron RFC; No. 16 Squadron RFC; No. 48 Squadron RFC
- Commands: No. 3 Squadron RAF
- Conflicts: First World War: Western Front
- Awards: Military Cross

Richard Raymond-Barker, MC (6 May 1894 – 20 April 1918) was a British aviator and flying ace, credited with six aerial victories in the First World War. He was Manfred von Richthofen's penultimate victim.

== Family background and education ==
Richard Raymond-Barker was the third son, one of nine children, born to Edward Raymond-Barker and his wife Rose Mary (née Crawford) of Bisley, Gloucestershire. He was born in Forest Gate, Essex (now in London), lived in Bisley, Gloucestershire, and was educated at Wimbledon College.

== Early service ==
Raymond-Barker was commissioned as a second lieutenant on 30 November 1914, serving in the 12th Battalion, Northumberland Fusiliers. In mid-1915 he learned to fly at the Hall Flying School at Hendon Aerodrome, and was granted Royal Aero Club Aviators' Certificate No. 1460 on 18 July.

Raymond-Barker transferred to the Royal Flying Corps on 6 August 1915, completing his pilot training, and being appointed a flying officer on 19 October. He was posted to France on 22 November. On 1 April 1916, he was appointed a lieutenant in the RFC, and on 17 June was appointed a flight commander, with the temporary rank of captain. During this time, he served with No. 6 Squadron RFC and No. 16 Squadron RFC, transferring on 29 December 1916.

== Victories ==
On 12 May 1917, Raymond-Barker was posted to No. 48 Squadron RFC as a flight commander, flying the Bristol F.2b two-seater heavy fighter. He gained his first victories on 20 May, driving down a pair of Albatros D.IIIs out of control over Brebières. On 26 May he destroyed another D.III, and on 5 June drove down an enemy reconnaissance aircraft near Bullecourt. On 1 July 1917, he was promoted to the substantive rank of lieutenant. He scored his final two triumphs soon after, on the 8th (with Sergeant Jack Mason as his observer) and 17th, bringing his total to two Albatros D.IIIs destroyed and four enemy aircraft driven down out of control. He was subsequently awarded the Military Cross, which was gazetted on 14 September 1917.

== Command and death ==
On 17 September 1917, Raymond-Barker was appointed a squadron commander, with the temporary rank of major. He took command of No. 3 Squadron, flying Sopwith Camels. On 20 April 1918, it ran into a patrol of Fokker Triplanes of the Flying Circus, and Raymond-Barker was shot down and killed by Manfred von Richthofen.

As Richthofen reported it: "With six planes of Jasta 11, I attacked a large enemy squadron. During the fight I observed that a Triplane was attacked and shot at from below by a Camel. I put myself behind the adversary and brought him down, burning, with only a few shots. The enemy plane crashed down near the forest of Hamel where it burned further on the ground."

Three minutes later Richthofen shot down the aircraft of 2nd Lieutenant David Lewis, who survived. These were Richthofen's 79th and 80th aerial victories. The following day he was shot down and killed.

Raymond-Barker's body was never recovered, and so he is commemorated at the Arras Flying Services Memorial.

== Honours and awards ==
Military Cross
2nd Lieutenant (Temporary Captain) Richard Raymond-Barker, General List and RFC.

For conspicuous gallantry and devotion to duty when leading a fighting patrol. He attacked a large hostile formation, destroying two of them. He has also done excellent work in leading distant photographic reconnaissances, notably upon two occasions when his skilful leadership enabled photographs to be taken of all the required hostile area in spite of repeated attacks from enemy aircraft. He has helped to destroy seven hostile machines, and has at all times displayed conspicuous skill and gallantry.
