= David Hughes (RAF officer) =

British First World War flying ace

David James Hughes
- Born: 16 April 1899; Hoole, Chester, England
- Died: 21 June 1955 (aged 56); Dallas, Texas, U.S.
- Military career
- Allegiance: United Kingdom
- Branch: British Army (Royal Flying Corps); Royal Air Force
- Service years: 1917–1919
- Rank: Captain
- Unit: No. 3 Squadron RAF
- Conflicts: First World War • Western Front
- Awards: Distinguished Flying Cross

Captain David James Hughes DFC (16 April 1899 – 21 June 1955) was a Welsh First World War flying ace credited with five aerial victories.

Hughes was born in Hoole, Chester, to Welsh parents James Hughes, a draper from Bryneglwys, and Catherine Griffith from Caernarfon.

== Military service ==
Hughes was commissioned into the Royal Flying Corps as a temporary second lieutenant (on probation) on the General List on 12 August 1917, and was confirmed in his rank on 30 October.

After completing his pilot's training, Hughes became an instructor for a while. He was then assigned to No. 3 Squadron to fly a Sopwith Camel. He ran up a total of two enemy aircraft destroyed, two driven down out of control, and one captured, between 8 August and 23 October 1918.

His award of the Distinguished Flying Cross was gazetted in November 1918, his citation reading:

Lieutenant David James Hughes.

"A gallant and skilful officer. On 4th September his patrol was attacked by eight Fokker biplanes. Proceeding to the assistance of one of our machines that was in difficulties, Lieut. Hughes was himself attacked by two enemy aeroplanes and driven down, to 4,000 feet, his petrol and oil tanks being shot through. By skilful manoeuvring he regained our lines, pursued by one of the enemy, which, at 2,000 feet, he engaged, bringing it down in our lines."

Hughes left the RAF, being transferred to the unemployed list, on 28 January 1919.

He immigrated to the United States in 1929, working as a cotton broker. He died in Dallas in 1955 of emphysema.
