= George R. Riley =

British World War I flying ace

George Raby Riley
- Born: 23 February 1899; Battersea, London, England
- Died: 1983 (aged 83–84)
- Military career
- Allegiance: United Kingdom
- Branch: British Army; Royal Air Force
- Service years: 1917–1919
- Rank: Lieutenant
- Nickname: Jack
- Unit: No. 3 Squadron RFC/RAF
- Conflicts: World War I • Western Front
- Awards: Military Cross; Distinguished Flying Cross

Lieutenant George Raby Riley MC, DFC (23 February 1899 – 1983) was a British World War I flying ace credited with thirteen aerial victories. He was an ace balloon buster, as well as an ace over enemy aircraft.

== Early life ==
George Raby Riley was born on 23 February 1899 in London, England.

== Military service ==
Riley joined the Royal Flying Corps as a cadet, and was appointed a temporary second lieutenant (on probation) on 12 August 1917. He was granted Royal Aero Club Aviator's Certificate No. 5205 on 7 September 1917, and was appointed a flying officer and confirmed in his rank on 12 December.

Riley was posted to No. 3 Squadron RFC on his 19th birthday, 23 February 1918. He began his string of aerial successes on 22 March 1918, when he used his Sopwith Camel to drive a German Albatros D.V fighter down out of control. For his next victory five days later, he cooperated with fellow ace Douglas John Bell in destroying a LVG two-seater reconnaissance machine. After he destroyed his first observation balloon on 8 April and another Albatros D.V on the 12th, he was wounded on the 20th.

He would not score again until 8 August. In this second string of victories, he shared two credits with Hazel Wallace and one with William Maxted. It was with the latter that he scored his fifth balloon victory, and twelfth win overall, by the unusual measure of bombing it into flames while it was on the ground. The day following that, on 28 September 1918, he scored his last victory. In total, he had destroyed five balloons, two of which were shared with other pilots, as well as destroying two enemy aircraft. He also drove down five enemy aircraft out of control, and captured one.

On 14 October 1918 he was appointed an acting-captain while serving as a flight commander. He was transferred to the RAF's unemployed list on 11 April 1919.

== Honours and awards ==
Military Cross
Temporary 2nd Lieutenant George Raby Riley.

"For conspicuous gallantry and devotion to duty. He obtained four direct hits on a long line of enemy transport, and afterwards caused havoc among them with his machine gun. Several times he attacked troops and transport from low altitudes; also he brought down one enemy machine and drove another out of control."

Distinguished Flying Cross
Lieutenant (Acting Captain) George Raby Riley, MC.

"An officer who shows the greatest dash and gallantry in leading low-bombing and defensive patrols. On 27 September he obtained two direct hits with bombs on an enemy balloon on the ground, which set it on fire. Later he attacked another balloon in the air, shooting it down in flames."
