= St Mary at the Cross, Whitford =

Church in Devon, England

St Mary at the Cross
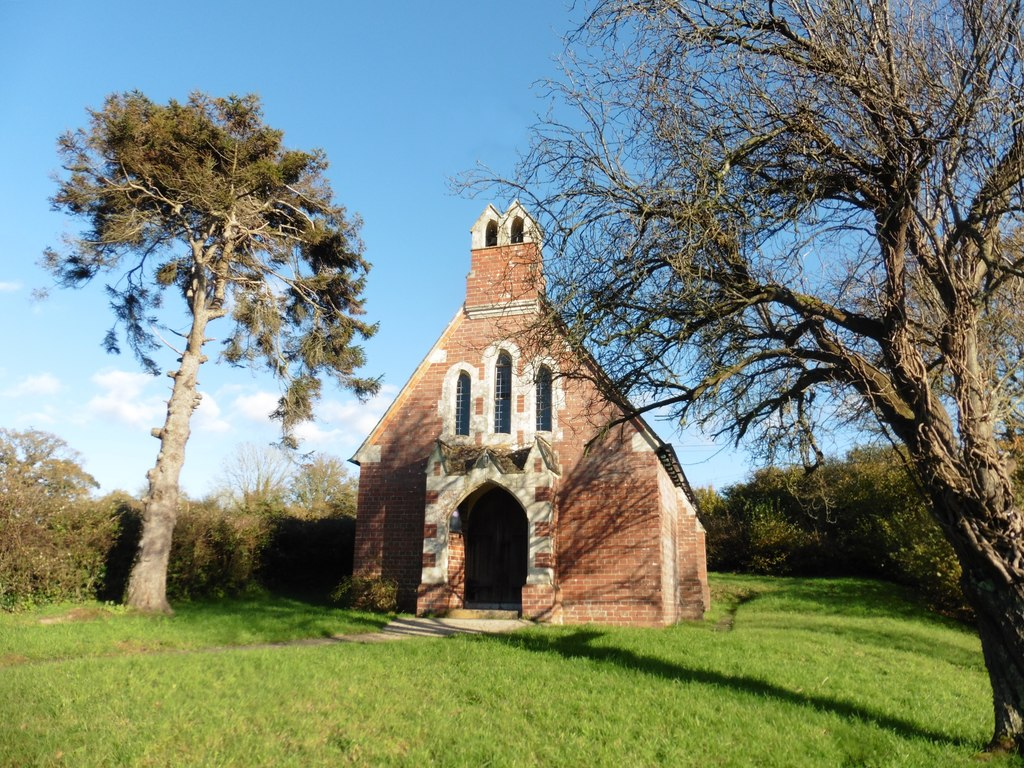

Religion
- Affiliation: Church of England
- Ecclesiastical or organizational status: Active

Location
- Location: Whitford, Devon, England
- Interactive map of St Mary at the Cross
- Coordinates: 50.7570°N 3.0496°W

Architecture
- Type: Church
- Style: Early English
- Completed: 1908

St Mary at the Cross is a Church of England church in Whitford, Devon, England. It was built in 1908 and remains active as part of the Five Alive Mission Community.

== History ==
St Mary at the Cross was built as a chapel of ease and mission church for the hamlet of Whitford in the parish of Shute. In April 1907, the Exeter Diocesan Trust received a plot of land from Samuel Pavey, on which a mission church or parish room was to be built for the hamlet's inhabitants.

Plans for a small church were drawn up that year and in December 1907, a £20 grant towards its construction cost was received by the Incorporated Church Building Society as part of their Mission Buildings Fund.

The church was constructed in 1908 and was dedicated by the Bishop of Exeter, the Right Rev. Archibald Robertson, on 8 September 1908. It was designed with accommodation for approximately 50 people.

In 1913, a stained glass window was added to one of the east end lancets in memory of Henry Haynes Lovell of Whitford. It was unveiled and dedicated by the vicar of Shute, Rev. Stanhope Mackie Nourse, on 21 December 1913. The stained glass was executed by Wilfred Drake of Exeter.

Today the church forms part of the Five Alive Mission Community. It has seating for 36 people and holds a prayer book service once a month, in addition to special quarterly services.

== Architecture ==
St Mary at the Cross is built of brick, with stone dressings. Above the west porch is a bell-cot for two bells.
