= No. 203 Squadron RAF =

Non-flying squadron of the Royal Air Force

- Squadron badge
- Active: 1914–1915; 1916–1918 (RNAS); 1918–1920; 1920–1923; 1929–1956; 1958–1977; 1996–2014; 2025–present
- Country: United Kingdom
- Branch: Royal Air Force
- Type: Non-flying squadron
- Role: Poseidon and Wedgetail line engineering
- Part of: ISTAR Force
- Station: RAF Lossiemouth
- Mottos: Occidens oriensque (Latin for 'West and east')

Insignia
- Tail codes: PP (Apr 1939 – Sep 1939); NT (Sep 1939 – Mar 1940); CJ (Feb 1945 – Apr 1951); B (Apr 1951 - 1956); 203 (1956 – Sep 1956, Nov 1956 - 1966)

No. 203 Squadron RAF is a non-flying squadron of the Royal Air Force. Since July 2025, it has provided line engineering to the Poseidon MRA1 fleet based at RAF Lossiemouth.

It was originally formed as No. 3 Squadron Royal Naval Air Service. It was renumbered No. 203 when the Royal Air Force was formed on 1 April 1918.

== History ==
=== First World War ===
The squadron can be traced to The Eastchurch Squadron, which formed Eastchurch in February 1914. After mobilisation at the start of the First World War it was renamed No. 3 Wing RNAS, and then later as No. 3 (Naval) Squadron. In March 1915, the squadron, under the command of Commander Charles Samson, moved to the island of Tenedos, and began operating 18 aircraft in support of the Gallipoli Campaign. In the first weeks of the campaign they took over 700 photographs of the peninsula, and conducted other ground support tasks including spotting for naval gunfire, and reporting the movements of Ottoman troops. On 21 June 1915, the squadron became No. 3 Wing RNAS and was moved to Imbros. On 19 November, during a raid against a railway junction near the Maritsa River in Bulgaria, Squadron Commander Richard Bell Davies won the Victoria Cross for landing to rescue a pilot who had been shot down, in the face of intense enemy fire. The squadron returned to the UK at the end of 1915, and was disbanded.

A new No. 3 Squadron was formed at Saint Pol on 5 November 1916 from elements of No. 1 Wing RNAS. It then served as a fighter squadron on the Western Front. Among the numerous types of aircraft it was equipped with were the Nieuport 17, Nieuport 21, and Sopwith Pup, followed later by the Sopwith Camel.

Among its notable Officers Commanding were Canada's first ace, Redford Mulock; Lloyd S. Breadner, future Air Marshal of the Royal Canadian Air Force; Raymond Collishaw, sixth scoring ace of the war; and Tom F. Hazell, the Royal Air Force's tenth scoring ace of the war. The squadron produced a number of other notable aces, including Leonard Henry Rochford; Arthur Whealy; James Alpheus Glen; Edwin Hayne; William Sidebottom; Frederick C. Armstrong; Joseph Stewart Temple Fall; Harold Beamish; future Air Marshal Aubrey Ellwood; John Joseph Malone; John Denis Breakey; Frederick Britnell; Francis Casey; Australia's highest scoring ace, Robert A. Little; Harold Spencer Kerby; Alfred Williams Carter; and Herbert Travers.

Eleven of the squadron's 23 aces were Canadian. The squadron claimed about 250 aerial victories during World War I.

=== Interwar perIod ===
Following the Armistice the squadron eventually returned to the UK in March 1919. On 21 January 1920, the squadron disbanded at Scopwick. The squadron then reformed shortly after at RAF Leuchars, in Scotland, on 1 March 1920. It was equipped with Nieuport Nightjar biplane fighter aircraft, however, on 1 April 1923 it was reduced to Flight status as No. 402 (Fleet Fighter) Flight RAF. In 1929 the squadron reformed as a reconnaissance squadron out of No. 482 (General Reconnaissance) Flight RAF based at RAF Mount Batten, in Plymouth. It was equipped with Supermarine Southampton flying boat. A couple of months later the squadron moved to Basra, in Iraq. In 1931 it re-equipped with Short Rangoon, a three-engined biplane flying boat.

=== Second World War ===
Shortly before the start of the war the squadron was re-equipped with Short Singapore III, long-range maritime patrol flying boat. and in 1940 with Bristol Blenheim, a twin-engined monoplane light bomber. The squadron flew patrols over the Red Sea from Basra. At the end of 1941 the squadron operated Bristol Blenheim IV, undertaking reconnaissance over the Mediterranean from various bases in Western Egypt, flying patrols from the Libyan coast out as far as Crete. In 1942 the squadron re-equipped with Martin Baltimore, an American twin-engined light attack bomber, also used as a reconnaissance aircraft and was involved in operations in Syria. In 1943 the squadron was posted to RAF Santa Cruz, in Bombay (now called Mumbai), then British India and was re-equipped with Vickers Wellington, a twin-engined long range medium bomber, to fly coastal patrols. The squadron converted to Consolidated Liberator aircraft in October 1944.

=== Post war ===
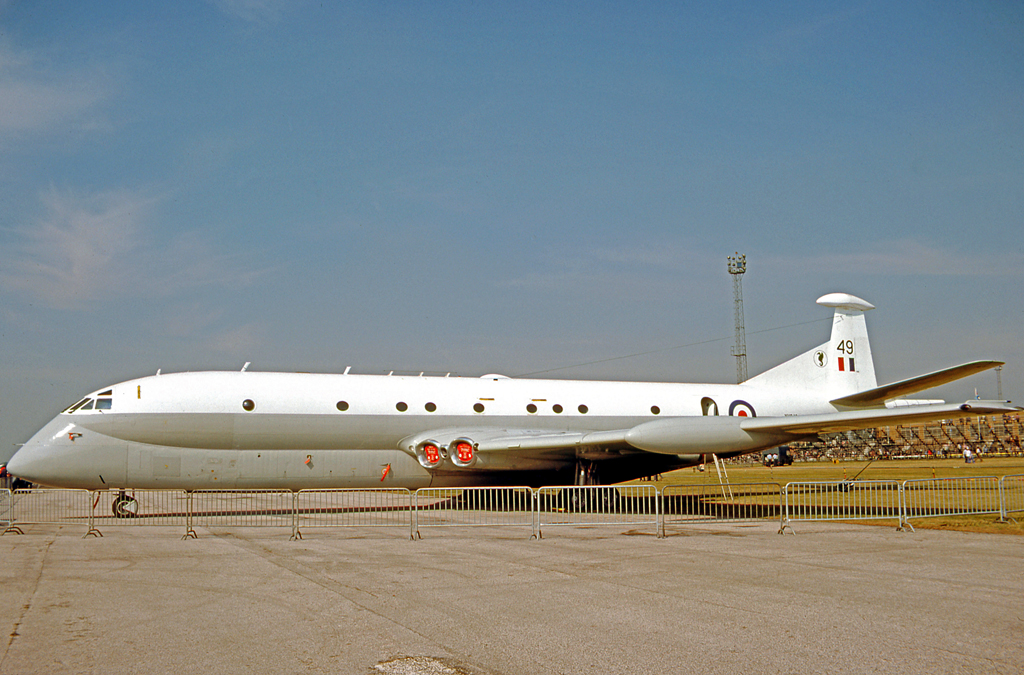
HS Nimrod MR.1 of No. 203 Squadron wearing the unit's badge on its fin in 1977 when displayed at RAF Finningley.

The squadron returned to the UK in 1947 and re-equipped with Avro Lancasters. In July 1954, the squadron was flying Neptune MR.2s from RAF Topcliffe, along with No.s No. 36 and No. 210 Squadrons as part of No. 19 Group, RAF Coastal Command. The squadron remained a Maritime Reconnaissance squadron for the remainder of its existence operating Avro Shackletons and then Hawker Siddeley Nimrods from RAF Luqa between July 1971 and December 1977. The squadron disbanded on 31 December 1977 at RAF Luqa in Malta, by which time it was part of No. 18 Group within RAF Strike Command.

=== Sea Kings ===
The squadron was reformed in October 1996, when the Westland Sea King Operational Conversion Unit (OCU) at RAF St Mawgan in Cornwall was redesignated 203(R) Squadron as a reserve unit. In 2008, 203(R) Squadron relocated to RAF Valley in Anglesey, maintaining its role as the Sea King OCU and operating the Sea King HAR.3 until it was disbanded on 14 September 2014 following the withdrawal of the Sea King from RAF service.

=== Poseidon and Wedgetail engineering ===
The squadron was reformed in July 2025 when the Poseidon Line Squadron was rebadged as No. 203 Squadron. The unit provides line engineering to the Boeing Poseidon MRA1 fleet based at RAF Lossiemouth. It will also provide the same function once the Boeing Wedgetail AEW1 is introduced into service.

== Heritage ==
The squadron's badge features a winged seahorse proper. The squadron adopted the seahorse into the badge design after noticing many large number of sea horses on the beach whilst stationed in the Persian Gulf. It was approved in February 1937.

The squadron's motto is Occidens oriensque (Latin for 'West and east').

== Battle honours ==
No. 203 Squadron has received the following battle honours.

- Western Front (1914–1918)
- Independent Force & Germany (1914–1918)
- Aegean (1915)
- Helles
- Anzac
- Suvla
- Arras
- Lys
- Somme (1918)
- Hindenburg Line
- East Africa (1940–1941)
- Mediterranean (1941–1943)
- Iraq (1941)
- Habbaniya
- Syria (1941)
- Egypt & Libya (1941–1942)
- North Africa (1943)
- Sicily (1943)
- Eastern Waters (1944-1945)
- Burma (1945)
