= Whitford, Devon =

Village in Devon, England

Coordinates: 50.75585°N 3.05207°W

Whitford
- Location within Devon
- OS grid reference: SY259956
- Shire county: Devon
- Region: South West
- Country: England
- Sovereign state: United Kingdom
- Post town: AXMINSTER
- Postcode district: EX13
- Police: Devon and Cornwall
- Fire: Devon and Somerset
- Ambulance: South Western
- UK Parliament: Honiton and Sidmouth

Whitford is a village near Axminster in East Devon.

It is situated on the western bank of the River Axe, which is crossed via a small bridge with a weir under it on a lane that joins the A358 road at Musbury. The West of England Main Line runs through a cutting close to the village, which is four miles north of the Jurassic Coast at Seaton.

The village has a church, St Mary at the Cross, a village hall, and some attractive thatched cottages and is within the East Devon AONB.
