= Neil Smuts =

Neil Ritz Smuts
- Born: 23 December 1898; Johannesburg, South Africa
- Died: Unknown
- Military career
- Allegiance: United Kingdom; Union of South Africa
- Branch: Aviation
- Rank: Captain
- Unit: No. 3 Squadron RAF
- Awards: Distinguished Flying Cross

Captain Neil Ritz Smuts (born 23 December 1898, date of death unknown) was a World War I flying ace credited with five aerial victories.

Smuts was credited with an Albatros D.V and four Fokker D.VIIs driven down out of control from 6 April 1918 until 4 October 1918.
