= Douglas John Bell =

South African World War I flying ace

- Born: 16 September 1893; Johannesburg, Transvaal
- Died: 27 May 1918 (aged 24) near Thiepval, France
- Burial place: Arras Flying Services Memorial, Pas de Calais, France
- Military career
- Allegiance: Union of South Africa; United Kingdom
- Branch: Union Defence Force; British Army; Royal Air Force
- Service years: 1914–1918
- Rank: Captain
- Units: Light Horse Regiment; No. 27 Squadron RFC; No. 78 Squadron RFC; No. 3 Squadron RFC/RAF
- Conflicts: World War I • South-West Africa Campaign • Western Front †
- Awards: Military Cross & Bar

Captain Douglas John Bell MC* (16 September 1893 – 27 May 1918) was a South African World War I fighter ace credited with 20 aerial victories. He was one of the first fighter pilots to successfully engage an enemy multi-engine bomber. He became the leading ace of the nine in No. 3 Squadron RAF.

== Early service ==
Bell was born in South Africa, the son of Herbert Bell and of Christine (née Williams) of Johannesburg, Transvaal. He first served in the Transvaal Light Horse Regiment during the South-West Africa Campaign of 1914–1915.

Bell enlisted in the Royal Flying Corps on 1 June 1916. He received his Aviator's Certificate on 22 September 1916. That same day, as a second lieutenant, he was appointed a flying officer. The following month, he was assigned to No. 27 Squadron, to fly the Martinsyde G.100. Despite the poor performance of a bomber so ungainly that it was nicknamed "The Elephant", Bell managed to score three victories flying the Martinsyde. He drove down an Albatros D.III on 1 May 1917; on 4 June, he shared the destruction of another D.III with another pilot, and drove a third down out of control. The performance made him one of the top two scorers with the Martinsyde. On 15 June, he was awarded the Military Cross for his performance of a long-distance bombing mission.

Bell was appointed a flight commander with the temporary rank of captain on 9 April 1917. He was then reassigned to No. 78 Squadron, which was flying Sopwith 1½ Strutters on Home Defence duty back in England. While with No. 78 he engaged a Gotha bomber on 25 September 1917. After nearly fifteen minutes of machine-gunning the Gotha, it crashed into the North Sea. His claim for this victory went unconfirmed; it would have been Home Defence's first victory.

== Sopwith Camel ace ==
On 13 February 1918, Bell was transferred to No. 3 Squadron in France as a flight commander. He used Sopwith Camel no. C1615 to score ten triumphs in March. Most notable was 23 March, when he became a balloon buster by destroying an enemy observation balloon, then driving down out of control two defending Albatros D.Vs, all within five minutes.

In April, he had switched to Camel C6730 as C1615 had been lost in action on 24 March. He scored six times in April, including another balloon on the 8th, which he shared with another pilot.

He was awarded a Bar in lieu of a second award of the Military Cross on 13 May 1918.

== Killed in action ==
On 27 May 1918, Bell drove down an enemy two-seater with two comrades for his twentieth win. He was killed by machine gun fire from observer Leut. Heinzelmann in a two-seater flown by Gefr. Rosenau. Bell's burial site is unknown. Ironically, he was killed near Thiepval, which would later become the site of a Memorial for the Missing who had died in the Battle of the Somme. As one of the many Allied airmen who died on the Western Front, but have no known grave, he is commemorated at the Arras Flying Services Memorial, Pas de Calais, France.

=== List of aerial victories ===
His wartime tally of 20 victories consisted of 1 (and 1 shared) balloons destroyed, 7 ( and 4 shared) aircraft destroyed, and 6 (and 1 shared) 'out of control'.

Combat record
No.	Date/Time	Aircraft/ Serial No.	Opponent	Result	Location	Notes
No. 27 Squadron RFC
1	1 May 1917	Martinsyde G.100	Albatros D.III	Out of control	Near Épinoy	
2	4 June 1917; 1415	Martinsyde G.100 (A6262)	Albatros D.III	Destroyed	West of Sint-Denijs-Westrem	Shared with Lieutenant D. V. D. Marshall
3	4 June 1917; 1415	Martinsyde G.100 (A6262)	Albatros D.III	Out of control	Hausbeke	
No. 78 Squadron RFC
u/c	25 September 1917	Sopwith 1½ Strutter	Gotha G.V	Destroyed	South of Brentwood, Essex – North Sea	Shared with observer/gunner Lieutenant G. G. Williams
No. 3 Squadron RFC
4	11 March 1918; 1730	Sopwith Camel (C1615)	Albatros D.V	Out of control	Quéant–Pronville	
5	13 March 1918; 1545	Sopwith Camel (C1615)	Albatros D.V	Destroyed in flames	Villers	
6	16 March 1918; 0915–0930	Sopwith Camel (C1615)	Albatros D.V	Destroyed	Cambrai	
7	16 March 1918; 0915–0930	Sopwith Camel (C1615)	Type C	Destroyed	Cambrai	
8	17 March 1918; 1330	Sopwith Camel (C1615)	Albatros D.V	Destroyed in flames	Cagnicourt	Shared with 2nd Lieutenant A. A. M. Arnot
9	22 March 1918; 1430	Sopwith Camel (C1615)	Albatros D.V	Destroyed in flames	Havrincourt Wood	
10	23 March 1918; 1540–1545	Sopwith Camel (C1615)	Balloon	Destroyed	Quéant	
11	23 March 1918; 1540–1545	Sopwith Camel (C1615)	Albatros D.V	Out of control	Quéant	
12	23 March 1918; 1540–1545	Sopwith Camel (C1615)	Albatros D.V	Out of control	Quéant	
13	27 March 1918 abt 0700	Sopwith Camel (C1615)	LVG C	Destroyed	Fricourt	Shared with Lieutenants George Riley and W. C. Dennett
No. 3 Squadron RAF
14	1 April 1918; 1815	Sopwith Camel (C6730)	Fokker Dr.I	Destroyed	Combles	
15	8 April 1918; 0655	Sopwith Camel (C6730)	Balloon	Destroyed	North of Mory	Shared with Captain Cyril Ridley
16	11 April 1918; 1600	Sopwith Camel (C6730)	Albatros C	Destroyed in flames	Ervillers	Shared with Lieutenants Lloyd Hamilton, Adrian Franklyn, and C. E. Mayer
17	12 April 1918; 1900–1915	Sopwith Camel (C6730)	Albatros D.V	Destroyed	Albert	
18	12 April 1918; 1900–1915	Sopwith Camel (C6730)	Albatros D.V	Out of control	Pozières	
19	20 April 1918; 1750	Sopwith Camel (C6730)	Fokker Dr.I	Destroyed	North-East of Villers-Bretonneux	
20	27 May 1918; 1240	Sopwith Camel (C6730)	Type C	Out of control		Shared with Lieutenants Lloyd Hamilton and Will Hubbard

== Honours and awards ==
Military Cross
2nd Lt. Douglas John Bell, R.F.C., Spec. Res.

"For conspicuous gallantry and devotion to duty when in command of a long distance bomb raid. Owing to his good leadership and skill a large ammunition dump was destroyed. Later, he single-handed carried out a difficult mission and succeeded in reaching his objective under extremely adverse weather conditions."

Bar to Military Cross
2nd Lt. (T./Capt.) Douglas John Bell, M.C., R.F.C., Spec. Res.

"For conspicuous gallantry and devotion to duty. He has led his formation with great skill and has destroyed three enemy aeroplanes and driven down two others, one of which was seen to be completely out of control. The high state of efficiency which his flight has attained is due to his splendid example and fearless leadership."
