= Harold Beamish =

New Zealand World War I flying ace (1896-1986)

- Born: 7 July 1896; Hastings, New Zealand
- Died: 26 October 1986 (aged 90); Havelock North, New Zealand
- Military career
- Allegiance: United Kingdom
- Branch: Royal Naval Air Service (1916–1918); Royal Air Force (1918–1919)
- Service years: 1916–1919
- Nickname: Kiwi
- Conflicts: World War I
- Awards: Distinguished Service Cross

Harold Francis Beamish, DSC (7 July 1896 – 16 October 1986) was a New Zealand flying ace of the First World War.

Born in 1896 at Hastings, Beamish joined the Royal Naval Air Service in 1916. His training was completed by early 1917 and he was posted to No. 3 Squadron RNAS. In the course of his service with the squadron, he secured 11 victories in aerial dogfights. He was on leave in New Zealand when the war ended. In his later life he was a farmer. He retired to Havelock North where he died in 1986.

== Early life ==
Beamish was born on 7 July 1896 in Hastings, New Zealand, to a farmer and his wife. Raised on the family farm, Whanawhana, he attended a boarding school in Marton before going on to Wanganui Collegiate School. In 1915 Beamish left school to train as a pilot. However, a bad heart meant that he failed the medical examination required to enter the New Zealand Flying School. He decided to travel to England to seek specialist medical advice for his heart. On arriving in London in July 1916, no issues were found with his heart so he promptly joined the Royal Naval Air Service (RNAS). An uncle had served in the Royal Navy and had provided him with a referral to a contact in the service.

== First World War ==
Beamish was commissioned in the RNAS as a flight sub-lieutenant and after a two-week induction period, Beamish received flight training at the RNAS training school at Cranwell. He soloed on 10 August 1916, and before the end of the year, had completed his training with qualification on four types of aircraft. In January 1917 he was posted to No. 3 Squadron RNAS, which was operating on the Western Front.

Most of the pilots of the squadron were Canadian and Beamish was soon nicknamed Kiwi. At the time of his arrival, No. 3 Squadron operated Sopwith Pups from Dunkirk but it soon moved to Verte Gallant. Beamish suffered frostbite on one of his early missions in February 1917 and he had to force-land on another occasion. The following month he was nearly shot down while on a bomber escort mission; three German aircraft attacked his Sopwith Pup, damaging it and slightly wounding Beamish. On 22 April 1917, while on patrol, he shot down an Albatross DIII and destroyed another enemy aircraft the next month.

In July 1917, the squadron returned to Dunkirk where it was re-equipped with Sopwith Camels, which were much more powerful than the Sopwith Pups. They also had twin machine-guns rather the single weapon of the Pup. From Dunkirk, Beamish and his squadron flew patrols protecting naval vessels. They also intercepted German Gotha bombers making their way to England on bombing raids.

Beamish was awarded the Distinguished Service Cross (DSC) in November 1917, for his service with the squadron over the period from January to September 1917, during which he had shot down or assisted in destroying several enemy aircraft. He was presented with the DSC the following February by George V at a ceremony in London. Returning to duty, he shot down three German aircraft during the period of April to May and contributed to the destruction of three more. By this time Beamish was a flight captain in the Royal Air Force (RAF); in April 1918, the RNAS had merged with the Royal Flying Corps to form the RAF and No 3 Squadron RNAs squadron was renamed No. 203 Squadron.

Having flown nearly every day since his return to duty, on 21 July 1918, Beamish's aircraft was badly damaged by ground fire during a mission. On returning to his base, he applied for six months leave to return to New Zealand. His request granted, he departed the squadron two days later. Arriving safely in New Zealand despite U-boats sinking other ships in the convoy in which he was travelling, the war ended while he was still on leave. This left him with a tally of eleven enemy aircraft destroyed.

== Later life ==
Post-war, Beamish resumed farming at Whanawhana, which remains in family hands to this day. A panel, decorated with a green fernleaf, that he had removed from the fuselage of his Sopwith Camel before his departure to New Zealand, was mounted on the wall of his home. In June 1920, Beamish married Marjorie née Gregory at St Matthew's Church in Hastings. In 1937, he and his brothers took legal action in respect of debts owed to the estate of their father. When he retired, he moved to Havelock North, in the Hawkes Bay, where he died on 26 October 1986 at the age of 90.

A replica of the Sopwith Pup flown by Beamish during his service with No. 3 Squadron is on display at the Air Force Museum of New Zealand in Wigram, Christchurch.
