= Arthur Whealy =

Canadian World War I flying ace

- Born: 2 November 1895; Toronto, Ontario, Canada
- Died: 23 December 1945 (aged 50); St. Marguerite, Quebec, Canada
- Military career
- Allegiance: George V
- Branch: Royal Naval Air Service; Royal Air Force
- Nickname: Art
- Units: No. 3 Squadron RAF; No. 9 Squadron RAF; No. 203 Squadron RAF
- Awards: Distinguished Service Cross & Bar; Distinguished Flying Cross

Arthur Treloar Whealy DSC & Bar DFC (2 November 1895 – 23 December 1945) was a Canadian First World War flying ace, officially credited with 27 victories.

== Background ==
Whealy was a medical student at the University of Toronto before World War I. He learned to fly at his own expense at the Curtiss Flying School, the first flying school in the United States, founded by Glenn Curtiss.

== Involvement with World War I ==
Whealy was commissioned on 29 February 1916. On 24 August 1916 that he was posted to 3 Wing. He served with both 3 Naval Squadron and 9 Naval Squadron within that wing.

He did not achieve his first victory until 12 April 1917. He flew his Sopwith Pup to three victories as a pilot of 3 Squadron. Then, on 9 May, he scored for the first time with 9 Squadron; he was still flying a Pup. He became an ace on 7 July.

9 Naval re-equipped with Sopwith Triplanes. Whealy first scored with his new aircraft on 29 July 1917, knocking one Albatros D.V down out of control and destroying another one in flames within the hour. He then switched to the Sopwith Camel back in 3 Naval. He scored once more in 1917, on 5 September, sending another D.V down without certifying its destruction.

After a five month lapse, Whealy achieved his ninth credited victory on 17 February 1918. He followed that up with five claims in March, including the capture of an Albatross D.V. He added three further victories in April, six in May, and a single tally in June, on the 7th, running his total to 24. After a six-week lull, he scored his final three victories within two weeks, on 22 and 27 August, and on 4 September.

On 24 September, he was posted to Home Establishment.

His final record comprised 9 enemy airplanes destroyed by himself, three destroyed in conjunction with other pilots, ten down out of control by himself, two shared out of control victories, and one enemy plane captured.

== Text of citations ==
=== Distinguished Service Cross ===
"Flt. Lieut. Arthur Treloar Whealy, R.N.A.S. For the most consistent determination, bravery and skill with which he has carried out numerous low flying harassing attacks on the enemy's troops, transports, etc., inflicting heavy casualties and damage. By his splendid example and gallantry a great many hostile .operations were hampered and frustrated. He has further brought down many enemy machines."

=== Distinguished Service Cross - Bar ===
"Lieut. (Hon. Capt.) Arthur Treloar Whealy, D.S.C., R.A.F. For conspicuous gallantry and devotion to duty. He has proved himself to be a brilliant fighting pilot. Under his able and determined leadership his flight has engaged and accounted for many enemy machines, he himself being personally responsible for many of these."

=== Distinguished Flying Cross ===
"Lieut. (A./Capt.) Arthur Treloar Whealey, D.S.C. (FRANCE) This officer has shown a very high standard of efficiency. Untiring, and full of initiative, he sets a fine example to the younger pilots. During the recent advance he has carried out daring reconnaissances at very low altitudes, invariably bringing back valuable information. He is a bold fighter in the air, having accounted for five enemy machines."

=== Websites ===
- A full record of the actions of Arthur T. Whealy in the Great War
