= Joseph Fall =

Canadian aviator, military officer and First World War flying ace

- Born: 17 November 1895; Hillbank, British Columbia
- Died: 1 December 1988 (aged 93); Duncan, British Columbia
- Military career
- Allegiance: United Kingdom
- Branch: Royal Naval Air Service; Royal Air Force
- Service years: 1915–1945
- Rank: Group captain
- Units: No. 3 Squadron RNAS; No. 9 Squadron RNAS
- Conflicts: World War I World War II
- Awards: Distinguished Service Cross & Two Bars; Air Force Cross

Joseph Stewart Temple Fall, DSC & Two Bars, AFC (17 November 1895 – 1 December 1988) was a Canadian aviator, military officer, and First World War flying ace credited with 36 aerial victories.

== Early life ==
Fall was born into a farming family on Vancouver Island, British Columbia. He tried to enlist in the army but was rejected because he had suffered a head injury when he was a child. However, he was accepted as a candidate for the Royal Naval Air Service on 23 August 1915.

== Military service ==
The Canadian government would not support a flying school, so Fall went to England for training. He left Canada on 12 November 1915, and was in England in January 1916.

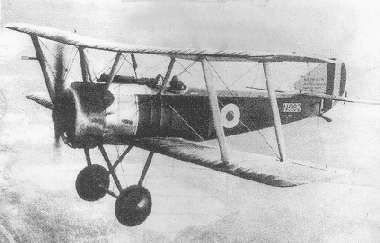
Sopwith Pup in flight. Fall scored eleven victories flying Pups, before changing to a Camel for the rest of his wins.

Fall flew a Sopwith Pup for some time in No. 3 Squadron RNAS before he achieved his first success on 6 April 1917. A Halberstadt D.II dived on him with a frontal attack; Fall half-looped onto the German plane's tail and fired 50 rounds to bring him down. Fall would score 10 more victories before changing planes to the Sopwith Camel. The 11 victories with the Sopwith Pup made Jo Fall the highest scoring Pup ace. He would score 2 more shoot-downs with No. 3 Squadron, using the Camel.

On 30 August 1917, he was transferred to No. 9 Squadron RNAS as a flight commander, still flying Camels. He claimed another 23 victories with No. 9 Squadron, with the final one occurring on 22 December 1917. On 24 April 1918, Fall joined the School of Aerial Gunnery and Fighting at RAF Freiston, serving there as an Acting Squadron Commander Instructor until the end of the war.

Falls' claims tally consisted of 11 (and 12 shared) aircraft destroyed, 10 (and 3 shared) 'out of control'.

Fall stayed in the Royal Air Force from its inception on 1 April 1918. He was promoted to squadron leader on 17 July 1929 and placed on half-pay from 1 June 1930 to 8 January 1931. He was promoted to wing commander on 1 January 1936 and to temporary group captain on 1 July 1940. He retired as a group captain in 1945 and died in 1988.

== Honours and awards ==
- 23 May 1917 – Distinguished Service Cross – Flt. Sub-Lieut. Joseph Stewart Fall, R.N.A.S.
  For conspicuous bravery and skill in attacking hostile aircraft. On the morning of 11 April 1917, while escorting our bombing machines, he brought down three hostile aircraft. The first he attacked and brought down completely out of control. He was then attacked by three hostile scouts who forced him down to within about two hundred feet of the ground. By skilful piloting he manoeuvred his machine close behind one of them, which was driven down and wrecked. Shortly afterwards this Officer was again attacked by a hostile scout, which he eventually brought down a short time before recrossing the lines. He then landed at one of the aerodromes, his machine having been riddled with bullets from the hostile machines, and also by rifle fire from the ground.
- 19 December 1917 – Bar to the Distinguished Service Cross – Flt. Lieut, (act. Flt. Cdr.) Joseph Stewart Temple Fall, D.S.C., R.N.A.S.
  In recognition of the conspicuous courage displayed by him in attacking enemy aircraft in superior numbers on many occasions. On 15 October 1917, he attacked an enemy machine from in front at very close range, at times within twenty-five yards. He then turned sharply and attacked from behind, sending the enemy machine down spinning on its back and emitting great volumes of black smoke.
- 19 December 1917 – Second Bar to the Distinguished Service Cross – Flt. Lieut, (act. Flt. Cdr.) Joseph Stewart Temple Fall, D.S.C., R.N.A.S.
  In recognition of his services on 1 and 13 November 1917, when he had successful engagements with three enemy machines. He has always shown great courage and gallantry in the face of the enemy, and maintained a high record of achievement, having destroyed many enemy machines.
- 1 January 1919 – Air Force Cross – Capt. John Stewart Temple Fall, D.S.C. in recognition of distinguished service.
