= Henry Meintjes =

- Born: 25 December 1892; Colesberg, Cape Colony
- Died: 2 June 1949 (aged 56)
- Military career
- Allegiance: United Kingdom; South Africa
- Branch: Royal Flying Corps; South African Air Force
- Rank: Major
- Nickname: "Duke"
- Units: No. 60 Squadron RFC, No. 56 Squadron RFC
- Awards: Military Cross, Air Force Cross

Captain Henry Meintjes, MC AFC (25 December 1892 – 2 June 1949) was a South African World War I flying ace credited with eight aerial victories.

He attended St. Andrew's College in Grahamstown, and at the outbreak of World War I he joined the 14th Dismounted Rifles before going to England in 1915 and joining the Royal Flying Corps. After flight training he was posted to No. 60 Squadron RFC as one of the initial batch of flying officers.

He deployed to France, flying the Morane-Saulnier Bullet and the Nieuport Scout, in which he scored four kills. By December 1916, he was made Flight Commander, with the rank of Temporary Captain. Meintjes was described as "...one of the best pilots, and almost the most popular officer, 60 ever had".

On 22 February 1917, he was posted to the No. 1 School of Aerial Gunnery and the following month to No. 56 Squadron RFC. He scored another four kills with 56 Squadron. He participated in Albert Ball's final dogfight, during which he was wounded in the wrist. He received the Military Cross in June 1917.

Thomas Marson remembers Meintjes as follows:

A fine pilot, you cannot keep him out of the air, he came to us from No. 60 Squadron, and was a tower of strength. Nothing escaped him, and nothing worried him. Although hit in the wrist a long way over the lines, and despite the loss of much blood – the cockpit was like a shambles – he brought the machine back and made a perfect landing on our side of the lines [near Sains-en-Gohelle], and then fainted away. Trust Meintjes not to faint till his job was done.

After a long stay in hospital, he was posted to Central Flying School on 25 July 1918 as an instructor, receiving the Air Force Cross for his work there. On 2 May 1919 he was appointed Officer in Charge at No. 1 Southern Aeroplane Repair Depot, at the Royal Aircraft Establishment, Farnborough, and was transferred to the RAF unemployed list on 14 June 1919. He returned to South Africa and became Chief Pilot for Handley Page South African Transports, Ltd until 1921. He joined the South African Air Force in 1922. In 1931 he joined the South African Police.
