= James Alpheus Glen =

- Born: 23 June 1890; Turtle Mountain, Manitoba
- Died: 7 March 1962 (aged 71); Eton, Berkshire
- Military career
- Allegiance: George V
- Branch: Royal Naval Air Service; Royal Air Force
- Rank: Captain
- Nickname: Jimmy
- Units: No. 10 Squadron RNAS, No. 3 Squadron RNAS/No. 203 Squadron RAF
- Awards: Croix de Guerre, Distinguished Service Cross

James Alpheus Glen DSC & Bar (23 June 1890 – 7 March 1962) was a Canadian First World War flying ace, officially credited with 15 victories.

Four of these victories occurred in a Sopwith Pup he named "Mildred H." after his girlfriend at the time (he later married an American silent actress Josephine Earle). The Golden Age Air Museum in Bethel, Pennsylvania, has a flying reproduction of his Pup.

== Text of citations ==
=== Distinguished Service Cross ===
"Flt. Lieut. James Alpheus Glen, R N.A.S. For exceptional gallantry and skill as a fighting pilot and flight leader. On the 7th July, 1917, he attacked two seaplanes off Ostend. In conjunction with other pilots he shot down one which crashed into the sea. The second he attacked himself, and after a short combat it also crashed into the sea, sinking immediately. He has destroyed and driven down out of control many enemy machines."

=== Distinguished Service Cross – Bar ===
"Flt. Lieut. James Alpheus Glen, D.S.C., R.N.A.S. For exceptional gallantry and skill as a Flight Leader when engaging enemy aircraft. He has destroyed or driven down out of control many enemy machines."
