= No. 3 Squadron RAF =

Flying squadron of the Royal Air Force

No. 3(F) Squadron RAF
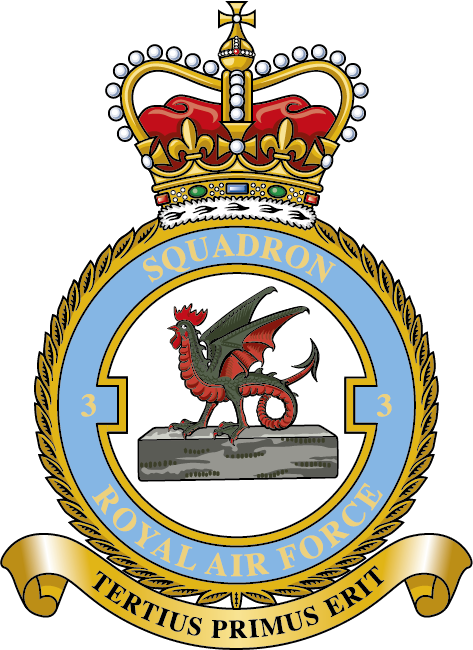
- Squadron badge
- Active: 1912–1918 (RFC); 1918–1919; 1920–1921; 1921–1923; 1924–1957; 1959–1960; 1961–2006; 2006–present
- Country: United Kingdom
- Branch: Royal Air Force
- Type: Flying squadron
- Role: Multi–role combat
- Part of: Combat Air Force
- Base: RAF Coningsby
- Mottos: Tertius primus erit (Latin for 'The third shall be the first')
- Aircraft: Eurofighter Typhoon FGR4

Insignia
- Tail badge

- Roundel

Number 3 Squadron, also known as No. 3 (Fighter) Squadron, of the Royal Air Force operates the Eurofighter Typhoon FGR4 from RAF Coningsby, Lincolnshire, since reforming on 1 April 2006. It was first formed on 13 May 1912 as one of the first squadrons of the Royal Flying Corps – being the first to fly heavier than air aircraft.

== History ==
=== Foundation and First World War (1912–1919) ===
No. 3 Squadron, Royal Flying Corps (RFC) was formed at Larkhill on 13 May 1912 by the renaming of No. 2 (Aeroplane) Company of the Air Battalion Royal Engineers, under the command of Major Robert Brooke-Popham. Being already equipped with aeroplanes and manned by pilots and air mechanics, No. 2 (Aeroplane) Company was thus the first British, Empire or Commonwealth independent military unit to operate heavier-than-air flying machines, hence the squadron motto Tertius primus erit (Latin for 'The third shall be the first'). On 5 July 1912, two members of the squadron, Captain Eustace Loraine and Staff Sergeant Wilson were killed in an aircraft crash, making them the first RFC fatalities. In 1913, the squadron deployed to Halton in Buckinghamshire to support the land manoeuvres of the Household Division. A temporary airfield was set up on what later became RAF Halton's Maitland Parade Square. During the exercise, the squadron flew a number of reconnaissance sorties and staged the first confrontation between an airship and an aeroplane.

As well as training and reconnaissance duties, No. 3 Squadron spent much of its time carrying out experimental work and working out tactics, including how to direct artillery fire from the air. In late 1913, the squadron carried out trials in the use of machine guns from aircraft, which eventually resulted in the selection of the Lewis gun for use by the RFC and from early in 1914 carried out trials in airborne photography, helping to develop the cameras that would be used by the RFC in the First World War. Other trials included the first night flights carried by the RFC.

The squadron was sent to France on the outbreak of the First World War, arriving at Amiens on 13 August 1914, carrying out its first reconnaissance mission, piloted by Captain Philip Joubert de la Ferté on 19 August. The squadron initially operated primarily in the reconnaissance role using a variety of aircraft types. In December 1914, the squadron started to receive Morane-Saulnier L parasol-wing aircraft, and was almost solely equipped with the Morane Parasol by April 1915. It started to replace its Morane-Saulnier L with the improved Morane-Saulnier LA, which had ailerons instead of the wing warping of the earlier aircraft, in September 1915, and all its Parasols were Type LAs by December 1915. In 1916 it supplemented its Parasols with a flight of four Morane-Saulnier BB biplanes, and from the middle of 1916 replaced its Morane-Saulnier LAs with Morane-Saulnier P parasols.

The English ace James McCudden served as a mechanic and occasional observer with 3 Squadron in the early part of the war, leaving the squadron in January 1916 for flying training. Cecil Lewis, author of Sagittarius Rising joined the squadron in May 1915 and flew Morane Parasols with the squadron during the Somme offensive. Later in October 1917, with the introduction of Sopwith Camels, a fighter/scout role was taken on, with 59 enemy aircraft being claimed by the end of the war. The squadron disbanded on 27 October 1919.

There were nine flying aces among its ranks, including Douglas John Bell, George R. Riley, Will Hubbard, Adrian Franklyn, Hazel LeRoy Wallace, Lloyd Hamilton, David Hughes, Neil Smuts and William H Maxted.

=== Interwar period (1920–1938) ===
No. 3 Squadron reformed in India on 1 April 1920 as a fighter squadron equipped with Sopwith Snipes, being disbanded again 30 September 1921. It was immediately reformed the next day at RAF Leuchars, Scotland, as a naval observation squadron equipped with the Airco DH.9A, receiving the Westland Walrus and Avro Bison. The squadron moved to RAF Gosport on 8 November 1922, before being disbanded to form three independent flights on 1 April 1923.

It reformed as a fighter squadron with Snipes a year later on 1 April 1924, operating a succession of different types, based in the UK, including the Gloster Gladiator. The only highlight of these years was the 1935 deployment to the Sudan during the Italian invasion of Abyssinia.

=== Second World War (1939–1945) ===
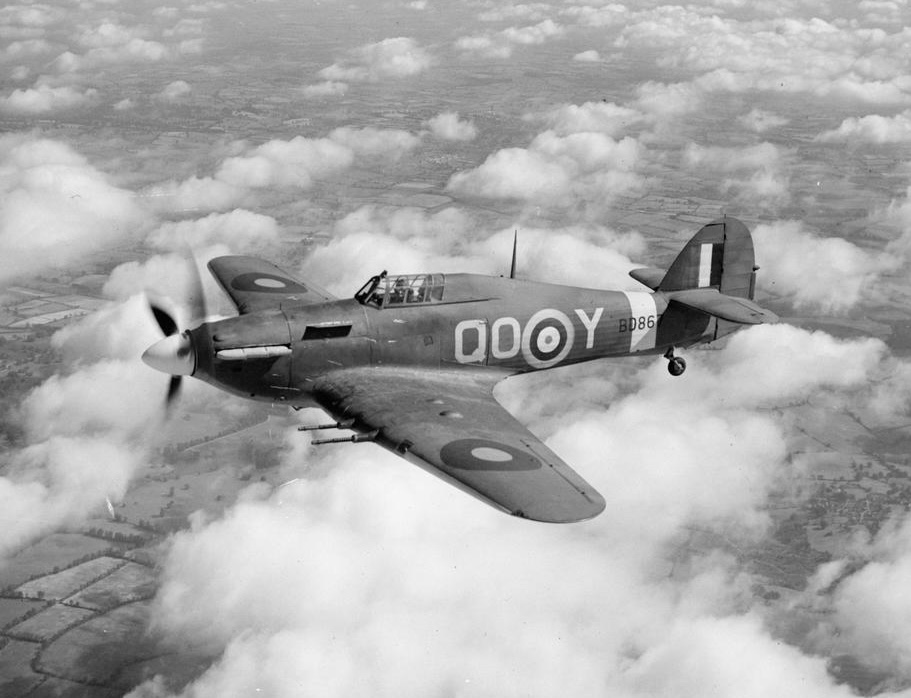
Hawker Hurricane Mk.IIc of No. 3 Squadron in 1942

At the start of the Second World War No. 3 Squadron was posted as part of Fighter Command to RAF Biggin Hill equipped with the Hawker Hurricane. It briefly deployed to France in support of the British Expeditionary Force following the German attack on the West in 1940, being forced to withdraw after ten days, having claimed 60 German aircraft for the loss of 21 of its own. On 21 July 1940, "B" flight was detached to form the nucleus of the newly formed No. 232 Squadron. Once back up to strength, No. 3 Squadron was used as air defence for the Royal Naval base at Scapa Flow, remaining in Scotland until April 1941, based at the RAF Wick in the north of Scotland. In June 1941, the squadron moved from RAF Martlesham Heath to RAF Stapleford Tawney operating the four-cannon Hurricane II in 'Rhubarb' attacks on defended ground targets and shipping in northern France and Belgium.

The squadron then co-operated with "Turbinlite" searchlight equipped Douglas Havocs in the night fighter role.

In February 1943, it re-equipped with the Hawker Typhoon for fighter-bomber and anti-shipping strikes. It re-equipped in March 1944 with the new Hawker Tempest fighter, operating over the Normandy beach-head and against German V1 flying bombs, claiming 288 V-1s shot down.

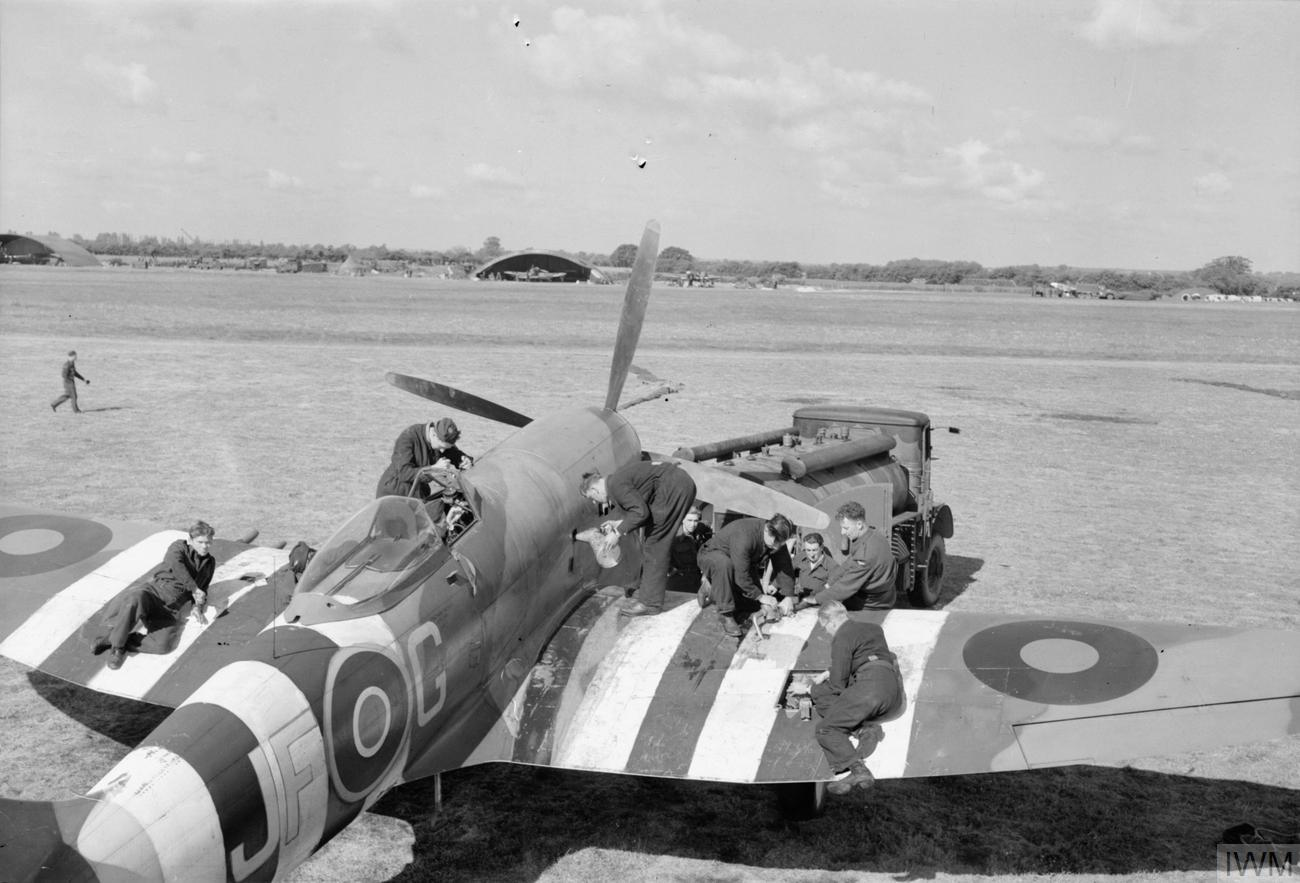
A Hawker Tempest of No. 3 Squadron being fuelled and armed at RAF Newchurch in 1944

It then deployed across the Channel, flying as part of the Second Tactical Air Force fighting through the low countries and into Germany. Amongst its pilots was Flight Lieutenant Pierre Clostermann, who flew with the squadron from March 1945 until the end of the war in Europe.

=== Post-war and Cold War (1946–1968) ===
No. 3 Squadron converted to jet aircraft with the de Havilland Vampire F.1 during 1948, in Germany, where it had remained after moving there in the latter stages of the war. The Canadair Sabre F.4 and Hawker Hunter F.4 replaced the Vampire during the 1950s. This was followed by the Gloster Javelin FAW.4 and then a conversion to the English Electric Canberra B(I).8 bomber. Most of its time operating Canberras was spent at RAF Geilenkirchen, moving to RAF Laarbruch in January 1968.

=== Harrier (1972–2005) ===
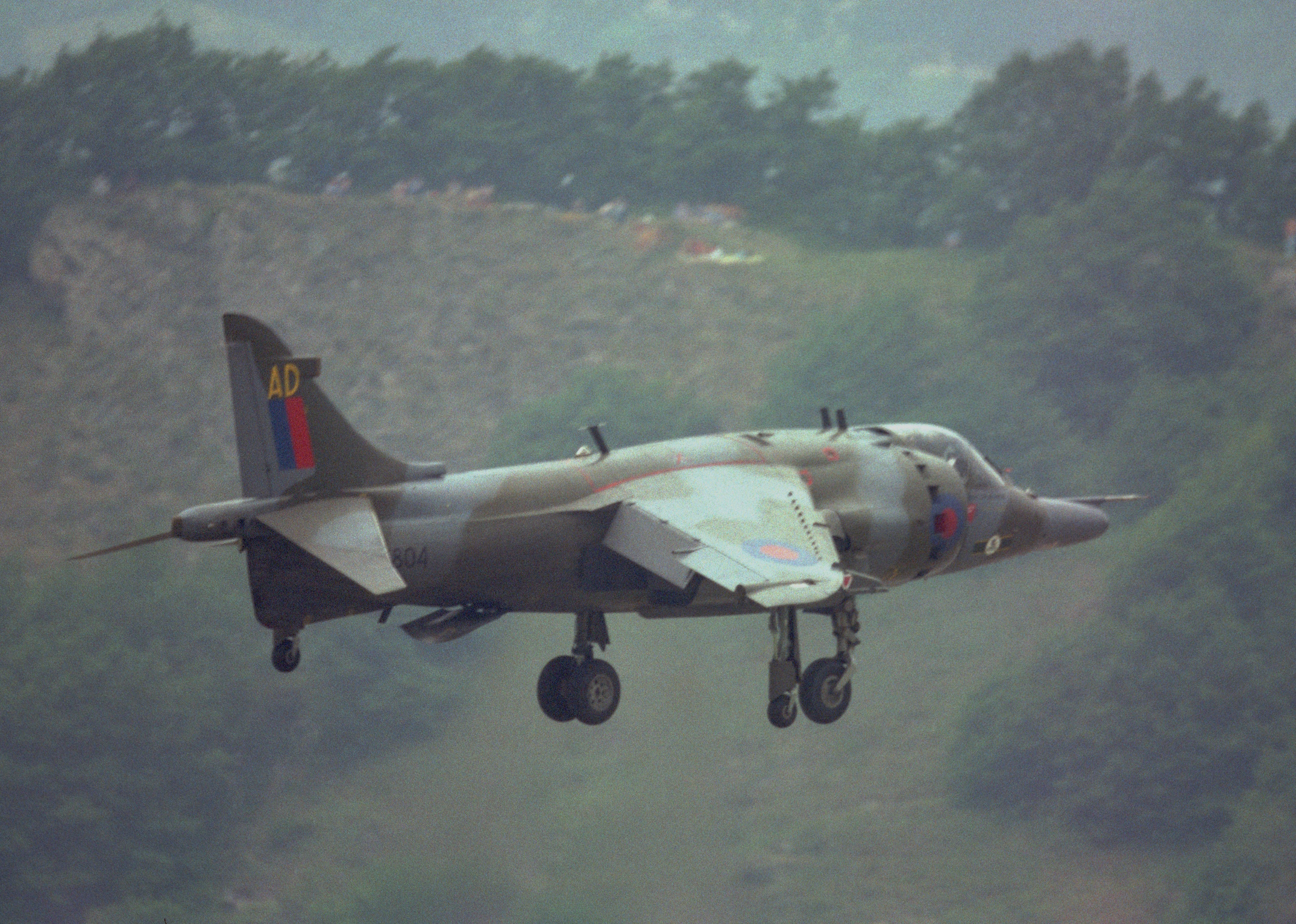
A No. 3 Squadron Hawker Siddeley Harrier GR.3 during 1986

No. 3 Squadron's association with the Hawker Siddeley Harrier began in the early 1970s with the Harrier GR.1 at RAF Wildenrath where it reformed from Canberras to Harriers and they joined No. 4 Squadron and No. 20 Squadron equipped with the Harrier GR.1 and were already operational at Wildenrath. The squadron received the later GR.3 and GR.5 model Harriers successively at RAF Gütersloh, finally receiving the GR.7 and relocating to RAF Laarbruch in 1992. In 1999, with the drawdown of the RAF in Germany, the squadron moved back to the UK along with its sister squadron No. 4 Squadron. The two squadrons operated at RAF Cottesmore, being joined by the other Harrier operator, No. 1 Squadron, in summer 2000.

As part of Joint Force Harrier, No. 3 Squadron operated alongside the British Aerospace Sea Harrier FA2 operated by the Fleet Air Arm and was capable of deployment from the Royal Navy aircraft carriers. Operations included Operation Allied Force in Kosovo in 1999, Operation Palliser in Sierra Leone in 2000 and Operation Telic in Iraq in 2003. In August 2004, it was announced that six Harriers would be deployed to Afghanistan in support of NATO forces.

=== Eurofighter Typhoon (2006–present) ===
After the Harrier GR7 had been passed to the Fleet Air Arm to be used by the recommissioned No. 800 Naval Air Squadron, No. 3 Squadron moved to RAF Coningsby on 1 April 2006 where it re-equipped with the Eurofighter Typhoon and became the first operational front line RAF Typhoon squadron in July 2007. The squadron began to take over Quick Reaction Alert responsibilities from the Panavia Tornado F3 on 29 June 2007.

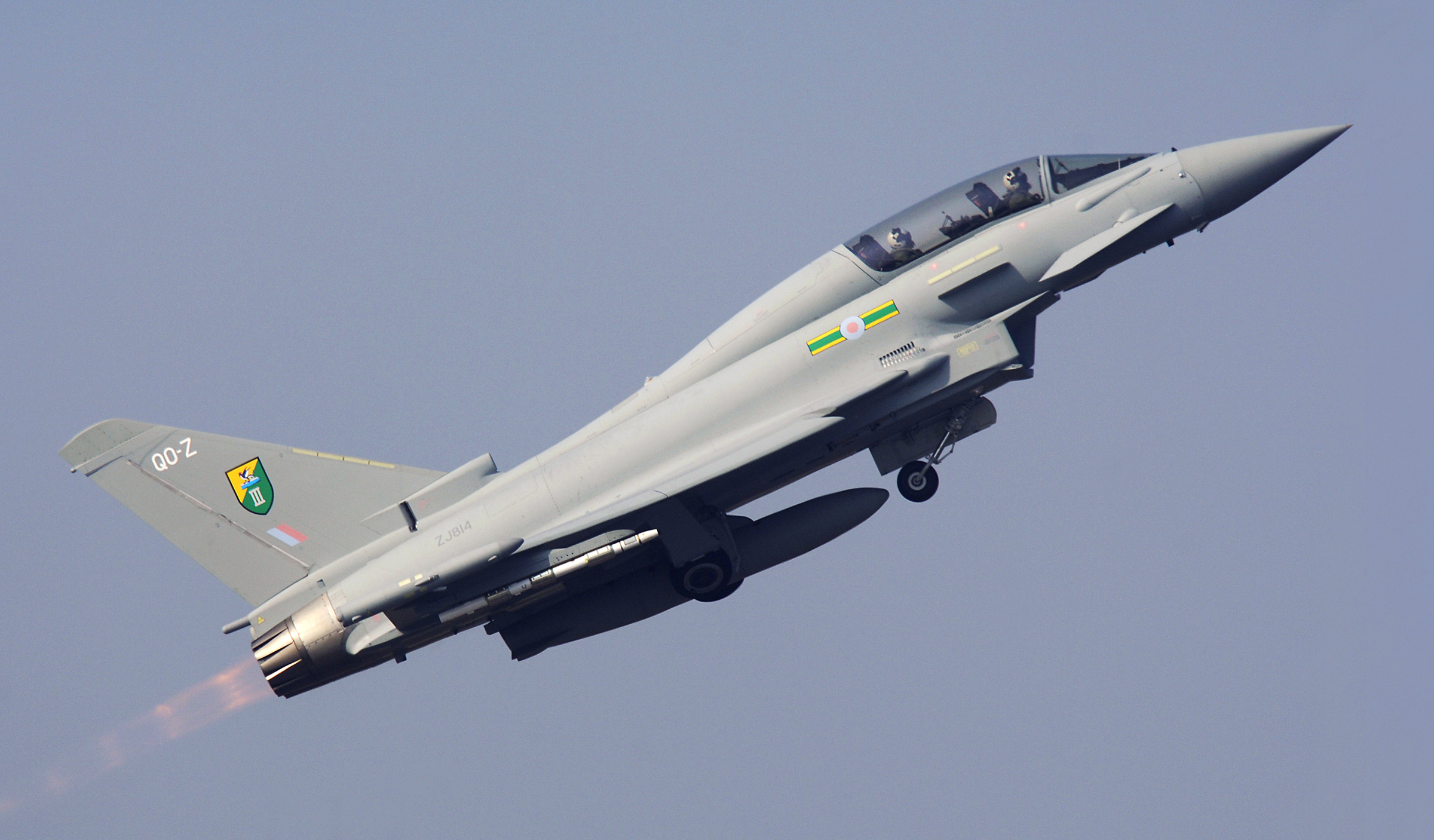
A Eurofighter Typhoon T3 of No. 3 Squadron during 2007

In March 2011, the squadron deployed to Southern Italy to take part in Operation Ellamy in Libya in support of UN Security Council Resolution 1973.

In May 2012, four Typhoons were deployed to RAF Northolt in an air defence role covering the duration of the London 2012 Summer Olympics, the first time RAF fighters had been stationed at the station since the Second World War.

Between April and August 2017, four of the squadron's Typhoons were deployed to Mihail Kogălniceanu Air Base, Romania as part of Operation Biloxi. During this deployment, the squadron fighters flew on over 280 training sorties and one sortie in response to Russian Air Force activity over the Black Sea.

During March 2018, six Typhoons from No. 3 Squadron deployed to Andravida Air Base in Greece for Exercise Iniochos 18. It was the first time that RAF Typhoons had participated in the annual NATO exercise.

On 3 September 2019, No. 3 Squadron deployed to Oman for two weeks to participate in Exercise Magic Carpet.

== Aircraft operated ==
- Sopwith Camel (September 1917 – February 1919)
- Sopwith Snipe (April 1920 – October 1921; April 1924 – October 1925)
- Airco DH.9A (October 1921 – October 1922)
- Westland Walrus (January 1922 – April 1923)
- Hawker Woodcock II (July 1925 – September 1928)
- Gloster Gamecock I (August 1928 – July 1929)
- Bristol Bulldog II (May 1929 – December 1932)
- Bristol Bulldog IIA (February 1931 – January 1932; December 1932 – June 1937)
- Gloster Gladiator I (March 1937 – March 1939; July 1938 – July 1939)
- Hawker Hurricane I (March–July 1938; July 1939 – April 1941)
- Hawker Hurricane IIA/IIB (April – November 1941)
- Hawker Hurricane IIC (April 1941 – May 1943)
- Hawker Typhoon IB (February 1943 – April 1944)
- Hawker Tempest V (February 1944 – April 1948)
- de Havilland Vampire F.1 (April 1948 – May 1949)
- de Havilland Vampire FB.5 (May 1949 – May 1953)
- Canadair Sabre F.2/F.4 (May 1953 – June 1956)
- Hawker Hunter F.4 (May 1956 – June 1957)
- Gloster Javelin FAW.4 (January 1959 – December 1960)
- English Electric Canberra B(I).8 (January 1961 – January 1972)
- Hawker Siddeley Harrier GR.1A/T.2 (January 1972 – March 1977)
- Hawker Siddeley Harrier GR.3 (December 1973 - January 1990)
- Hawker Siddeley Harrier T.4 (March 1977 – May 1989)
- BAe Harrier GR.5/T.4 (May 1989 – February 1992)
- BAe Harrier GR.7/T.10 (February 1992 – 31 March 2006)
- BAE Harrier GR.7A (2004 – 31 March 2006)
- Eurofighter Typhoon F2 (1 April 2006 – July 2008)
- Eurofighter Typhoon FGR4/T3 (3 June 2011 – present)

== Heritage ==
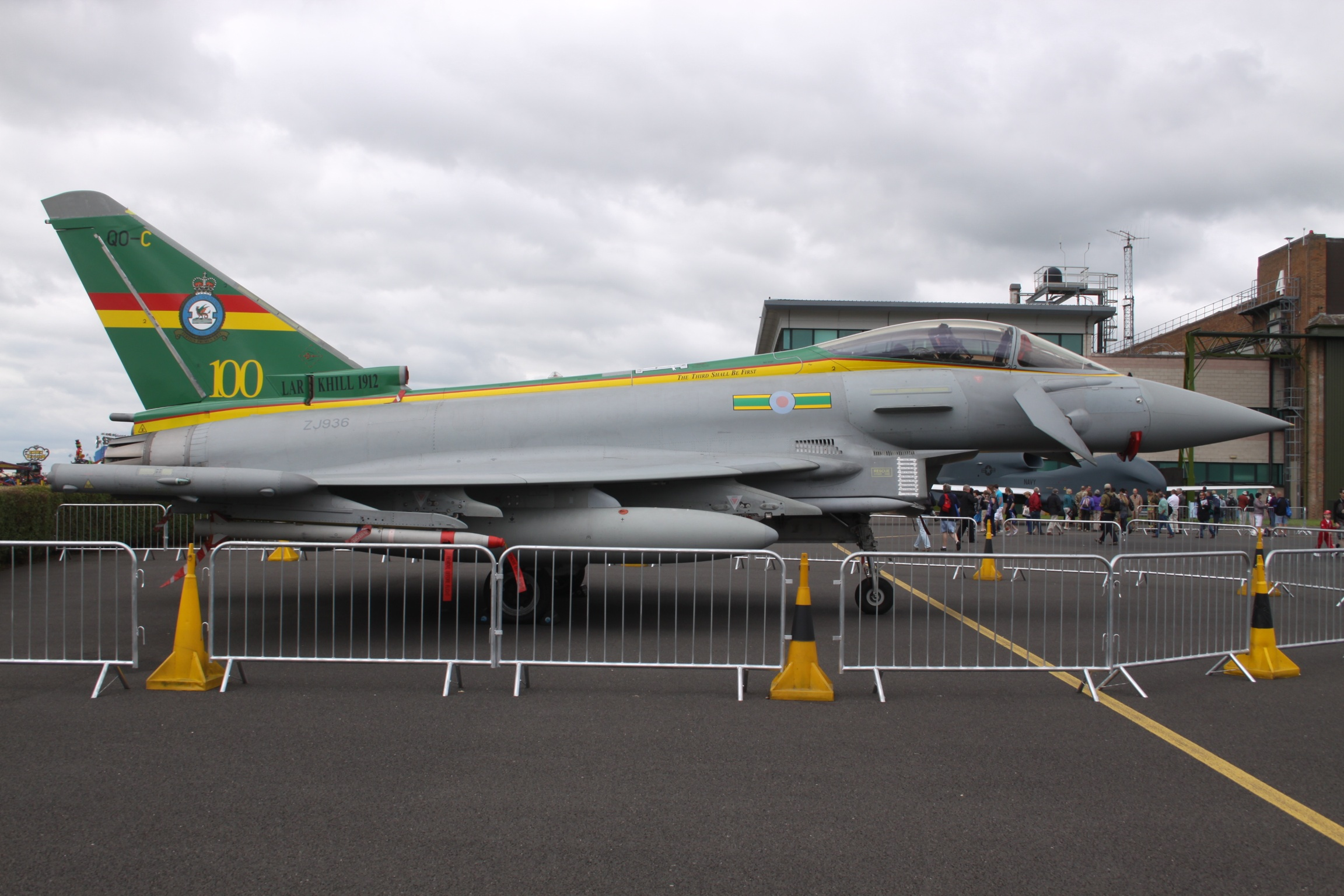
A Typhoon FGR4 wearing a commemorative paint scheme in 2012 to celebrate the 100th anniversary of No. 3 Squadron's formation

=== Badge and motto ===
Approved by King George VI in September 1937, the squadron's badge features a cockatrice on a monolith against a yellow and green background. The monolith relates to the ancient monument Stonehenge, which is near Larkhill where the squadron was first established in 1912. The mythological cockatrice is described as being the first creature to fly, reflecting the squadron's status as the first British, Empire or Commonwealth unit to operate ‘heavier-than-air’ aircraft. This is also reflected in the squadron's motto Tertius primus erit (Latin for 'The third shall be the first').

=== Call signs ===
As of March 2025, aircraft operated by No. 3 Squadron use the following peacetime air traffic control call signs within UK airspace: Brutal, Chaos, Hulk, Nightmare, and Rampage.

== Battle honours ==
The battle honours awarded to No. 3 Squadron. Those marked with an asterisk (*) may be emblazoned on the squadron standard.

- Western Front (1914–1918)*
- Mons (1914)*
- Neuve Chapelle (1915)
- Loos (1915)
- Somme (1916)
- Cambrai (1917)
- Somme (1918)*
- Hindenburg Line (1918)
- France and Low Countries (1940)*
- Battle of Britain (1940)*
- Home Defence (1940–1945)
- Fortress Europe (1942–1944)
- Channel and North Sea (1943–1945)
- Normandy (1944)*
- Arnhem (1944)*
- Rhine (1944–1945)
- France and Germany (1944–1945)*
- Iraq (2003)*
- Libya (2011)

== Commanding officers ==
Partial list of commanding officers of No. 3 Squadron, including date of appointment.

- Major H R M Brooke-Popham (13 May 1912)
- Major J M Salmond (12 August 1914)
- Major D S Lewis (April 1915)
- Major E R Ludlow-Hewitt (1 November 1915)
- Major H D Harvey-Kelly (January 1916)
- Major D E Stodart (September 1916)
- Major E D Horsfall (May 1917)
- Major J A De Courcy (Jun 1917)
- Major R Raymond-Barker (Sep 1917)
- Major R St Clair-McClintock (April 1918)
- Squadron Leader G G A Williams (December 1920)
- Squadron Leader D G Donald (June 1922)
- Squadron Leader C C Miles (February 1923)
- Squadron Leader J C Russel (April 1924)
- Squadron Leader J M Robb (April 1926)
- Squadron Leader E D Johnson (September 1927)
- Squadron Leader C A Stevens (August 1930)
- Squadron Leader G Martyn (March 1934)
- Squadron Leader H L P Lester (March 1936)
- Squadron Leader H H Chapman (August 1938)
- Squadron Leader P Gifford (November 1939)
- Squadron Leader W M Churchill (May 1940)
- Squadron Leader S F Godden (June 1940)
- Squadron Leader G F Chater (September 1940)
- Squadron Leader A W Cole (November 1940)
- Squadron Leader R E Barnett (January 1941)
- Squadron Leader E P P Gibbs (January 1941)
- Squadron Leader R F Aitken (April 1941)
- Squadron Leader A E Berry (April 1942)
- Squadron Leader L F De Soomer (August 1942)
- Squadron Leader S R Thomas (August 1943)
- Squadron Leader R Hawkins (September 1943)
- Squadron Leader A C Dredge (October 1943)
- Squadron Leader K A Wigglesworth (August 1944)
- Squadron Leader H N Sweetman (September 1944)
- Squadron Leader K F Thiele (January 1945)
- Squadron Leader R B Cole (February 1945)
- Squadron Leader C H Macfie (May 1947)
- Squadron Leader D R Griffiths (November 1949)
- Squadron Leader W J S Sutherland (June 1952)
- Squadron Leader D C H Simmons (December 1953)
- Squadron Leader T H Hutchinson (December 1954)
- Wing Commander D W B Farrar (January 1959)
- Wing Commander A F Peers (May 1960)
- Wing Commander D G Walker (January 1961)
- Wing Commander D F C Ross (January 1961)
- Wing Commander J L Field (July 1963)
- Wing Commander L E H Scotchmer (July 1965)
- Wing Commander R Hollingworth (May 1967)
- Wing Commander M R T Chandler (December 1969)

== See also ==
- List of Royal Air Force aircraft squadrons
