= Brebières =

- Commune
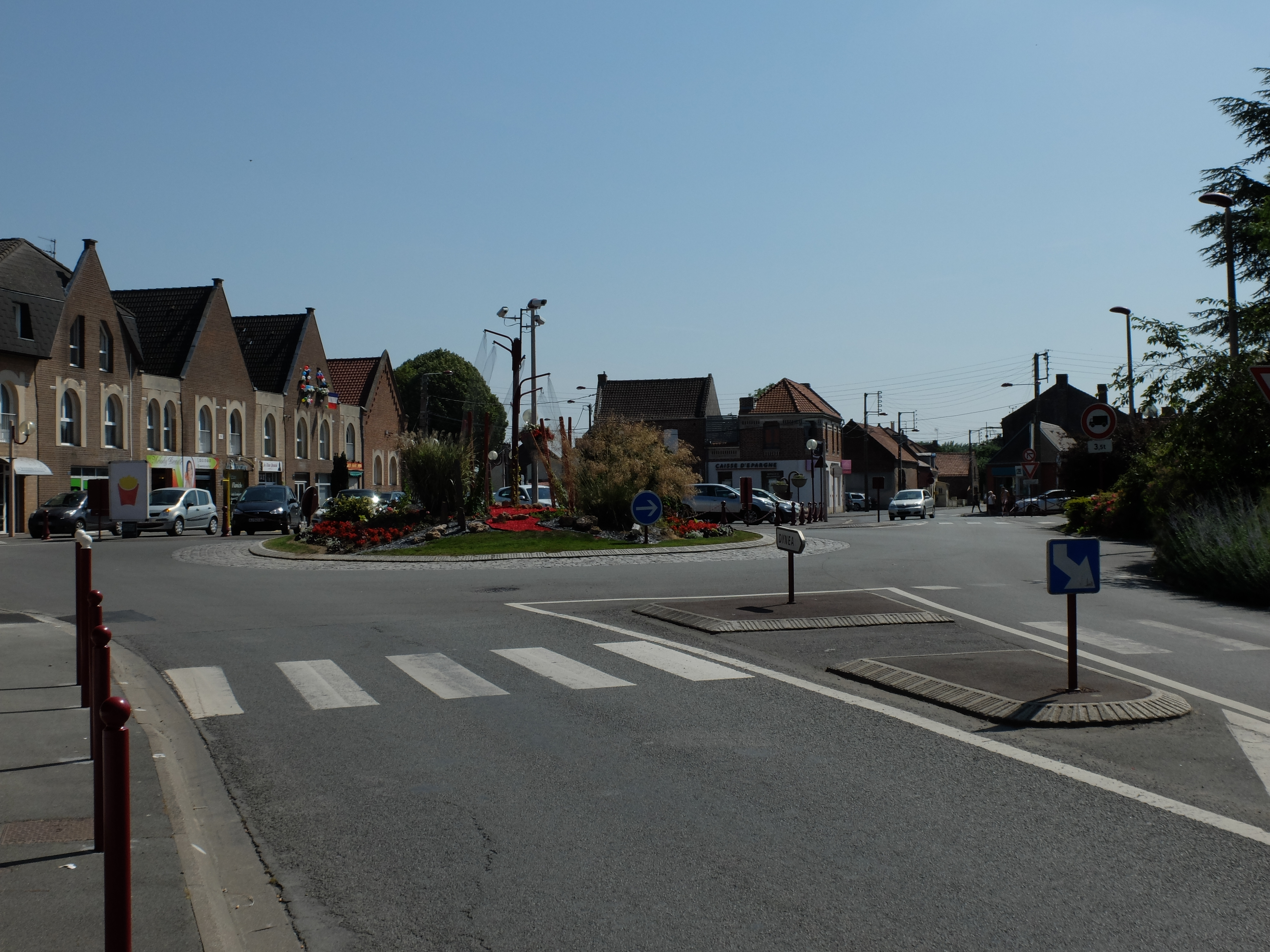
- The Place des héros, in Brebières

- Coat of arms
- Location of Brebières
- Location within France Location within Hauts-de-France
- Coordinates: 50°20′15″N 3°01′25″E
- Country: France
- Region: Hauts-de-France
- Department: Pas-de-Calais
- Arrondissement: Arras
- Canton: Brebières
- Intercommunality: CC Osartis Marquion

Government
  - Mayor (2020–2026): Lionel David
- Area^{1}: 10.8 km^{2} (4.2 sq mi)
- Elevation: 43 m (141 ft)
- Highest elevation: 48 m (157 ft)
- Lowest elevation: 25 m (82 ft)
- Population (2023): 5,283
  - Density: 489/km^{2} (1,270/sq mi)
- Time zone: UTC+01:00 (CET)
  - Summer (DST): UTC+02:00 (CEST)
- INSEE/Postal code: 62173 /62117
- ^{1} French Land Register data, which excludes lakes, ponds, glaciers > 1 km^{2} (0.386 sq mi or 247 acres) and river estuaries.

Brebières is a commune in the Pas-de-Calais department in the Hauts-de-France region in northern France.

== Geography ==
This farming and light industrial town is located 12 miles (19 km) east of Arras on the N50 road, at the junction with the D44 and D307, by the banks of the Scarpe river.

A celebration of the potato takes place annually on the first Sunday in September.

== History ==
Evidence of occupation from Merovingian times has been unearthed. In 2008, during the creation of the 60 hectare Bèliers industrial zone, three important archaeological sites, once occupied by Gauls and Celts, were discovered. Finds include the residue of iron smelting, glass beads, pottery and bones of both animals and humans.

== Population ==
Historical population
| Year | Pop. | ±% p.a. |
|---|---|---|
| 1968 | 4,238 | — |
| 1975 | 4,285 | +0.16% |
| 1982 | 4,307 | +0.07% |
| 1990 | 4,324 | +0.05% |
| 1999 | 4,424 | +0.25% |
| 2007 | 4,929 | +1.36% |
| 2012 | 4,866 | −0.26% |
| 2017 | 5,023 | +0.64% |
| 2023 | 5,283 | +0.84% |
Source: INSEE

== Sights ==
- The Church of St. Vaast, reconstructed after 1918
- The Château de La Bucquière

== See also ==
- Communes of the Pas-de-Calais department
