= Edwin Hayne =

Edwin Tufnell Hayne DSC DFC
- Born: 28 May 1895; Johannesburg, South African Republic
- Died: 28 April 1919 (aged 23); Castle Bromwich, Warwickshire
- Burial place: Saints Mary and Margaret Churchyard, Castle Bromwich
- Military career
- Allegiance: South Africa
- Branch: Aviation
- Service years: 1915 - 1919
- Rank: Captain
- Unit: No. 3 Squadron RNAS/No. 203 Squadron RAF
- Conflicts: World War I
- Awards: Distinguished Service Cross; Distinguished Flying Cross

Captain Edwin Tufnell Hayne DSC DFC was a World War I flying ace credited with 15 aerial victories.

== Early life ==
Edwin Tufnell Hayne was the son of Emily and Tufnell Hayne. He was born in Johannesburg, South African Republic. He attended King Edward VII School, which opened in 1902.

== Accidental death ==
Hayne took off from the Castle Bromwich in Bristol F.2 Fighter serial number F5098 with Major Maurice Perrin in the back seat. The plane's engine died and Hayne tried to turn and land. The plane stalled and fell. Hayne died in the crash; Perrin died later in hospital.

== Honors and awards ==
Distinguished Service Cross (DSC)

(As announced in Supplement to the London Gazette, 30 November 1917.)

In recognition of his services with a wing of the R.N.A.S. at Dunkirk between March and September 1917. He had numerous engagements with enemy aircraft and on 16 August 1917, attacked an enemy aerodrome and placed a whole flight of machines out of action by machine-gun fire. During a flight of over two hours, during which time he attacked transport and railways, he never exceeded a height of 1,000 foot.

Distinguished Flying Cross (DFC)

(As announced in Supplement to the London Gazette, 21 September 1918.)

During the recent enemy offensive, this Officer carried out 48 special missions. Flying at extremely low altitudes he has inflicted heavy casualties on massed troops and transport. In addition, he has accounted for 10 enemy machines, destroying 3 and driving down 7 out of control; in these encounters he has never hesitated to engage the enemy, however superior in numbers. On one occasion he observed 10 hostile aeroplanes harassing 3 Dolphines; he attacked 3 of the enemy, driving one down in flames.
