= Robert McLaughlin (RAF officer) =

British World War I flying ace (1896–??)

- Born: 23 July 1896; Belfast, Ireland
- Died: Unknown
- Military career
- Allegiance: United Kingdom
- Branch: British Army; Royal Air Force
- Service years: 1917–1919
- Rank: Captain
- Unit: No. 201 Squadron RAF
- Conflicts: World War I; Western Front
- Awards: Distinguished Flying Cross

Lieutenant Robert McLaughlin DFC (born 23 July 1896) was a British World War I flying ace credited with six aerial victories.

== Military service ==
McLaughlin was commissioned from cadet to temporary second lieutenant (on probation) on the General List of the Royal Flying Corps on 2 August 1917, and was confirmed in his rank on 15 November.

He was posted to No. 201 Squadron in France, flying the Sopwith Camel single-seat fighter. He gained his first aerial victory on 9 May 1918 by destroying an Albatros D.V over Bapaume. On 15 May he repeated the feat, which he shared with Major Charles Dawson Booker, Captain Samuel Kinkead, Lieutenants Maxwell Findlay, R. Hemmens, James Henry Forman, Hazel LeRoy Wallace, Reginald Brading, and R. S. S. Orr. On 30 May he drove another D.V down out of control over Achiet-le-Grand.

On the morning of 8 August, he was shot down in flames, and although slightly injured, insisted on flying another combat patrol that afternoon. For his actions on that day he was awarded the Distinguished Flying Cross, which was gazetted on 1 November 1918. His citation read:

Lieutenant Robert McLaughlin.

"On the morning of 8th August this officer successfully bombed enemy transport and engaged three machine-gun sections, killing and scattering these detachments. Later on, while bombing a dump, he was attacked by eight Fokkers, who shot him down in flames. Except for slight burns he escaped injury, and, returning to his squadron, he was once more flying in the afternoon, having specially requested to be allowed to do so. A splendid example of courage and determination."

On 12 August McLaughlin shared with Captain H. R. de Wilde and Lieutenant Ronald Sykes in the destruction of two Fokker D.VIIs over St. Christ. He was appointed a flight commander with the temporary rank of captain on 27 August. His sixth and final victory was on 16 September when he drove down another Fokker D.VII south-east of Cambrai.

McLaughlin was transferred to RAF's unemployed list on 8 March 1919, and relinquished his commission on the 14th.
