= Richard Minifie =

Australian fighter pilot and flying ace of the First World War

Richard Pearman Minifie
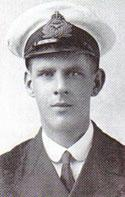
- Richard Minifie, c. 1916–1919
- Born: 2 February 1898; Alphington, Victoria
- Died: 31 March 1969 (aged 71); Malvern, Victoria
- Military career
- Allegiance: United Kingdom; Australia
- Branch: Royal Naval Air Service; Royal Australian Air Force
- Service years: 1916–19 c. 1941–45
- Rank: Squadron Leader
- Unit: No. 1 (Naval) Squadron RNAS
- Conflicts: First World War; Western Front; Battle of Arras; Battle of Messines; Battle of Passchendaele; Second World War
- Awards: Distinguished Service Cross & Two Bars
- Other work: Managing Director of James Minifie & Co. Pty Ltd (1949–66); President of the Federal Council of Flour Millowners of Australia (1949–66)

Richard Pearman Minifie, DSC & Two Bars (2 February 1898 – 31 March 1969) was an Australian fighter pilot and flying ace of the First World War. Born in Victoria, he attended Melbourne Church of England Grammar School. Travelling to the United Kingdom, he enlisted in the Royal Naval Air Service in June 1916. Accepted for flight training, he completed his instruction in December and joined No. 1 (Naval) Squadron RNAS on the Western Front in January 1917, flying Sopwith Triplanes. He went on to score seventeen aerial victories on this type of machine throughout the year, becoming both the youngest Australian flying ace of the First World War and No. 1 (Naval) Squadron's highest-scoring ace on the Triplane. The unit re-equipped with the Sopwith Camel late in 1917, with Minifie going on to achieve a further four victories on the aircraft, raising his final tally to a score of twenty-one aircraft shot down.

Minifie crash-landed in German-held territory in March 1918, and spent the remainder of the war in prisoner-of-war camps in Germany. He was released at the end of the war, and was demobilised as a captain in September 1919. Returning to Australia, he joined the staff of his father's flour milling business, James Minifie & Co. Pty Ltd. He served as a squadron leader in the Air Training Corps of the Royal Australian Air Force during the Second World War. Minifie returned to the flour milling industry after the war, becoming managing director of James Minifie & Co. Pty Ltd in 1949. He died in 1969 at the age of seventy-one.

== Early life ==
Richard Pearman Minife was born in Alphington, Victoria, on 2 February 1898 to Englishman James Minifie, a flour miller, and his Australian wife Beatrice Kate (née Earle). In his youth, Minifie attended Melbourne Church of England Grammar School, becoming a prefect in 1915 and being appointed a lieutenant in the school Cadet unit. Completing his secondary studies later that year, Minifie won a scholarship to Trinity College at the University of Melbourne.

== First World War ==
By 1916, Minifie was residing in Elsternwick, Victoria. That year, he decided to postpone his studies and travelled to the United Kingdom where he enlisted in the Royal Naval Air Service at Crystal Palace, London on 11 June. Accepted for flight training with the rank of probationary flight sub-lieutenant, he spent the following six months at naval establishments in Eastbourne, Cranwell, East Fortune and Dover earning his wings. Granted the substantive rank of flight sub-lieutenant in October, he was posted to No. 1 Wing RNAS on graduating as a pilot in October. In early 1917, he was allotted to the Wing's No. 1 (Naval) Squadron in France, flying Sopwith Triplanes, an aircraft in which he was to score heavily.

Throughout February and March 1917, No. 1 Squadron was "continually in action" along the Somme sector of the Western Front. During April, the squadron maintained a high operational tempo with the launch of the Arras offensive. In an air battle on 29 April, Minifie was credited with his first two aerial victories, shooting down an Albatros D.III in a solo effort, before sharing in the destruction of a second with fellow Australian, Flight Sub-Lieutenant Robert A. Little of No 8 (Naval) Squadron. Over the next two months, Minifie participated in the "highly effective" ground-strafing missions on Bullecourt and during the Battle of Messines, while simultaneously adding to his tally of aircraft brought down; he became an ace during this period. At 19 years of age, Minifie was the youngest Australian ace of the First World War. He was promoted to acting flight lieutenant in July, taking part in the Passchendaele offensive later that month. On 8 August, Minifie destroyed a German scout plane, forcing the machine down in flames and thus scoring his seventh victory. Ten days later, he executed a raid on two German aerodromes. Flying at a height of 400 feet (120 m), he fired approximated 450 rounds of ammunition into the hangars. Cited for his efforts in bringing down several German aircraft and his assaults on ground targets between April and September, Minifie was awarded the Distinguished Service Cross. The notice for the decoration was promulgated in a supplement to the London Gazette on 2 November 1917.

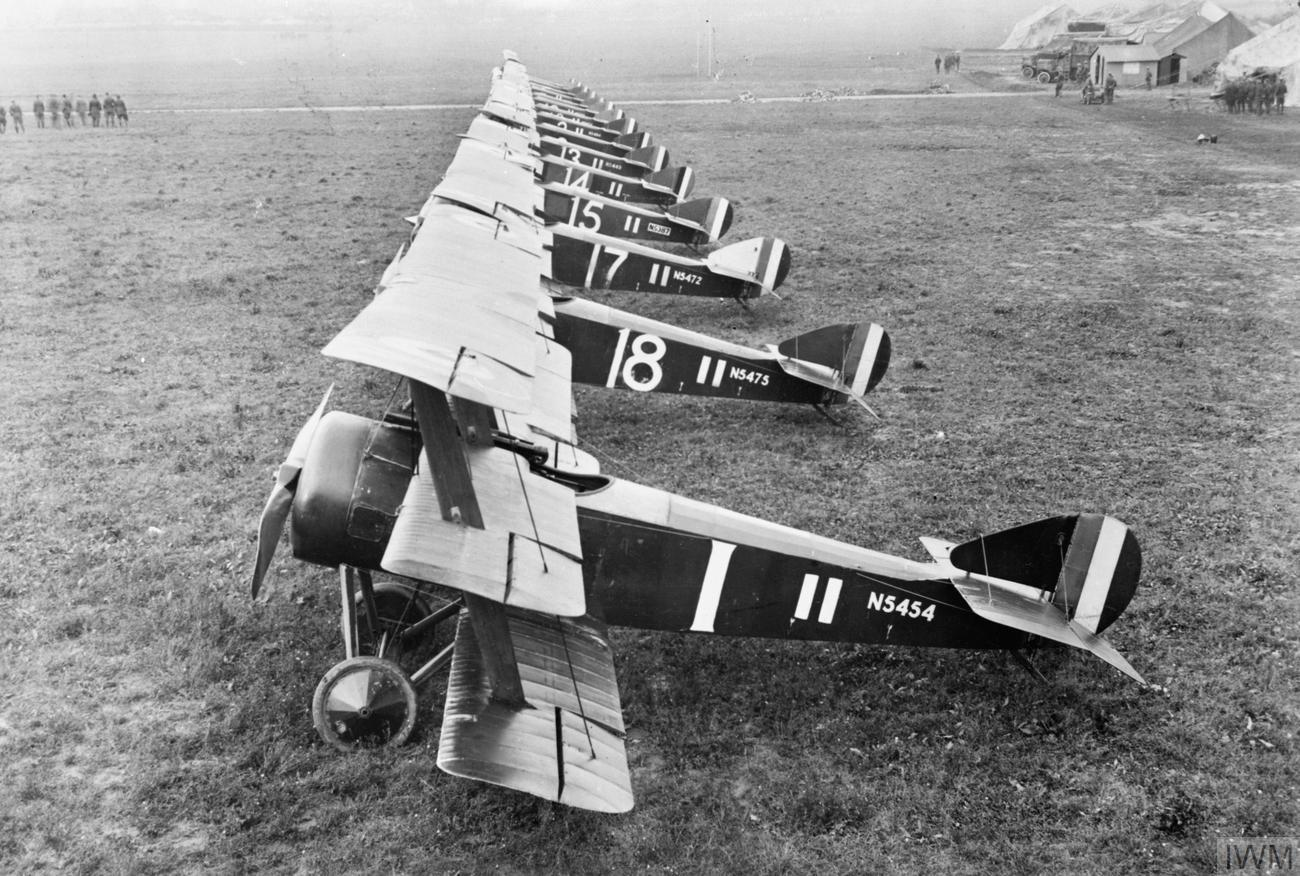
Sopwith Triplanes of No. 1 (Naval) Squadron in Bailleul, France, October 1917. The aircraft nearest the camera (N5454) was primarily flown by Minifie, a machine he scored ten "kills" in.

Between August and October 1917, Minifie was credited with a further eleven German aircraft, bringing his total to seventeen. He had thus far achieved all of his victories on the Sopwith Triplane, making him No. 1 Squadron's highest-scoring ace on the aircraft, besting his commanding officer and friend, fellow Australian ace Lieutenant Commander Roderic Dallas, by a single victory on the machine. In late October, the squadron returned to the United Kingdom in order to re-equip with the Sopwith Camel. On 30 November, the London Gazette carried the announcement that Minifie had been awarded a Bar to his Distinguished Service Cross as a consequence of his "conspicuous gallantry in air fighting throughout October", that resulted in his personal destruction of "several enemy machines".

On returning to the Western Front, Minifie went on to score an additional four aerial victories on the Sopwith Camel. In March 1918, he was promoted to acting flight commander. Later that month, he acted as No. 1 Squadron's commanding officer during the transition of command from Dallas to Lieutenant Commander Charles Dawson Booker. On 13 March, Minifie led a party of four aircraft out on a patrol. While airborne, the group intercepted a formation of five German scout planes. In the ensuring battle, Minifie personally destroyed two of the aircraft while a third was shot down by one of his men. These two scout planes were to be Minifie's final victories of the war, raising his ultimate tally to twenty-one aircraft shot down and making him the seventh highest-scoring Australian ace of the conflict. His aerial achievements were composed of ten and one shared aircraft destroyed, eight and one shared out of control, and one captured. As a result of his gallantry while operating against hostile forces, particularly in the air battle of 13 March, Minifie was awarded a second Bar to his Distinguished Service Cross. The announcement and accompanying citation was published in the London Gazette on 17 April 1918, reading:

HONOURS FOR THE ROYAL NAVAL AIR SERVICE.

The KING has been graciously pleased to approve of the award of the following decorations and medals to Officers and Men of the Royal Naval Air Service:—

To receive a Second Bar to the Distinguished Service Cross.

Act. Flt. Cdr. Richard Pearman Minifie, D.S.C., R.N.A.S.

For courage and daring in the face of the enemy, particularly on the 13th March, 1918. On that date, when on patrol with four machines, he attacked an enemy patrol of five scouts, destroying two, whilst a third was destroyed by another officer.

Act. Flt. Cdr. Minifie has now destroyed numerous hostile machines.

On 17 March 1918, Minifie took off in his Camel on a sortie. During the flight, he was forced to crash land in German-held territory near Houthulst Forest, Belgium. The exact circumstances of why he was forced to land are unknown, but it came as a result of either being shot down during a duel with Jasta 47's Friedrich Ehmann or Minifie's machine suffering engine failure. He was subsequently captured by German forces at Roulers, and taken as a prisoner of war; he spent the remainder of the war at prison camps in Karlsruhe and Clausthal, Germany. Roderic Dallas later wrote to Minifie's mother, informing her that Richard had been taken as a prisoner of war. In the letter he described Minifie as "a brilliant pilot and air fighter", and stated that "his aerial victories were gained by clean, clever fighting and he was always so modest about his great achievements". On 1 April, the Royal Naval Air Service and Royal Flying Corps were combined to form the Royal Air Force, with personnel from the former services transferring to the new branch; Minifie was promoted to captain the same day. He was released from captivity following the Armistice with Germany in November 1918, returning to the United Kingdom on 13 December 1918. Minifie returned to Australia in May 1919, and was placed on the Royal Air Force's unemployed list on 1 November.

== Post-war career and later life ==
Back in Australia, Minifie took up his scholarship, studying mathematics and science at the University of Melbourne. However, he soon withdrew from the course, opting to join his father's flour milling business, James Minifie & Co. Pty Ltd. In a ceremony at the Holy Trinity Church in Kew on 19 October 1921, Minifie married Nellie Frances Roberts; the couple would have four children. His father died the next year and, in collaboration with his brother James and his father's business partner, James Gatehouse, he continued to manage and run James Minifie & Co. Pty Ltd. Over the subsequent three decades, the trio were successful in furthering their business ventures, significantly expanding the company.

On 17 June 1941, Minifie enlisted in the Royal Australian Air Force for service in the Second World War, and was accepted as an officer with the Prahran Wing of the Air Training Corps. Promoted to flying officer and granted the acting rank of squadron leader on 23 August, he was appointed in commander of No. 1 Squadron of No. 1 Cadet Wing. Returning to the flour milling business after the war, he was appointed president of the Victorian Flour Millers' Association in 1948. The following year, Minifie was made managing director of James Minifie & Co. Pty Ltd and its associated companies, in addition to being selected as president of the Federal Council of Flour Millowners of Australia and the flour millowners' representative on the Australian Wheat Board. He relinquished these positions upon his retirement in 1966. Richard Minifie died on 31 March 1969 and was cremated. He was survived by his wife, son and three daughters.
