= Maxwell Findlay =

Scottish World War I flying ace

Maxwell Hutcheon Findlay
- Born: 17 February 1898; Aberdeen, Scotland
- Died: 1 October 1936 (aged 38); Abercorn, Northern Rhodesia
- Military career
- Allegiance: United Kingdom
- Branch: British Army; Royal Navy; Royal Air Force
- Service years: 1914–1920
- Rank: Captain
- Units: Black Watch (Royal Highland Regiment); No. 6 Squadron RNAS; No. 1 Squadron RNAS/No. 201 Squadron RAF
- Conflicts: World War I Third Anglo-Afghan War; Waziristan campaign
- Awards: Distinguished Service Cross; Distinguished Flying Cross
- Other work: Aviation sales manager and instructor; air racer

Captain Maxwell Hutcheon Findlay DSC, DFC (17 February 1898 – 1 October 1936) was a Scottish World War I flying ace credited with 14 aerial victories. He remained in the RAF postwar for several years before going on to a civilian aviation career that ended with his death in the Johannesburg Air Race of 1936.

== Early life ==
Maxwell Hutcheon Findlay was born on Aberdeen, Scotland on 17 February 1898.

== World War I ==
Findlay was a Scotsman living in Canada when World War I began. He returned to the British Isles to enlist in the Black Watch (Royal Highland Regiment). He later transferred to the Royal Naval Air Service, being promoted from probationary temporary flight officer to temporary flight sub-lieutenant on 16 April 1917. His first duty assignment, to No. 6 Naval Squadron, brought him two "out of control" victories over Albatros D.Vs in July and August 1917. He transferred to No. 1 Naval Squadron, and used a Sopwith Camel to score three more "out of control" wins on 15 November and 4 December 1917, as well as on 8 March 1918, to become an ace. On 10 March, he destroyed an Albatros D.V. On the 16th, his second win was shared with Hazel LeRoy Wallace. By 30 May, his score was 14, including a shared win with Wallace, Charles Dawson Booker, Samuel Kinkead, James Henry Forman, Robert McLaughlin, Reginald Brading, R. Hemmens, and R. S. S. Orr. On 25 April 1918 he was appointed a temporary captain in the Royal Air Force.

== Postwar career ==
On 1 August 1919 Findley was granted a permanent commission as a lieutenant in the RAF, and served in the Third Anglo-Afghan War and the Waziristan campaign. On 1 October 1920, Flying Officer Findlay resigned his commission and was permitted to retain the rank of flight lieutenant.

He then turned to farming in Scotland, gaining a first-class diploma in agriculture from Aberdeen University.

He also kept in touch with aviation; on 13 January 1925 Findlay was granted a commission in the RAF's Class "A" Reserves as a probationary flying officer, being confirmed in his rank on 13 July 1925. He relinquished his commission on completion of service on 13 January 1928, but was recommissioned as a flying officer in the Reserves on 11 May 1929.

In 1930 Findlay joined National Flying Services Ltd., serving as chief instructor until 1933. From there he went to Brooklands as an instructor and sales manager.

Findlay was killed on 1 October 1936, while taking part in The Schlesinger African Air Race, when his Airspeed Envoy crashed into trees on takeoff in Abercorn, Northern Rhodesia (now Mbala, Zambia).

== Honours and awards ==
Distinguished Service Cross
Flight Sub-Lieutenant Maxwell Hutcheon Findlay, RNAS.
For the courage and daring displayed by him as a pilot. On 8 March 1918, whilst on patrol, he engaged an Albatross scout, firing effectively from very close range. The enemy aircraft went down completely out of control. He has also destroyed or driven down out of control many other enemy machines.

Distinguished Flying Cross
Lieutenant (Temporary Captain) Maxwell Hutcheon Findlay, DSC.
A skilful and courageous patrol leader. During the past few months this officer has destroyed seven enemy machines and brought down seven more out of control. On one occasion he fought an enemy machine from 18,000 feet down to an altitude of 10,000 feet, at which point he gained an advantage and destroyed his antagonist.
