= Ehmann =

Ehmann is a German surname. Notable people with the name include:

- Anton Ehmann (born 1972), Austrian footballer
- Fabian Ehmann (born 1998), Austrian footballer
- Fabian Ehmann (politician) (born 1993), German politician
- Frank Ehmann, American basketball player
- Friedrich Ehmann, German World War I flying ace
- Gottfried Ehmann (1898—1953), German World War I flying ace
- Karl Ehmann (1882–1967), Austrian stage and film actor
- Marco Ehmann (born 2000), German-Romanian footballer
- Wilhelm Ehmann (1904–1989), German church musicologist, musician, director and founder of a church music school

== See also ==
- Ehlmann
- Ehman
