= Hazel Wallace =

Canadian World War I ace

- Born: Hazel LeRoy Wallace; 13 November 1897; Lethbridge, Alberta, Canada
- Died: 22 March 1976 (aged 78)
- Military career
- Allegiance: England
- Branch: Royal Naval Air Service; Royal Air Force
- Rank: Captain
- Units: No. 9 Squadron RNAS, /No. 1 Squadron RNAS/No. 201 Squadron RAF, No. 3 Squadron RAF
- Awards: Distinguished Flying Cross

Captain Hazel LeRoy Wallace DFC (13 November 1897 – 22 March 1976) was a Canadian First World War flying ace, officially credited with 14 victories. His record shows him to have been a notable team player in squadron tactics.

== Military service ==
Wallace originally served with 9 Squadron of the Royal Naval Air Service in 1917 as a Sopwith Camel pilot. He won his first dogfights there, on 6 and 16 September 1917 with Joseph Stewart Temple Fall and several other pilots. He then transferred to 1 Squadron RNAS in early 1918. On 11 March 1918, he rendered an Albatros D.V inoperable. Five days later, he succeeded in a dogfight with Maxwell Findlay. On the 2nd May, he, Reginald Brading, Samuel Kinkead, and several other British pilots sent German observation plane out of control; Wallace thus became an ace.

On the 15th of May, Wallace, Findlay, Kinkead, Brading, Charles Dawson Booker, Robert McLaughlin, and three other British pilots destroyed an Albatros D.V. The same day he had a solo "out of control" win on the afternoon patrol, and another the next day put Wallace's tally at eight.

He then transferred to 3 Squadron as the commander of C Flight. On 20 July 1918, he and Adrian Franklyn drove a Hannover two-seater observation plane down out of control. He continued to win dogfights with his new unit–mostly solo victories, but one shared with George R. Riley–bringing his total to thirteen by 21 August. The next day, he became a balloon buster, bringing down a German observation balloon with Riley. Though he scored no further victories, his Distinguished Flying Cross was awarded on 2 November 1918.
