= Reginald Brading =

British World War I flying ace

Reginald Carey Brenton Brading
- Born: 4 May 1899; Croydon, Surrey, England
- Died: 26 July 1926 (aged 27); Vicinity of Baghdad, Iraq
- Military career
- Allegiance: United Kingdom
- Branch: Aviation
- Rank: Captain
- Units: No. 12 Squadron RNAS, No. 1 Squadron RNAS/No. 201 Squadron RAF
- Awards: Distinguished Flying Cross with Bar

Captain Reginald Carey Brenton Brading DFC* (14 May 1899 – 26 July 1926) was a British World War I flying ace credited with thirteen confirmed aerial victories.

== Early life ==
Reginald Carey Brenton Brading was born in Croydon on 4 May 1899.

== Career ==
Brading joined the Royal Naval Air Service on 12 June 1917, just a month past his eighteenth birthday. He trained in an operational squadron, 12 Naval, before being posted to 1 Naval in April 1918 as a Sopwith Camel pilot. On 2 May, he scored his first aerial victory when a squadron patrol caught a luckless German reconnaissance plane north of Albert and Brading, Samuel Kinkead, Hazel Wallace, and four other pilots sent it down out of control for a win apiece. On the 15th, Brading gained a second victory in similar fashion, teaming with Kinkead, Wallace, Charles Dawson Booker, Robert McLaughlin, Maxwell Findlay, James Henry Forman, and two other pilots to destroy an Albatros D.V to add to all their scores. Brading also received a second victory that day, for his solo win in driving a second Albatros D.V down out of control. His fourth triumph came on 9 June, when he drove a DFW reconnaissance plane down out of control. On 28 June, he became an ace by driving down another Albatros D.V. From there on, Brading's wins were always over the best German fighter planes, Fokker D.VIIs and a Pfalz D.XII. The only curiosity among them was the last pilot downed plummeted to his death in one of the pioneering uses of a parachute; that was on 16 September 1918.

A summary of his victories shows Brading was credited with five enemy airplanes destroyed, including that first shared one; eight driven down out of control, including the shared second win.

== Honors and awards ==
Text of the citation for the Distinguished Flying Cross (DFC)

Lieut (T./Capt.)"Reginald Carey Brenton Brading. This officer has accounted for seven enemy machines—two shot down in flames and five out of control. In addition he has displayed marked skill and bravery in attacking troops and transport. Four times in one day he engaged troops, etc., on the roads with machine-gun fire, inflicting casualties and causing great confusion.

Text of the citation for the Bar to the Distinguished Flying Cross (in lieu of second award)

Lieut (A./Capt.) Reginald Carey Brenton Brading, D.F.C. (FRANCE) An exceptionally keen and daring patrol leader who has accounted for five enemy machines during the last month. On 2 September, while leading his flight, he observed twelve Fokker biplanes, which he at once engaged, driving one down out of control. Later, on the same day, he engaged a formation of Fokkers that were harassing our corps machines, causing one to crash. This officer's skill and bravery have proved a great incentive to the other pilots of his squadron.
