= Ronald Sykes =

- Born: 3 March 1899; Stockton-on-Tees, England
- Died: 15 September 1977 (aged 78); Bredon, Gloucestershire, England
- Military career
- Allegiance: England
- Branch: Aviation
- Service years: 1917–1920
- Rank: Captain
- Units: No. 9 Squadron RNAS, No. 203 Squadron RAF, No. 201 Squadron RAF
- Awards: Distinguished Flying Cross, Russian Order of Saint Stanilas
- Other work: Served in Russia 1919–1920

Captain Ronald Sykes DFC (1899–1977) was a World War I flying ace credited with six aerial victories.

== World War I service ==
Sykes joined the Royal Naval Air Service in April 1917. In September, he joined 9 Naval Squadron to fly a Sopwith Camel in Roy Brown's flight. On the 20th, he shot down an Albatros D.III out of control, and was in turn shot down by Paul Baumer. Sykes evaded capture by the Germans and swam the Yser River to return to friendly forces. In March 1918, he joined Raymond Collishaw in 3 Naval Squadron. On 30 May, he scored again, driving down a Fokker Dr.I triplane. In early August 1918, he moved to 201 Squadron as a flight commander. On the 12th, he teamed with Robert McLaughlin and H. R. de Wilde to destroy two Fokker D.VIIs. Sykes would destroy another D.VII on 2 September, and drive one down on 9 November 1918.

== Postwar service ==
In 1919, Sykes served in northern Russia. His Camel's tension wires snapped, dropping him behind Russian lines. He was repatriated in 1920. He left the Royal Air Force and became an engineer.

== Honors and awards ==
Distinguished Flying Cross (DFC)

"Lieut. (A./Capt.) Ronald Sykes, 201 Squadron. (FRANCE)

An excellent patrol leader, who displayed marked gallantry on 27 September. While engaged in dropping bombs on enemy infantry in a sunken road he was attacked by four enemy aeroplanes. Out-manoeuvring them, he retired west. As soon as the hostile aeroplanes had withdrawn, he returned and fired a number of rounds into the infantry at 200 feet, causing many casualties. He then dived on another party of fifteen, who became so demoralised that they surrendered to one of our men."
