= Reginald Soar =

British flying ace

Reginald Rhys Soar
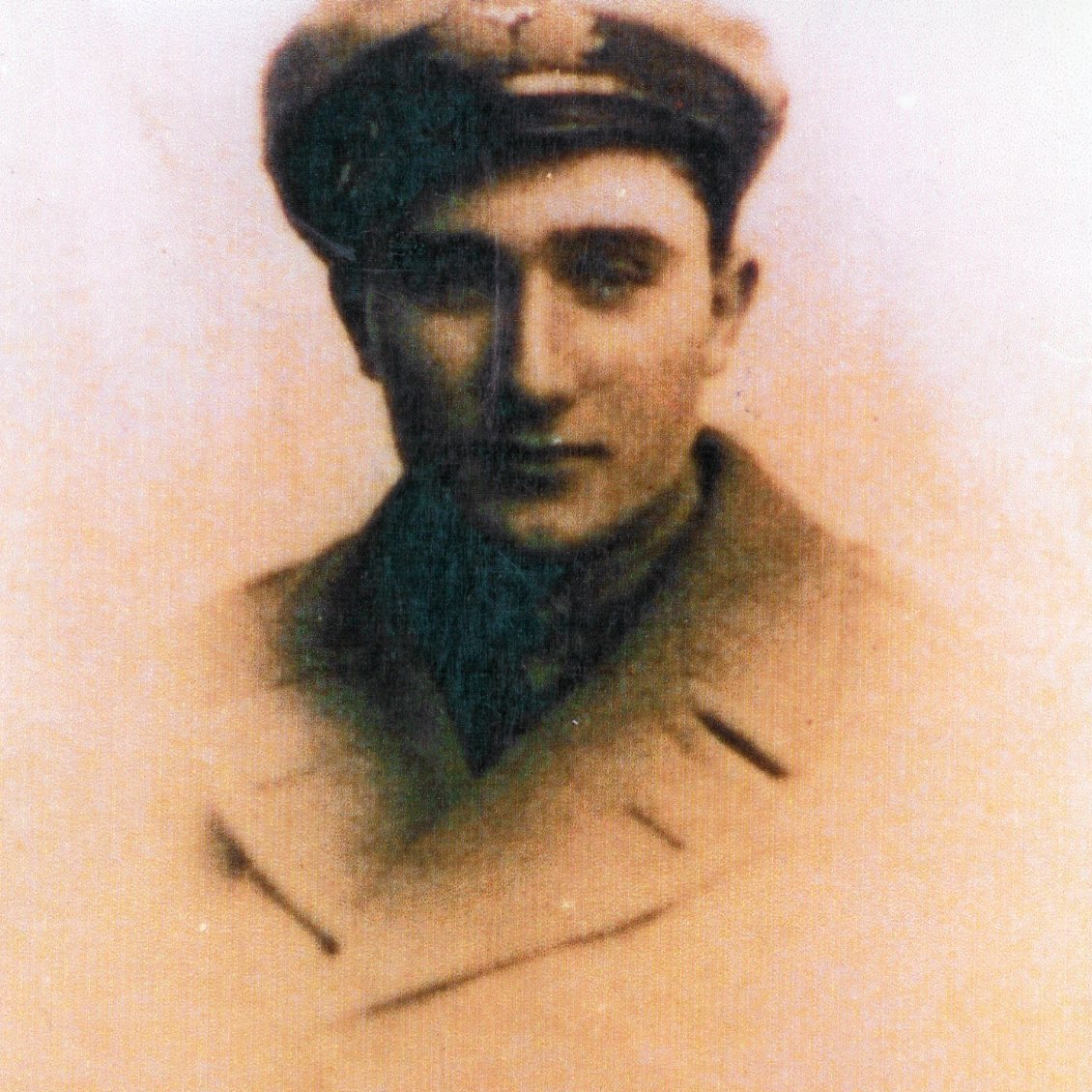
- Born: 24 August 1893; Castleford, Yorkshire, England
- Died: 1971; Martletwy, Pembrokeshire, Wales
- Military career
- Allegiance: England
- Branch: Aviation
- Rank: Captain
- Units: No.3 Wing RNAS, No.5 Wing RNAS, No.8 Squadron RNAS, No.255 Squadron RAF
- Awards: Distinguished Service Cross

Captain Reginald Rhys Soar DSC was a British flying ace during World War I. He was credited with 12 official aerial victories won while serving in the Dardanelles and along the English Channel.

== World War I ==
Soar joined the Royal Naval Air Service in August 1915. He began his naval air service with No. 3 Wing RNAS in the Dardanelles. He then transferred to 5 Naval Wing at Dunkirk. In October 1916, he transferred again, to 8 Naval Squadron.

Soar scored his first aerial victories on 20 December 1916, when he used Sopwith Pup serial number N5181 to drive two German Halberstadt fighter planes down out of control. He would not score again until after being re-equipped with a Sopwith Triplane.

On 23 May 1917, he drove a German reconnaissance plane down out of control to begin a string of ten victories. In his logbook, Soar noted that when the German plane landed at Sainte-Catherine-lès-Arras, the pilot had suffered a head wound while the observer was shot through the abdomen. Soar also noted technical details of this DFW in the back of his log.

Soar seems to have been a favored wingman to the leading Australian ace Robert A. Little, as they each often mention one another in their logbooks.

By 22 July, Soar had raised his score to an even dozen, sharing some of his wins with Charles Dawson Booker, Robert A. Little, and a couple of other squadronmates. Soar's final tally was two captured enemy reconnaissance planes shared with other pilots, a share in destroying a recon machine, and nine enemy planes driven down out of control. In official recognition of his exploits, he was awarded the Distinguished Service Cross, gazetted 11 August 1917.

Following the formation of the Royal Air Force (RAF) on 1 April 1918, Soar was appointed Officer Commanding 'A' and 'B' Flights, No.255 Squadron, RAF – in effect becoming Squadron Leader although his official rank was Honorary Captain. No.255 Squadron was based at RAF Pembroke (X0PK, formerly Royal Naval Air Station Pembroke, later RAF Carew Cheriton).

== Post World War I ==
Flight Lieutenant Soar was appointed to a short service commission as a flying officer in the Royal Air Force on 7 April 1921.

Reginald Rhys Soar died in Martletwy, Wales in 1971.

== Bibliography ==
- Franks, Norman (24 June 2004). Sopwith Triplane Aces of World War 1. Osprey Publishing. ISBN 978-1841767284.
