= Ehman =

Ehman is a German surname. Notable people with the surname include:

- Gerry Ehman (1932–2006), Canadian ice hockey player and scout
- Jerry R. Ehman, American astronomer best known for his work at SETI
- Jakob Ehman, Canadian actor best known for his role as Miles in the film adaptation of The Drawer Boy.

== See also ==
- Ehmann
