= Ehlmann =

Ehlmann is a surname. Notable people with the surname include:

- Bethany Ehlmann, American scientist
- Steve Ehlmann (born 1950), American politician

== See also ==
- Ehmann
