= Thomas Culling =

New Zealand flying ace

Thomas Grey Culling
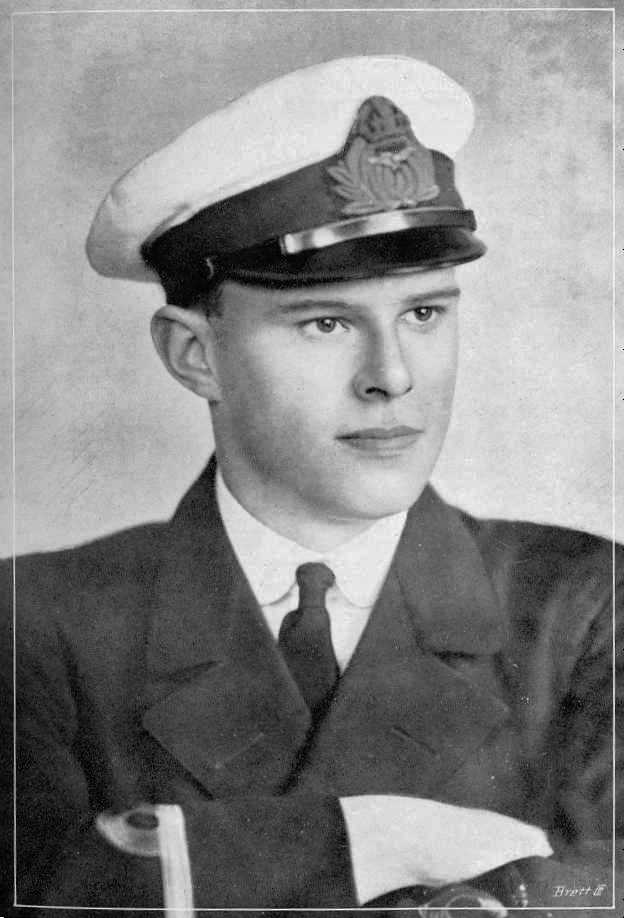
- Born: 31 May 1896; Dunedin, New Zealand
- Died: 8 June 1917 (aged 21); Warneton, France
- Military career
- Allegiance: British Empire
- Branch: Royal Naval Air Service
- Rank: Flight Lieutenant
- Unit: No. 1 Squadron RNAS
- Conflicts: First World War; Western Front
- Awards: Distinguished Service Cross

Flight Lieutenant Thomas Grey Culling DSC (31 May 1896 – 8 June 1917) was New Zealand's first flying ace of the First World War.

Born in Dunedin, New Zealand, Culling joined the Samoa Expeditionary Force following the outbreak of the First World War but was prevented from departing the country by his father, due to his age. He travelled to England in 1915 and joined the Royal Naval Air Service (RNAS). From September 1916, he flew with the No. 1 Squadron, RNAS, on the Western Front. He shot down his first German aircraft in April 1917 and would be credited with a total of six aerial victories, the first New Zealander to become a flying ace during the war, by the time of his death on 8 June 1917.

== Early life ==
Thomas Grey Culling was born on 31 May 1896 in Dunedin to a notable local family. His father, Thomas Shepherd Culling, was a businessman and local body politician, after whom Dunedin's Culling Park is named. His grandfather, also Thomas Culling, was a printer and paper mill director, and was one of Dunedin's early colonial settlers, arriving in the city just one year after its 1848 founding.

His family moved to the Auckland suburb of Remuera in 1906, and he was educated at King's College.

== First World War ==
Following the outbreak of the First World War, Culling volunteered for the Samoa Expeditionary Force, then being raised specifically for the capture of German Samoa. However, he was prevented from departing New Zealand by his father, who had contacted authorities, pointing out his age. Only men of 20 years or older were being allowed to serve aboard and Culling was still only 18.

The following year, in August, Culling left New Zealand for England to join the Royal Naval Air Service. In September 1916, as a flight sub-lieutenant, he was posted to No. 1 Squadron, which at the time was serving on the Western Front. Culling was assigned to fly Sopwith Triplane No. N5444 and began to score victories in Bloody April 1917, with his first three coming that month. The second one was significant; it was part of one of the war's epic dogfights. On 22 April, Culling was the wingman of the Australian ace, Roderic Dallas. The two pilots took on a formation of fourteen German planes; using air tactics that suited the Triplane's technological advantages, the two Naval aces thwarted the pending air offensive in a 45-minute dogfight that resulted in three German aircraft being shot down. The next day, Culling shot down a two-seater plane during a patrol that encountered a flight of nine aircraft.

Culling went on to shoot down three more German aircraft in May, becoming New Zealand's first "ace" of the First World War. Earlier in the month, he had received a promotion to flight lieutenant. He was killed the following month, on 8 June 1917. As part of a four-man flight dispatched to shoot down an intruder aircraft, he encountered seven German aircraft near Ypres and was shot down by Vizeflugmeister Hans Bottler of the Imperial German Navy. His body was never recovered.

Shortly after his death, he was posthumously recognised with the Distinguished Service Cross for his actions in the engagements of 22–23 April 1917. The medal was presented by the Earl of Liverpool, Governor-General of New Zealand, to his father in a ceremony at Auckland the following year.
