= Viktor Schobinger =

World War I flying ace

- Born: 30 April 1893; Ulm, Alb-Donau district, Kingdom of Württemberg, German Empire
- Died: 24 May 1989 (aged 96)
- Military career
- Allegiance: Germany
- Branch: Aviation (Luftstreitkräfte; Luftwaffe)
- Rank: Leutnant
- Unit: Flieger-Abteilung (Flier Detachment) 12, Jagdstaffel (Fighter Squadron) 12
- Awards: Royal House Order of Hohenzollern, Iron Cross

Leutnant Viktor Schobinger was a World War I flying ace credited with eight confirmed victories. Victory number two was confirmed over Charles Dawson Booker.

== Biography ==
See also Aerial victory standards of World War I

Viktor Schobinger was born in Ulm, Alb-Donau district, the Kingdom of Württemberg, in the German Empire on 30 April 1893. His original military service was in a machine gun company. However, he reported to Fliegerersatz-Abteilung (Replacement Detachment) 10 at Böblingen for pilot's training on 19 October 1916. He soloed in an LVG before being transferred to Armee-Flug-Park (Army Flight Park) 6 on 15 March 1917.

About a month later, he was posted to combat duty with Flieger-Abteilung (Flier Detachment) 12. After gaining experience there, he was forwarded to fighter conversion training at Jastaschule (Fighter Training). Once trained, he joined a fighter squadron, Jagdstaffel 12.

His first success with them came when he downed Bristol F.2 Fighter number A7114 over Feuchy at 2100 hours on 9 August 1917. However, Schobinger's most notable triumph came two days later. British Triplane ace Charles Dawson Booker shot down and severely wounded Schobinger's Staffelführer, Adolf von Tutschek. In turn, Schobinger saved Tutschek by sending Booker unhurt down behind British lines, but destroying his machine. The hospitalized Tutschek passed temporary command of his jasta to Schobinger. The latter would lead Jasta 12 for nine weeks without suffering losses. While in command, he would have a personal insignia of a light blue ovoid painted stretching down the side of his Albatros D.V's fuselage.

Schobinger continued to score until 31 October 1917, when he tallied his eighth victory. On 15 November 1917, Schobinger suffered a serious wound to his foot while in combat. The wound removed him from combat. Schobinger would finish out the war on instruction duty.

Schobinger had been awarded both classes of the Iron Cross; during 1918, he was also awarded the Knight's Cross with Swords of the House Order of Hohenzollern.

Viktor Schobinger would return to battle during World War II, commanding a bomber squadron in the Luftwaffe. He died on 24 May 1989.
