= George Gates (RAF officer) =

George Brian Gates
- Born: 21 July 1899; Hove, Sussex, England
- Died: 1 July 1975 (aged 75); Cuckfield, West Sussex, England
- Military career
- Allegiance: United Kingdom
- Branch: Royal Navy; Royal Air Force
- Service years: 1917–1919
- Rank: Captain
- Unit: No. 1 Squadron RNAS/No. 201 Squadron RAF
- Awards: Distinguished Flying Cross & Bar

Captain George Brian Gates DFC* (21 July 1899 – 1 July 1975) was a British World War I flying ace credited with 15 aerial victories, twelve of them enemy aircraft, and three observation balloons.

== Military service ==
Gates entered into the Royal Naval Air Service as a probationary flight officer (temporary) on 22 July 1917, and was promoted to flight sub-lieutenant on 14 November 1917.

Gates was posted to No. 1 Naval Squadron in early 1918, flying the Sopwith Camel. He gained his first victory on 15 March 1918, destroying a Pfalz D.III, east of Diksmuide. By the time of his second, driving down 'out of control' a Fokker Dr.I south of Albert on 16 May, the RNAS had been merged with the Army's Royal Flying Corps to form the Royal Air Force. On 16 July he accounted for a Rumpler reconnaissance aircraft and an observation balloon, and a destroyed a second balloon on 19 July. On 10 August he destroyed two Halberstadt aircraft south east of Rosières. On 27 August he was appointed a temporary captain. Gates shot down six more aircraft between 3 and 23 September, and finally another observation balloon on 27 September, before being wounded in action. He was awarded the Distinguished Flying Cross twice, which were both gazetted in November 1918.

After the war Gates left the RAF, being transferred to the unemployed list on 20 June 1919.

== Honours and awards ==
Distinguished Flying Cross
Lieutenant George Brian Gates

On a recent occasion this officer, single-handed, engaged two enemy two-seaters, bringing down both in flames. He has, in addition, destroyed a third machine and shot down two kite balloons in flames. On whatever duty engaged—bombing, attacking troops on the ground, or fighting in the air—this officer displays consistent courage and skill.

Bar to Distinguished Flying Cross
Lieutenant (Acting-Captain) George Brian Gates, DFC.

This officer sets a fine example to the other pilots of his squadron, being conspicuous for his cool courage and brilliant leadership. During the past month he has accounted for six enemy two-seaters, five being driven down in flames and one crashed.
