= Friedrich Ehmann =

- Born: Kingdom of Württemberg, German Empire
- Died: After 11 November 1918
- Military career
- Allegiance: Germany
- Branch: Aviation
- Rank: Vizefeldwebel (Staff Sergeant)
- Unit: Kest 5; Jasta 47
- Awards: Iron Cross First Class, Kingdom of Württemberg Military Merit Order

Vizefeldwebel Friedrich Ehmann was a German World War I flying ace credited with eight confirmed aerial victories. Possibly, two of his victims were enemy aces: Richard Minifie and Robert A. Little, though it cannot be confirmed. Both survived their respective crashes.

== Early life ==
Friedrich Ehmann's birthplace in the Kingdom of Württemberg can be deduced by its custom of awarding their military medals solely to their own citizens.

== World War I ==
Ehmann first comes to history's notice when he flew for Kest 5 from 22 October to 25 December 1917. During this time, he claimed his first aerial victory, which went unconfirmed.

He then transferred to an established fighter squadron, Jasta 47. Ehmann's second confirmed victory was over one of the leading Royal Naval Air Service aces, Richard Minifie, who had 21 victories. Minifie, who belonged to 1 Naval Squadron, came down unwounded on 17 March 1918, but sat out the remainder of the fighting as a prisoner of war.

On 21 April 1918, Ehmann downed his second enemy ace, Robert A. Little, who was the leading Australian ace of the war, scoring the majority of his wins in a RNAS Sopwith Triplane, shot down one of Ehmann's squadronmates. When Ehmann, in turn, shot Little down, he crashlanded unhurt behind British lines. Little reported the cause of his downing as a shattered main spar and bullet-riddled controls.

Ehmann was awarded Württemberg's Military Merit Order on 18 October 1918. He was also awarded the Iron Cross First Class.

== List of aerial victories ==
See also Aerial victory standards of World War I

Official victories are numbered and listed chronologically. Unconfirmed victories are denoted by "u/c" and may or may not be listed by date.

No.	Date/time	Aircraft	Foe	Result	Location	Notes
u/c	7 November 1917		Dorand AR.2		Dannemarie, Haut-Rhin	
1	11 March 1918 @ 1705 hours	Pfalz	Sopwith	Destroyed	Zonnebeke	
2	17 March 1918 @ 1215 hours	Pfalz	Sopwith Camel serialnumber B6420	Destroyed	Moorslede	Victim: Possibly Richard Minifie
3	18 March 1918 @ 1205 hours	Pfalz	Nieuport fighter	Destroyed	Hooglede	Victim from No. 29 Squadron RFC
4	12 April 1918 @ 1020 hours	Pfalz	Sopwith Camel	Destroyed	Frelinghien	Victim from No. 43 Squadron RAF
5	21 April 1918 @ 1630 hours	Pfalz	Sopwith Camel s/n B6319	Destroyed	Southeast of Hazebrouck	Victim: Possibly Robert A. Little
6	11 May 1918 @ 1835 hours	Pfalz	Royal Aircraft Factory SE.5a	Destroyed; sent down smoking	Messines	Victim from No. 1 Squadron RAF
7	28 May 1918 @ 2020 hours	Fokker D.VII	Royal Aircraft Factory SE.5a	Destroyed	Northwest of Vlamertinghe, Belgium	
8	28 May 1918 circa 2020 hours	Fokker D.VII	Royal Aircraft Factory SE.5a	Destroyed	Northwest of Vlamertinghe	

== Post World War I ==
Ehmann is known to have survived World War I.
