= Roderic Dallas =

Australian fighter pilot (1891–1918)

Roderic Stanley (Stan) Dallas
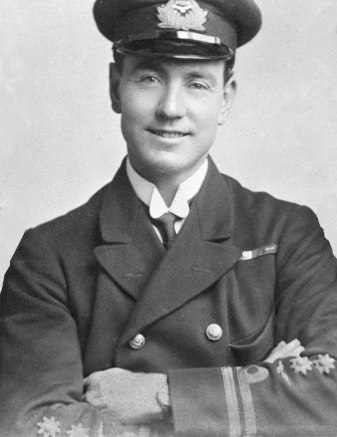
- Roderic (Stan) Dallas, 1918
- Born: 30 July 1891; Esk, Queensland, Australia
- Died: 1 June 1918 (aged 26); Liévin, France
- Military career
- Allegiance: Australia; United Kingdom
- Branch: Australian Military Forces (1913–15); Royal Naval Air Service (1915–18); Royal Air Force (1918)
- Service years: 1913–18
- Rank: Major
- Nicknames: "Breguet", "The Admiral"
- Commands: No. 1 Squadron RNAS (1917–18); No. 40 Squadron RAF (1918)
- Conflicts: World War I; Western Front; Battle of Arras
- Awards: Distinguished Service Order; Distinguished Service Cross & Bar; Mentioned in Despatches (2); Croix de guerre (France)

Roderic Stanley (Stan) Dallas, DSO, DSC & Bar (30 July 1891 – 1 June 1918) was an Australian fighter ace of World War I. His score of aerial victories is generally regarded as the second highest by an Australian, after Robert Little, but there is considerable dispute over Dallas's exact total. Though his official score is commonly given as 39, claim-by-claim analyses list as few as 32, and other research credits him with over 50, compared to Little's official tally of 47. Like Little, Dallas flew with British units, rather than the Australian Flying Corps. Beyond his personal combat record, Dallas achieved success as a squadron leader, both in the air and on the ground. He was also an influential tactician and test pilot. His service spanned almost the entirety of World War I fighter aviation.

Born on a remote property in rural Queensland, Dallas showed an early interest in aviation. He travelled to England at his own expense following the outbreak of World War I and became a pilot in the Royal Naval Air Service (RNAS) in August 1915. Initially seeing action with No. 1 Naval Wing on the Western Front in Caudrons and Nieuport 11s, he was chosen to test one of the earliest Sopwith Triplanes. This became his favourite type, and he achieved many victories with it through 1916–17, earning the Distinguished Service Order, and the Distinguished Service Cross and Bar. He was appointed commanding officer of No. 1 Squadron RNAS in June 1917. On the establishment of the Royal Air Force on 1 April 1918, he took command of No. 40 Squadron. Flying Royal Aircraft Factory S.E.5s, he achieved further victories before being killed in action on 1 June 1918 while on patrol near Liévin in northern France. He was buried in Pernes.

== Early life ==
Stan Dallas was born on 30 July 1891 at Mount Stanley station outside Esk, Queensland, to labourer Peter MacArthur Dallas and his wife Honora. Mount Stanley was an isolated property, and journeys to and from Esk were long and infrequent; Stan was the first Caucasian child born at the station. His family moved to Tenterfield, New South Wales, soon after the birth of his younger brother in 1893. They returned to Queensland in 1898, settling in Mount Morgan, where Peter Dallas became a shift boss at the local mines. Stan attended Mount Morgan Boys' School from February 1899 and eventually joined its cadet corps, rising to sergeant. At school he was noted for his intelligence, ability to get along well with others, and quiet sense of humour. He enjoyed the outdoors, and spent many hours in the mountains behind his family's home, observing birds of prey.

In July 1907, Dallas joined the assay office of the Mount Morgan Gold Mining Company, and also enrolled in the local technical college, where he took night classes in chemistry and technical drawing. He showed an early interest in aviation, fuelled by the establishment in 1911 of the Mount Morgan chapter of the Queensland Aero Club. Dallas and his younger brother Norvel built a glider, which was wrecked by an untimely gust of wind the first time they tried to launch it. The two brothers continued to build model gliders in spite of this initial disaster, and Stan corresponded with pioneer aviators in France, England, and the United States. He later transferred to a higher-paying job driving trucks for Iron Island ironstone quarries. Stan and Norvel once again built their own flying machine while Stan was working on Iron Island. They experimented with this seaplane on nearby Marble Island, notorious for its treacherous waters; Stan lost this aeroplane in the sea.

At 1.88 metres (6 ft 2 in) tall, and weighing 101 kg (223 lb), Dallas would later surprise observers with his ability to fit into the cramped cockpits of fighter planes. Despite his size, he was considered a fine athlete with quick reflexes. Although he could project a loud speaking voice, he was generally soft-spoken and was not known to curse or drink alcohol, nor often to smoke. Dallas stayed fit through regular exercise at the gym, and played rugby union football. He had exceptionally keen eyesight, which he had trained by reading small print in newspapers at the six-foot length of his family's table. To balance out athletics, he participated in amateur theatrics, where his strong voice served him well.

== Service history ==
=== Rise to flying ace ===
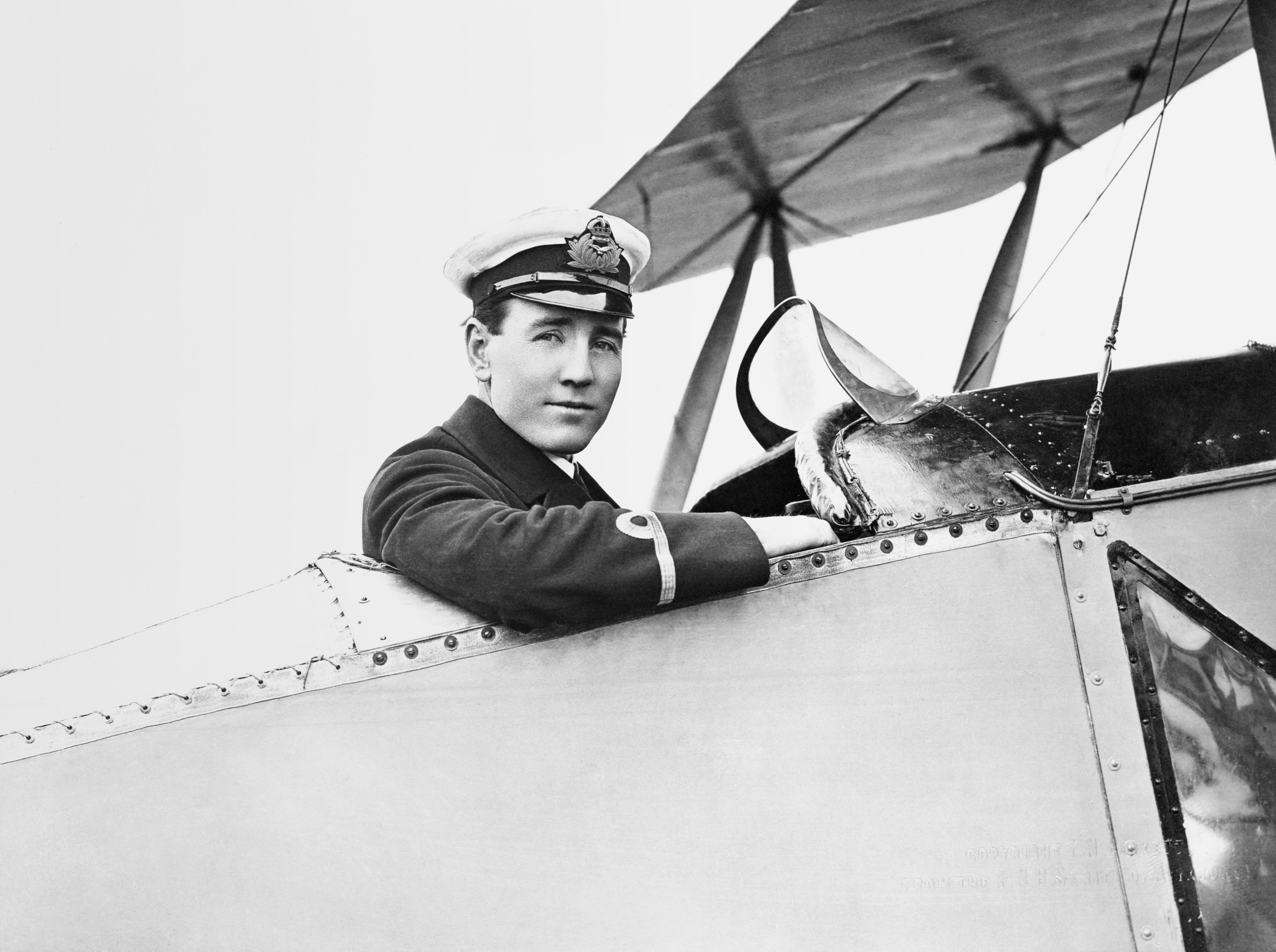
Sub-Lieutenant Dallas, No. 1 Squadron RNAS, c. 1916

Dallas joined the Port Curtis Militia in 1913, and was commissioned as a lieutenant before the outbreak of World War I. Believing he had little chance of gaining a place in the recently established Australian Flying Corps, he applied to join the British Royal Flying Corps (RFC), but was rejected. Undaunted, he travelled from Queensland to Melbourne, where he impressed Minister Without Portfolio J.A. Jensen. Jensen gave the young aspirant a letter of introduction to the Australian High Commissioner in London, Sir George Reid. Dallas paid his own passage to England and, once there, applied once more to the RFC. Rejected again, he turned to the Royal Naval Air Service (RNAS) and was accepted, topping the entrance examination over 83 other students. He was commissioned a flight sub-lieutenant and began training at Hendon in June 1915, gaining Pilot's License #1512 on 5 August.

On 3 December 1915, Dallas joined No. 1 Naval Wing and began flying combat missions in single-seat Nieuport 11 fighters and two-seat Caudrons out of Dunkirk, France. Early in his career there, a practical joker imitating the commanding officer telephoned Dallas, who was the duty officer, and peremptorily ordered him to take off in a propellerless Breguet. Upon learning that he had been tricked, Dallas joined in the laughter. He not only accepted the resulting nickname of "Breguet", but also used it as a signature on his letters home later in the war. Having made two unconfirmed claims in February 1916, Dallas scored his first confirmed victory on 23 April. He outmaneuvered a German Aviatik C and shot it out of control, following his victim down to 2,000 feet, though heavy anti-aircraft fire holed his plane in several places. He went on to score three more confirmed victories with his Nieuport.

On 23 June 1916, Dallas took delivery of the newest RNAS fighter, Sopwith Triplane #N500. This was the original prototype, having undergone Admiralty trials before being shipped to France. Though still only a test plane, it was flown into combat 15 minutes after its arrival. Dallas named it Brown Bread, and it was the first of a series of 'Tripes' that he would fly and fight in over the next year. He achieved his first victory with Brown Bread on 1 July, the same day he was promoted to flight lieutenant. Three days later, he was recommended for further promotion. He scored his last Nieuport-mounted 'kill' on 9 July, earning the Croix de guerre and a mention in despatches for coming to the aid of a French Maurice Farman biplane. On 7 September 1916, Dallas was awarded the Distinguished Service Cross, "for the specially gallant manner in which he has carried out his duties" since first seeing action in December 1915. By the end of the year he was among the earliest RNAS aces, with eight confirmed and four unconfirmed victories, and had been raised to the rank of flight commander.

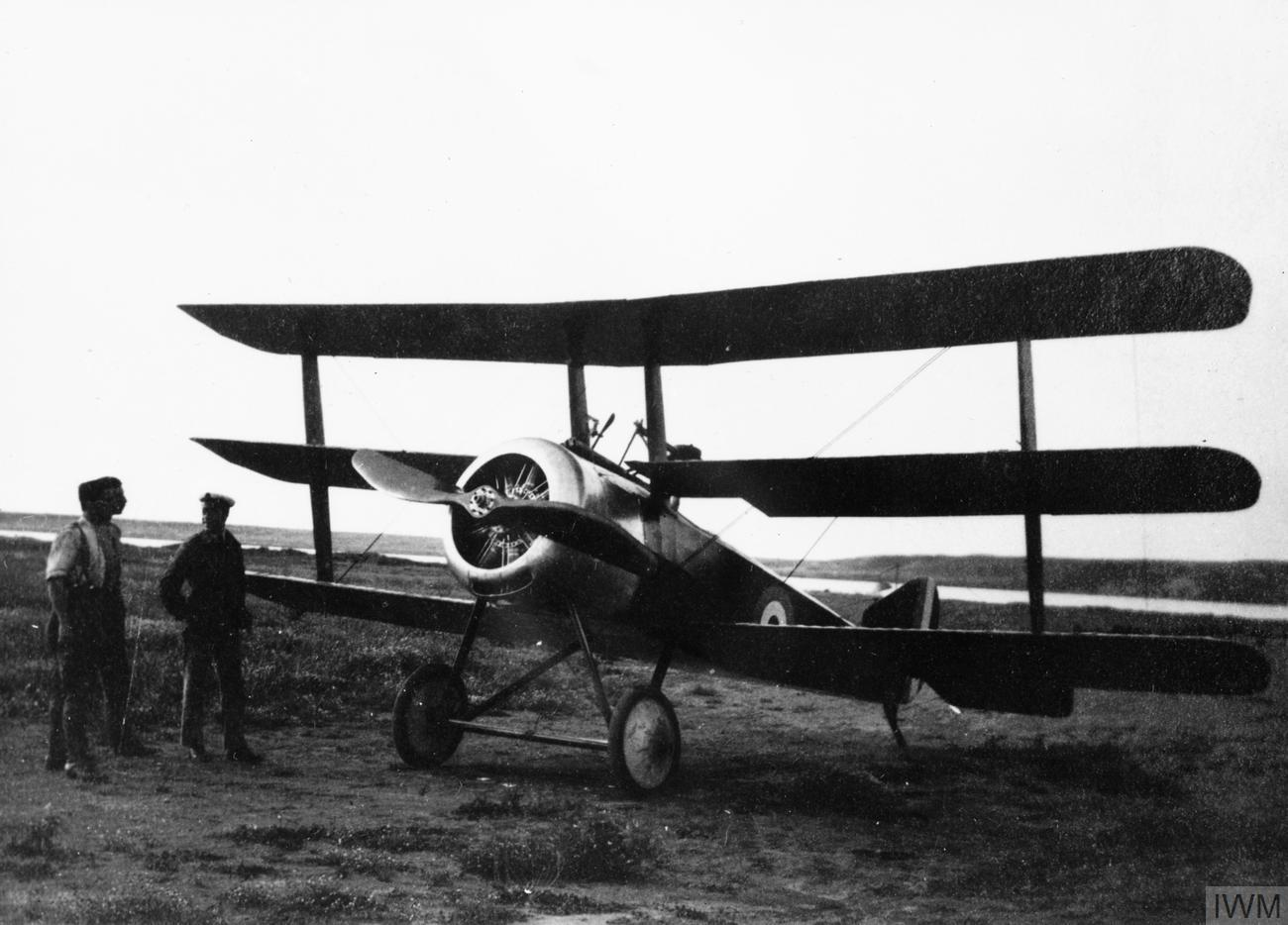
Sopwith Triplane of the RNAS, c. 1917–18

Dallas became one of the best-known pilots of Sopwith Triplanes in the RNAS. He opened 1917 by setting an altitude record of 26,000 feet in the Triplane while testing a prototype oxygen set; he endured frostbite and oxygen intoxication in the process. By now No. 1 Wing's fighter squadron had been renumbered as No. 1 Squadron RNAS, and had totally re-equipped with production Triplanes. It also shifted airfields from Veurne in Belgium to Chipilly in France, leaving behind RNAS control by transferring to No. 14 Wing, 4th Brigade of the RFC. Formation flying became the order of the day, as the practice of fighter pilots soloing into combat dwindled. The last three weeks of March were also filled with Dallas's responsibilities for flight and gunnery testing. As British losses in the air began to mount during Bloody April, Dallas and his squadron moved airfields once again, to La Bellevue. They were thus positioned to take a prominent part in the subsequent Battle of Arras, where the intense aerial fighting saw Dallas add to his burgeoning score.

The combat of 23 April 1917 became known as one of the classic air battles of the war. Dallas and his wingman Thomas Culling took on a squadron-sized formation of 14 German aircraft, having gained an altitude edge over their foes. The naval aces exploited this edge by making quick diving attacks from opposite sides, culminating in short bursts of machine-gun fire. Using the Triplane's superior climbing ability, they would then bob back up to position themselves for the next assault. In contrast to the usual hit-and-run tactics of most dogfights, the RNAS duo launched at least 20 gunnery runs over 45 minutes. The Germans were forced progressively lower, into disarray, and then chased back over their own lines. As well as shooting down three of the Germans, Dallas and Culling achieved a more important outcome by blocking and then breaking up a determined enemy effort against the British ground offensive. The action led to the award of a Bar to the Distinguished Service Cross for Dallas, and a Distinguished Service Cross for Culling, which were gazetted on 29 June.

=== Squadron command ===
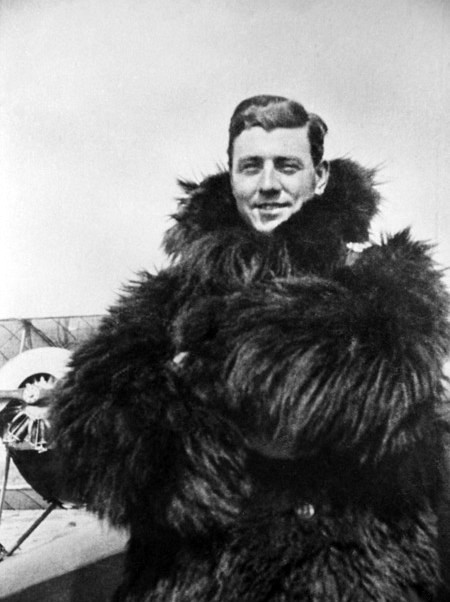
Dallas in a thick fur coat to protect against the severe cold experienced in open cockpits

By June 1917, Dallas had achieved over 20 victories in aerial combat. This experience, and his leadership ability, led to his appointment as commanding officer of No. 1 Naval Squadron on 23 June 1917. The unit had been forced to cut back its operational strength from 18 aircraft to 15 due to lack of pilot replacements and a shortage of spare parts for the ageing Triplanes. It had also moved airfields, to an unprepared site at Bailleul. As a leader, Dallas made a point of shepherding new pilots through their first flights, and even setting them up with their first victories by manoeuvring enemy aircraft into a good position for the rookie to take a shot. On the ground, he proved to be an efficient organiser, designing and directing construction of the new air base. It was also during this time that he wrote a treatise on air combat tactics, extracts of which have survived. Both the air base layout and the treatise displayed his talent as a sketch artist. On 2 November, No. 1 Squadron moved airfields once more, to Middle Aerodrome, which put it back under overall RNAS control. The unit received its first eight new Sopwith Camels on 9 November as replacements for the Triplanes. On 11 November, Dallas was again mentioned in despatches, this time by Field Marshal Haig. After gaining its full complement of Camels, No. 1 Squadron was transferred to England, and took up home defence duties at Dover. On 16 February 1918, Dallas led his squadron back to France, where it was based at Téteghem, supporting units on operations along the Belgian coast. He commanded it for another six weeks, until 31 March.

As part of the amalgamation of the RFC and RNAS to form the Royal Air Force, on 1 April 1918 Dallas was promoted to major and given command of No. 40 Squadron RAF, flying Royal Aircraft Factory S.E.5s. The squadron boasted several aces in its ranks, and its former RFC members were suspicious of Dallas's naval background. He was nevertheless able to overcome their misgivings and established himself as the new CO with his personal demeanour and courage; the nickname of "Admiral" that they bestowed upon him was an affectionate one. Ten days after taking over, he had adapted well enough to his new mount with its inline engine to score his first victory with his new unit. His men also saw that he would not only look out for his rookie pilots, but would not shirk the dangers of ground attack sorties. His offhand attitude toward two leg wounds he received during a strafing mission on 14 April, after which he made "a perfect landing", especially impressed his subordinates, as did his appreciation of all ranks for their hard work. His studious bent continued to serve him; he kept notes on his methods of attacking enemy aircraft, which often exploited their structural weaknesses, and used them to tutor pilots under his command.

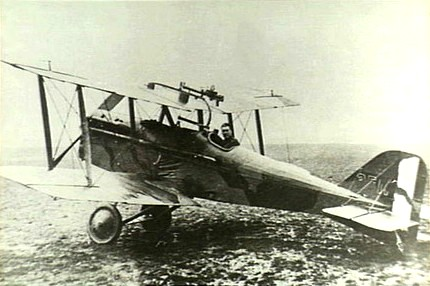
Dallas in his S.E.5, No. 40 Squadron RAF, 1918

Dallas was briefly hospitalised with the wounds to his thigh and heel on 14 April, but sneaked out four days later to rejoin his squadron. His departure may have been spurred by news of the capture of his friend Richard Minifie. As soon as he was able, Dallas was flying again. By 26 April, he had increased his official score to 37, and been awarded the Distinguished Service Order for operations at Dunkirk. He had also several times been recommended for the Victoria Cross, but it was never approved. His casual attitude towards claiming victories was noted by a member of No. 40 Squadron, Cecil Usher, who related that Dallas once remarked of an opponent, "...he went down belching a lot of black smoke and after he had gone down someways one of his planes came off, but I didn't see him crash so I shan't claim him."

On 2 May 1918, during a lull in the fighting at Flanders, Dallas took off in his S.E.5 to taunt his foes. He strafed the German base at La Brayelle to "attract attention" before dropping a package on the aerodrome with a note reading, "If you won't come up here and fight, herewith a pair of boots for work on the ground, pilots for the use of". He then circled in mist until troops came to examine the bundle, whereupon he dropped two bombs and again shot up the base, causing "general panic". News of this singular exploit reportedly provoked laughter from Field Marshal Haig and RAF founder General Sir Hugh Trenchard, two men not known for their sense of humour. While adding to his score and leading his squadron into combat, Dallas had begun thinking beyond the war. He was pleading with his father to quit the dangerous job of mining, with hints that he would support his parents by pioneering aviation in Australia. He also harboured a long-standing ambition of flying from England back to Australia, which would be a record-setting journey.

== Death and legacy ==
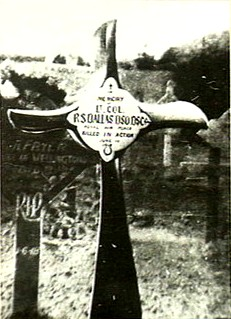
The cross, made from the propeller of an S.E.5, marking Dallas's grave

Dallas was raised to lieutenant colonel and appointed to the command of a wing, but would never see the message from headquarters that arrived on 1 June 1918 advising him of the promotion and ordering him to cease flying. He disappeared on a solo mission the same day. It was later learned that he had been killed over Liévin during combat with three Fokker Triplanes from Jagdstaffel 14, probably by its commander, Leutnant Johannes Werner. There are several theories as to how he died. The common elements are that he was on patrol near the front line when he pounced on a German plane flying at a lower level, that there might have been another unknown British pilot in trouble, and that the Germans who shot Dallas down had dived from a still higher altitude. Medics near his crash site at Absalom Trench ventured into no man's land and retrieved his body, and a patrol of eight volunteers salvaged his personal effects from the fallen aircraft. News of Dallas's death was greeted with shock and disbelief by his squadron, one pilot recording:

The world is upside down ... Dallas has been killed ... Too good for this world I suppose.

The British magazine Aeroplane later paid tribute to him in an editorial:

Roderic Dallas had become almost a legendary character in the RNAS. He was a pilot of quite extraordinary skill, a fighting man of astonishing gallantry, a humorist of a high order, and a black-and-white artist of unusual ability. But, above all this, he was a great leader of men. To be in Dallas' squadron was quite one of the highest honours open to a young fighting pilot of the RNAS and the high reputation held by certain of the RNAS squadrons operating with the RFC during the past year or two has been largely due to the training, example and leadership of Roderic Dallas.

For his record in aerial combat and his leadership skills, Dallas has been compared to the "Red Baron", Manfred von Richthofen. The former flew combat for 29 months, and the latter for 31 months, if his three months in hospital are deducted. Dallas successfully led two different squadrons during his career, and was killed just before assuming command of a wing. Richthofen led first a squadron, then a wing during his 12 months in command, again excluding hospital time; he achieved more victories, but had the tactical advantage of fighting over his own lines with the wind in his favour. Dallas flew a score of different types of Allied aircraft, as well as captured German planes; he was also instrumental in developing the Sopwith Triplane. Richthofen flew the Fokker Dr.1, and helped develop the Fokker D.VII, but did not live to fly it into battle.

Stan Dallas was buried at the Pernes British Cemetery, France, in Lot 38, Row E of Plot II. Along with his military decorations, he was honoured with a Gold Medal by the Aéro-Club de France, and a Bronze Medal and Diploma by the Aero Club of America. The national capital of Canberra remembered him with Dallas Place. His home town of Mount Morgan has dedicated a water reservoir in his honour; its Historical Society Museum holds his medals, uniform, and sword, as well the propeller from one of his planes.

== List of victories ==
Historians have struggled to develop a definitive list of Dallas's victories; Adrian Hellwig, in the bibliography to his 2006 biography, lists over a dozen previous historians that have investigated the subject. He also refers to his difficulties in reconciling previous accounts. Several claim-by-claim analyses ascribe Dallas a score of 32 aircraft shot down, but he was officially credited with 39, and with being second only to Robert Little—who was credited with 47—among Australian aces. Dallas's unofficial tally has been estimated at over 50. This list is a compilation of claim-by-claim analyses that follow, as much as possible, the British system of confirming victory: pilot log entries and/or combat reports did not count, unless verified by squadron or higher levels of command. Thus, inclusion of a confirmed victory in this list has depended on verification by the Squadron Record Book, and/or by RNAS/RAF Communique or other reliable secondary source verification. Victories not confirmed by these methods are marked "u/c".

No.	Date/time	Aircraft	Foe	Result	Location	Notes
u/c	6 February 1916	Nieuport 10 #3968	LVG	Indecisive		Germans dived away after Dallas hit the observer, and possibly the pilot.
1	20 February 1916	Nieuport 11 #3981	C type	Destroyed		Germans fled scene after observer was hit.
2	23 April 1916	Nieuport 11 #3987	Aviatik C	Out of control	Middelkerke	As verified by Naval Communique.
3	11 May 1916	Nieuport 11	Aviatik C	Destroyed		Dallas's solo attack hit both pilot and observer.
4	20 May 1916	Nieuport 11 #3933	Friedrichshafen FF33	Destroyed	Off Blankenberghe	Dallas shot down and sank a seaplane.
5	21 May 1916	Nieuport 11	Albatros C-III	Destroyed	North of Dunkirk	Dallas's solo attack on seven Germans sent one down in smoke.
u/c	22 May 1916			Destroyed		Wing of enemy plane crumpled and it spun.
u/c	11 June 1916	Nieuport	Fokker Eindecker	Destroyed		Dallas supposedly downed an attacking German after his own plane's engine had been hit.
6	1 July 1916	Sopwith Triplane #N500	Unidentified 2-seater (large brown biplane)	Out of control	Off La Panne	Dallas downed German despite gun jam; confirmed by French artillery officer.
7	9 July 1916	Nieuport 11	Fokker E-III	Destroyed	Mariakerke	Pilot killed.
u/c	9 July 1916	Nieuport 11	Large enemy biplane	Inconclusive	Mariakerke	Per Squadron Record Book; Dallas fired into German, who dived erratically away.
8	30 September 1916	Sopwith Triplane #N500	Unidentified scout	Out of control	Southwest of St Pierre Capelle	Verified by Squadron Record Book.
9	21 October 1916	Sopwith Triplane #N500	LVG 2-seater	Destroyed	Vicinity of Pervaise	Verified by Squadron Record Book.
u/c	27 January 1917	Sopwith Triplane #N5436	2-seater	Enemy aircraft departed in steep dive.	Near Dixmude	Royal Naval Air Service Summary: "not verified".
10	1 February 1917	Sopwith Triplane #N5436	LVG C-type	Destroyed	North of Dixmude	Verified by Squadron Record Book.
11	5 April 1917	Sopwith Triplane #N5436	Albatros D-II	Out of control	East-Southeast of St. Quentin	Combat Report verified by Squadron Record Book.
12	6 April 1917	Sopwith Triplane #5436	Albatros fighter	Out of control		Thomas Culling scored in same fight, and had victory recorded on this date.
13	8 April 1917	Sopwith Triplane #N5436	Albatros C-type	Out of control	E of Cambrai	Per Squadron Record Book, Combat Report counter-signed by witness and squadron commander.
2 u/c	16 April 1917 and 19 April 1917	Sopwith Triplane #N5436				These victories are only in Dallas's logbook. They immediately followed his squadron's change of home airfields.
14	21 April 1917	Sopwith Triplane #N5436	Albatros Scout	Out of control		Per Squadron Record Book. This victory is sometimes mistakenly dated 22 April 1917.
15 and 16	22 April 1917	Sopwith Triplane #N5436	Two Albatros D-IIIs	Destroyed; set on fire and destroyed	Arleux	Dallas and wingman Thomas Culling constantly attacked 14 German airplanes for 45 minutes, per Squadron Record Book and Royal Flying Corps Communique #85.
17	23 April 1917	Sopwith Triplane #N5436	Albatros C-type	Destroyed	Near Douai	Per Dallas's Official Service Record and Squadron Record Book.
18	23 April 1917	Sopwith Triplane #N5436	Unidentified two-seater	Set afire and destroyed	Near Douai	Per Dallas's Official Service Record and Squadron Record Book.
19	24 April 1917	Sopwith Triplane #N5436	Albatros D.III	Out of control	SE of Lens	Per Squadron Record Book and Combat Report; pilot hit.
20 and 21	30 April 1917	Sopwith Triplane #N5436	Rumpler C-type; "German Nieuport"	Destroyed; out of control	Near Haynecourt	Per Squadron Record Book.
22	5 May 1917	Sopwith Triplane #N5436	Albatros D-III	Out of control	4 miles E of Lens	Per Squadron Record Book.
23	6 May 1917	Sopwith Triplane	Albatros D-III	Out of control		Confirmed by Dallas's Official Service Record.
24	9 May 1917	Sopwith Triplane	Two-seater	Out of control	Near Vitry	Confirmed by Dallas's Official Service Record; German observer killed.
25	19 May 1917	Sopwith Triplane	Albatros D-III	Out of control	Henin-Lietard	Victory witnessed by Flight Sub-Lieutenant Cyril Ridley.
u/c	16 June 1917	Sopwith Triplane	Aviatik			Dallas's first possible victory as squadron commander.
3 u/c	22 June 1917; one in AM and two in PM	Sopwith Triplane	AEG; AEG; Halberstadt		Douai?	Dallas's second, third, and fourth possible victories as squadron commander.
26	22 July 1917	Sopwith Triplane	Albatros C	Out of control	Lille	Confirmed by Royal Flying Corps Communique #98.
27	12 August 1917	Sopwith Triplane N6508	Albatros	Destroyed	E of Wervicq	Royal Flying Corps Communique #101.
28	16 August 1917	Sopwith Triplane	Albatros D.V	Destroyed	N of Gheluwe	Royal Flying Corps Communique #101.
29	16 September 1917	Sopwith Triplane		Destroyed		Reputedly in company with Captain Robert Little
30	15 November 1917	Sopwith Camel #B6427	DFW C-type	Destroyed	Ruggevelde	Per Royal Naval Air Service communique. Scored while on home defence duties.
31	6 December 1917	Sopwith Camel #B6431	DFW C-type	Out of control	Ostend	Scored while on home defence duties.
32	11 March 1918	Sopwith Camel	Aviatik? 2-seater	Destroyed	Near Dixmude	Per Royal Naval Air Service Communique.
33	11 March 1918	Sopwith Camel	Rumpler C	Destroyed	Near Dixmude	Per Royal Naval Air Service Communique.
34	12 March 1918	Sopwith Camel #5427	Kite balloon	Destroyed—set aflame		Only confirmed balloon victory, though he drove balloons down on several occasions.
35	19 March 1918		2-seater	Destroyed		Per Dallas's Official Service Record.
36	11 April 1918	RAF S.E.5a #C4879	DFW C-type	Destroyed	La Bassee	Per Squadron Record Book.
37	12 April 1918	RAF SE5a #B178	Albatros	Destroyed	S of Estaires	German Albatros was circling downed wingman when shot down.
38	2 May 1918	RAF SE5a #D3511	Albatros D.V	Destroyed	Brebieres	Per Squadron Record Book.
39	8 May 1918	RAF SE5a #D3511	Albatros D.V	Out of control	Brebieres	Victory witnessed by Lieutenant Rusden.
40	15 May 1918	RAF SE5a #D3511	Albatros C-type	Out of control	E of La Bassee	Per Squadron Record Book.
41	18 May 1918	RAF SE5a #D3511	Rumpler C-type	Destroyed	Lille	Per Squadron Record Book; this was reportedly an artillery spotter calling in fire on Dallas's airfield.
42	20 May 1918	RAF SE5a #D3511	Pfalz	Out of control	Merville	Per Squadron Record Book, despite Combat Report stating "...no pilot is prepared to take credit..."
43	22 May 1918	RAF SE5a #D3511	Pfalz	Out of control	W of Lille	Dallas's solo attack picked off last plane in formation.
3 u/c	23 May 1918	RAF SE5a	Fokker Dr.I; Fokker Dr.1; Rumpler 2-seater			Dallas's squadron was changing home airfields at this time.
44	27 May 1918	RAF SE5a	Pfalz Scout	Destroyed	Hantay	Per Combat Report.
45	30 May 1918	RAF SE5a #D3511	DFW 2-seater	Destroyed	Estaires	Per Squadron Record Book.
