= Fabian Ehmann (politician) =

German politician (born 1993)

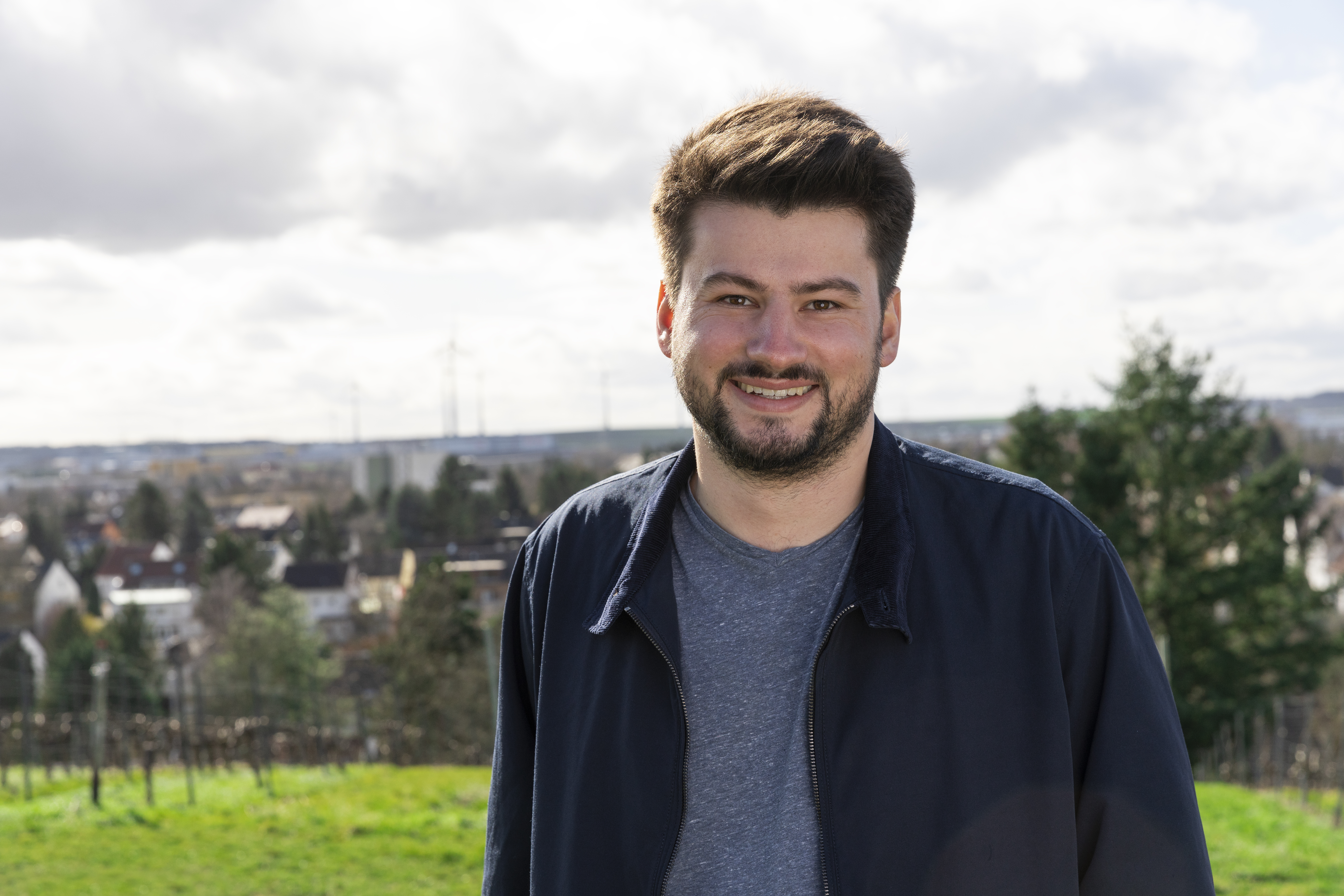
- Ehmann in 2020

Member of the Landtag of Rhineland-Palatinate
- Incumbent
- Assumed office 18 May 2021

Personal details
- Born: 29 March 1993 (age 32)
- Party: Alliance 90/The Greens (since 2014)

Fabian Ehmann (born 29 March 1993) is a German politician serving as a member of the Landtag of Rhineland-Palatinate since 2021. From 2014 to 2015, he served as managing director of the Green Youth in Rhineland-Palatinate.
