= Robert A. Little =

Australian fighter ace

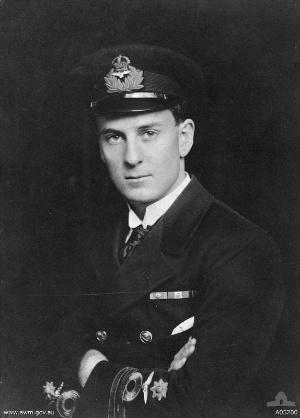
- Studio portrait of Robert A. Little
- Born: 19 July 1895; Hawthorn, Victoria, Australia
- Died: 27 May 1918 (aged 22); Nœux, France
- Military career
- Allegiance: United Kingdom
- Branch: Royal Naval Air Service; Royal Air Force
- Service years: 1916–18
- Rank: Captain
- Nickname: "Rikki"
- Units: No. 8 Squadron RNAS (1916–17); No. 203 Squadron RAF (1918)
- Conflicts: World War I; Western Front
- Awards: Distinguished Service Order & Bar; Distinguished Service Cross & Bar; Mentioned in Despatches; Croix de guerre (France)

Robert Alexander Little, DSO & Bar, DSC & Bar (19 July 1895 – 27 May 1918), a World War I fighter pilot, is generally regarded as the most successful Australian flying ace, with an official tally of forty-seven victories. Born in Victoria, he travelled to England in 1915 and learned to fly at his own expense before joining the Royal Naval Air Service (RNAS). Posted to the Western Front in June 1916, he flew Sopwith Pups, Triplanes and Camels with No. 8 Squadron RNAS, achieving thirty-eight victories within a year and earning the Distinguished Service Order and Bar, the Distinguished Service Cross and Bar, and the French Croix de guerre. Rested in July 1917, he volunteered to return to the front in March 1918 and scored a further nine victories with No. 3 Squadron RNAS (later No. 203 Squadron RAF) before he was killed in action on the night of 27 May, aged twenty-two.

== Early life ==
Little was born on 19 July 1895 at Hawthorn, a suburb of Melbourne, to Canadian James Little, a seller of medical and surgical books, and his Victorian-born wife Susan. His family heritage was Scottish, and he was educated at Camberwell Grammar School and Scotch College, Melbourne, where he was a swimming medallist. He entered his father's business as a travelling salesman, and was living with his family at Windsor when World War I broke out in August 1914.

== World War I ==
Long interested in aviation, Little decided to apply for pilot training at the Australian Army's Central Flying School in Point Cook, but with only four vacancies, he was rejected along with hundreds of others. He then decided to sail for England in July 1915 and become a qualified pilot at his own expense. Gaining his flying certificate with the Royal Aero Club at Hendon in October, he joined the Royal Naval Air Service (RNAS) as a probationary flight sub-lieutenant on 14 January 1916. He suffered badly from air sickness early on, most likely brought on by fumes from castor oil that was employed as an engine lubricant in the aircraft he flew in England.

Little arrived in France in June 1916 for service with No. 1 (Naval) Wing at Dunkirk, where he initially flew Sopwith 1½ Strutters in bombing raids. He married Vera Gertrude Field at the Congregational Church, Dover, on 16 September. The next month he was posted to No. 8 Squadron RNAS ("Naval Eight") flying Sopwith Pups on the Western Front, under fellow Australian Stanley Goble. Little scored his first aerial victory on 23 November, destroying an enemy two-seater north-east of La Bassée. By the following February, he had four victories to his credit and was awarded the Distinguished Service Cross (DSC) for "conspicuous bravery in successfully attacking and bringing down hostile machines". In one action on 4 December, Little and Goble "fought like mad" against a large formation of German fighters, each claiming a Halberstadt; Little did not return to base with Goble and was thought lost, but had only landed near Allied lines to clear his jammed gun before taking off again to continue the fight.

On 24 April 1917, Little engaged a DFW C.V, forcing it to land. He then followed the German aircraft down to claim it as captured and personally take its crew prisoner at gunpoint. The Australian flipped his own plane in a ditch after touching down, prompting the surrendering enemy pilot to suggest: "It looks as if I have brought you down, not you me, doesn't it?" Naval Eight's conversion to the Sopwith Triplane in April saw Little begin to score heavily, eventually registering twenty-four victories in the type to bring his total to twenty-eight by 10 July, including twin victories in a day on four occasions. He was the squadron's top scorer with the Triplane, mostly in one airframe, N5493, that he christened "Blymp" and which also became the nickname of his baby son. The unit then began flying Sopwith Camels, in which he scored a further ten kills in July to make fourteen for the month. When he subsequently rotated back to England for rest, he was ranked flight lieutenant and credited with a total of thirty-eight victories, including fifteen destroyed or captured. A bar to his DSC had been gazetted on 29 June, for "exceptional daring and skill in aerial fighting on many occasions", and he received the French Croix de guerre on 11 July, becoming—along with fellow Australian RNAS ace Roderic (Stan) Dallas—one of the first three British Empire pilots to be so decorated. In August, he was awarded the Distinguished Service Order "for exceptional skill and daring", followed by a bar to the decoration in September for "remarkable courage and boldness in attacking enemy machines". He was mentioned in despatches on 11 December, and promoted to flight commander the following month.

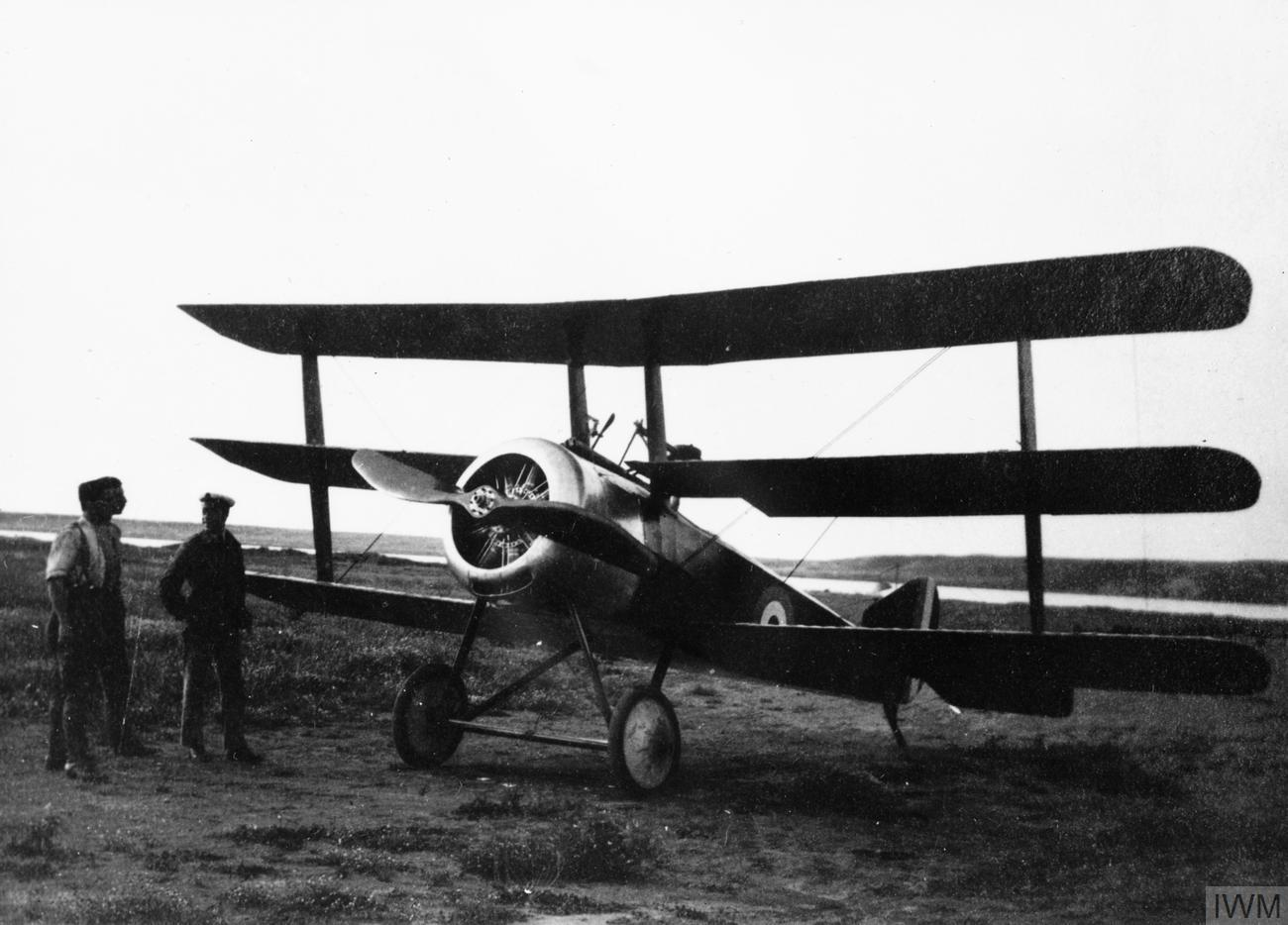
Sopwith Triplane of the RNAS, c. 1917–18

Despite Little's prowess in combat, as an aviator he was ordinary at best, making several crash-landings. What gave him his edge as a fighter pilot was his keen eye, excellent marksmanship, and willingness to single-handedly take on entire enemy formations and close in on his prey—down to twenty-five yards on occasion—before opening fire. Fellow No. 8 Squadron member Reggie Soar recalled, "Although not a polished pilot, he was one of the most aggressive ... an outstanding shot with both revolver and rifle ..."; ace Robert Comptson described Little as "not so much a leader as a brilliant lone hand ... Small in stature, with face set grimly, he seemed the epitome of deadliness". His squadron nicknamed him "Rikki", after the mongoose "Rikki-Tikki-Tavi", which outstrikes cobras in the story of the same name by Rudyard Kipling. Soar noted that as well as being skilful with guns, Little was "also a collector of wild flowers". His wife contended that his appearance in photographs belied his sense of humour. Squadron commander Raymond Collishaw, who would finish the war as the RNAS' top-scoring ace, summed up Little as "an outstanding character, bold, aggressive and courageous, yet he was gentle and kindly. A resolute and brave man."

Following a period of rest in England, Little turned down a desk assignment and volunteered to return to action on the Western Front, joining Lieutenant Colonel Collishaw's No. 3 Squadron RNAS in March 1918. The unit evolved into No. 203 Squadron of the new Royal Air Force on 1 April, formed after the merger of the RNAS and the Royal Flying Corps. Now ranked captain, and again flying Sopwith Camels, Little gained a further nine successes, beginning with a Fokker Triplane on 1 April, and concluding with two kills in one day on 22 May, an Albatros and a DFW. During this stretch of victories, on 21 April 1918, he was brought down unharmed by Friedrich Ehmann.

On 27 May, Little received reports of German Gotha bombers in the vicinity, and took off on a moonlit evening to intercept the raiders. As he closed with one of the bombers, his plane was caught in a searchlight beam and he was struck by a bullet that passed through both his thighs. He crash-landed in a field near Nœux, and bled to death before he was discovered the following morning by a passing gendarme. Little's skull and ankle had also been fractured in the impact; his body was identified by his friend and fellow ace, Charles Dawson Booker. Collishaw launched an investigation but it was never established whether the single bullet that hit Little had come from a gunner in the Gotha or from the ground.

== Legacy ==
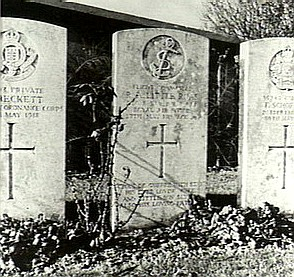
Little's grave in Wavans Cemetery, France

Little was buried in the village cemetery at Nœux, before his body was moved to Wavans British Cemetery in the Pas de Calais. Aged twenty-two, he left a widow and a son; in accordance with her husband's wishes, Vera travelled back to Australia to raise the boy. Of Little's forty-seven confirmed victories, twenty were credited as destroyed, two as captured, and twenty-five as "out of control"; he was believed to be responsible for many others driven down or forced to land, which were not counted in his official total. As well as the eighth most successful Commonwealth ace of World War I, and the ranking RNAS ace, this score made him the most prolific Australian ace of all time, ahead of Stan Dallas with an official score of thirty-nine, although modern research also credits Dallas with a tally numbering in the fifties.

The propeller blade from Little's Sopwith Triplane was fitted with a clock in its hub by his fellow officers, who presented it to his widow; she transported it back to Australia in three pieces and it later went on display at the Australian War Memorial, along with his awards and the wooden cross of his original burial place at Nœux. The Sopwith Pup he flew with No. 8 Squadron RNAS, N5182, was rebuilt to flying standard and in October 1976 led a flypast to commemorate the squadron's Diamond Jubilee, before going on permanent display at the Royal Air Force Museum, Hendon. One of the buildings of the Australian Defence Force Academy (ADFA) in Canberra, opened in 1986, was named in Little's honour.
