= No. 201 Squadron RAF =

Flying squadron of the Royal Air Force

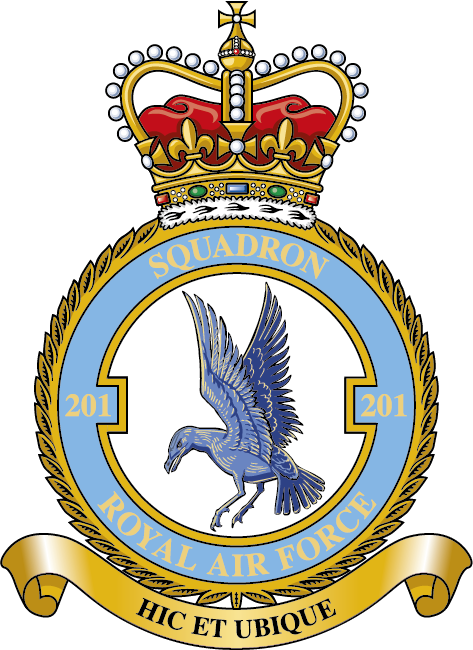
- Official Squadron badge of No. 201 Squadron RAF
- Active: 17 October 1914 – 21 June 1915 (RNAS); 6 December 1916 – 1 April 1918 (RNAS); 1 April 1918 – 31 December 1919 (RAF); 1 January 1929 – 28 February 1957; 1 October 1958 – 26 May 2011; 7 August 2021 – present
- Country: United Kingdom
- Branch: Royal Air Force
- Type: Flying squadron
- Role: Anti-submarine warfare, anti-surface warfare and maritime patrol aircraft
- Part of: No. 1 Group
- Home station: RAF Lossiemouth
- Nickname: Guernsey's Own Squadron
- Mottos: Latin: Hic et ubique ("Here and everywhere")

Commanders
- Notable commanders: Roderic Dallas; Robert Marsland Groves

Insignia
- Squadron Badge heraldry: A seagull, wings elevated and addorsed
- Squadron codes: VQ (Apr 1939 – Sep 1939); ZM (Sep 1939 – Aug 1943); 1 (Nov 1943 – Mar 1944); NS (Jul 1944 – Apr 1951); A (Apr 1951 – Feb 1957)

Number 201 Squadron is a squadron of the Royal Air Force. It currently operates the Boeing Poseidon MRA1 from RAF Lossiemouth, Moray.

It is the only squadron affiliated with Guernsey, in the Channel Islands. This affiliation started in 1935 and is commemorated in the museum on Castle Cornet. Its history goes even further back than the RAF itself, being formed originally as No. 1 Squadron RNAS on 17 October 1914. It had previously operated the Hawker Siddeley Nimrod MR2, based at RAF Kinloss, Moray, between January 1982 and March 2010.

== History ==
=== Formation and World War I ===
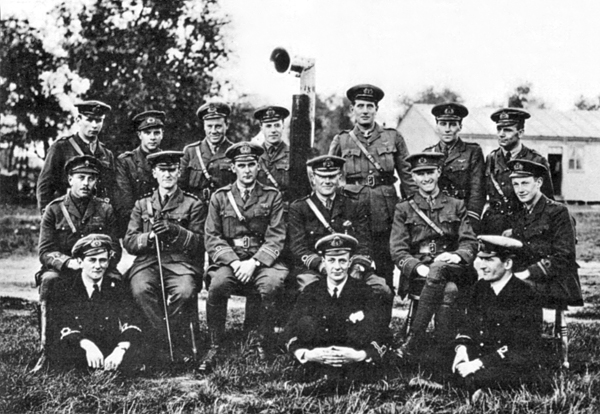
Personnel of No 1 Squadron RNAS in late 1914

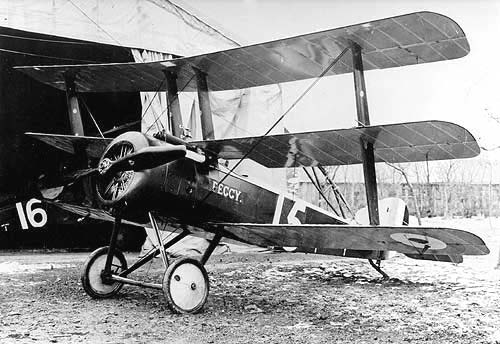
Sopwith Triplane (serial N5387) of No. 1 Naval Squadron

Despite its high squadron number, 201 Squadron is one of the oldest squadrons in the RAF. It was formed as No. 1 Squadron of the Royal Naval Air Service (RNAS) on 17 October 1914, and reformed under that designation on 6 December 1916, only being renumbered to 201 Squadron on the formation of the RAF on 1 April 1918 – all the RNAS squadrons getting new numbers by adding 200 to their original number.

A Victoria Cross was won by a member of No. 1 Squadron RNAS when on 7 June 1915 Sub-Lieutenant R.A.J. Warneford shot down Zeppelin LZ.37.

After the war the squadron was disbanded at RAF Eastleigh on 31 December 1919. Eighteen flying aces served in the squadron during the course of the war, including such notables as Samuel Kinkead, Stanley Wallace Rosevear, Richard Minifie, Roderic Dallas, George Gates, Reginald Brading, Maxwell Findlay, Cyril Ridley, Thomas Gerrard, John Jones, James Henry Forman, Charles Dawson Booker, Thomas Culling, future Air Vice-Marshal F. H. Maynard, Robert McLaughlin, and Hazel Wallace.

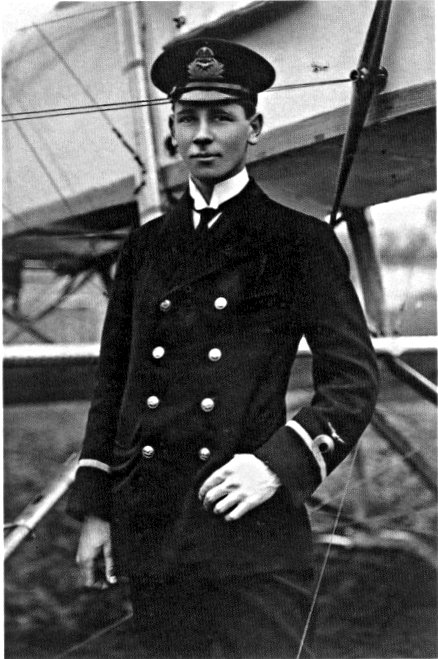
R.A.J. Warneford, V.C. standing in front of a Maurice Farman Shorthorn.

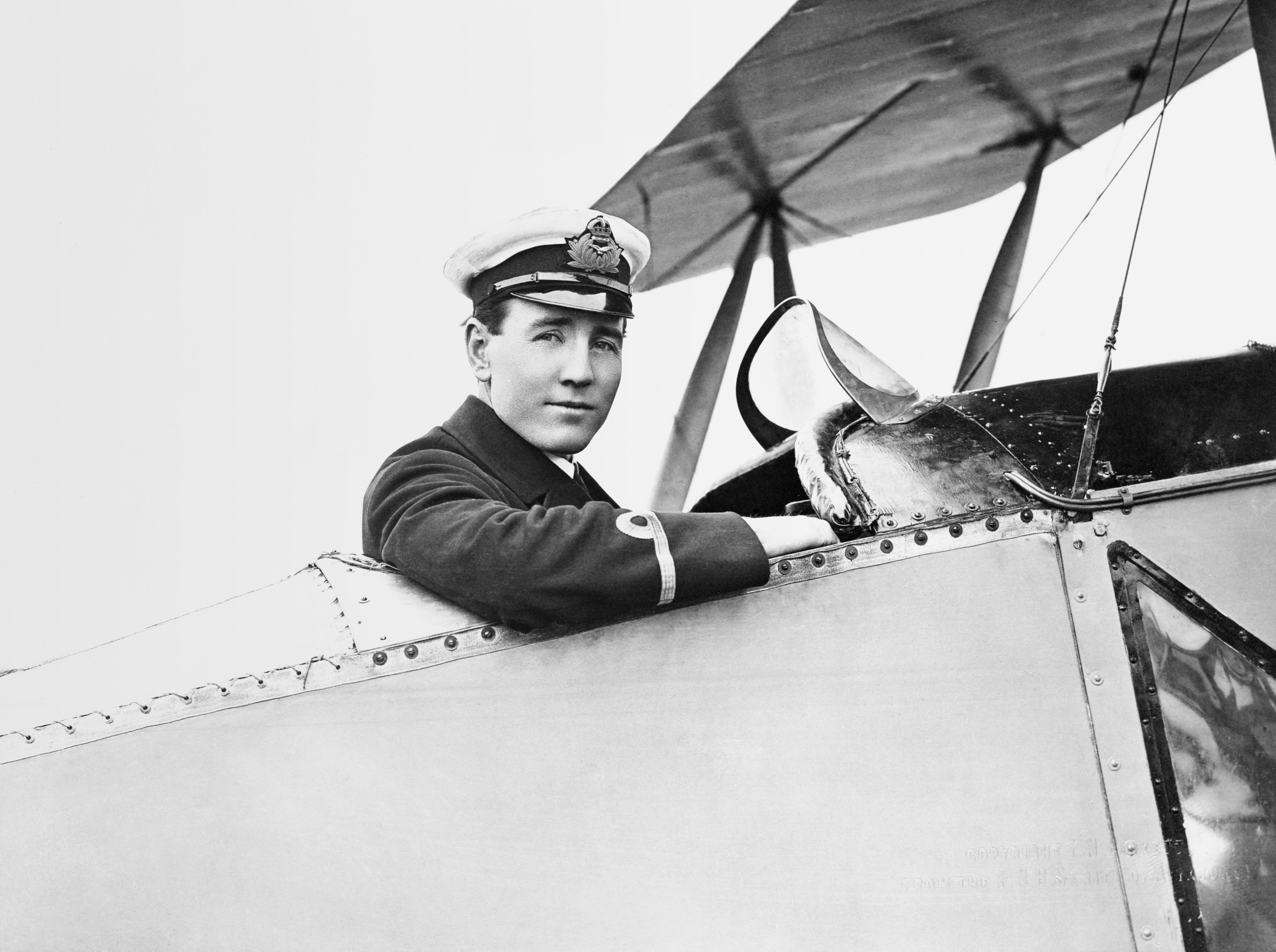
Sub-Lieutenant Dallas, No. 1 Squadron RNAS, c. 1916

=== Flying boat squadron ===
The squadron was reformed at RAF Calshot on 1 January 1929 by expanding no. 480 Flight, a Supermarine Southampton flying boat unit. In April 1936 the Southamptons gave way to the Saro London, which the squadron still had on strength when World War II broke out. Supermarine Stranraers flew shortly with the squadron in 1939, but by April 1940 the squadron was operational on the Short Sunderland, which would remain the squadron equipment for almost seventeen years up till 28 February 1957, when the squadron was disbanded at RAF Pembroke Dock.

=== Shackletons and Nimrods ===
The squadron was reformed at RAF St. Mawgan, when No. 220 Squadron RAF was renumbered to 201 Squadron. The squadron flew the next twelve years with the Avro Shackleton MR.3, a version that used a tricycle undercarriage as opposed to the earlier tailwheel variants. Following the Shackleton's retirement, the squadron converted to Nimrods in October 1970.

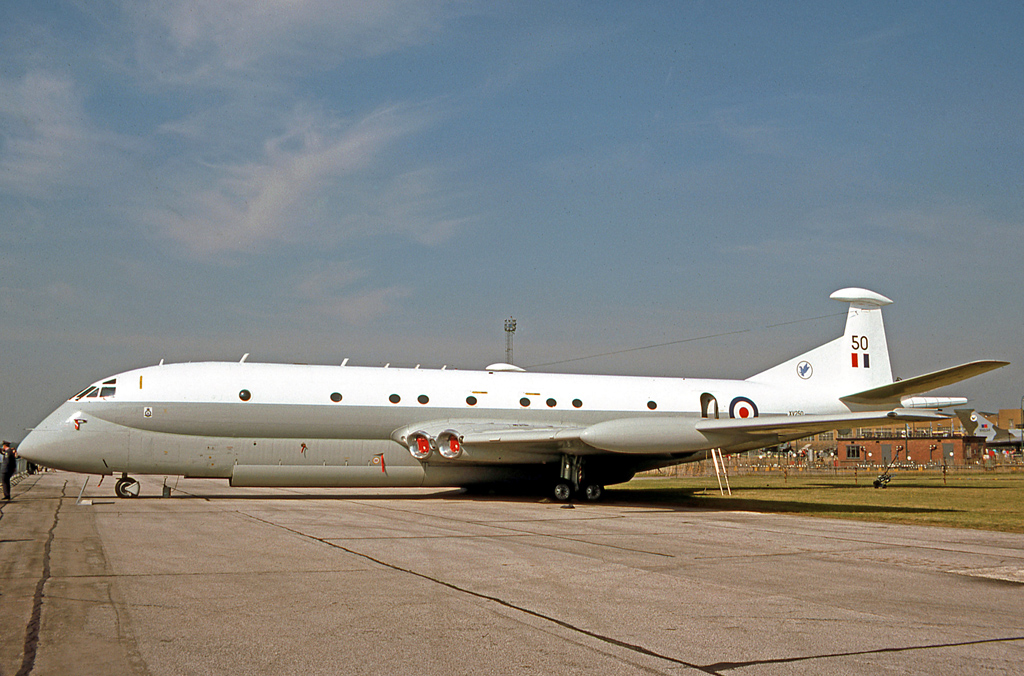
Nimrod MR.1 of 201 Squadron exhibited at the Queen's Silver Jubilee Review at RAF Finningley in July 1977.

The squadron was active for over a decade in the Gulf region, in support of both Gulf War 1 and 2 and more recently the conflict in Afghanistan. Until March 2010, the squadron was also on active duty in the UK and maintained continuous 24-hour/365-day search and rescue standby, shared with the sister 120 Squadron, both flying from RAF Kinloss. The Nimrod MR2 was withdrawn in March 2010, and the squadron was formally disbanded on 26 May 2011. It had been preparing to operate the Nimrod MRA4 but this aircraft was cancelled under the 2010 Strategic Defence and Security Review.

=== Reformation ===
In July 2017, it was announced that No. 201 Squadron would be one of two RAF squadrons to fly the P-8A Poseidon, based at RAF Lossiemouth. It was later confirmed the squadron would stand up in the 'Summer of 2021' operating in the role and at location as previously stated. No. 201 Squadron reformed on 7 August 2021, reclaiming their Squadron Standard from Government House in Guernsey on 22 October.

== Notable squadron members ==
- Roderic Dallas (Royal Naval Air Service)
- Patrick Dunn (Royal Air Force)
- Richard Minifie (Royal Naval Air Service)
- John Harris (Royal Air Force), Officer Commanding 1973–75
- Reginald Alexander John Warneford (Royal Naval Air Service)

== Aircraft operated ==
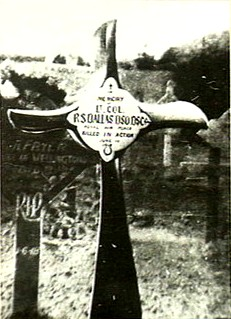
The cross, made from the propeller of an S.E.5, marking Lt Col. R. Dallas's grave

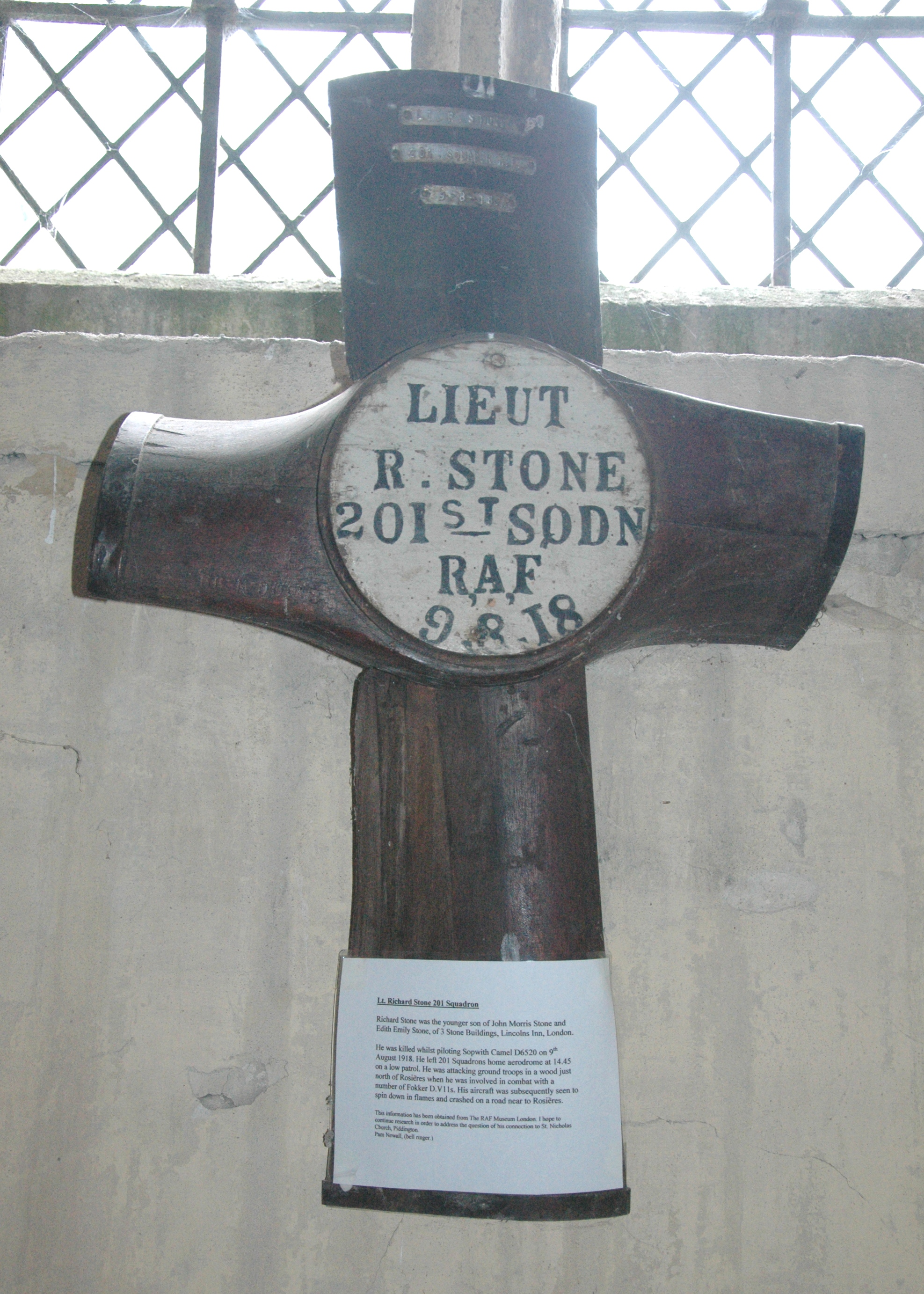
Monument made from an aircraft propeller in St Nicholas' parish church, Piddington, Oxfordshire, to Lt. Richard Stone, a 201 Squadron Sopwith Camel pilot killed in action in France on 9 August 1918

The squadron has operated the following aircraft types.

- Various (Oct 1914 – Feby 1915)
- Nieuport 17 (Dec 1916 – Jan 1917)
- Sopwith Triplane (Dec 1916 – Dec 1917)
- Sopwith Camel (Dec 1917 – Feb 1919)
- Sopwith Snipe (Oct 1918 – Oct 1918)
- Supermarine Southampton Mk.II (Jan 1929 – Dec 1936)
- Saro London Mk.I (Apr 1936 – Jun 1938)
- Saro London Mk.II (Jan 1938 – 1938)
- Short Sunderland Mk.I (Apr 1940 – Jan 1942)
- Short Sunderland Mk.II (May 1941 – Mar 1944)
- Short Sunderland Mk.III (Jan 1942 – Jun 1945)
- Short Sunderland Mk.V (Feb 1945 – Feb 1957)
- Short Seaford Mk.I (Mar 1946 – Apr 1946)
- Avro Shackleton MR.3 (Oct 1958 – Dec 1970)
- Hawker-Siddeley Nimrod MR.1 (Oct 1970 – Feb 1983)
- BAe Nimrod MR2 (Jan 1982 – Mar 2010)
- Boeing Poseidon MRA1 (Aug 2021 – present)

== Squadron bases ==
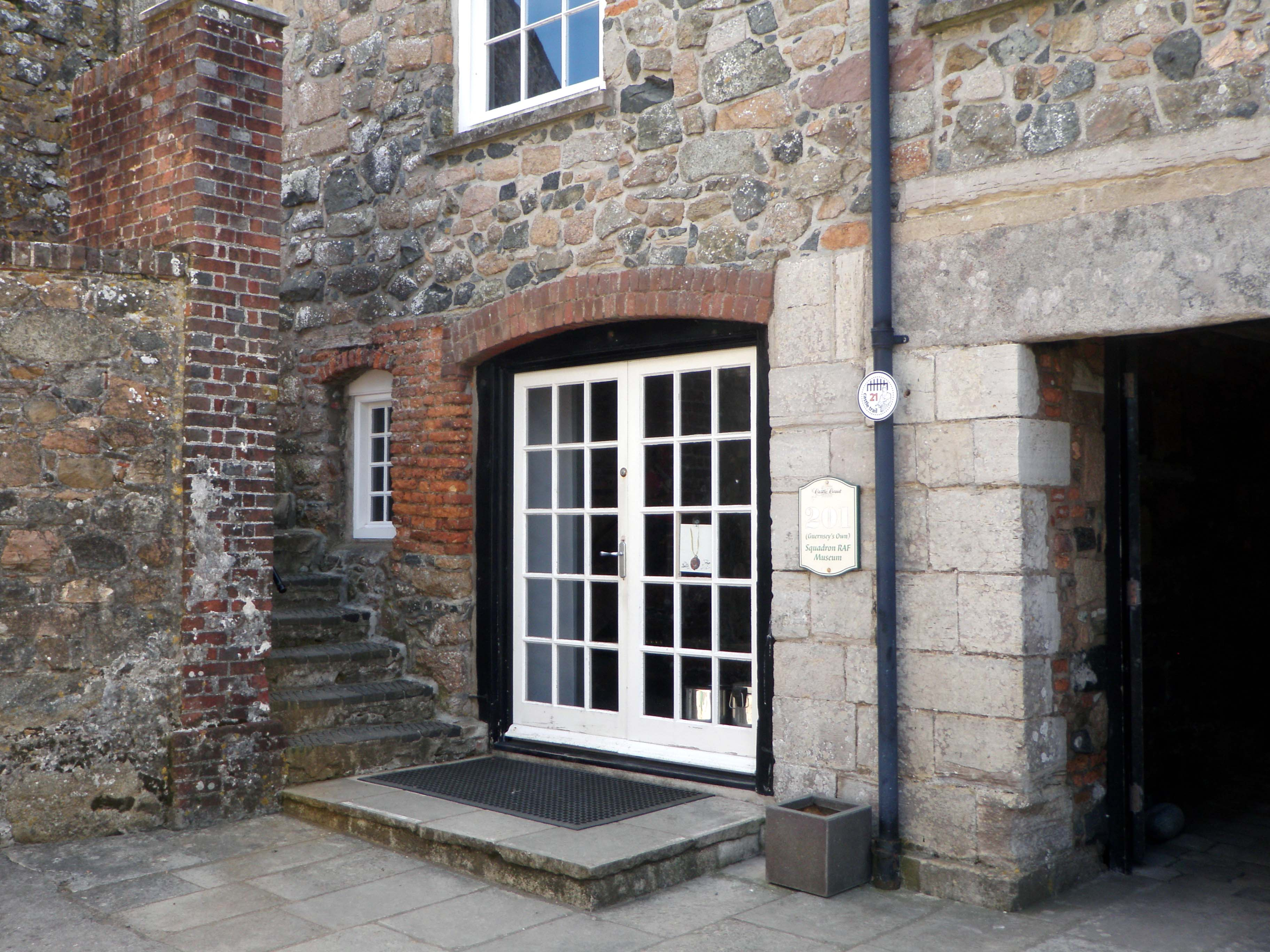
Entrance to the No. 201 Squadron RAF museum at Castle Cornet, Saint Peter Port, Guernsey

From	To	Base
6 Dec 1916	15 Feb 1917	Furnes, Belgium
15 Feb 1917	11 Apr 1917	Chipilly, France
11 Apr 1917	1 Jun 1917	La Belle-vue, France
1 Jun 1917	2 Nov 1917	Bailleul, France
2 Nov 1917	10 Dec 1917	Middle Aerodrome
10 Dec 1917	16 Feb 1918	Dover, Kent
16 Feb 1918	27 Mar 1918	Téteghem, France
27 Mar 1918	28 Mar 1918	Sainte-Marie-Cappel, France
28 Mar 1918	12 Apr 1918	Fienvillers, France
12 Apr 1918	20 Jul 1918	Nœux-lès-Auxi, France
20 Jul 1918	6 Aug 1918	Sainte-Marie-Cappel, France
6 Aug 1918	14 Aug 1918	Poulainville, France
14 Aug 1918	19 Sep 1918	Nœux-lès-Auxi, France
19 Sep 1918	14 Oct 1918	Baizieux, France
14 Oct 1918	27 Oct 1918	Beugnâtre, France
27 Oct 1918	22 Nov 1918	La Targette, France
22 Nov 1918	5 Feb 1919	Béthencourt, France
15 Feb 1919	2 Sep 1919	RAF Lake Down, Wiltshire
2 Sep 1919	31 Dec 1919	RAF Eastleigh, Hampshire
1 Jan 1929	29 Sep 1938	RAF Calshot, Hampshire
29 Sep 1938	7 Oct 1938	RAF Invergordon, Ross and Cromarty, Scotland
7 Oct 1938	9 Aug 1939	RAF Calshot, Hampshire
9 Aug 1939	6 Nov 1939	RAF Sullom Voe, Shetland, Scotland
6 Nov 1939	26 May 1940	RAF Invergordon, Ross and Cromarty, Scotland
26 May 1940	9 Oct 1941	RAF Sullom Voe, Shetland, Scotland
9 Oct 1941	8 Apr 1944	Lough Erne, County Fermanagh, Northern Ireland
8 Apr 1944	3 Nov 1944	RAF Pembroke Dock, Pembrokeshire, Wales
3 Nov 1944	2 Aug 1945	RAF Castle Archdale, County Fermanagh, Northern Ireland
2 Aug 1945	1 Apr 1946	RAF Pembroke Dock, Pembrokeshire, Wales
1 Apr 1946	18 Jan 1949	RAF Calshot, Hampshire (Det. at Finkenwerder, West-Germany)
18 Jan 1949	28 Feb 1957	RAF Pembroke Dock, Pembrokeshire, Wales
1 Oct 1958	1 Jul 1965	RAF St Mawgan, Cornwall
1 Jul 1965	26 May 2011	RAF Kinloss, Moray, Scotland
7 Aug 2021	present	RAF Lossiemouth, Moray, Scotland

== Battle honours ==
No. 201 Squadron has received the following battle honours. Those marked with an asterisk (*) may be emblazoned on the squadron standard.

- Western Front (1915–1918)*
- Arras*
- Ypres (1917)*
- Somme (1918)*
- Amiens
- Hindenburg Line
- Channel & North Sea (1939–1945)
- Norway (1940)*
- Atlantic (1941–1945)*
- Bismarck*
- Biscay (1941–1945)
- Normandy (1944)*
- South Atlantic (1982)
- Gulf (1991)
- Iraq (2003)
- Afghanistan (2001–2014)

== See also ==
- List of Royal Air Force aircraft squadrons
- Armed forces in Scotland
- Military history of Scotland
