= James Henry Forman =

Canadian flying ace

- Born: 1 February 1896; Kirkfield, Ontario, Canada
- Died: 4 October 1972 (aged 76); Santa Barbara, California, USA
- Military career
- Allegiance: Canada; United Kingdom
- Branch: Canadian Expeditionary Force; Royal Flying Corps; Royal Naval Air Service
- Rank: Captain
- Units: No. 6 Naval Squadron RNAS; No. 1 Naval Squadron RNAS/No. 201 Squadron RAF; No. 70 Squadron RAF
- Conflicts: World War I World War II
- Awards: Distinguished Flying Cross

Captain James Henry Forman DFC (1 February 1896 - 4 October 1972) was a World War I Canadian flying ace credited with nine aerial victories. He was personally decorated by his king for his valor. After leaving military service in the 1920s, he would return to service in World War II.

== Early life ==
James Henry Forman was born in Kirkfield, Ontario, Canada on 1 February 1896. When he enlisted in the Canadian Expeditionary Force on 29 June 1916, he gave his profession as minister and listed his mother Mary as his next of kin. He had three months prior military experience. He was six feet tall, with medium complexion, gray eyes, and black hair. A scar on his right foot served as a distinguishing mark. He was assigned Regimental Number 490828 and posted to the 3rd Training Brigade of the Canadian Expeditionary Force.

== World War I aerial service ==
Forman transferred into the Royal Naval Air Service and underwent pilot's training. His initial assignment was to 6 Naval Squadron, where he scored his first aerial victory on 27 July 1917. He was wounded in action the following day, then transferred into 1 Naval Squadron and remained with it during its transition into 201 Squadron Royal Air Force, scoring seven victories along the way. On 21 May 1918 Lieutenant J. H. Forman promoted to temporary captain.

On 2 July 1918, Forman was awarded the Distinguished Flying Cross by his king. On 7 August 1918, the DFC was officially gazetted:

"A skilful patrol leader, who has displayed on all occasions a high standard of courage, endurance, and skill. In a period of ten months he has been engaged on seventy-seven offensive patrols, and has brought down three enemy aeroplanes in flames and five out of control."

Forman was reassigned to 70 Squadron as a Flight Commander. He scored one victory while leading a flight for his new unit. Then, on 4 September 1918, Forman was flying one of a dozen Sopwith Camels that engaged German fliers from Jagdgeschwader III. The German opponents included aces Bruno Loerzer and Otto Fruhner. Forman was one of eight pilots downed by the Germans in the largest single loss of Camels during the war.

== Post World War I ==
Forman survived the war and served into the 1920s. He returned to duty during World War II as a Flight Lieutenant. He died in Santa Barbara, California, USA on 4 October 1972.
