= Flight commander =

Air force position

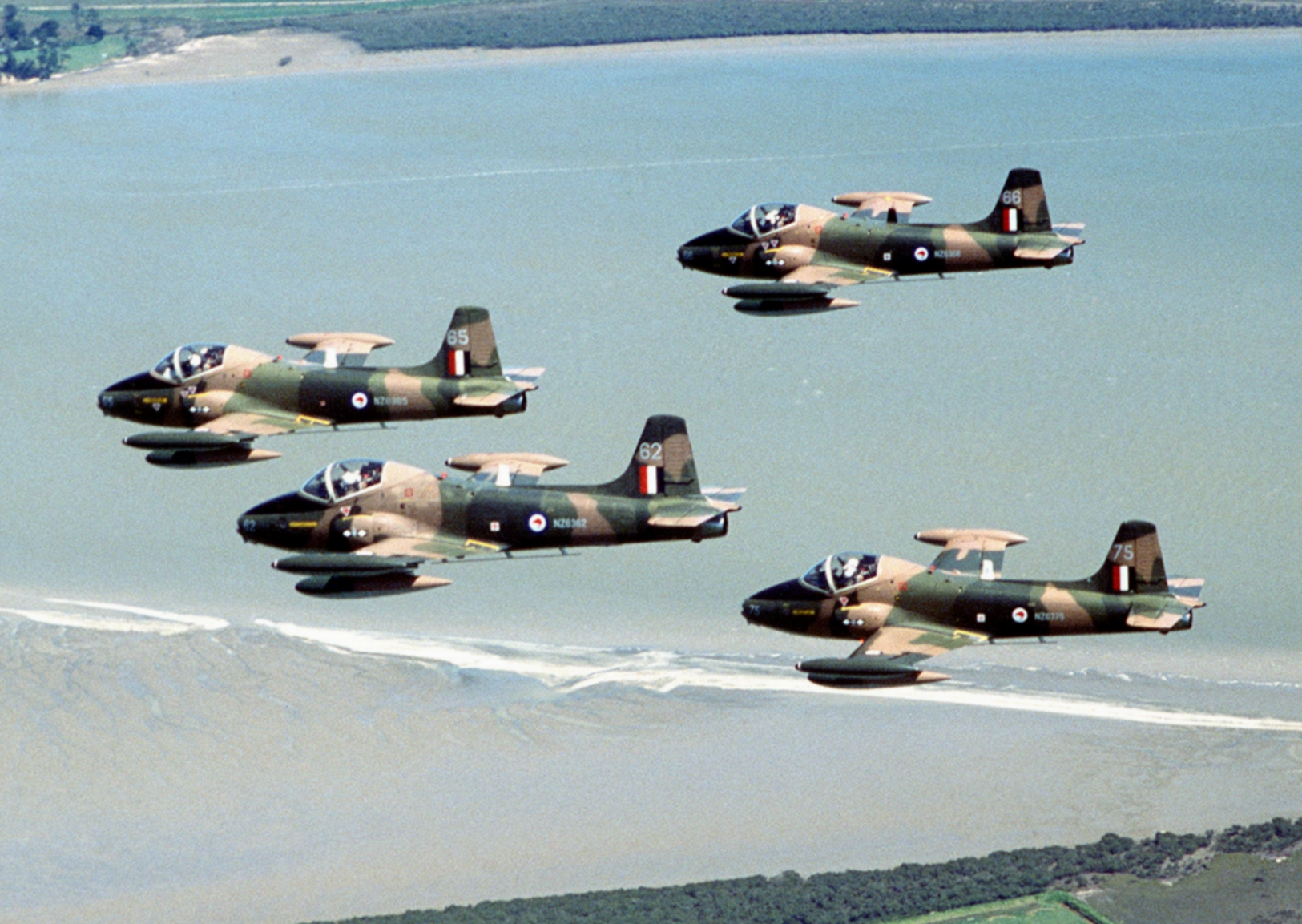
The lefthand airplane in this formation is in the flight commander position.

A flight commander is the leader of a constituent portion of an aerial squadron in aerial operations, often into combat. That constituent portion is known as a flight, and usually contains six or fewer aircraft, with three or four being a common number. The tactical need for commonality in performance characteristics of aircraft usually insures that all aircraft under a flight commander's command and control in air operations are the same or very similar types.

Historically, the role of a flight commander in fighter aircraft has been that of principal attacker in air-to-air combat, with the other airplane or airplanes in a flight supporting and protecting him from counter-attack as a wingman or wingmen. This delineation of roles came into being very early in the history of aerial warfare, as Oswald Boelcke, Roderic Dallas, and Mick Mannock all derived the basic tactics of successful air-to-air combat from their flying experiences during World War I c. 1916.

The flight commander position has traditionally been held by a captain, naval lieutenant, or Commonwealth air force flight lieutenant, with the wingmen being both junior and subordinate to him. However, rank inflation has taken place in many air forces, and that rating may no longer hold true.

In the Royal Naval Air Service of World War I, flight commander was the appointment for a lieutenant commanding a flight with its own rank insignia.

Flight commander is also the title of the officer commanding a ground-based flight, a platoon-sized unit in the United States Air Force, the Royal Air Force and other Commonwealth air forces.

== See also ==
- Military hierarchy of air forces
