= Charles Dawson Booker =

English World War I fighter ace

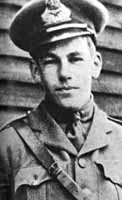
- Born: 21 April 1897; Burnt House Cottage, Speldhurst, Royal Tunbridge Wells, Kent, England
- Died: 13 August 1918 (aged 21); West of Rosieres, France
- Burial place: Vignacourt British Cemetery, Somme, France
- Military career
- Allegiance: United Kingdom
- Branch: Royal Naval Air Service; Royal Air Force
- Service years: 1915–1918
- Rank: Major
- Units: No. 1 Squadron RNAS; No. 8 Squadron RAF
- Commands: No. 201 Squadron RAF
- Awards: Distinguished Service Cross; French Croix de Guerre

Major Charles Dawson Booker DSC (sometimes hyphenated into Dawson-Booker) (21 April 1897 – 13 August 1918) was an English World War I fighter ace credited with 29 victories. He was promoted to high rank while relatively young as a result of his gallantry and unswerving dedication to his country.

== Early life ==
Charles Dawson Booker was born to Joseph Dawson and Rachel C. Booker at Burnt House Cottage, Speldhurst, Royal Tunbridge Wells, Kent, England. He spent part of his youth in Australia, attending the Grammar School in Melbourne from February 1908 through December 1911. He then returned to England and attended Bedford School until May 1915. On 8 September 1915, he was accepted into the Royal Naval Air Service as a Flight Sub-Lieutenant.

== First tour of service ==
He served on the Belgian Coast, first with 5 Naval Wing, then with 8 Naval Squadron from May through October 1916, and further inland for another year, through November 1917. He did not open his victory roll until 23 January 1917, after his transfer to 8 Naval, when he drove an Albatros D.III down out of control while piloting a Sopwith Pup.

After a lapse of some months, he used a Sopwith Triplane to score four times in April, becoming an ace on the 30th. Even at this early stage, he was flight commander of C Flight despite his youth. He was described by one of his wingmen as "...a little fellow, usually very silent, who fears nothing, but he would run a mile from any girl....he hopes the war will go on forever because he loves air fighting, and if the war were to end he is afraid he might not be able to find a suitable job."

May was an especially notable month for Booker, with nine victories, including a triple on the 24th.

On 22 June, after his 17th win, he was awarded the Distinguished Service Cross; the citation noted his three wins tallied on 24 May.

After three victories in July, he shot down and badly wounded German ace Hauptmann Adolf Ritter von Tutschek, commander of Jasta 12, on 11 August 1917; Tutschek would take half a year to recover. In this same fight, Booker was so badly shot about that German ace Viktor Schobinger claimed Booker as a victory. Booker actually managed to coax his destroyed 'Tripehound' to a forced landing in friendly territory. He had used Sopwith Triplanes (his usual aircraft being serial number N5482, which he whimsically dubbed 'Maude') to run his string of triumphs to 23 by this time. The crash landing on the 11th was the end of 'Maude'. It had been his mount for at least 14 triumphs.

On 27 September, he scored his first victory while flying a Sopwith Camel; he shot down German ace Oberleutnant Hans Waldhausen of Jasta 37, who became a prisoner.

However, Naval 8, and Booker, were withdrawn from action in November and returned to England. Booker was the fourth ranked of the 25 aces in this prestigious squadron.

== Second tour of service ==
After some months back in England, he returned to France as a Major commanding 201 Squadron of the newly formed Royal Air Force. He had been given the command in March, just shy of his 21st birthday. Once again, he would be flying a Camel.

He led 201 by example, scoring two May victories and one in July. In May, on the 27th, he identified the body of his friend, Australian ace Robert Little, who had been shot down nearby.

On 13 August 1918, he was leading a rookie pilot on an orientation tour of their aerial battlefield. The two Camel pilots ran into a formation of at least six expert pilots from Jagdgeschwader 2. Booker tackled them single-handedly to cover the green pilot's retreat. It was the greenhorn who verified Booker's final three wins. However, Jasta 12's ace Leutnant Ulrich Neckel finally shot Booker down.

Booker was buried in Vignacourt British Cemetery, Somme, France.

He had claimed 29 victories; he shared in the capture of two enemy airplanes; destroyed ten, including six victories shared with other pilots; and drove down 17 'out of control', including five shared wins.

== Awards ==
Distinguished Service Cross

Flt. Lieut, (act. Flt. Cdr.) Charles Dawson Booker.

"For special gallantry in the field on numerous occasions, especially the following:

On 26 April 1917, he went to the assistance of some of our photographic machines, which were about to be attacked by twelve Albatross scouts. One of-these he fired on at close range, and brought it down out of control. On 24 May 1917, whilst on patrol, he went to the assistance of a formation of our machines, which was being attacked by nine hostile scouts. He attacked one of the latter, which was driven down-in flames and crashed. Later in the same day he attacked and drove down out of control another hostile machine. On numerous other occasions he has attacked enemy machines and driven them down out of control."

— Supplement to the London Gazette, 22 June 1917 (30147/6256)

Charles Dawson Booker was also awarded the Croix de guerre on 14 July 1917.

== Bibliography ==
- Franks, Norman (2004). Sopwith Triplanes Aces of World War 1. Osprey Publishing (UK). ISBN 978-1-84176-728-4.
- Shores, Christopher (1990). Above the Trenches. Grub Street. ISBN 978-0-948817-19-9.
- Franks, Norman (2003). Sopwith Camel Aces of World War I. Osprey Publishing. ISBN 978-1-84176-534-1.
- "St Mary's Church, Speldhurst: Roll of Honour". speldhurst.org. 2014. Archived from the original on 24 March 2016.
- "Vignacourt British cemetery". vignacourt.free.fr. 2014.
- "Bedford St Andrews: Roll of Honour". roll-of-honour.com. 2010.
