= Francis Casey =

Irish World War I flying ace

- Born: 3 August 1890; Clonmel, County Tipperary, Ireland
- Died: 11 August 1917 (aged 27)
- Burial place: Adinkerke Military Cemetery, Belgium; 51°04′15″N 2°36′09″E
- Military career
- Allegiance: United Kingdom
- Branch: Royal Navy
- Service years: 1915–1917
- Rank: Flight Commander
- Unit: No. 3 (Naval) Squadron RNAS
- Conflicts: First World War: Western Front
- Awards: Distinguished Service Cross; Mentioned in Despatches

Francis Dominic Casey, DSC (3 August 1890 – 11 August 1917) was an Irish flying ace of the Royal Naval Air Service during the First World War, credited with nine aerial victories. He received the Distinguished Service Cross before his death during a test flight in 1917.

== Early life ==
Francis Dominic Casey was born in Clonmel, County Tipperary, the youngest son of Maurice J. Casey and Agnes M. Casey, and was educated at St George's College, Weybridge.

== First World War ==
In August 1914, when the First World War broke out, Casey was working for the P&O. On 25 May 1915 he was granted a temporary commission as a sub-lieutenant in the Royal Naval Reserve, and on 30 May he was posted to HMS President for duty with the Royal Naval Air Service. On 27 May 1916 Casey's Royal Naval Reserve commission was cancelled, and the following day he was re-commissioned as a probationary flight sub-lieutenant in the Royal Naval Air Service. On 3 August 1916 he was confirmed in his rank of flight sub-lieutenant, with seniority from 28 May.

Casey served in No. 2 Wing, and was eventually posted to No. 3 (Naval) Squadron to fly the Sopwith Pup single-seat fighter. He gained his first aerial victory on 17 March 1917, driving down out of control a Halberstadt D.II fighter over Bapaume. On 1 April Casey was promoted to flight lieutenant, and gained his second victory a week later, driving down an Albatros D.III fighter on 8 April. He then gained seven more victories, six of them D.III fighters, in only twelve days, from 21 April to 2 May. On 12 May he received a mention in despatches, and on 22 June was awarded the Distinguished Service Cross. His citation read:

Flight Lieutenant Francis Dominic Casey, R.N.A.S.
For conspicuous bravery and skill in attacking hostile aircraft on numerous occasions. On 21 April 1917, he attacked a hostile two-seater machine at a range varying from 40 to 100 yards, and brought it down completely out of control. On 23 April 1917, on four different occasions during one flight, he attacked hostile machines, one of which was driven down in a spinning nose dive and another turning over on its side went down completely out of control. This officer has driven down four machines completely out of control, and forced many others down.

Appointed to the acting rank of flight commander, Casey died in a flying accident during a test flight on 11 August 1917. He is buried in Adinkerke Military Cemetery in De Panne, West Flanders, Belgium.

== List of aerial victories ==
Combat record
No.	Date/Time	Aircraft/ Serial No.	Opponent	Result	Location	Notes
1	17 March 1917 @ 1040 hours	Sopwith Pup (N6163)	Halberstadt D.II	Driven down out of control	North-east of Bapaume	
2	8 April 1917 @ 1500 hours	Sopwith Pup (N6182)	Albatros D.III	Driven down out of control	North-east of Pronville	
3	21 April 1917 @ 1730 hours	Sopwith Pup (N6182)	Albatros D.III	Destroyed	Hendecourt	
4	21 April 1917 @ 1730 hours	Sopwith Pup (N6182)	Albatros D.III	Driven down out of control	Hendecourt	
5	23 April 1917 @ 1730 hours	Sopwith Pup (N6182)	Albatros D.III	Driven down out of control	Cagnicourt	
6	24 April 1917 @ 1650 hours	Sopwith Pup (N6182)	DFW reconnaissance aircraft	Captured	Morchies—Louverval	Victory shared with Flight Lieutenant Herbert Travers and Flight Sub-Lieutenant John Joseph Malone.
7	26 April 1917 @ 1915 hours	Sopwith Pup (N6182)	Albatros D.III	Driven down out of control	Cambrai	
8	29 April 1917 @ 1100 hours	Sopwith Pup (N6182)	Albatros D.III	Set afire; destroyed	Between Bantouzelle and Cambrai	
9	2 May 1917 @ 1120 hours	Sopwith Pup (N6182)	Albatros D.III	Driven down out of control	Mœuvres	
