= John Mungo-Park =

British World War II flying ace

John Colin Mungo-Park
- John Mungo-Park drawn by Cuthbert Orde (1940)
- Born: 25 March 1918; Wallasey, England
- Died: 27 June 1941 (aged 23); Adinkerke, Belgium
- Burial place: Adinkerke Military Cemetery
- Military career
- Allegiance: United Kingdom
- Branch: Royal Air Force
- Service years: 1937–1941
- Rank: Squadron Leader
- Service number: 40008
- Commands: No. 74 Squadron RAF
- Conflicts: Second World War: Battle of Dunkirk; Battle of Britain
- Awards: Distinguished Flying Cross & Bar

John Colin Mungo-Park, DFC & Bar (25 March 1918 – 27 June 1941) was a Royal Air Force fighter pilot and flying ace of the Second World War. He was awarded the Distinguished Flying Cross in 1940, and a Bar to the medal in 1941.

== Background and early life ==
Born John Colin Park on 25 March 1918 in Wallasey on the Wirral, he was the second son and third child of Colin Archibald Mungo Park and Marion (née Haswell) Park. His sister Linda had been born in 1913, and brother Geoffrey in 1915. Mungo-Park's father, Colin, had joined the British Army at the start of the First World War as a private with the 7th Battalion of the Royal Sussex Regiment. On 24 October 1918, just seven months after his son's birth, Lance Corporal Colin Park was killed in action during the Hundred Days Offensive. He is buried in the Valenciennes (St Roch) Military Cemetery in France.

John Mungo-Park was educated as a boarder at Liverpool College, where he was a successful athlete and sportsman. 'Mungo' had been a family forename for many generations, and he used the surname Mungo-Park from his schooldays onward.

The family moved to Bolton in 1934, where a neighbour had a pilot's licence and keen interest in aviation. He and Mungo-Park became firm friends, and it was here that the passion for flying was born.

== Royal Air Force ==
Mungo-Park joined the Royal Air Force on a short service commission in June 1937 and was made acting pilot officer on 9 August. He was confirmed as a pilot officer on 31 May 1938, and was posted to the Anti Aircraft Co-operation Unit of the Fleet Air Arm at Lee on Solent and then in August 1938 to HMS Argus flying Fairey Swordfish.

The day after war was declared in September 1939, Mungo-Park transferred to No. 74 Squadron RAF flying Spitfires from RAF Hornchurch, commanded by Sailor Malan. He was promoted to flying officer 31 December.

On 24 May 1940, while No. 74 Squadron were providing cover for the British retreat from France and the Dunkirk evacuation, Mungo-Park was wounded and his Spitfire damaged during an engagement with a Henschel Hs 126, but he managed to recross the Channel and land at RAF Rochford.

On 10 July the squadron was engaged a large formation of Dornier Do-17s and their escort of Bf 109s and Bf 110s. Mungo claimed one Dornier, which he saw "turn lazily on its back and dive into the sea".

On 11 August he was involved in four major air battles. During the first of these Mungo scored one Bf 109 destroyed and one damaged. In the day's third combat, over a convoy 'Booty' off Clacton, Mungo attacked two Bf 110s in quick succession and saw the first crash into the sea and the second go down pouring black smoke. He was awarded one 'destroyed' and 'one probable'. One further victory followed in the day's fourth air battle over Hawkinge, when his section was vectored onto a formation of Ju87s and Bf 109s off Margate. He led the attack on the 109s and his five-second burst into one of the fighters caused it to burst into flames and plunge into the sea.

On 13 August No. 74 Squadron were vectored over the Thames Estuary onto an unescorted formation of Dornier 17s. Mungo claimed one destroyed amongst a squadron total of fourteen enemy aircraft claimed destroyed or probably destroyed.

On 20 October he claimed the Bf 109E-7B Werk # 2059 "Brown 8" flown by Uffz. Franz Maierl (3.(J)/LG 2) who crashed at Chapel Farm, Lenham Heath, Kent.

He was awarded the Distinguished Flying Cross (DFC) on 15 November 1940. The citation read:

Acting Flight Lieutenant John Colin MUNGO-PARK (40008), No. 74 Squadron.
In October, 1940, this officer was on patrol with his squadron at 30,000 feet when a formation of enemy aircraft were sighted. Flight Lieutenant Mungo-Park attacked a Messerschmitt 109 but had to break off the engagement as his windscreen became iced up. He cleaned this and again attacked the enemy aircraft and caused it to crash into the sea. He has personally destroyed eight hostile aircraft and has at all times displayed great courage and coolness in action.

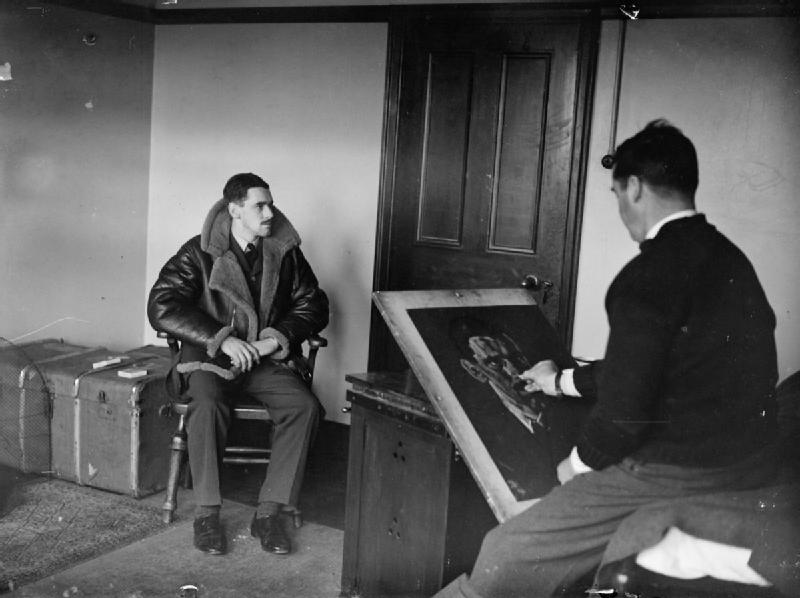
Mungo-Park having his portrait painted by Eric Kennington

Now recognised as one of the cream of the Allied fighter pilots, he was one of the fraction of The Few selected by Fighter Command to have their portraits drawn by Cuthbert Orde, sitting for it in December 1940.

On 14 November 1940 No. 74 Squadron claimed a total of 13 Ju 87s in a mass dogfight over Dover, Mungo-Park personally claiming two.

On 30 November he and Harbourne Stephen jointly claimed a Bf 109 (of Uffz. Wagelin 5./JG 53) that was deemed the 600th victory claimed by squadrons flying from RAF Biggin Hill.

Exactly a year since his last promotion, on 31 December 1940, he was promoted to flight lieutenant.

On 10 March 1941 Sailor Malan was promoted, and Mungo-Park became acting squadron leader.

On 16 June 1941 while on a sweep ("Circus 14") over the Channel he shot down two Messerschmitt Bf 109s, but in the fight his plane was damaged. He turned for home but his engine seized as he crossed the coast. Nonetheless, Mungo-Park managed to stay airborne, gliding his Spitfire back to RAF Hawkinge. For this display of skill, as well as his continued leadership and growing tally of kills, he was told he was to receive a Bar to his DFC.

On the evening of 27 June 1941, flying Spitfire Vb X4668, Mungo-Park was part of an escort for a bombing raid over northern France coded 'Circus 25'. They were attacked by two formations of Bf 109s, led by Rolf Pingel of I./JG 26 (who had been spared by Bob Doe during the Battle of Britain) and Wilhelm Balthasar of JG 2.

He was shot down and killed when his plane crashed just north of Dunkirk, a couple of miles over the Belgian border. He is buried in Adinkerke Military Cemetery, about 60 miles north of his father. In a twist of fate, Wilhelm Balthasar died in an air crash less than a week later and was buried in a Flanders cemetery alongside his father who had been killed in the First World War.

A Bar to Mungo-Park's DFC was announced posthumously on 11 July 1941 with the citation:

Acting Squadron Leader John Colin MUNGO-PARK, D.F.C. (40008), No. 74 Squadron.

(Since reported missing.)

This officer has performed excellent work in his many engagements against the enemy and has destroyed at least twelve of their aircraft. In June, 1941, he was attacked by six Messerschmitt 109's while over the French coast. He succeeded in shooting down two of these and, although his own aircraft was badly damaged, Squadron Leader Mungo-Park flew back to this country making a skilful forced landing. His courage and leadership have contributed materially to the successes achieved by his squadron.

Mungo-Park had claimed 11 aircraft destroyed (and 2 shared), 5 probables, and 4 damaged.

== Memorials ==
Thanks to the efforts of Belgian Johny Recour, who had witnessed Mungo-Park's crash as a boy, a memorial service was held on 22 May 2006.

Mungo Park Way in Orpington, Mungo Park Road in South Hornchurch and Mungo Park Close in Bushey are named after John Mungo-Park. In all three places, other roads in the surrounding estates are also named after pilots in the Battle of Britain.
