= Herbert Travers =

British flying ace (1891–1958)

- Born: 1 April 1891; Kensington, London, England
- Died: 16 April 1958 (aged 67)
- Military career
- Allegiance: United Kingdom
- Branch: British Army; Royal Navy; Royal Air Force
- Service years: 1914–1919; 1926–1929; 1939–1945
- Rank: Squadron leader
- Nickname: Tiny
- Units: Honourable Artillery Company; No. 3 Squadron RNAS
- Commands: No. 11 Squadron RNAS/No. 211 Squadron RAF
- Conflicts: First World War: Western Front; Second World War
- Awards: Distinguished Service Cross; Mentioned in dispatches
- Other work: Test pilot, flight instructor, airline pilot

Herbert Gardner Travers, DSC (1 April 1891 – 16 April 1958) was a British flying ace of the First World War, credited with five aerial victories. He later worked in civil aviation and returned to service during the Second World War.

== Early life and background ==
Travers was born in Kensington, London. In 1910, he joined the family firm of Joseph Travers and Sons Ltd., but left to enlist in the British Army on the outbreak of the First World War in 1914.

== First World War ==
Travers served in France as a member of the Machine Gun Section of 1st Battalion, Honourable Artillery Company, before entering the Royal Navy in December 1915 as a probationary flight sub-lieutenant to serve in the Royal Naval Air Service. He was confirmed in his rank on 14 December 1915, and received Royal Aero Club Aviator's Certificate No. 2556 on 23 January 1916.

On 27 May 1916, Travers joined No. 1 Wing RNAS, flying reconnaissance missions on the Western Front. He was promoted to flight lieutenant on 1 October 1916 and, after a rest at the end of the year, was assigned to No. 3 (Naval) Squadron in early 1917, flying a Sopwith Pup single-seat fighter. He gained his first victory on 11 March 1917 driving down an Albatros reconnaissance aircraft out of control over Bapaume. Three more enemy aircraft, all Albatros D.III fighters, were driven down on 17 March, 8 and 21 April, and finally on 24 April, Travers, John Malone and Francis Casey shared in the capture of DFW reconnaissance aircraft at Morchies. On 7 May 1917 he was appointed an acting flight commander.

Travers' award of the Distinguished Service Cross was gazetted on 22 June 1917, his citation reading:

Flight Lieutenant (now Acting Flight Commander) H. G. Travers, RNAS.
In recognition of his services with the Army in France. This officer has himself brought down three hostile aeroplanes completely out of control, and has taken part in two other combats in which enemy machines were forced to land in our lines. He has always shown the greatest determination in leading his flight on offensive patrols, and has on many occasions driven down superior numbers of hostile machines.

By that time Travers was in a new assignment, based at Dunkirk, flying anti-submarine patrols over the North Sea. He was promoted to flight commander on 30 June 1917. He served as the Commanding Officer of No. 11 (Naval) Squadron RNAS, a bomber squadron, from 11 March to 25 May 1918, during which time (on 1 April 1918) the Royal Naval Air Service was merged with the Army's Royal Flying Corps to form the Royal Air Force, and his unit became No. 211 Squadron RAF. On 1 May 1919, he was appointed an acting major, and was transferred to the RAF unemployed list on 24 August 1919.

== Inter-war career ==
Travers returned to flying in 1926, being commissioned as a probationary flying officer (Class "A") in the General Duties Branch of the Reserve of Air Force Officers on 22 June, and was confirmed in his rank on 22 December. He was promoted to flight lieutenant on 31 July 1928, but relinquished his commission on 22 June 1929, on completion of service.

At the same time Travers was employed by the Blackburn Aeroplane and Manufacturing Company as a test pilot and seaplane pilot from 1926 until 1928. Between 1928 and 1933 he was a flying instructor, at the Bristol and Wessex Club, the Cinque Ports Flying Club, and the London Aeroplane Club. He was a pilot in Alan Cobham's National Air Display company in 1934, flying at air shows and exhibitions, then became a commercial pilot in 1935, working for Spartan Air Lines, Imperial Airways and British Airways, up until 1938.

== Second World War ==
On 5 January 1939 Travers returned to the Royal Air Force Reserve, being commissioned as a flight lieutenant (Class "CC"). On 1 September 1939, just two days before the declaration of war with Germany, Travers relinquished his commission in the Reserves, entering the Administrative and Special Duties Branch of the Royal Air Force Volunteer Reserve. By 1 January 1941, when he received a mention in despatches, Travers was an acting squadron leader, and was promoted to that rank on 1 December 1941.

After the war Travers remained on the Emergency List of the RAFVR, finally relinquishing his commission on 10 February 1954, retaining the rank of squadron leader.

Travers died in 1958.

== Personal life ==
Travers married Hermia Fraser on 6 August 1919 at Ryton, Shropshire.

His two brothers also had distinguished flying careers:

- James Lindsay Travers (1883–1924) was an engineer and designer who worked for the Royal Engineers Balloon Factory and Short Brothers before serving in the RNAS during World War I as a test pilot, ending the war as a lieutenant-colonel in the RAF. Post-war he worked at the Air Ministry and as a technical adviser to Chilean Naval Air Service, until dying in an air crash in 1924.
- Charles Tindal Travers (1898–1968) joined the Worcestershire Regiment in 1916, then served the Royal Flying Corps, 1917–1918. He served in the Royal Canadian Air Force from 1928 to 1932 as an air engineer and pilot, and for the Manitoba Forestry Service, 1932–1934.

In 1990 Travers' daughter wrote and published Cross Country, a biography of her father and uncles.

== Bibliography ==
- Shores, Christopher F.; Franks, Norman & Guest, Russell F. (1990). Above the Trenches: a Complete Record of the Fighter Aces and Units of the British Empire Air Forces 1915–1920. London, UK: Grub Street. ISBN 978-0-948817-19-9.
