= John Joseph Malone =

Canadian flying ace

- Born: 20 December 1894; Inglewood, Caledon, Ontario, Canada
- Died: 30 April 1917 (aged 22); Near Rumaucourt, France
- Burial place: Arras Flying Services Memorial
- Military career
- Allegiance: United Kingdom
- Branch: Royal Naval Air Service
- Rank: Flight Sub-Lieutenant
- Nickname: "Jack"
- Unit: No. 3 Naval Squadron RNAS
- Conflicts: First World War
- Awards: Distinguished Service Order; Mentioned in Despatches

John Joseph Malone, DSO (20 December 1894 – 30 April 1917) was a Canadian flying ace of the Royal Naval Air Service during the First World War. He was credited with 10 aerial victories and received the Distinguished Service Order before dying in combat.

== Early life ==
John Joseph Malone was born in Inglewood, Ontario, Canada on 20 December 1894; his parents were Mary C. Wallace and Edmund J. Malone. At the time of the younger Malone's enlistment on 11 December 1914, they were residing in Regina, Saskatchewan. Malone gave his occupation as "gas engine mechanic". The medical officer noted that Malone was 5 feet 4 inches tall, with medium complexion, blue eyes, and brown hair. A scar on his hip was described as an identifying mark. A scrawl across the enlistment form seems to indicate that Malone was already "tagged" for flying duty; it reads, "Malone... to learn aviation".

== First World War ==
Malone learned to fly at the Curtiss Flying School at the Long Branch Aerodrome in Ontario. He earned his Royal Aero Club pilot's certificate on 15 July 1916, and was commissioned as a probationary flight sub-lieutenant in the Royal Naval Air Service the same day. He then shipped out for Britain.

On 1 February 1917, Malone was posted to No. 3 Wing RNAS (later designated No. 3 Naval Squadron RNAS). He scored his first aerial victory on 4 March. After scoring a triple victory followed by a single one, he was an ace. Another triple win followed, bringing his tally to eight.

On 24 April 1917, Malone managed to force a German two-seater to ground for a ninth triumph; Malone's engine then quit, forcing him to land his Sopwith Pup next to his victim. The German observer died of his wounds; his pilot was also wounded. Malone took custody of the pilot while under a barrage of artillery fire. Malone's pilot report states, in part:

... after a burst of fire the rear gunner (Observer) dropped down into his cockpit but soon came up again and fired at me when I had closed to about 20 yards range. He then disappeared again into his cockpit. I forced EA to land intact. I then opened my throttle but my engine refused to respond. So, I landed beside the EA and we were shelled by German artillery after helping the German pilot to remove the badly wounded observer from his cockpit. He died within about ten minutes. The German pilot was slightly wounded in the head.

Malone escorted him back to the squadron mess before the German departed into captivity.

Leonard Rochford, a British pilot in Malone's squadron, refers to the incident in some detail in his memoir, I Chose the Sky, published after the war:

... this German pilot... stayed with us in the Officers' Mess for a few days... he was a pleasant, friendly little man with a sense of humour. He was also something of an artist and drew several pencil sketches for us... On his departure he said he had enjoyed staying with us very much.

A tenth win two days later ended his string. Four days later, on 30 April 1917, Malone was shot down and killed by Paul Billik, beginning the latter's career as an ace. Malone is honored at the Arras Flying Services Memorial.

The award of Malone's Distinguished Service Order was posthumously gazetted on 23 May 1917:

For successfully attacking and bringing down hostile aircraft on numerous occasions. At about 6.30 a.m. on April 23rd, 1917, while on patrol, he attacked a hostile scout and drove it down under control. He then attacked a second scout, which, after the pilot had been hit, turned over on its back and went down through the clouds. A third scout, attacked by him from a distance of about 20 yards, descended completely out of control. While engaging a fourth machine he ran out of ammunition, so returned to the advanced landing ground, replenished his supply, and at once returned, and attacked another hostile formation, one of which he forced down out of control. On the afternoon of April 24th, 1917, he engaged a hostile two-seater machine, and, after badly wounding the observer, forced it to land on our side of the lines.

== List of aerial victories ==
| No. | Date/time | Aircraft | Foe | Result | Location | Notes |
|---|---|---|---|---|---|---|
| 1 | 4 March 1917 @ 1145 hours | Sopwith Pup serial number 9898 | Halberstadt D.II fighter plane | Driven down out of control | Manancourt, France | |
| 2 | 17 March 1917 @ 1025 hours | Sopwith Pup s/n 9898 | German reconnaissance plane | Driven down out of control | Northeast of Bapaume, France | |
| 3 | 17 March 1917 @ 1100 hours | Sopwith Pup s/n 9898 | Albatros D.II fighter | Destroyed by fire | Ervillers, France | |
| 4 | 17 March 1917 @ 1450 hours | Sopwith Pup s/n 9898 | Albatros D.II fighter | Destroyed by fire | Arras, France | |
| 5 | 21 April 1917 @ 1740 hours | Sopwith Pup s/n 6208 | German reconnaissance plane | Driven down out of control | 5 miles north of Queant, France | |
| 6 | 23 April 1917 @ | Sopwith Pup s/n 6208 | Albatros D.III fighter] | Destroyed | Croisilles, France | |
| 7 | 23 April 1917 @ | Sopwith Pup s/n 6208 | Albatros D.III fighter | Driven down out of control | Croissilles, France | |
| 8 | 23 April 1917 @ 0745 hours | Sopwith Pup s/n 6208 | Albatros D.III fighter | Driven down out of control | Croissilles-Havrincourt, France | |
| 9 | 24 April 1917 @ 1650 hours | Sopwith Pup s/n 6208 | DFW reconnaissance plane | Captured | Morchies-Louverval | Victory shared with Herbert Travers and Francis Casey |
| 10 | 26 April 1917 @ 1915 hours | Sopwith Pup s/n 6202 | Albatros D.III fighter | Destroyed | North of Cambrai, France | |

== See also ==
- Aerial victory standards of World War I
