= Adinkerke Military Cemetery =

Cemetery in West Flanders, Belgium

- Commonwealth War Graves Commission
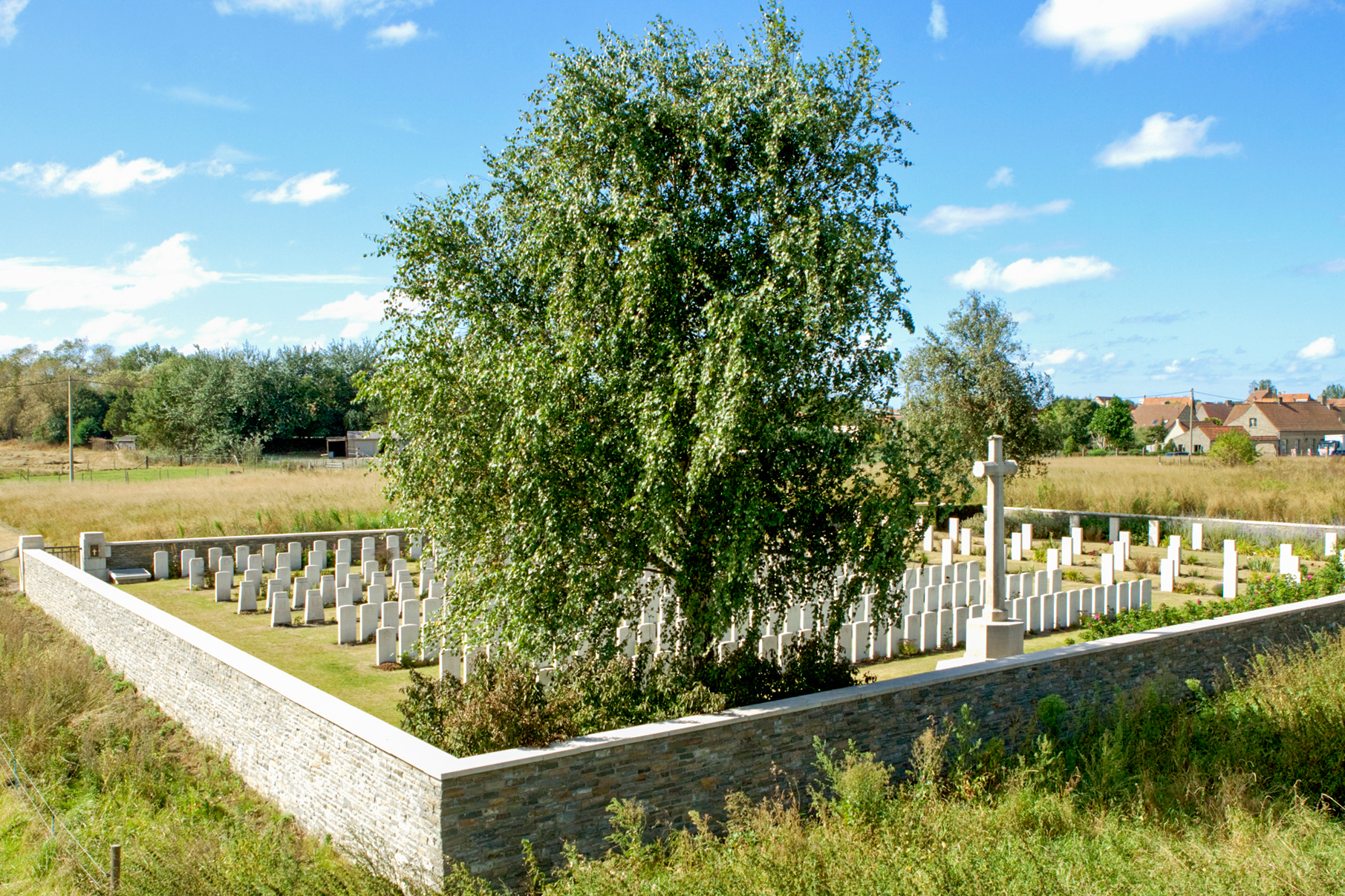
- Used for those deceased 1917–1918, 1940–1944
- Established: June 1917
- Location: 51.0709°N 2.6025°E near Adinkerke, West Flanders, Belgium
- Total burials: 365
- Unknowns: 147

Burials by nation
- * Commonwealth: 223: Czech, Slovak and German: 142

Burials by war
- * World War I: 168 (Commonwealth): World War II: 55 (Commonwealth)

Adinkerke Military Cemetery is a Commonwealth War Graves Commission (CWGC) burial ground for the dead of the Western Front of the First and Second World War. It is located near Adinkerke in the municipality of De Panne in western Belgium, close to the French border. The cemetery is surrounded by farmland and can only be reached via a 50-metre grassed path which is not suitable for vehicles.

== History ==
Adinkerke Military Cemetery was originally established in 1917 for use by the Allied casualty clearing stations located in this area. It was again used between 1940 and 1944.

In addition to the Adinkerke Military Cemetery, there are further military graves in Adinkerke. The "Adinkerke Churchyard Extension" contains a Belgian military cemetery on the west side of the churchyard, as well as 67 Commonwealth burials of the First World War. The Commonwealth War Graves Commission graves are in two small plots and are numbered consecutively with the other graves.

=== First World War ===
Most of the dead from the First World War who are buried in Adinkerke Military Cemetery are casualties who had been wounded nearby and later died in one of the casualty clearing stations in this area. The Commonwealth XV Corps held the front from the Belgian coast to St. Georges between June and November 1917. The 24th and 39th Casualty Clearing Stations were posted at Oosthoek (between Adinkerke and Furnes) from July 1917 to November 1917, and the 1st Canadian Casualty Clearing Station was at Adinkerke for a short time in June 1917.

=== Second World War ===
During the Second World War, the Adinkerke Military Cemetery was used again when the British Expeditionary Force was involved in the later stages of the defence of Belgium following the German invasion in May 1940, and suffered many casualties in covering the withdrawal to Dunkirk. Commonwealth forces did not return until September 1944, but in the intervening years, many airmen were shot down or crashed in raids on strategic objectives in Belgium, or while returning from missions over Germany.

== Description ==
Adinkerke Military Cemetery contains 168 Commonwealth burials of the First World War, and 55 from the Second World War. Soldiers of the Russian Army are also buried here, as are 142 Czech, Slovak and German soldiers, and there is one grave of a member of the Egyptian Labour Corps. There is also a Cross of Sacrifice within the cemetery.

== Notable graves ==
- Flight Commander Francis Dominic Casey DSC (1890–1917), Irish World War I flying ace
- Flight Commander Arnold Jacques Chadwick DSC (1893–1917), Canadian World War I flying ace
- Squadron Leader John Mungo-Park DFC & Bar (1918–1941), English World War II flying ace

== Gallery ==
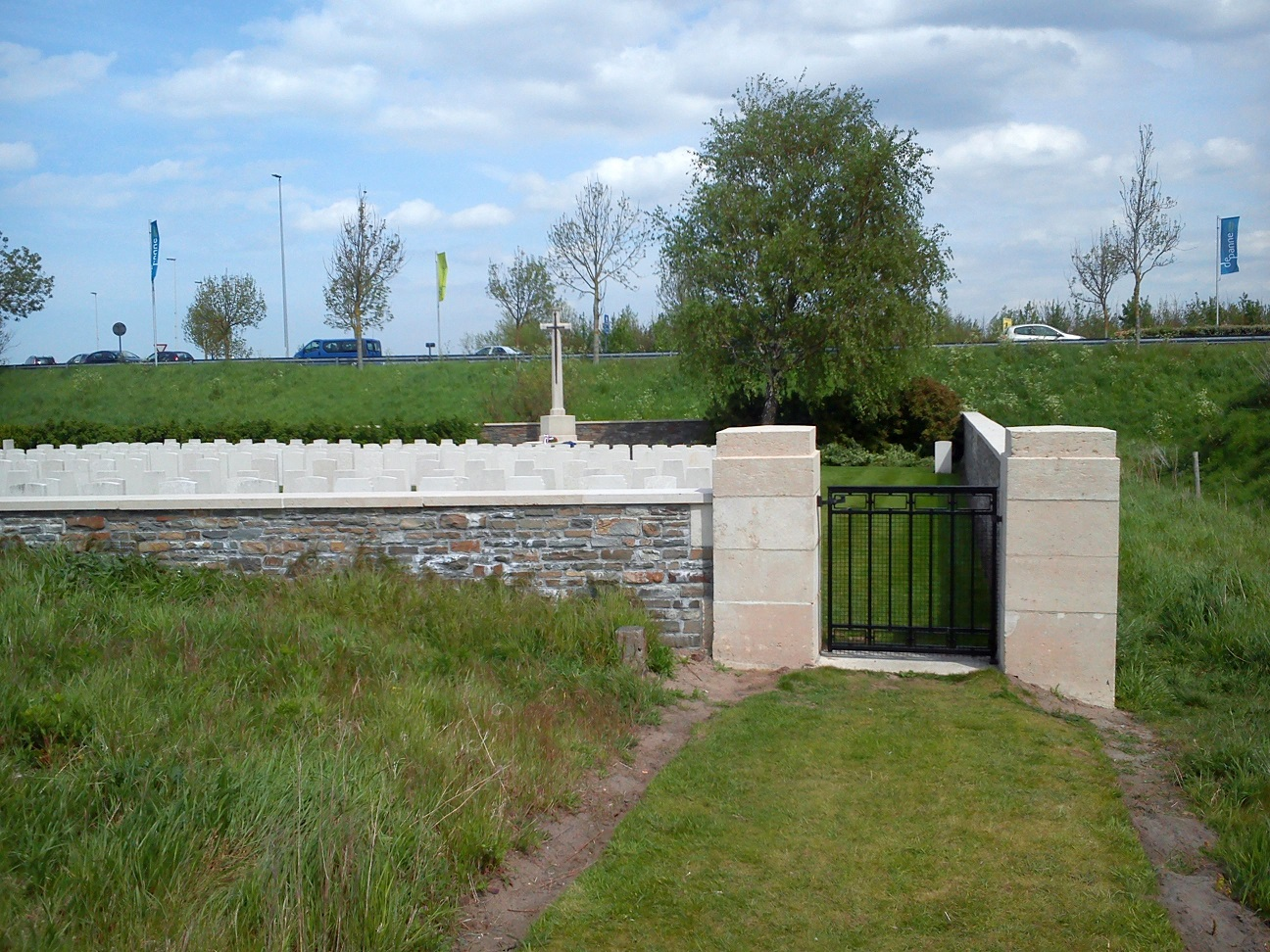

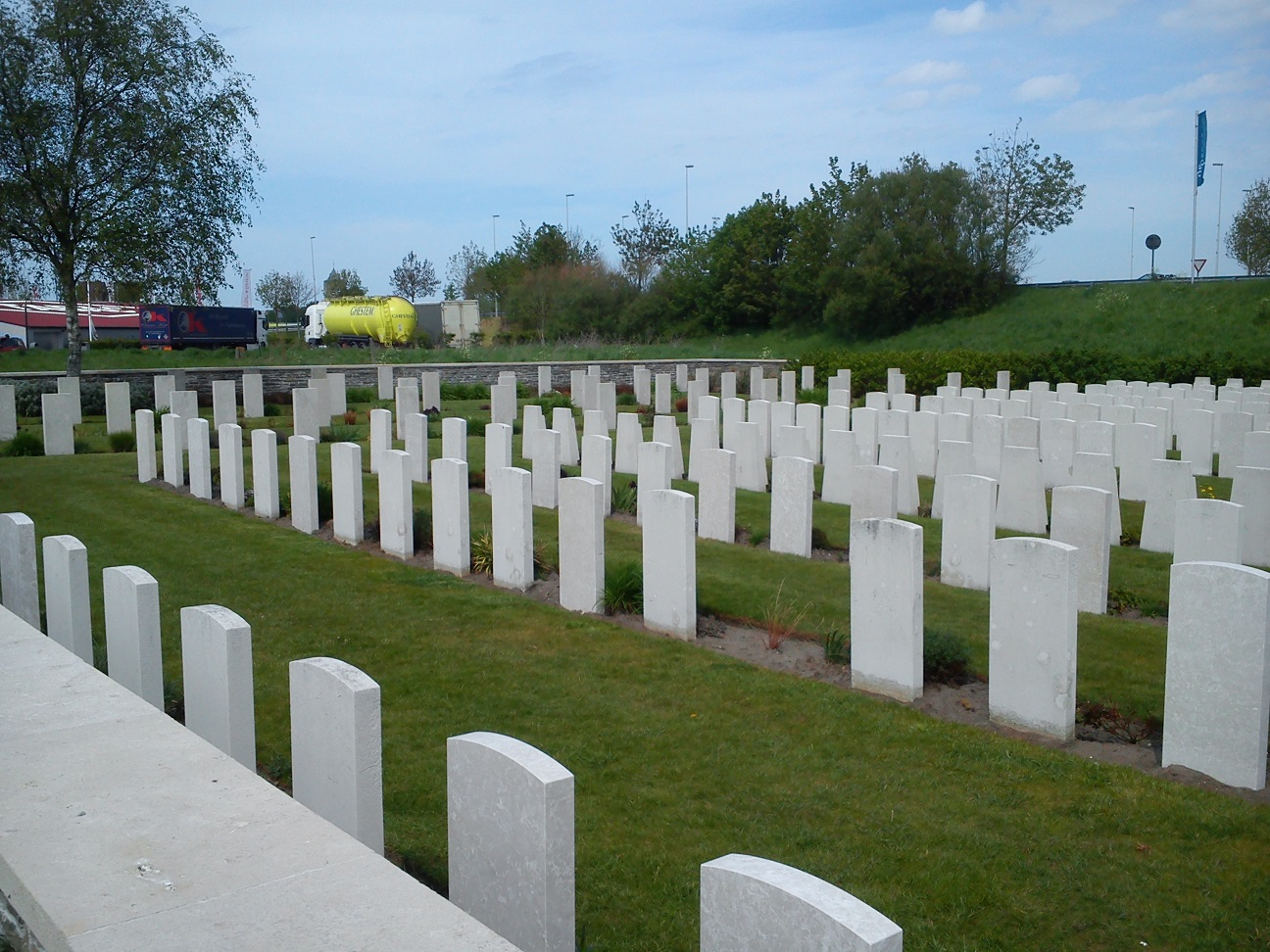

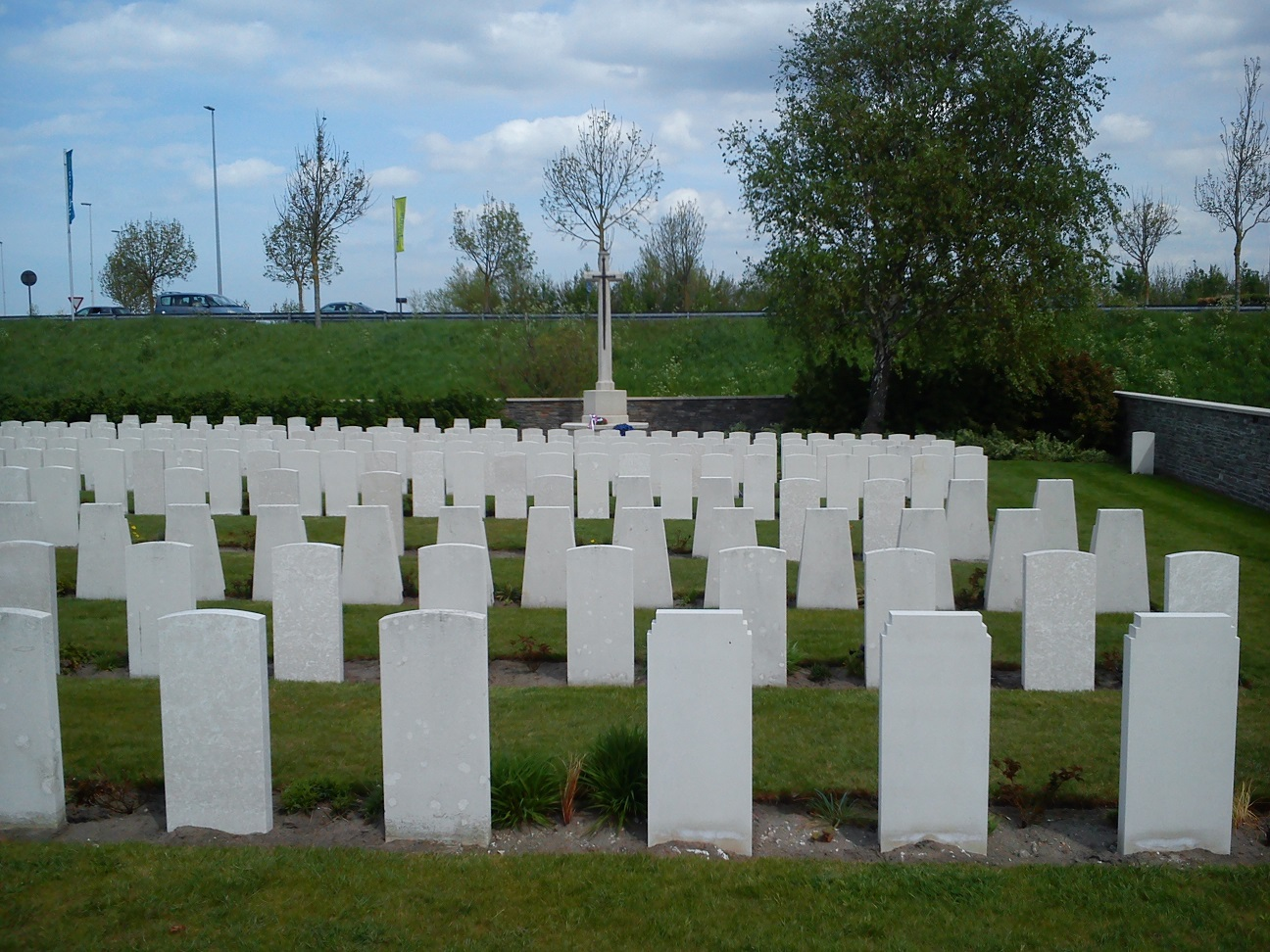

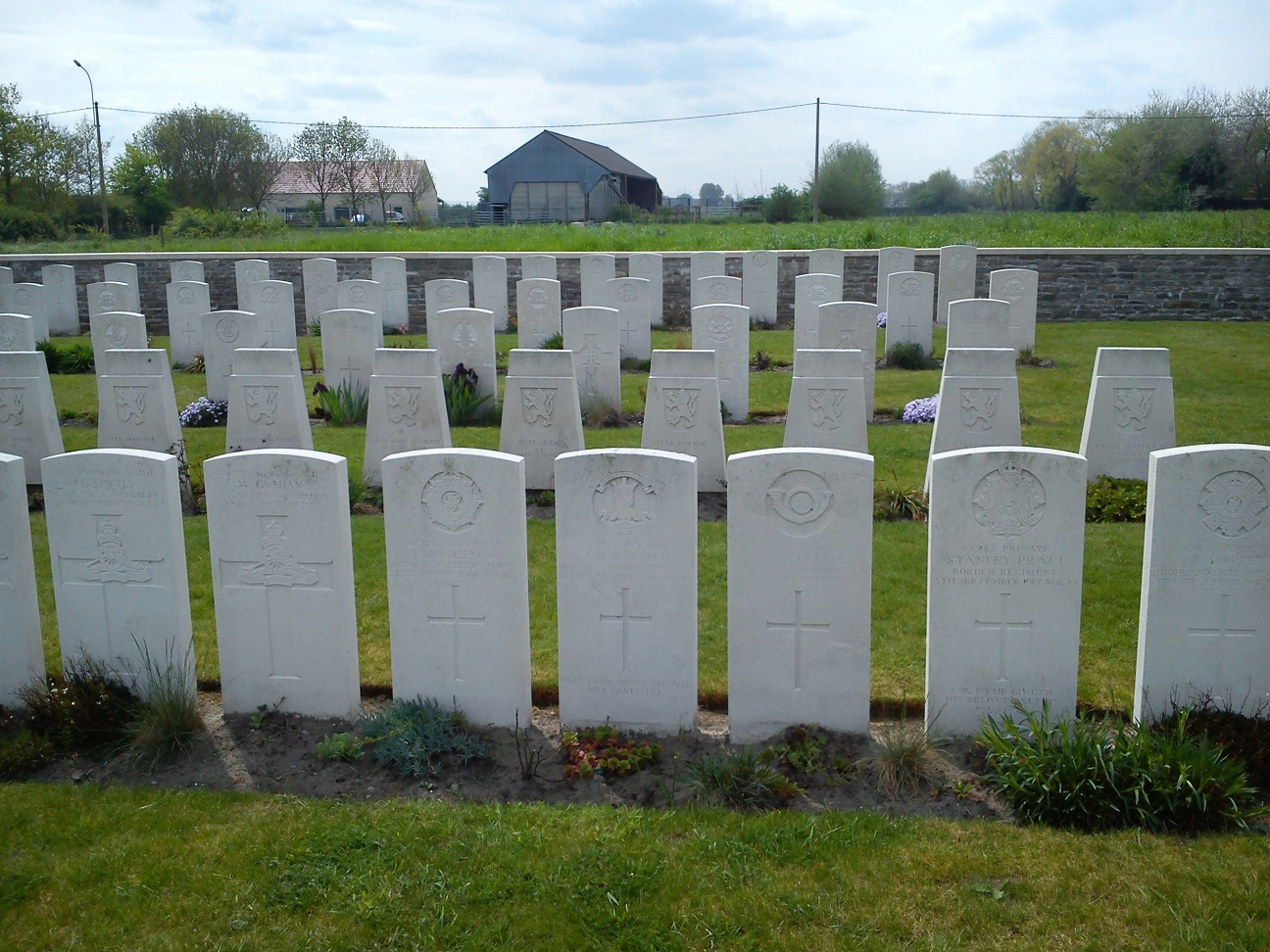

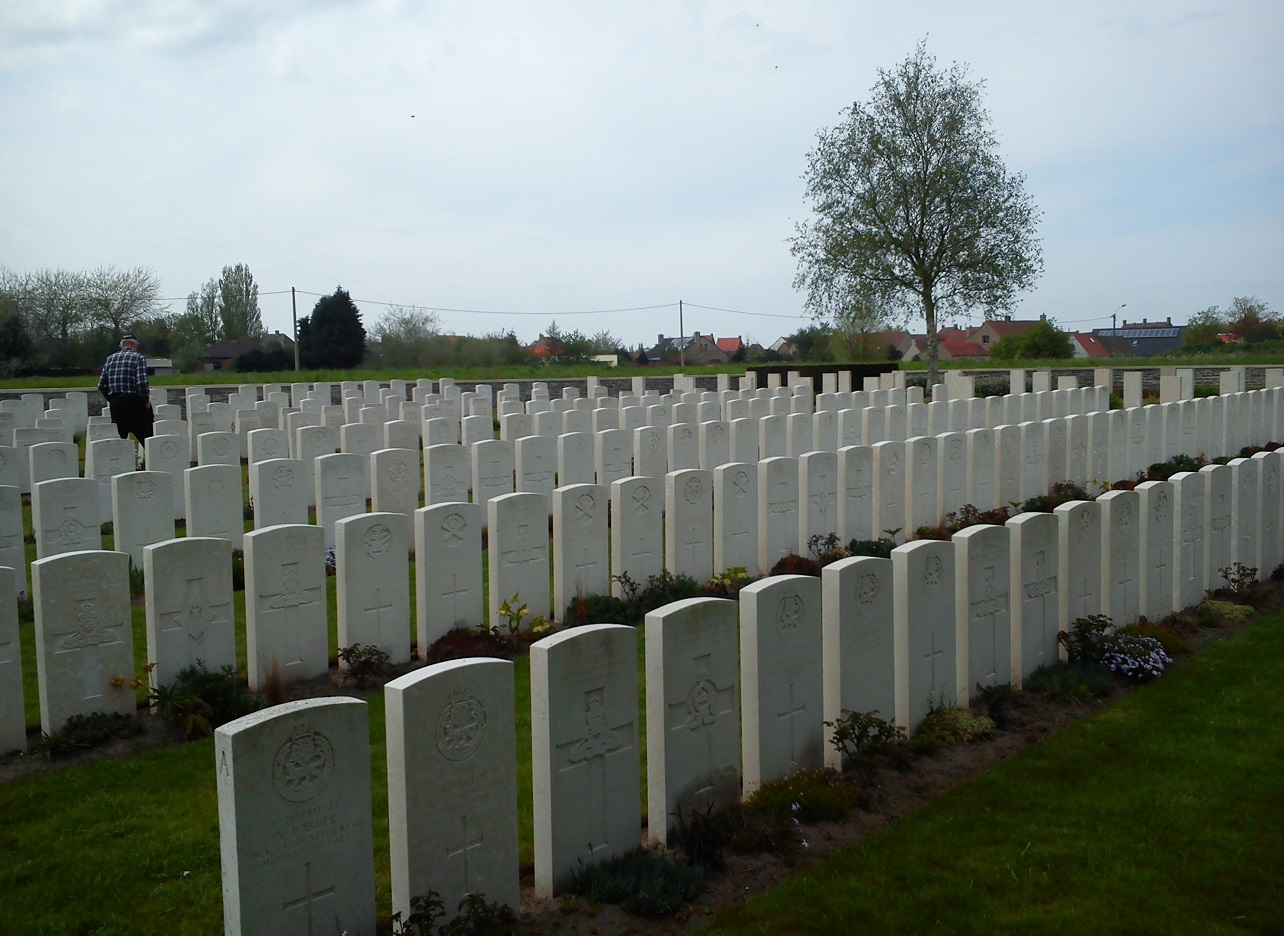

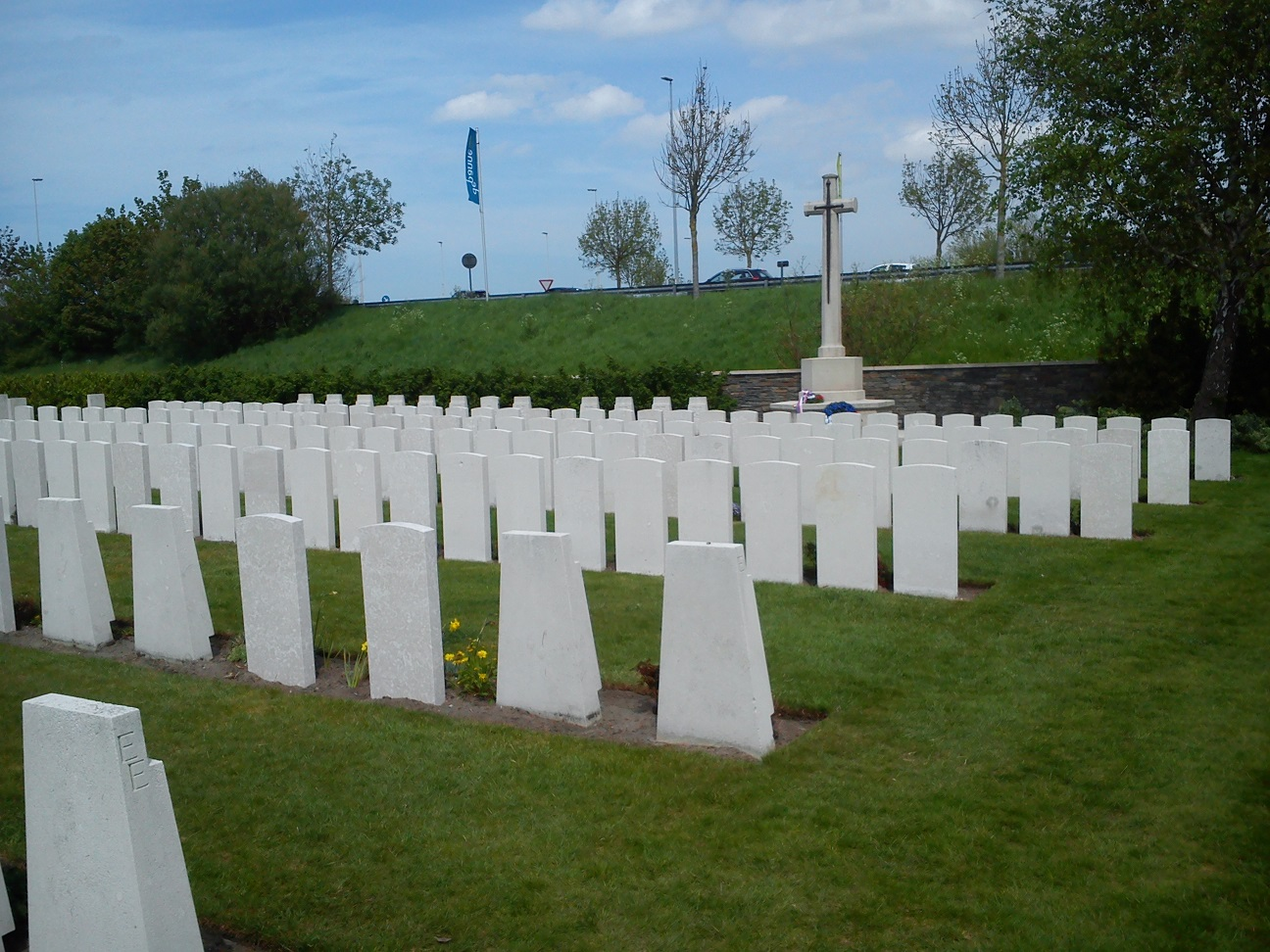

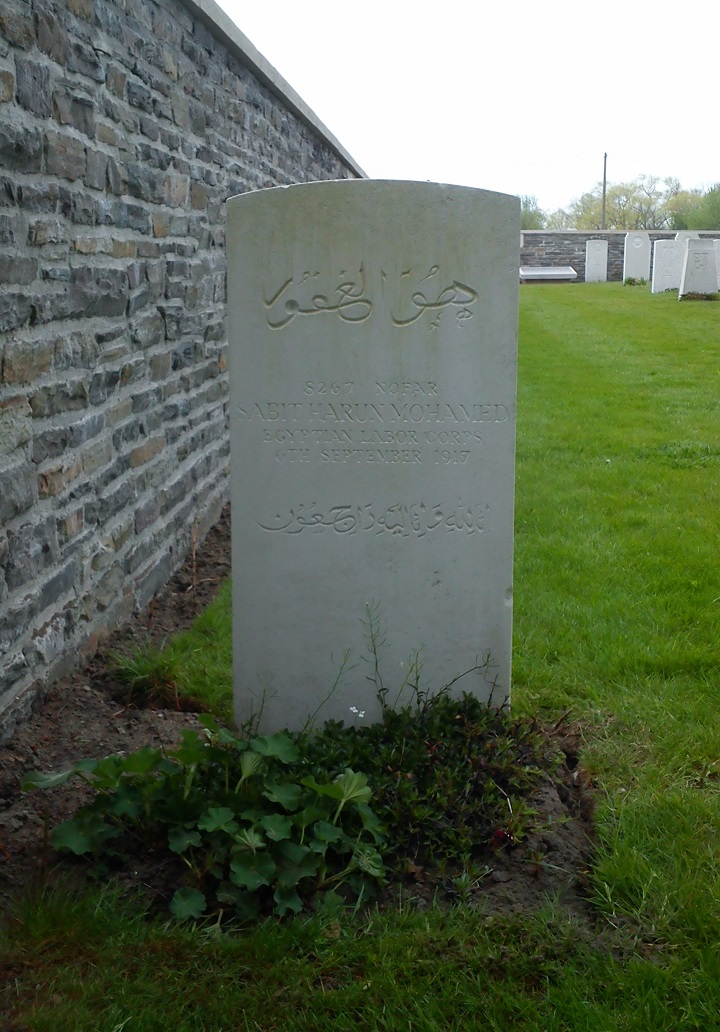

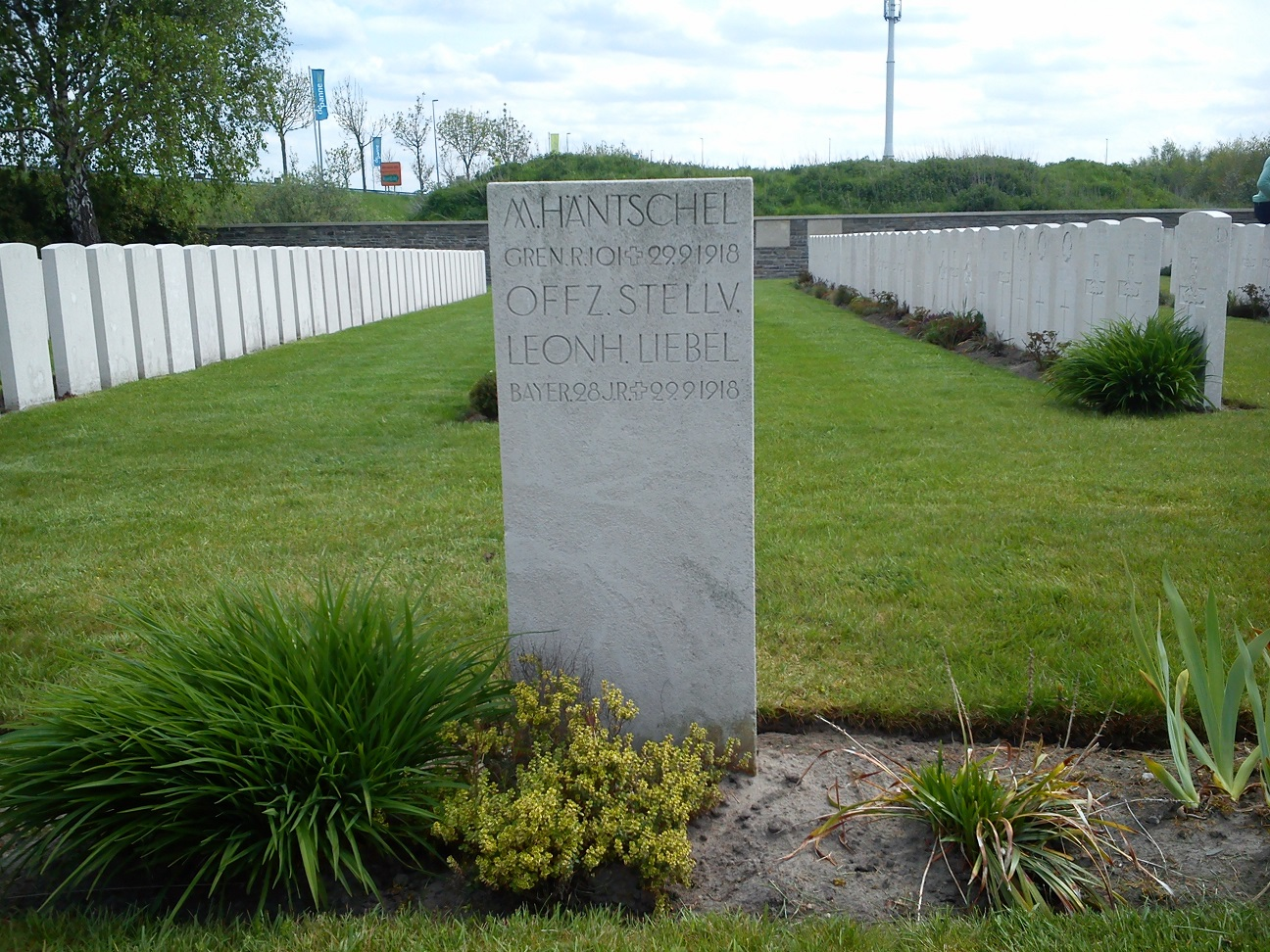

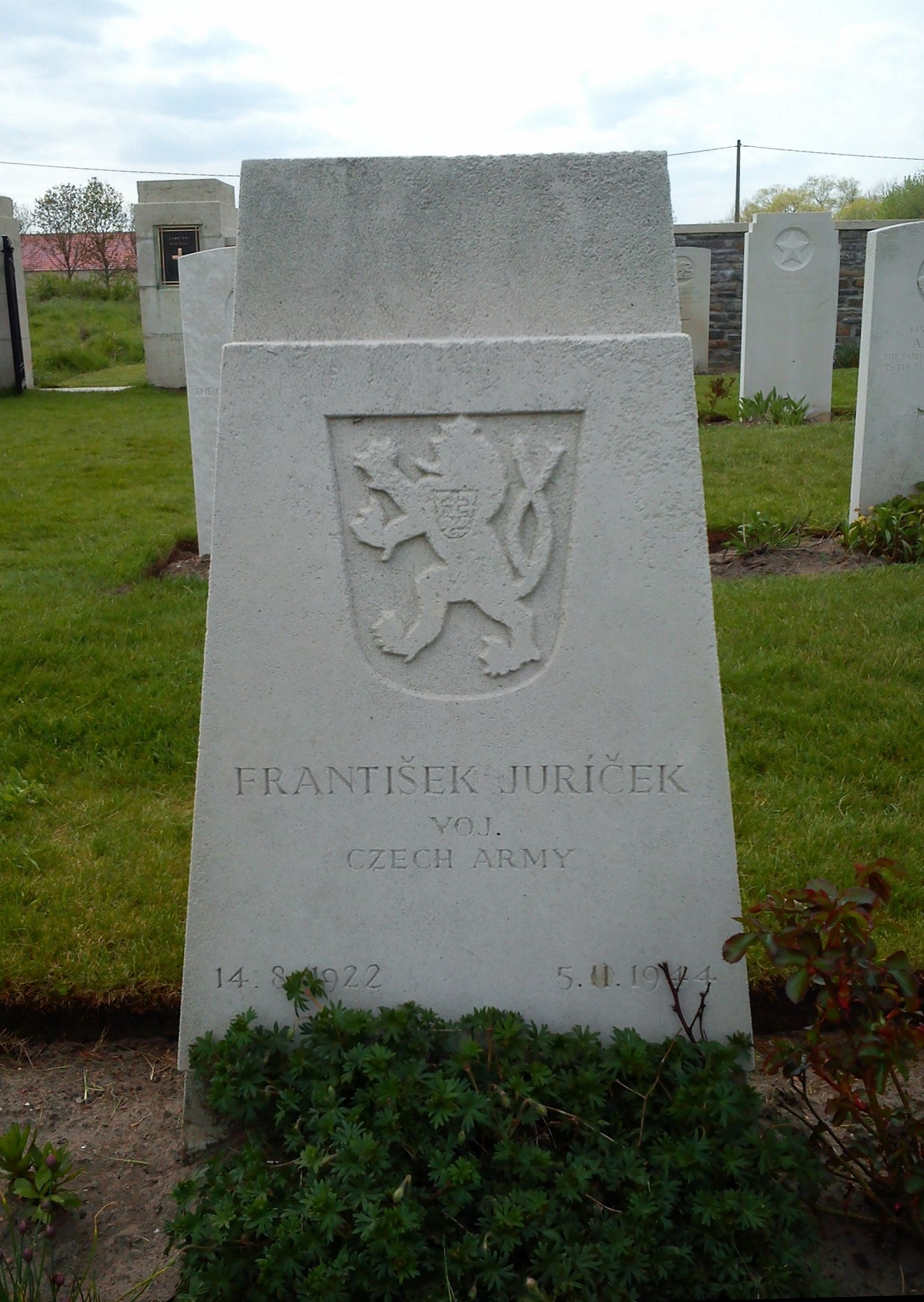

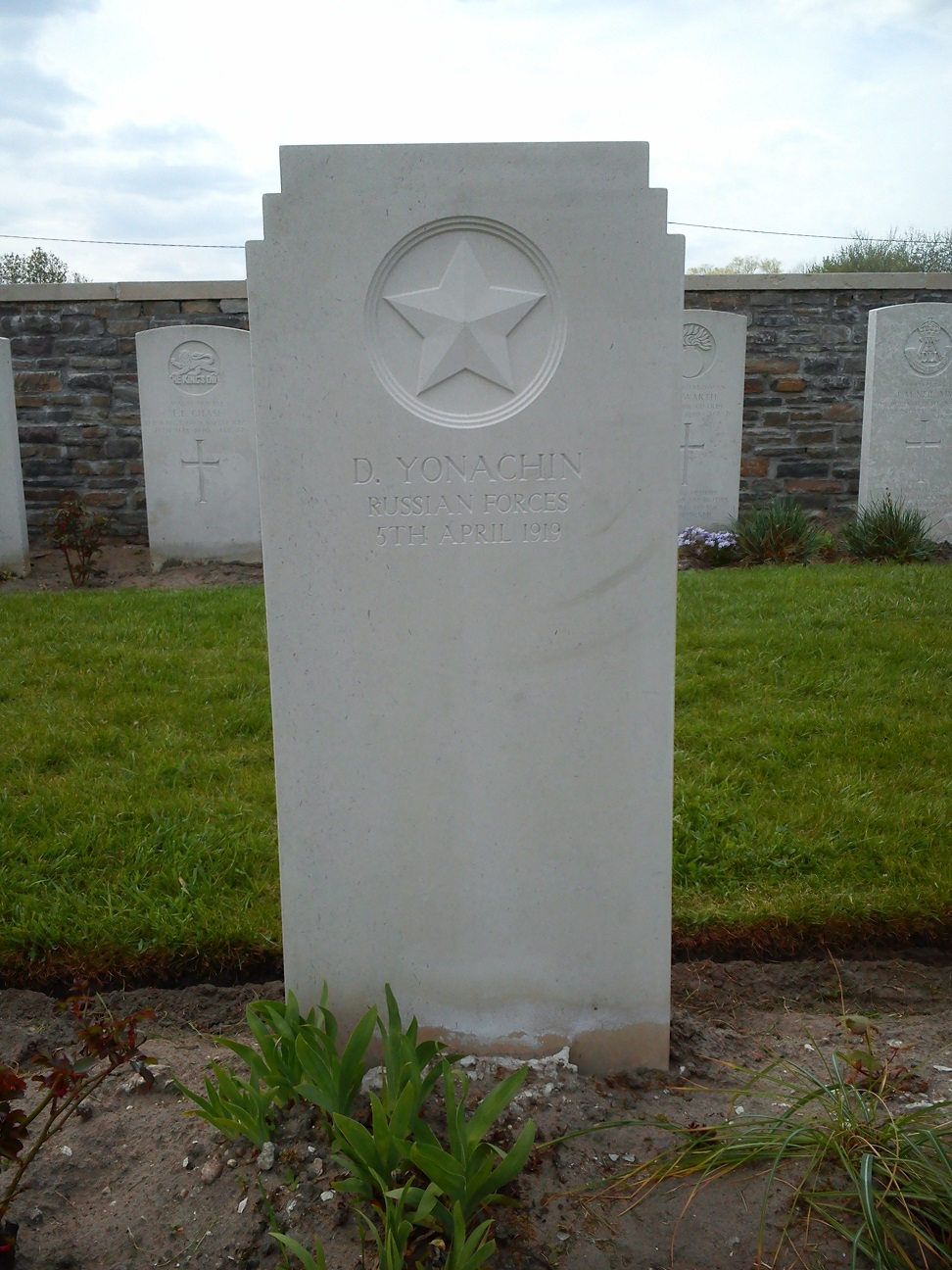
