= Harbourne Stephen =

British flying ace

Harbourne Mackay Stephen
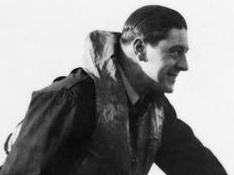
- Born: 18 April 1916; Elgin, Scotland
- Died: 20 August 2001 (aged 85); London, United Kingdom
- Military career
- Allegiance: United Kingdom
- Branch: Royal Air Force Volunteer Reserve
- Rank: Wing Commander
- Commands: No. 166 Wing; No. 602 Squadron; No. 234 Squadron
- Conflicts: Second World War: Evacuation from Dunkirk; Battle of Britain; Channel Front; Burma campaign
- Awards: Commander of the Order of the British Empire (Civil division); Distinguished Service Order; Distinguished Flying Cross & Bar; Mention in despatches Air Efficiency Award
- Other work: Newspaperman

Harbourne Mackay Stephen CBE, DSO, DFC*, AE (18 April 1916 – 20 August 2001) was a British flying ace of the Royal Air Force Volunteer Reserve (RAFVR) during the Second World War. He was credited with the sole destruction of at least nine aircraft of the Axis powers.

Born in Elgin, Scotland, Stephen joined the RAFVR in 1937. Called up for service in the Royal Air Force (RAF) on the outbreak of the Second World War, he was posted first to No. 605 Squadron and then, following being commissioned a pilot officer, No. 74 Squadron. He flew extensively during the evacuation from Dunkirk and then the Battle of Britain, during which he destroyed at least four German aircraft. He was twice awarded the Distinguished Flying Cross during the Battle of Britain and at the end of 1940 was awarded the Distinguished Service Order.

From early- to mid-1941 he performed instructing duties and was then posted to No. 234 Squadron and participated in several offensive operations, attacking radar sites in France. He achieved his last aerial victory in October. Following the entry of the Empire of Japan into the war, he was sent to the Far East where he commanded No. 166 Wing and later served in a series of staff postings. After the war he chose to not pursue a career in the RAF and instead returned to his pre-war occupation as a newspaperman. Managing a number of newspaper titles for the next several years, he was made a Commander of the Order of the British Empire in 1985 for his services to the profession.

== Early life ==
Born in Elgin, Scotland, on 18 April 1916, Harbourne Mackay Stephen was the son of Thomas Stephen, who was a bank manager and justice of the peace. He was initially educated privately, by a governess, but then went to schools in Edinburgh and later at Shrewsbury School in Shropshire. He finished his schooling when he was 15-years-old and soon afterwards went to London to work in the newspaper industry.

Stephen initially worked as a copy boy for Allied Newspapers but in 1936 began working in advertising for the Evening Standard. In April the following year he joined the Royal Air Force Volunteer Reserve (RAFVR). His initial flight training was completed at No. 13 Elementary and Reserve Flying Training School and once he had gained the requisite flight hours, he took a six-month sabbatical from his job for training with the Royal Air Force (RAF). His course finished just on the outbreak of the Second World War in September 1939.

== Second World War ==
Called up for service in the RAF, Stephen was sent for further training at No. 11 Group Fighter Pool, at St Athan in Wales, gaining experience on the Hawker Hurricane fighter aircraft. He was then posted to No. 605 Squadron, at the time based at Tangmere, as a sergeant pilot. The squadron saw no action until 28 March 1940, when it intercepted a Heinkel He 111 medium bomber; Stephen's section leader engaged it but without success. The bomber was subsequently located and destroyed by pilots of No. 43 Squadron.

=== Evacuation from Dunkirk ===
On 1 April Stephen was commissioned as a pilot officer, although on probation, and transferred to No. 74 Squadron, which operated Supermarine Spitfire fighters. His new posting was based at Hornchurch and he flew extensively during the evacuation from Dunkirk. On 24 May he helped shoot down a Henschel Hs 126 reconnaissance aircraft near Dunkirk and was also involved in the destruction of a Dornier Do 17 bomber near Calais. Two days later, he shared in the destruction of another Hs 126, although this was not confirmed. On 27 May, about 5 miles (8.0 km) from Dunkirk, he shot down a Messerschmitt Bf 109 fighter, and then, near Boulogne, helped destroy a Do 17.

=== Battle of Britain ===
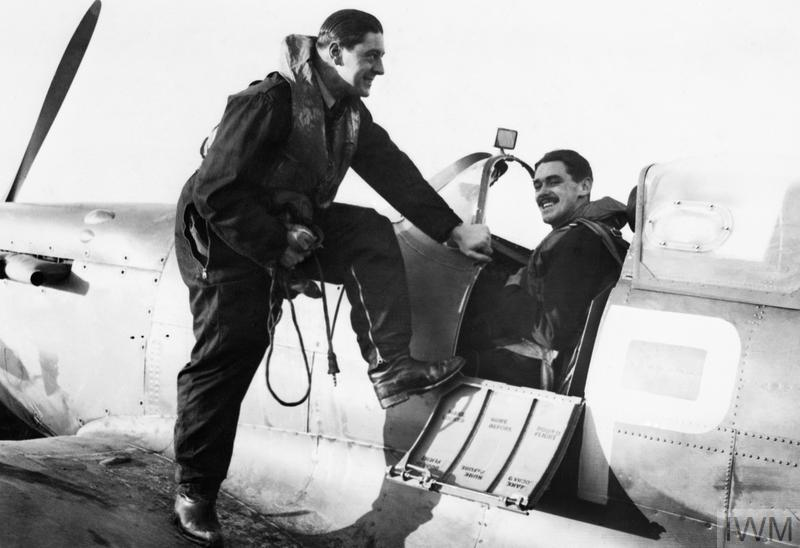
Stephen and fellow flying ace John Mungo-Park (seated in Spitfire), both of No. 74 Squadron, Biggin Hill, 30 November 1940

As part of No. 11 Group, No. 74 Squadron was heavily engaged once the Battle of Britain commenced in July. Stephen's first claim in the battle was on 28 July, for a damaged Bf 109. On 11 August, while flying over Dover, he destroyed one Bf 109, damaged another, and also damaged a Messerschmitt Bf 110 heavy fighter, all of which were confirmed. He also claimed two Bf 109s and two Bf 110s but these were unable to be verified. He engaged a Do 17 over the Thames Estuary on 13 August, claiming it as probably destroyed. The squadron was moved to No. 12 Group for a rest period in mid-August and two weeks later Stephen was awarded the Distinguished Flying Cross (DFC). The published citation for his DFC read:

Since May, 1940, Pilot Officer Stephen has flown continuously with his squadron on offensive patrols, and taken part in numerous engagements against the enemy throughout the Dunkirk operations. He has also been engaged protecting shipping in the Channel and has taken part in intensive air operations over the Kentish coast. During one day in August, in company with his squadron, Pilot Officer Stephen participated in four successive combats against large formations of enemy aircraft over the Thames Estuary and Channel and during these engagements he shot down five enemy aircraft. He has now destroyed a total of twelve enemy aircraft and has always displayed great coolness and determination in pressing home his attacks against the enemy.

— The London Gazette, No. 34932, 27 August 1940

No. 74 Squadron returned to duty with No. 11 Group in September, based at Coltishall. Stephen continued his run of success against the Luftwaffe, destroying a Junkers Ju 88 bomber and damaging a Bf 109 over London on 11 September. At the start of the following month, he damaged a He 111 near Cromer, in Norfolk, and then on 5 October shared in the destruction of a Do 17 30 miles (48 km) from Harwich. By this time the squadron was equipped with the updated Spitfire Mark II and was operating from Biggin Hill and Stephen destroyed a Bf 109 on 20 October, which was confirmed, and also probably destroyed another. A week later he destroyed another Bf 109. On 14 November, flying over Dover, he engaged and shot down three Junkers Ju 87 dive bombers. The next day, he damaged a Bf 109. It was also announced in The London Gazette that he had been awarded a bar to his DFC; the published citation read:

One day in October, 1940, this officer was on patrol with his squadron when enemy fighters were sighted and attacked. Pilot Officer Stephen fought four Messerschmitt 109s at 29,000 feet, causing the tail of one to break off, and destroying a second. He has destroyed at least 13 enemy aircraft, and his courage and skill as a fighter pilot have been a great incentive to other pilots in his squadron.

— The London Gazette, No. 34993, 15 November 1940

On 17 November Stephen shared in the destruction of a Bf 109 near Brighton and at the end of the month again shared in the shooting down of a Bf 109, this time near the Thames Estuary. This was the 600th aerial victory for squadrons flying from Biggin Hill, which he shared with fellow flying ace John Mungo-Park. At the start of the following month, he claimed a Bf 109 as probably destroyed and this was followed on 5 December with a confirmed Bf 109 destroyed plus a share in another Bf 109 shot down. On 24 December, he was awarded the Distinguished Service Order (DSO), the first immediate award of this decoration of the war. It was the third gallantry award made to Stephen in just six months. The citation for the DSO, as published in The London Gazette, read:

One day in November, 1940, Pilot Officer Stephen led a section of his squadron in an attack against, an escorted formation of enemy bombers, three of which he destroyed. Later in the month, he undertook a voluntary patrol in company with his flight commander and destroyed a Messerschmitt 109. This success brought the number of aircraft destroyed by members of his home station to the magnificent total of 600, and, at the same time, increased his own score to nineteen. His exceptional courage and skill have greatly enhanced the fine spirit shown by his squadron.

— The London Gazette, No. 35022, 24 December 1940

=== Later war service ===
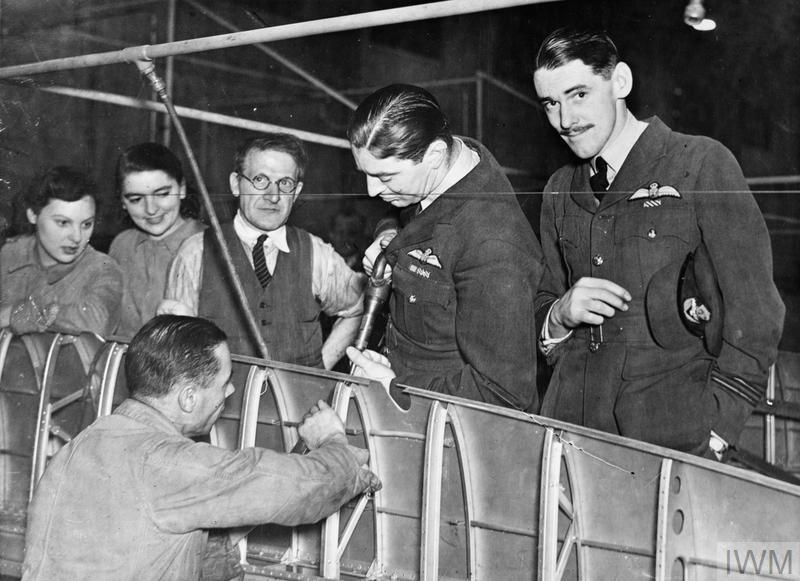
Stephen, centre with a rivet gun, and Mungo-Park (right) while on a visit to an aircraft factory, December 1940

Taken off operational flying on 11 January 1941, Stephen was posted to No. 59 Operational Training Unit at Edinburgh as its chief flying instructor. However this was short-lived for he was seconded to the Royal Aircraft Establishment at Farnborough. He was mentioned in despatches on 17 March and then, on 1 April, his probationary status as a pilot officer confirmed, he was promoted to flying officer.

In June Stephen returned to operations at Portreath, posted to the newly formed No. 130 Squadron but late the following month was sent to No. 234 Squadron as its commander. At the time, the squadron was based at Warmwell in Dorset and was regularly flying to France to attack radar sites and carrying out protective convoy patrols. Flying a Spitfire Mark Vb, he damaged a Ju 88 on 12 August near Antwerp. On 15 October, he, along with another pilot, shared in the destruction of a Bf 109 near Le Havre. He was promoted to flight lieutenant in November.

In early 1942, following the entry of the Empire of Japan into the war, Stephen was posted to the Far East. He served as a wing leader at Dum Dum, in Calcutta, and later at Jessore. On 14 July, he was promoted to squadron leader. He was then given command of No. 166 Wing, operating from Chittagong in the Burma campaign. A recipient of the Air Efficiency Award in 1943, he subsequently held staff postings at the headquarters of No. 224 Group and Air Command South East Asia.

By the end of the war, Stephen held the rank of wing commander. He had been credited with nine aerial victories plus eight more shared with other pilots. He also claimed four more aerial victories as destroyed, but these were unconfirmed. He was also credited with three German aircraft probably destroyed, and seven more damaged.

== Later life ==
Offered a permanent commission in the RAF after the war Stephen declined, preferring to return to the newspaper industry. He took up a managerial role at the Scottish Daily Express, the Scottish Sunday Express and the Evening Citizen, based in Glasgow. He resumed a part-time career with the RAFVR when in September 1950, he received an emergency commission as wing commander for appointment to the Royal Auxiliary Air Force to command No. 602 (City of Glasgow) Squadron. He remained its commander until 1952.

In 1956, Stephen became the general manager of the Sunday Express and the Sunday Graphic, both part of Lord Beaverbrook's newspaper publishing empire. Three years later he began working for the Kemsley Newspapers Group when he became manager of The Sunday Times and under his stewardship, the newspaper introduced a colour supplement. In 1963 he became managing director at The Daily Telegraph. In the 1985 Queen's Birthday Honours, Stephen was appointed a Commander in the Civil division of the Order of the British Empire for "services to the newspaper industry".

Interested in charitable work, Stephen helped to found the Raleigh International charity, which provided young people with the opportunity to become involved in environmental and community works. He was also on the Council of the Royal Society for the Protection of Birds and the Scientific Exploration Society. He died in London on 20 August 2001, survived by his wife Erica and two children.
