= Adinkerke =

Village in Flemish Community, Belgium

Coordinates: 51°04′N 2°36′E

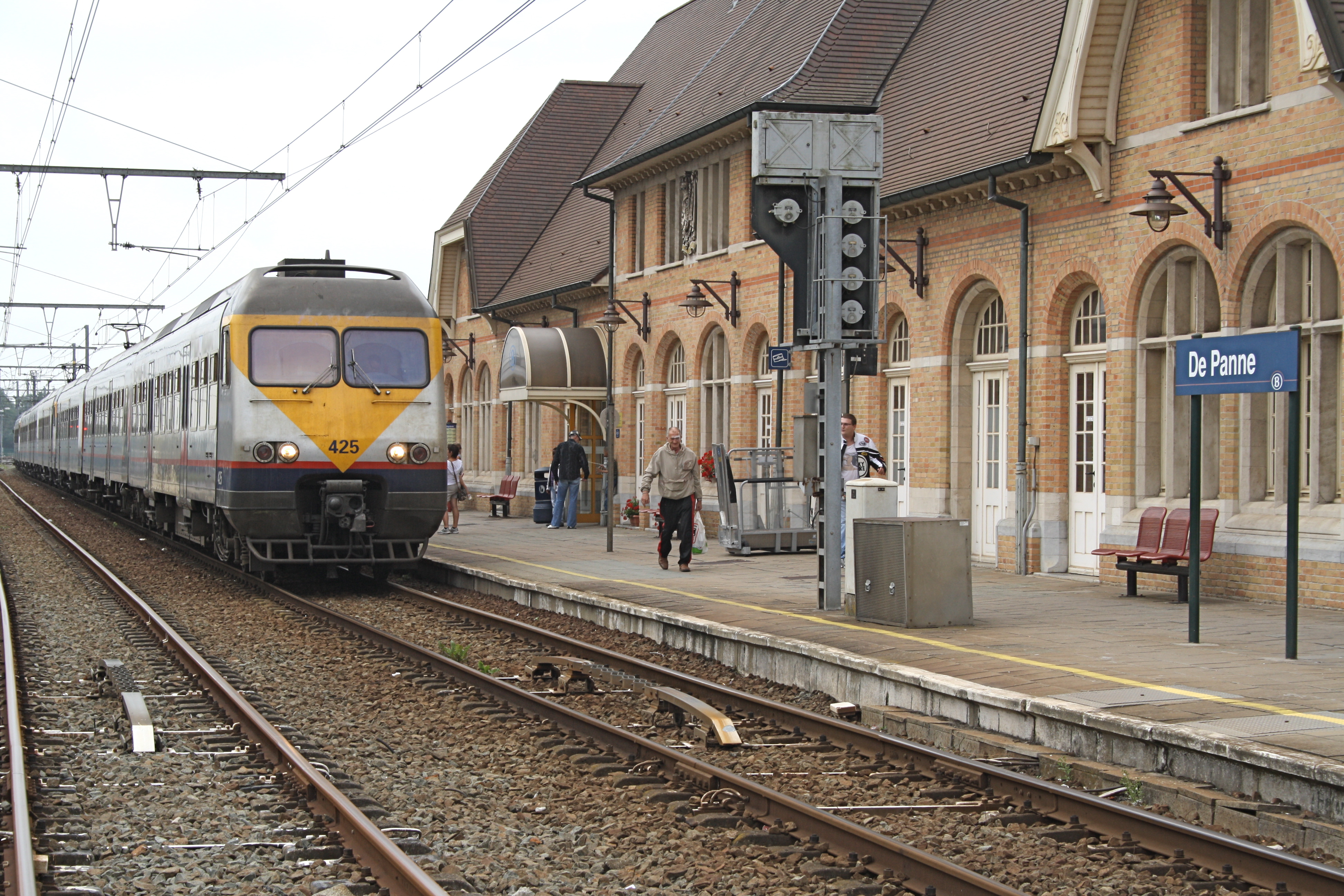
De Panne station in Adinkerke

Adinkerke (French: Adinkerque) is a village in the municipality of De Panne in western Belgium close to the French border. It forms a conurbation with the coastal town of De Panne, which in turn is part of the west Belgian coastal conurbation. Adinkerke railway station is also the western terminus of the Belgian coast tram line to De Panne; Nieuwpoort, Ostend and beyond. Near the city is Plopsaland, formerly Meli Park.

The 'kerke' suffix is common in west Flanders as an area surrounding a church (similar to kirk in Scotland and North East England). The closest French towns are Ghyvelde and Bray-Dunes, which can be accessed via the E40 (A16) motorway, N39 (N1) main road, or N386 (D 60) minor road in addition to a canal. The roads names in brackets employ French nomenclature once crossing the border.

There are regular NMBS trains to Brussels. Access by train to Dunkirk is via Gare de Lille Flandres which is in France. The line across the border is out of use. Dk' bus run buses from the station forecourt to Gare de Dunkerque. A campaign group called Trekhaak-73 is seeking to re-open the railway line.

== History ==
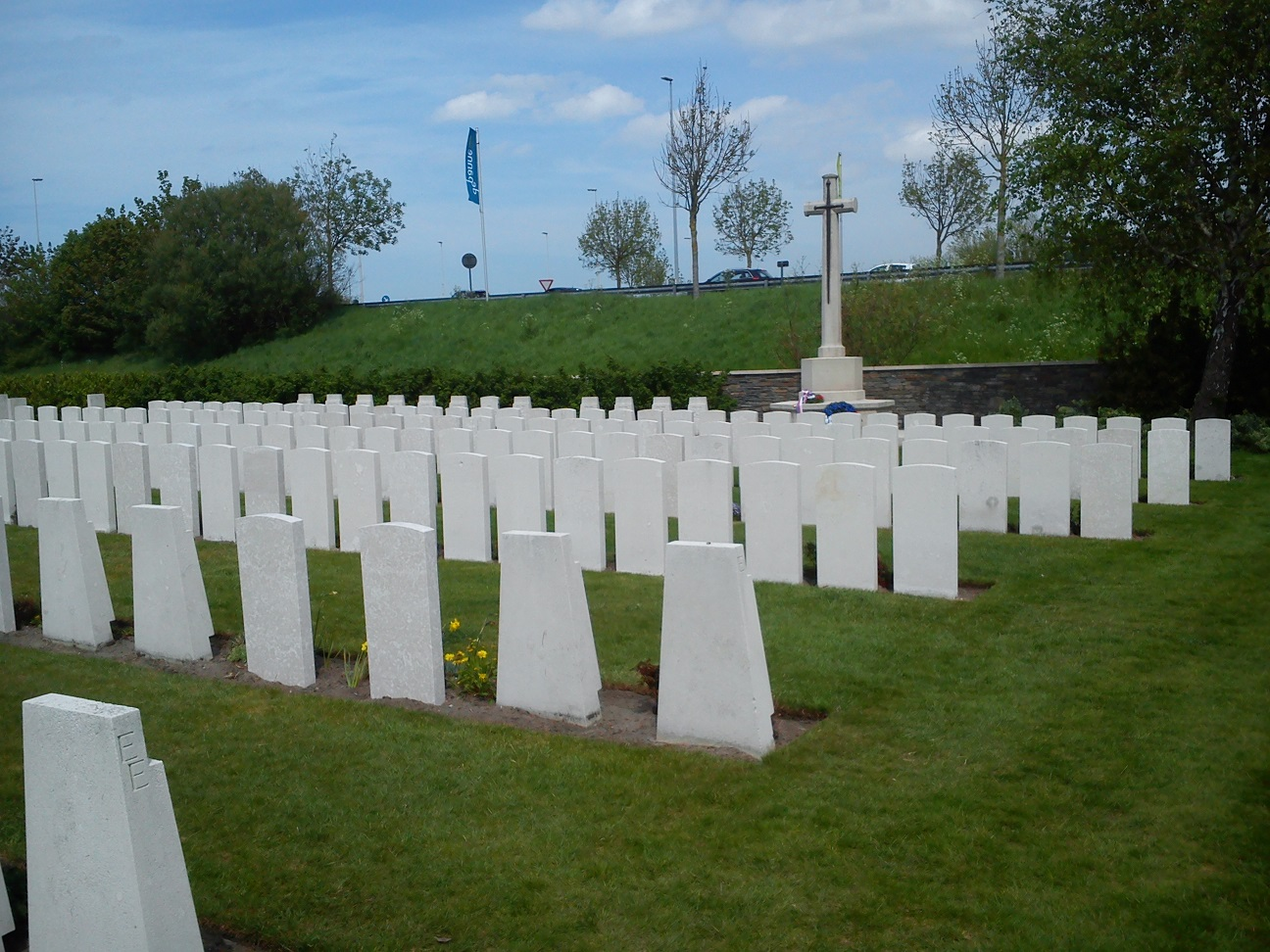
Adinkerke Military Cemetery

In the First World War, from June to November 1917 the Commonwealth XV Corps held the front from the Belgian coast to St. Georges. The 24th and 39th Casualty Clearing Stations were posted at Oosthoek (between Adinkerke and Veurne) from July to November, and the 1st Canadian Casualty Clearing Station was at Adinkerke for a short time in June and July.

During the Second World War, the British Expeditionary Force was involved in the later stages of the defence of Belgium following the German invasion in May 1940, and suffered many casualties in covering the withdrawal to Dunkirk. Commonwealth forces did not return until September 1944, but in the intervening years, many airmen were shot down or crashed in raids on strategic objectives in Belgium, or while returning from missions over Germany.

Adinkerke Military Cemetery contains 365 burials (168 Commonwealth dead of the First World War, 55 from the Second World War, also 142 Czech, Slovak and German war graves). Further Commonwealth War Graves Commission (CWGC) graves can be found in the Adinkerke Churchyard Extension, which contains a Belgian military cemetery as well as 67 Commonwealth burials.

== Tobacco ==
Belgium has lower taxes on tobacco than France or the UK; as Adinkerke is the closest Belgian town accessible to the French ferry ports, it attracts many French smokers and British booze cruisers every day to make the trip across the border to buy cheaper tobacco. Adinkerke has the claim to fame of having the greatest number of tobacconists per capita of any area in Europe.

Previously, tobacconists were open around the clock, which provided the advantage of offering other commercial and fuel services that would not normally be found in a town of such a small size. While this may have proved beneficial to travellers, local people were inconvenienced by the constant traffic, so the local mayor ordered the tobacco stores to close during the night. Due to the smuggling associated with reduced tobacco duty, it is not uncommon for the E40 to be closed at night at junction 1 and French and Belgian police to question drivers and passengers of vehicles on the N34 road over the motorway.

A weak euro combined with increasingly expensive tobacco prices has resulted in more and more UK shoppers to make the day trip to Adinkerke to stock up on cheap tobacco. Tax increases have made the UK the second most expensive place to buy tobacco in Europe. Adinkerke tobacco shops cater to English shoppers, selling popular UK brands and accepting payment in sterling.
