= De Panne =

De Panne: La Panne (French)
- Municipality
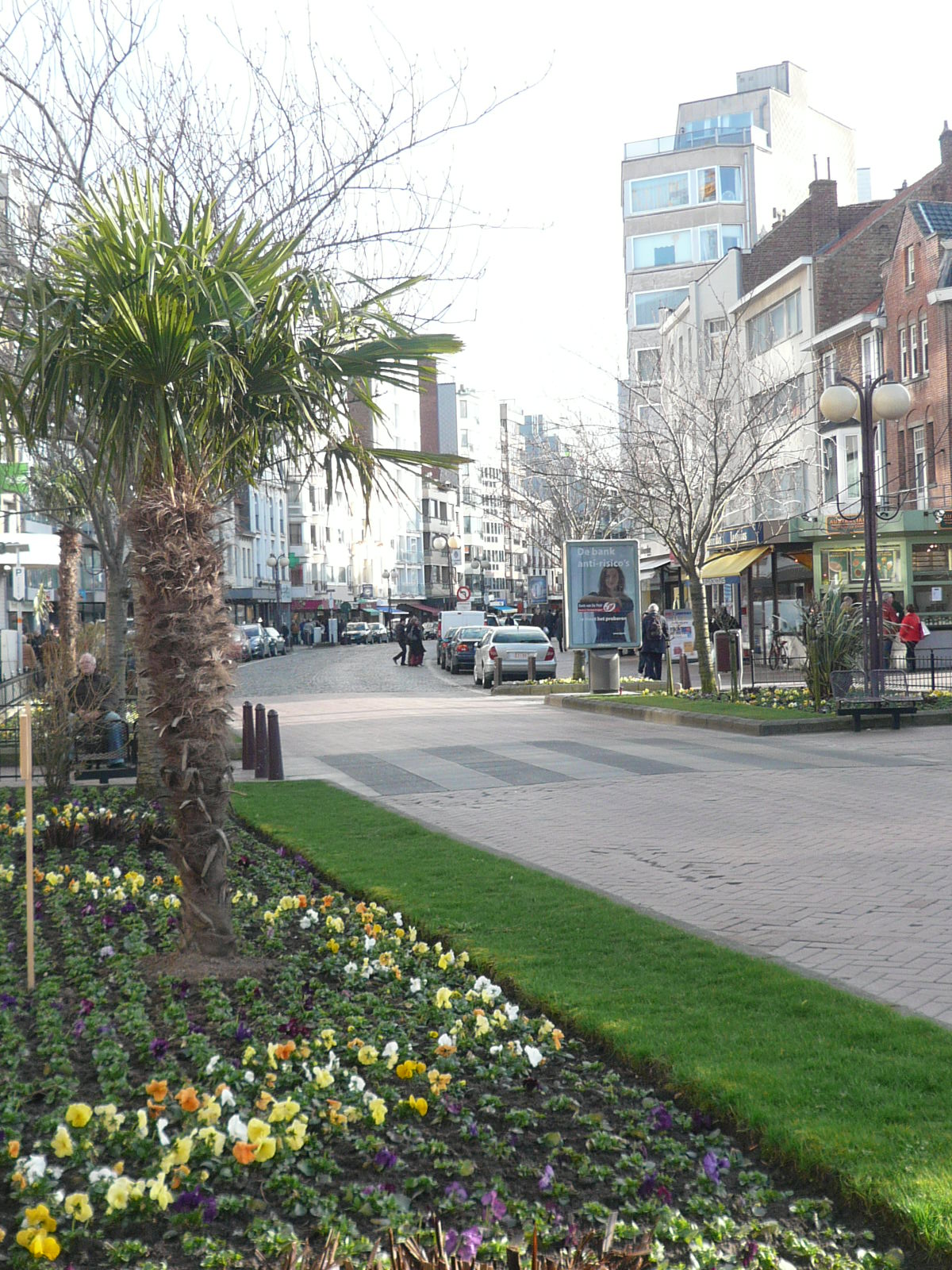
- De Panne town centre view

- Flag Coat of arms

- Location of De Panne in West Flanders
- Interactive map of De Panne
- Location in Belgium
- Coordinates: 51°06′N 02°35′E
- Country: Belgium
- Community: Flemish Community
- Region: Flemish Region
- Province: West Flanders
- Arrondissement: Veurne

Government
  - Mayor: Bram Degrieck (Het Plan - B)
  - Governing parties: Het Plan -B, ACTIE, N-VA

Area
  - Total: 26.63 km^{2} (10.28 sq mi)
- Elevation: 4.0 m (13 ft)

Population (2018-01-01)
  - Total: 11,129
  - Density: 417.9/km^{2} (1,082/sq mi)
- Time zone: UTC+01:00 (CET)
  - Summer (DST): UTC+02:00 (CEST)
- Postal codes: 8660
- NIS code: 38008
- Area codes: 058
- Website: www.depanne.be

De Panne (Dutch pronunciation: [də ˈpɑnə]; French: La Panne [la pan]) is a town and a municipality located on the North Sea coast of the Belgian province of West Flanders. There it borders France, making it the westernmost town in Belgium. It is one of the most popular resort town destinations within Belgium. The municipality includes the village of Adinkerke. On 1 January 2011, De Panne had a total population of 10,748 on a total area of 23.90 km^{2}, which gives a population density of 449.7 inhabitants per km^{2}.

== Miscellaneous ==
Famous people who have lived or died in De Panne include King Albert I and Queen Elisabeth, and John Aidan Liddell, VC, who died in De Panne in August 1915. The Belgian royal family lived in De Panne during the First World War because it was located in the tiny fraction of their country that was not conquered by the Germans.

De Panne is home to Plopsaland, a theme park aimed at young children and located on the former grounds of Meli Park. De Panne was also the place where the first land yachts intended for sport were built and used by the Dumont brothers in 1898. On 17 July 1831, Leopold I, the first Belgian king, sailed to Calais from England, and arrived in Belgium in De Panne. The Leopold I Esplanade, which includes a statue of him, commemorates his arrival.

Since 1977, the town has hosted the Three Days of De Panne cycle race, which is held in the run up to, and traditionally used by riders as preparation for the Tour of Flanders.

De Panne was the site of a Belgium-England undersea telephone line laid by Siemens before the war, and therefore was used as Gort's headquarters for the evacuation of nearby Dunkirk to allow contact with England.

== Transport ==
De Panne Railway Station is located in nearby Adinkerke. There are regular NMBS trains to Brussels. The line across the border to Dunkirk is out of use. DK Bus run buses from the station forecourt to Gare de Dunkerque. A cross-border campaign group Trekhaak-73 is seeking to re-open the railway line.

== Belgian Military Cemetery of De Panne ==
The cemetery is located at Kerkstraat 69 in De Panne, 1 km south of the church. Besides Belgian soldiers who died in the First World War there are also British soldiers who died in the Second World War. 3,744 soldiers have been buried here. Nearby is Adinkerke Military Cemetery.

== Images ==
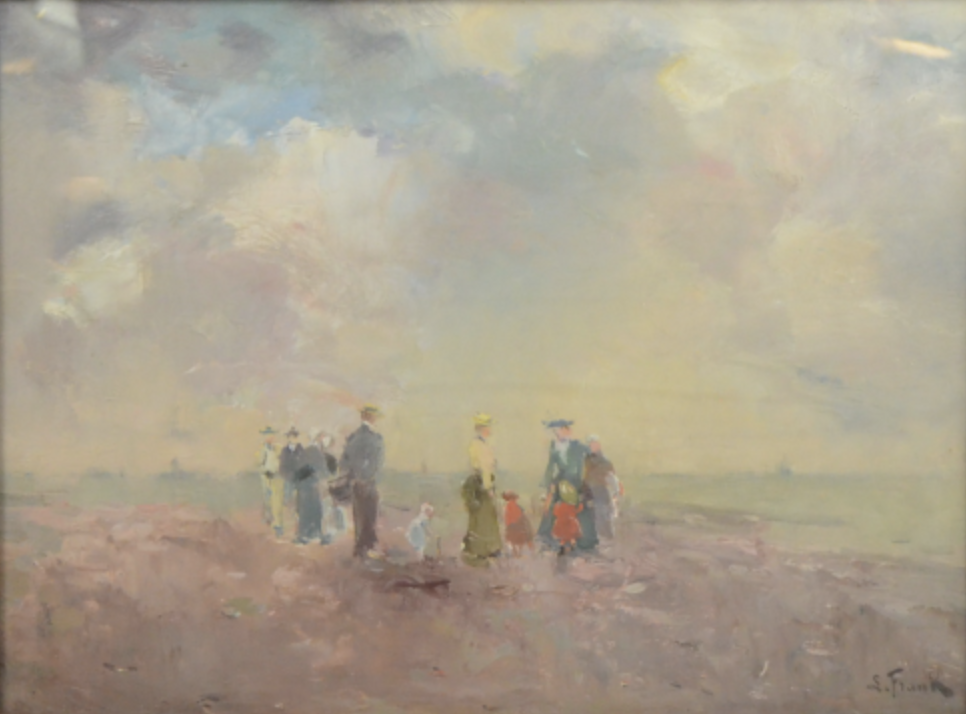
Lucien Frank, The Royal Family at De Panne, by 1920.

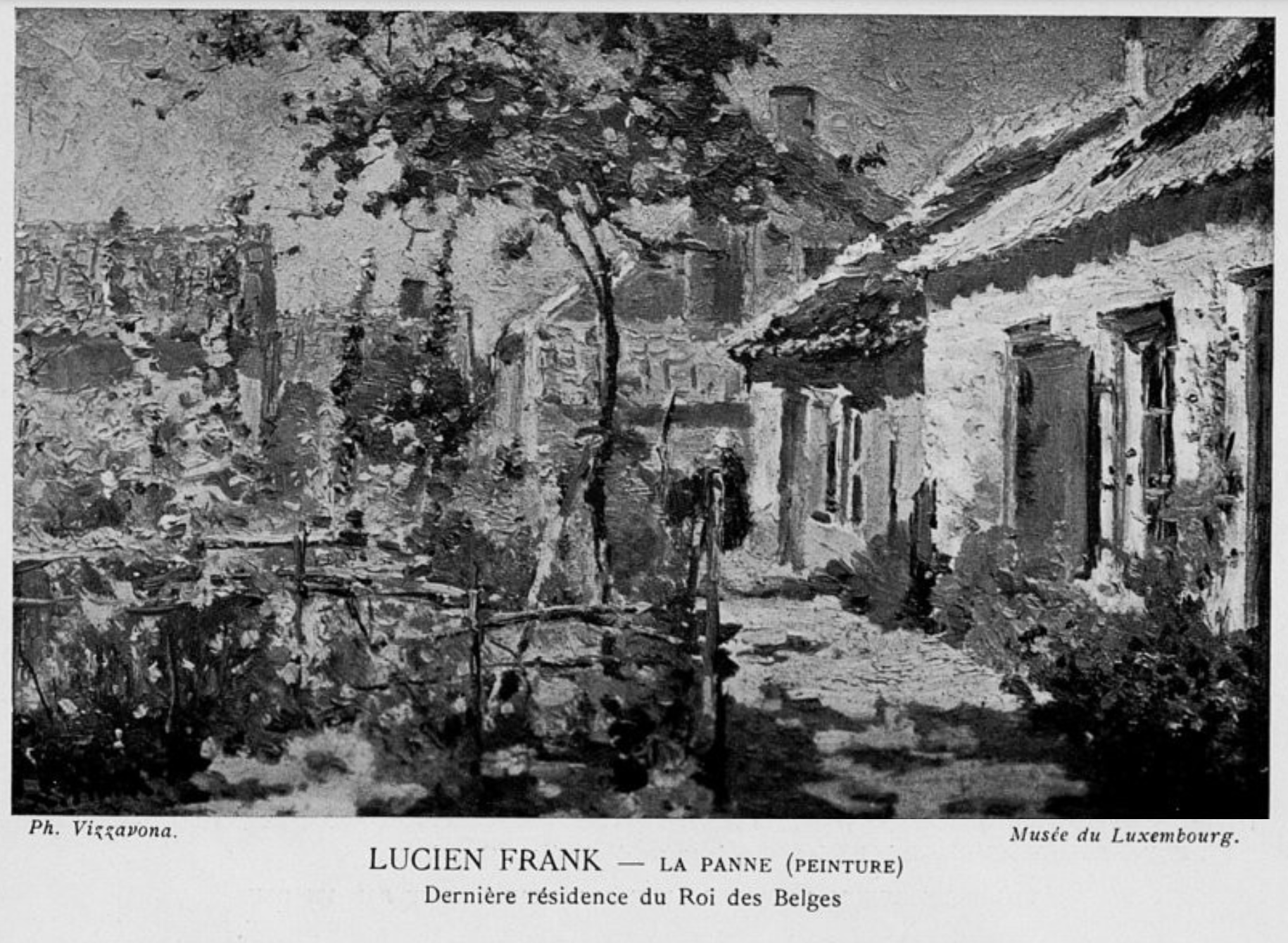
Lucien Frank, Residence of King Albert I during WW I, 1915.

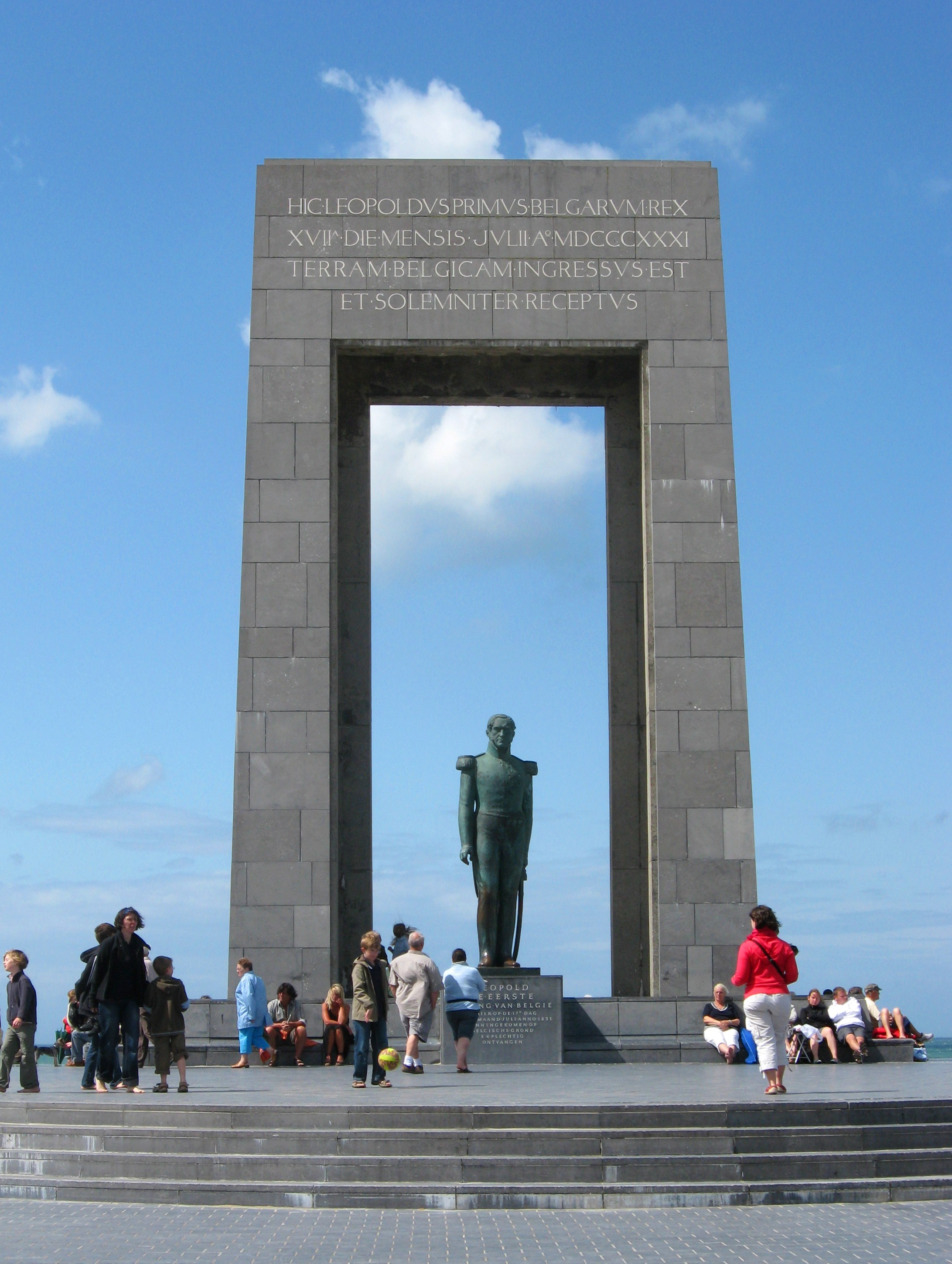
Monument to King Leopold I

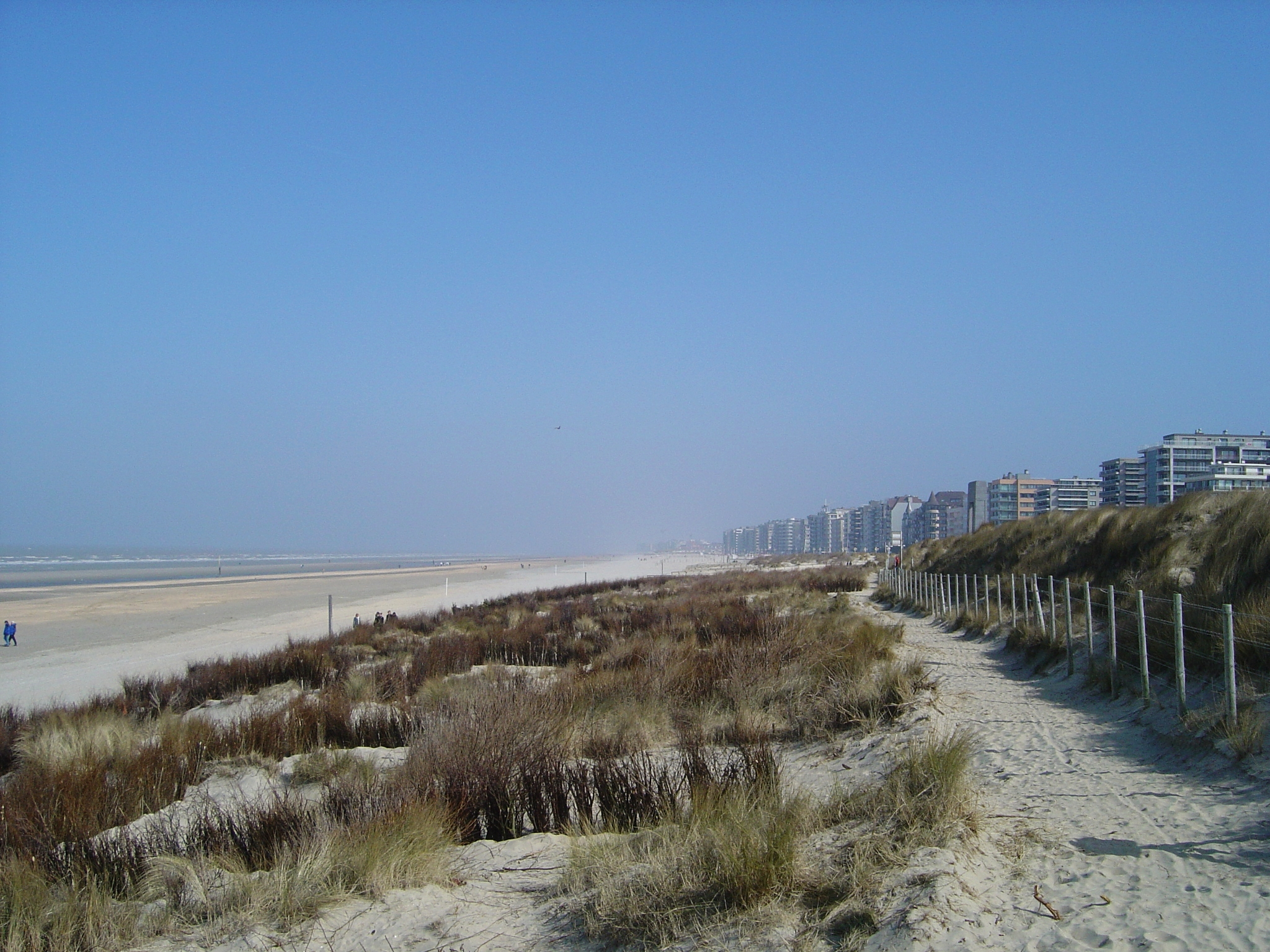
Beach and apartment buildings

== Climate ==
Climate data for De Panne (1991−2020 normals)
Month	Jan	Feb	Mar	Apr	May	Jun	Jul	Aug	Sep	Oct	Nov	Dec	Year
Mean daily maximum °C (°F)	7.1 (44.8)	7.9 (46.2)	10.7 (51.3)	14.0 (57.2)	17.0 (62.6)	19.7 (67.5)	21.9 (71.4)	22.3 (72.1)	19.5 (67.1)	15.4 (59.7)	10.8 (51.4)	7.7 (45.9)	14.5 (58.1)
Daily mean °C (°F)	4.4 (39.9)	4.7 (40.5)	6.8 (44.2)	9.5 (49.1)	12.8 (55.0)	15.5 (59.9)	17.6 (63.7)	17.7 (63.9)	15.1 (59.2)	11.6 (52.9)	7.8 (46.0)	5.0 (41.0)	10.7 (51.3)
Mean daily minimum °C (°F)	1.6 (34.9)	1.5 (34.7)	2.9 (37.2)	4.9 (40.8)	8.6 (47.5)	11.4 (52.5)	13.3 (55.9)	13.2 (55.8)	10.6 (51.1)	7.8 (46.0)	4.8 (40.6)	2.4 (36.3)	6.9 (44.4)
Average precipitation mm (inches)	56.5 (2.22)	53.8 (2.12)	47.3 (1.86)	38.5 (1.52)	52.9 (2.08)	60.9 (2.40)	66.2 (2.61)	75.1 (2.96)	73.7 (2.90)	79.6 (3.13)	86.7 (3.41)	84.7 (3.33)	776.0 (30.55)
Average precipitation days (≥ 1.0 mm)	11.6	10.7	9.7	8.2	9.1	8.9	8.8	9.5	9.9	11.9	13.9	14.2	126.6
Mean monthly sunshine hours	60	82	139	199	223	227	232	218	166	118	64	50	1,778
Source: Royal Meteorological Institute
