= Morchies =

- Commune
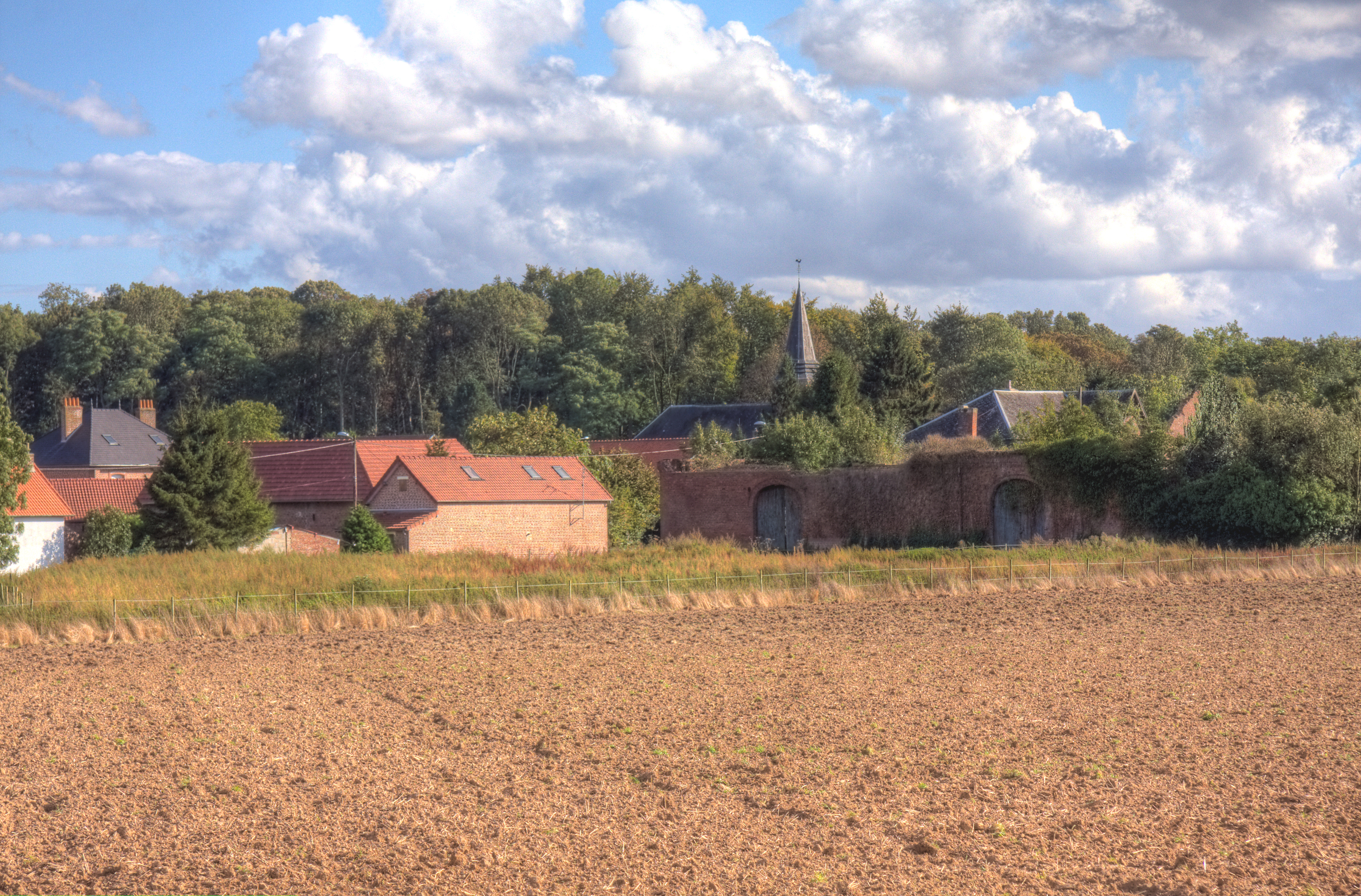
- A general view of Morchies

- Coat of arms
- Location of Morchies
- Location within France Location within Hauts-de-France
- Coordinates: 50°08′20″N 2°57′22″E
- Country: France
- Region: Hauts-de-France
- Department: Pas-de-Calais
- Arrondissement: Arras
- Canton: Bapaume
- Intercommunality: CC Sud-Artois

Government
  - Mayor (2020–2026): Evelyne Dromart
- Area^{1}: 6.64 km^{2} (2.56 sq mi)
- Elevation: 93 m (305 ft)
- Highest elevation: 117 m (384 ft)
- Lowest elevation: 85 m (279 ft)
- Population (2023): 210
  - Density: 32/km^{2} (82/sq mi)
- Time zone: UTC+01:00 (CET)
  - Summer (DST): UTC+02:00 (CEST)
- INSEE/Postal code: 62591 /62124
- ^{1} French Land Register data, which excludes lakes, ponds, glaciers > 1 km^{2} (0.386 sq mi or 247 acres) and river estuaries.

Morchies (French pronunciation: [mɔʁʃi]) is a commune in the Pas-de-Calais department in the Hauts-de-France region of France 17 miles (27 km) southeast of Arras.

== Population ==
Historical population
Year	Pop.	±% p.a.
1968	227	—
1975	252	+1.50%
1982	201	−3.18%
1990	174	−1.79%
1999	189	+0.92%
2007	179	−0.68%
2012	178	−0.11%
2017	210	+3.36%
2023	210	+0.00%
Source: INSEE

== See also ==
- Communes of the Pas-de-Calais department
