= List of Canadian flying aces =

This is a list of Canadian flying aces.

== World War I (1914–1918) ==
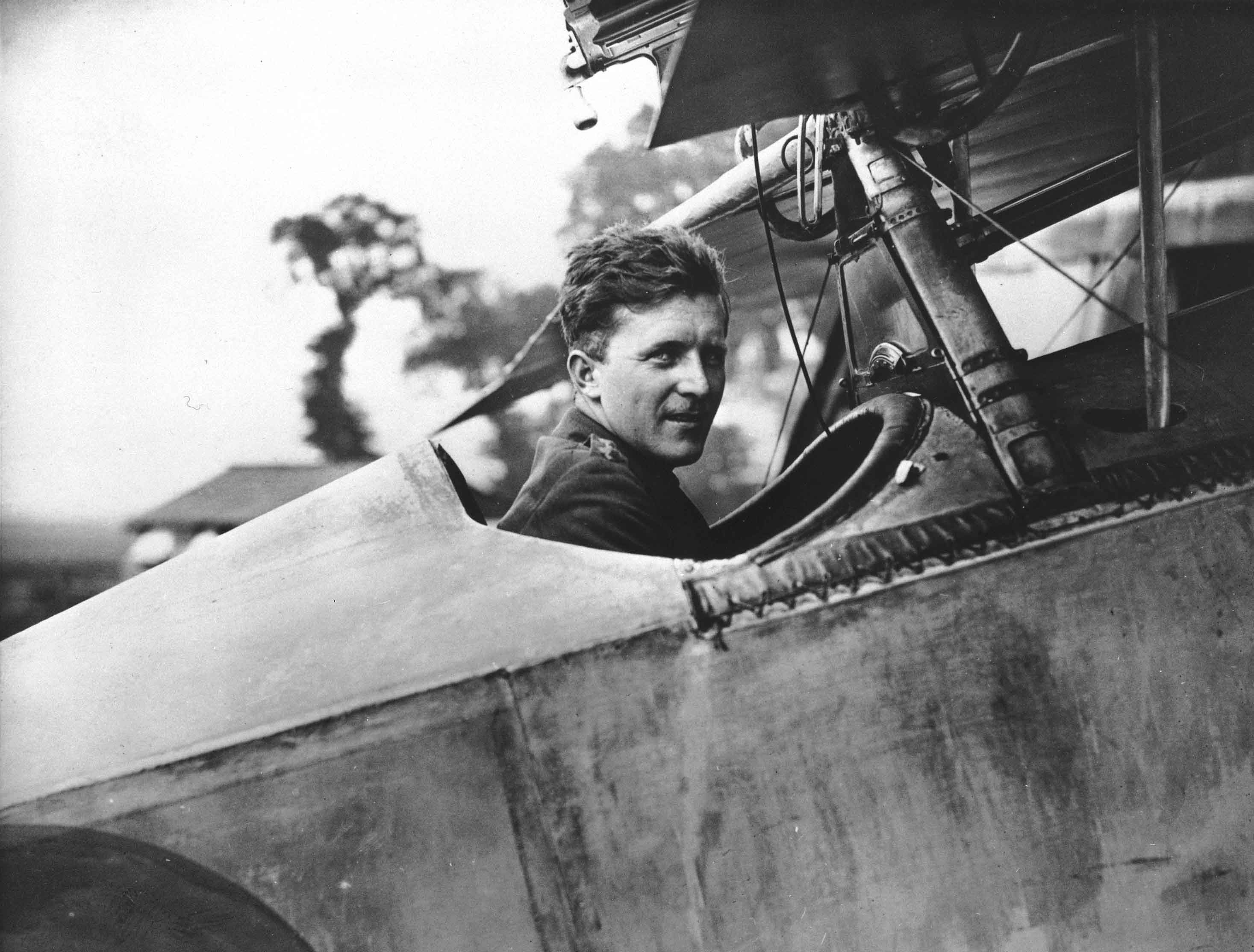
William Avery "Billy" Bishop, the highest scoring Canadian ace of all time.

The following is a list of Canadians that achieved 5 or more victories during World War I. They achieved this while flying for the Royal Flying Corps, the Royal Naval Air Service, or the Royal Air Force.

Name	Victories	Service
William Avery Bishop	72	Royal Flying Corps; Royal Air Force
Raymond Collishaw	60	Royal Naval Air Service; Royal Air Force
Donald Roderick MacLaren	54	Royal Flying Corps; Royal Air Force
William George Barker	50	Royal Flying Corps; Royal Air Force
Alfred Clayburn Atkey	38	Royal Flying Corps
William Gordon Claxton	37	Royal Air Force
Joseph Stewart Temple Fall	36	Royal Naval Air Service
Frederick Robert Gordon McCall	35	Royal Flying Corps; Royal Air Force
Frank Granger Quigley	33	Royal Flying Corps
Andrew Edward McKeever	31	Royal Flying Corps
Albert Desbrisay Carter	29	Royal Flying Corps; Royal Air Force
Reginald Theodore Carlos Hoidge	28	Royal Flying Corps; Royal Air Force
Clifford Mackay McEwen	27	Royal Flying Corps; Royal Air Force
Frank Ormond Soden	27	Royal Flying Corps; Royal Air Force
Arthur Treloar Whealy	27	Royal Naval Air Service; Royal Air Force
William McKenzie Thomson	26	Royal Air Force
Stanley Wallace Rosevear	25	Royal Naval Air Service; Royal Air Force
William Ernest Shields	24	Royal Air Force
William Melville Alexander	23	Royal Air Force; Royal Naval Air Service
Joseph Leonard Maries White	22	Royal Air Force
Harold Leslie Edwards	21	Royal Flying Corps
Charles Robert Reeves Hickey	21	Royal Naval Air Service; Royal Air Force
Kenneth Burns Conn	20	Royal Air Force
Camille Henry Raoul Lagesse	20	Royal Flying Corps; Royal Air Force
Arthur Bradfield Fairclough	19	Royal Flying Corps; Royal Air Force
Ellis Vair Reid	19	Royal Naval Air Service
George Chisholm MacKay	18	Royal Naval Air Service; Royal Air Force
Alfred Williams Carter	17	Royal Naval Air Service; Royal Air Force
Stearne Tighe Edwards	17	Royal Naval Air Service; Royal Air Force
Carl Frederick Falkenberg	17	Royal Air Force
Reginald Makepeace	17	Royal Flying Corps; Royal Air Force
Gerald Gordon Bell	16	Royal Flying Corps; Royal Air Force
Henry John Burden	16	Royal Flying Corps; Royal Air Force
James Alpheus Glen	15	Royal Naval Air Service; Royal Flying Corps
John Edmund Greene	15	Royal Naval Air Service; Royal Air Force
Carleton Main Clement	14	Royal Flying Corps
Albert Earl Godfrey	14	Royal Flying Corps
John Victor Sorsoleil	14	Royal Flying Corps; Royal Air Force
George Thomson	14	Royal Air Force
Hazel LeRoy Wallace	14	Royal Naval Air Service; Royal Air Force
Thomas Frederic Williams	14	Royal Flying Corps; Royal Air Force
Frederick Carr Armstrong	13	Royal Naval Air Service
Wilfred Austin Curtis	13	Royal Naval Air Service
George Robert Howsam	13	Royal Flying Corps; Royal Air Force
Ernest Charles Hoy	13	Royal Air Force
Harold Byron Hudson	13	Royal Flying Corps; Royal Air Force
Ronald McNeil Keirstead	13	Royal Naval Air Service
John Gerald Manuel	13	Royal Naval Air Service; Royal Air Force
Wilfrid Reid May	13	Royal Air Force
Stanley Stanger	13	Royal Flying Corps; Royal Air Force
Gerald Alfred Birks	12	Royal Flying Corps; Royal Air Force
Edwin C. Bromley	12	Royal Air Force
William Leeming Harrison	12	Royal Flying Corps; Royal Air Force
William Henry Hubbard	12	Royal Flying Corps; Royal Air Force
Gordon Budd Irving	12	Royal Flying Corps; Royal Air Force
William Stanley Jenkins	12	Royal Air Force
Roy Manzer	12	Royal Air Force
Douglas McGregor	12	Royal Flying Corps
Henry Coyle Rath	12	Royal Air Force
Alexander MacDonald Shook	12	Royal Naval Air Service
William Samuel Stephenson	12	Royal Flying Corps; Royal Air Force
Melville Wells Waddington	12	Royal Flying Corps
James Butler White	12	Royal Naval Air Service; Royal Air Force
Fred Everest Banbury	11	Royal Naval Air Service
Arnold Jacques Chadwick	11	Royal Naval Air Service
Hiram Frank Davison	11	Royal Flying Corps
William James Arthur Duncan	11	Royal Flying Corps; Royal Air Force
Charles Duncan Bremner Green	11	Royal Air Force
William Roy Irwin	11	Royal Air Force
Mansell Richard James	11	Royal Air Force
George Owen Johnson	11	Royal Flying Corps; Royal Air Force
Emile John Lussier	11	Royal Air Force
Harold Anthony Oaks	11	Royal Air Force
Hilliard Brooke Bell	10	Royal Flying Corps; Royal Air Force
Lloyd Samuel Breadner	10	Royal Naval Air Service
Arthur Roy Brown	10	Royal Naval Air Service; Royal Air Force
Frederick Elliott Brown	10	Royal Flying Corps
Robert Dodds	10	Royal Flying Corps
Alfred Michael Koch	10	Royal Flying Corps
John Joseph Malone	10	Royal Naval Air Service
Alfred Edwin McKay	10	Royal Flying Corps
Guy Borthwick Moore	10	Royal Flying Corps
Frank Harold Taylor	10	Royal Flying Corps; Royal Air Force
William Henry Brown	9	Royal Flying Corps; Royal Air Force
George William Bulmer	9	Royal Flying Corps; Royal Air Force
Leonard Arthur Christian	9	Royal Air Force
Richard Jeffries Dawes	9	Royal Flying Corps; Royal Air Force
Roger Amedee Del'Haye	9	Royal Air Force
George Clapham Dixon	9	Royal Flying Corps; Royal Air Force
James Henry Forman	9	Royal Flying Corps; Royal Air Force
Acheson Goulding	9	Royal Flying Corps; Royal Air Force
Harold Spencer Kerby	9	Royal Naval Air Service; Royal Air Force
David MacKay McGoun	9	Royal Flying Corps; Royal Air Force
William Wendell Rogers	9	Royal Flying Corps
Ernest James Salter	9	Royal Air Force
Anthony Spence	9	Royal Naval Air Service; Royal Air Force
Louis Mark Thompson	9	Royal Flying Corps; Royal Air Force
Kenneth Bowman Watson	9	Royal Air Force
Bernard Beanlands	8	Royal Flying Corps; Royal Air Force
William Benson Craig	8	Royal Air Force
John Dartnell De Pencier	8	Royal Flying Corps; Royal Air Force
William Durrand	8	Royal Flying Corps
Austin Lloyd Fleming	8	Royal Flying Corps
D'Arcy Fowlis Hilton	8	Royal Flying Corps
Ernest Graham Joy	8	Royal Flying Corps; Royal Air Force
Kenneth William Junor	8	Royal Flying Corps; Royal Air Force
William Myron MacDonald	8	Royal Air Force
Reginald George Malcolm	8	Royal Flying Corps
George Ivan Douglas Marks	8	Royal Flying Corps
Roderick McDonald	8	Royal Naval Air Service; Royal Air Force
William Jackson Rutherford	8	Royal Flying Corps
John Edward Sharman	8	Royal Naval Air Service
John Henry Smith	8	Royal Air Force
Langley Frank Willard Smith	8	Royal Naval Air Service
Alexander Gordon Tyrrell	8	Royal Flying Corps; Royal Air Force
Claude Melnot Wilson	8	Royal Air Force
Alan Duncan Bell-Irving	7	Royal Flying Corps
David Luther Burgess	7	Royal Flying Corps
Lynn Campbell	7	Royal Air Force
Arthur Claydon	7	Royal Flying Corps; Royal Air Force
Ernest Francis Hartley Davis	7	Royal Flying Corps; Royal Air Force
Henry Eric Dolan	7	Royal Flying Corps; Royal Air Force
Conway Farrell	7	Royal Flying Corps
George Buchanan Foster	7	Royal Air Force
Eric Charlton Gilroy	7	Royal Flying Corps; Royal Air Force
William Carrall Hilborn	7	Royal Air Force
Jeffrey Batters Home-Hay	7	Royal Flying Corps; Royal Air Force
Arthur Eyguem De Montainge Jarvis	7	Royal Air Force
Archibald Nathaniel Jenks	7	Royal Flying Corps
Harold Waddell Joslyn	7	Royal Flying Corps
Alfred Alexander Leitch	7	Royal Flying Corps; Royal Air Force
Malcolm Plaw MacLeod	7	Royal Air Force
Roy Kirkwood McConnell	7	Royal Flying Corps; Royal Air Force
Ernest Morrow	7	Royal Flying Corps; Royal Air Force
John Albert Page	7	Royal Naval Air Service
Stanley Asa Puffer	7	Royal Flying Corps; Royal Air Force
Lewis Hector Ray	7	Royal Air Force
Emerson Arthur Lincoln Fisher Smith	7	Royal Flying Corps
Merrill Samuel Taylor	7	Royal Naval Air Service; Royal Air Force
Percival Ewart Appleby	6	Royal Air Force
Henry Gordon Clappison	6	Royal Flying Corps
Irving Benfield Corey	6	Royal Air Force
Earl Frederick Crabb	6	Royal Air Force
Jack Elmer Drummond	6	Royal Flying Corps; Royal Air Force
Herbert Howard Snowden Fowler	6	Royal Naval Air Service; Royal Air Force
Daniel Murray Bayne Galbraith	6	Royal Naval Air Service
Richard Alexander Hewat	6	Royal Flying Corps; Royal Air Force
Ernest Tilton Sumpter Kelly	6	Royal Air Force
Earl Stanley Meek	6	Royal Flying Corps
Norman Craig Millman	6	Royal Flying Corps
Gerald Ewart Nash	6	Royal Naval Air Service
Medley Kingdon Perlee	6	Royal Flying Corps
William Keith Swayze	6	Royal Flying Corps; Royal Air Force
Harry Lutz Symons	6	Royal Flying Corps
George Leonary Trapp	6	Royal Naval Air Service
Harry Ellis Watson	6	Royal Flying Corps; Royal Air Force
Harry Alison Wood	6	Royal Flying Corps
George Benson Anderson	5	Royal Naval Air Service
Louis Drummond Bawlf	5	Royal Naval Air Service; Royal Air Force
George Water Blaicklock	5	Royal Naval Air Service
William Otway Boger	5	Royal Naval Air Service; Royal Air Force
Edward Borgfeld Booth	5	Royal Flying Corps
William Eric Bottrill	5	Royal Air Force
Harry Neville Compton	5	Royal Flying Corps
John Bonnicher Crompton	5	Royal Flying Corps
Lumsden Cummings	5	Royal Flying Corps
Chester Stairs Duffus	5	Royal Flying Corps
Edward Carter Eaton	5	Royal Flying Corps; Royal Air Force
William Boyd Elliott	5	Royal Air Force
Sydney Emerson Ellis	5	Royal Naval Air Service
George William Gladstone Gauld	5	Royal Air Force
John Gillanders	5	Royal Air Force
William Gillespie	5	Royal Flying Corps; Royal Air Force
Edward Rochford Grange	5	Royal Naval Air Service
Hugh Bradford Griffith	5	Royal Flying Corps
John Playton Hales	5	Royal Naval Air Service; Royal Air Force
Joseph E. Hallonquist	5	Royal Air Force
Earl McNabb Hand	5	Royal Flying Corps; Royal Air Force
Conrad Tolendal Lally	5	Royal Flying Corps
Robert Hanzel Little	5	Royal Flying Corps; Royal Air Force
Ross Morrison MacDonald	5	Royal Air Force
John Finlay Noel MacRae	5	Royal Flying Corps
Patrick Scarsfield Manley	5	Royal Air Force
William Drummond Matheson	5	Royal Flying Corps; Royal Air Force
John Harry McNeaney	5	Royal Air Force
Russel Fern McRae	5	Royal Flying Corps; Royal Air Force
Harold Arthur Sydney Molyneaux	5	Royal Air Force
Harold Edgar Mott	5	Royal Naval Air Service
Redford Henry Mulock	5	Royal Naval Air Service
John Edward Pugh	5	Royal Flying Corps; Royal Air Force
James Robert Smith	5	Royal Flying Corps
George Arthur Welsh	5	Royal Air Force
Robert Kenneth Whitney	5	Royal Air Force

== World War II (1939–1945) ==
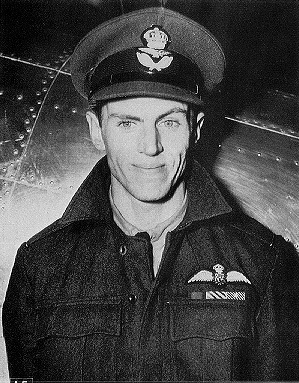
George "Buzz" Beurling, the highest scoring Canadian ace of World War II.

The following is a list of Canadians that achieved 5 or more victories during World War II.

Name	Victories	Service
George Frederick Beurling	31.33	Royal Air Force; Royal Canadian Air Force
Henry Wallace McLeod	21	Royal Air Force; Royal Canadian Air Force
Vernon Crompton Woodward	19.83	Royal Air Force
William Lidstone McKnight	16.5	Royal Air Force
Robert Wendell McNair	16.5	Royal Air Force; Royal Canadian Air Force
Edward Francis John Charles	15.5	Royal Air Force
James Francis Edwards	15	Royal Canadian Air Force
William Klersy	15	Royal Canadian Air Force
Donald Currie Laubman	15	Royal Canadian Air Force
Robert Alexander Barton	14.5	Royal Air Force
Arthur Benoit Leduc≈	14.5	Royal Canadian Air Force
John Frederick McElroy	14.5	Royal Air Force; Royal Canadian Air Force
Robert Carl Fumerton	14	Royal Air Force; Royal Canadian Air Force
Percival Stanley Turner	14	Royal Air Force
George Urquhart Hill	13.53	Royal Air Force; Royal Canadian Air Force
Roderick Illingworth Alpine Smith	13.25	Royal Air Force; Royal Canadian Air Force
George Clinton Keefer	13	Royal Canadian Air Force
John Alexander Kent	13	Royal Air Force
John Howard Turnbull	12.5	Royal Air Force
Irving Farmer Kennedy	12.08	Royal Air Force; Royal Canadian Air Force
Albert Ulrich Houle	11.5	Royal Air Force; Royal Canadian Air Force
John MacKay	11.2	Royal Canadian Air Force
Donald Campbell Gordon	11	Royal Air Force; Royal Canadian Air Force
Eric Norman Woods	10.66	Royal Air Force
Richard Joseph Audet	10.5	Royal Canadian Air Force
Robert Allan Kipp	10.5	Royal Canadian Air Force
John Mitchner	10.5	Royal Canadian Air Force
Dallas Wilbur Schmidt	10.5	Royal Air Force
James Elmslie Walker	10.5	Royal Canadian Air Force
Hamilton Upton	10.33	Royal Air Force
Frederick Alan Aikman	9.5	Royal Air Force
Leslie Cyril Gosling	9.5	Royal Air Force
Wilfred John Banks	9	Royal Canadian Air Force
Russell Bannock	9	Royal Canadian Air Force
George William Johnson	9	Royal Canadian Air Force
John Urwin-Mann	9	Royal Air Force
John Wiliam Williams	9	Royal Air Force
George Noel Keith	8.5	Royal Air Force
James Douglas Lindsay	8.5	Royal Air Force
Geoffrey Wilson Northcott	8.5	Royal Air Force; Royal Canadian Air Force
Hugh Charles Trainor	8.5	Royal Canadian Air Force
Andrew Robert MacKenzie	8.25	Royal Canadian Air Force
William Lawrence Chisholm	8	Royal Air Force
Garth Edwards Horricks	8	Royal Air Force; Royal Australian Air Force
David Robert Charles Jamieson	8	Royal Canadian Air Force
Donald Mathew Pieri	8	Royal Canadian Air Force
J.A. Ray	8	Royal Air Force
Joseph Guillaume Laurent Robillard	8	Royal Air Force; Royal Canadian Air Force
Rayne Dennis Schultz	8	Royal Canadian Air Force
James Hamilton Ballantyne	7.75	Royal Air Force; Royal Canadian Air Force
Robert Davidson Grassick	7.5	Royal Air Force
Bruce Johnstone Ingalls	7.5	Royal Air Force; Royal Canadian Air Force
Harry Deane MacDonald	7.5	Royal Canadian Air Force
Robert Rutherford Smith	7.5	Royal Air Force
John Blandford Latta	7.33	Royal Air Force
James Duncan Smith	7.33	Royal Air Force
George Patterson Christie	7	Royal Air Force
Homer Powel Cochrane	7	Royal Air Force
Hugh Constant Godefroy	7	Royal Air Force; Royal Canadian Air Force
Douglas Irving Hall	7	Royal Canadian Air Force
James D. Lindsey	7	
Donald Aikens MacFadyen	7	Royal Canadian Air Force
Ian Roy MacLennan	7	Royal Air Force
John Felton Mackie	7	Royal Air Force
Thomas Lawrence Patterson	7	Royal Air Force
Gordon Learmont Raphael	7	Royal Air Force
James Dean Somerville	7	Royal Canadian Air Force
Noel Karl Stansfeld	7	Royal Air Force
James Arthur Walker	7	Royal Air Force
Henry Paul Michael Zary	7	Royal Canadian Air Force
Lloyd Vernon Chadburn	6.58	Royal Air Force; Royal Canadian Air Force
Robert Andrew Buckham	6.5	Royal Canadian Air Force
Walter Allan Grenfell Conrad	6.5	Royal Air Force
Robert Tremayne Pillsbury Davidson	6.5	Royal Air Force
Harry Thorpe Mitchell	6.5	Royal Air Force
Joseph Jean Paul Sabourin	6.5	Royal Air Force
Harry James Dowding	6.33	Royal Canadian Air Force
Alfred Keith Ogilvie	6.33	Royal Air Force
Gordon William Troke	6.25	Royal Air Force; Royal Canadian Air Force
Howard Peter Blatchford	6	Royal Air Force
Matthew S. Jr. Byrnes	6	United States Navy
Lorne Maxwell Cameron	6	Royal Canadian Air Force
William Watson Downer	6	Royal Air Force
Charles Emanuel Edinger	6	Royal Canadian Air Force
Leslie Sydney Ford	6	Royal Canadian Air Force
C.M. Jasper	6	Royal Canadian Air Force
Donald Harold Kimball	6	Royal Canadian Air Force
Joseph Emil Paul Laricheliere	6	Royal Air Force
L.A. Moore	6	Royal Air Force
William Henry Nelson	6	Royal Air Force
George Pepper	6	Royal Air Force
Lloyd Gilbert Schwab	6	Royal Air Force
James Henry Whalen	6	Royal Air Force
Frederick Albert William Johnson Wilson	6	Royal Canadian Air Force
Wilbert George Dodd	5.58	Royal Air Force
J.F. Barrick	5.5	Royal Canadian Air Force
John Joseph Boyle	5.5	Royal Canadian Air Force
Howard Douglas Cleveland	5.5	Royal Canadian Air Force
Harry Elmore Fenwick	5.5	Royal Air Force
Lionel Manley Gaunce	5.5	Royal Air Force
Robert Kitchener Hayward	5.5	Royal Canadian Air Force
Ernest A. McNab	5.5	Royal Canadian Air Force
Guy Elwood Mott	5.5	Royal Canadian Air Force
David Edward Ness	5.5	Royal Air Force
Rodney Thirsk Phipps	5.5	Royal Air Force
Blair D. Russel	5.5	Royal Canadian Air Force
Hugh Norman Tamblyn	5.5	Royal Air Force
David John Williams	5.5	Royal Canadian Air Force
W.J.E. Harten	5.41	Royal Canadian Air Force
H.D. Edwards	5.33	Royal Air Force
Douglas Franklin Husband	5.33	Royal Air Force; Royal Canadian Air Force
Ronald Robert Morrison	5.33	Royal Canadian Air Force
Donald George Reid	5.33	Royal Air Force
Daniel Edward Noonan	5.25	Royal Canadian Air Force
Gregory Donald Angus Tunnicliffe Cameron	5.2	Royal Canadian Air Force
R.M. Davenport	5.2	Royal Canadian Air Force
Hedley Joseph Everard	5.2	Royal Air Force; Royal Canadian Air Force
Allen Benjamin Angus	5	Royal Air Force
Michael Wilmont Hamilton Askey	5	Royal Air Force
Foss Henry Boulton	5	Royal Canadian Air Force
Russell Reginald Bouskill	5	Royal Canadian Air Force
William Ranson Breithaupt	5	Royal Canadian Air Force
Ralph Isaac Edward	5	Royal Air Force; Royal Canadian Air Force
P.R. Burton-Gyles	5	Royal Canadian Air Force
John Todd Caine	5	Royal Canadian Air Force
Philip Marcel Charron	5	Royal Air Force; Royal Canadian Air Force
H.A. Crawford	5	Royal Air Force
Robert William Rouviere Day	5	Royal Air Force
Cleo Gauthier	6	Royal Air Force
Malcolm Grant Graham	5	Royal Canadian Air Force
Paul Gilbert Johnson	5	Royal Air Force
Milton Eardley Jowsey	5	Royal Air Force; Royal Canadian Air Force
Walter Gordon Kirkwood	5	Royal Air Force
Esli Gordon Lapp	5	Royal Canadian Air Force
Arthur George Lawrence	5	Royal Canadian Air Force
Charles McLaughlin Magwood	5	Royal Canadian Air Force
Frederick Thomas Murray	5	Royal Canadian Air Force
John William Neil	5	Royal Air Force; Royal Canadian Air Force
M. Reeves	5	Royal Canadian Air Force
A.H. Sager	5	Royal Canadian Air Force
Donald John Sheppard	5	FAA
Jackson Eddis Sheppard	5	Royal Canadian Air Force
Albert Ivan Smith	5	Royal Air Force
F.M. Smith	5	Royal Air Force
Gordon Wonnacott	5	Royal Canadian Air Force

== Multiple wars ==
Clifford "Denny" Wilson, served in both World War II and the 1948 Arab–Israeli War

The following is a list of Canadians that achieved 5 or more victories throughout multiple wars.

Name	Total Victories	Notes
John Joseph Doyle	5	4 victories in the 1948 Arab–Israeli War and 1 in World War II
Joseph Auguste Omer Lévesque	5	4 victories in World War II and 1 in the Korean War
Clifford Denzel Woodrow Wilson	5	3 victories in 1948 Arab–Israeli War and 2 in World War II

== Sources ==
- Air Aces on Safarikovi.org
- Aces on TheAeroDrome.com
