= List of World War I aces from Canada =

This is a list of flying aces in World War I from Canada. A flying ace is a military aviator credited with shooting down five or more enemy aircraft during aerial combat. Canadians served in the British flying services–the Royal Flying Corps, the Royal Naval Air Service, and the Royal Air Force, as Canada had no air arm until the formation of the Canadian Air Force on September 19, 1918.

For a master list of victories during the conflict, see List of World War I flying aces.

== Canadian World War I aces ==
=== More than 10 victories ===
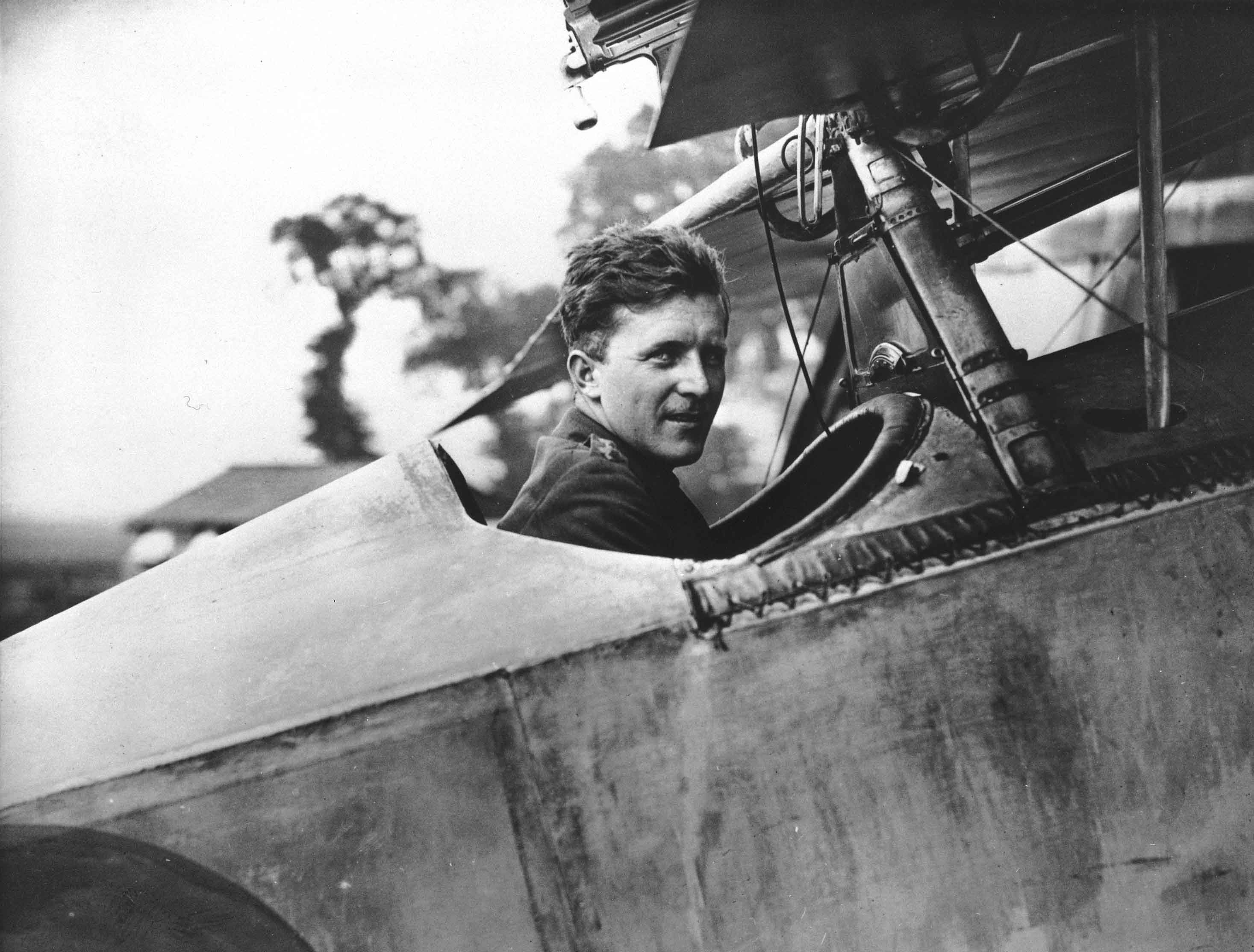
Billy Bishop

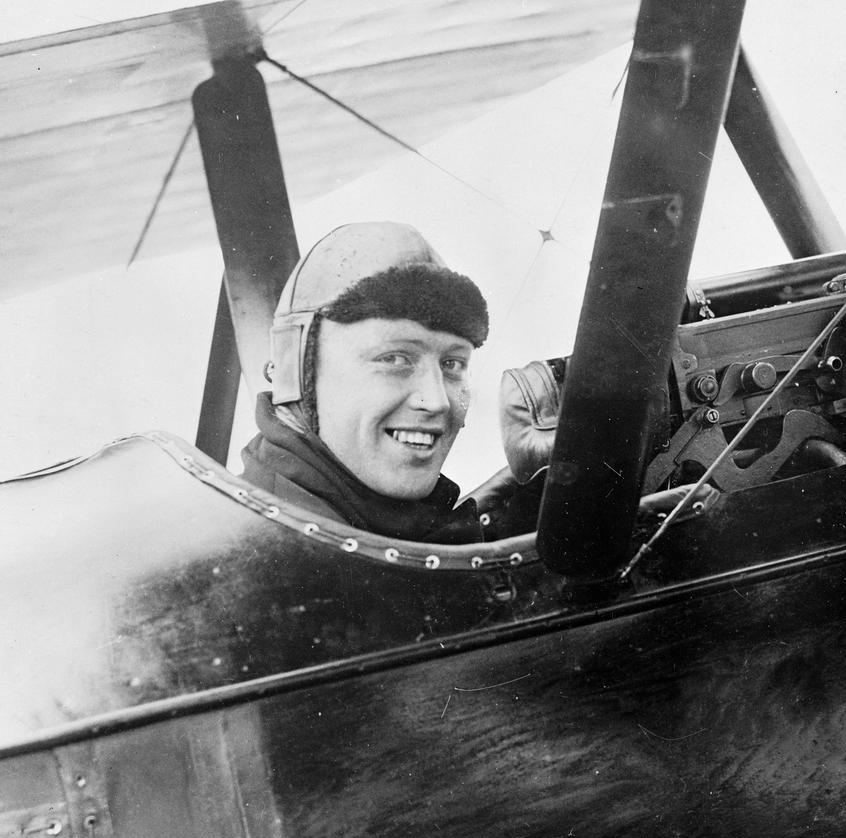
Raymond Collishaw

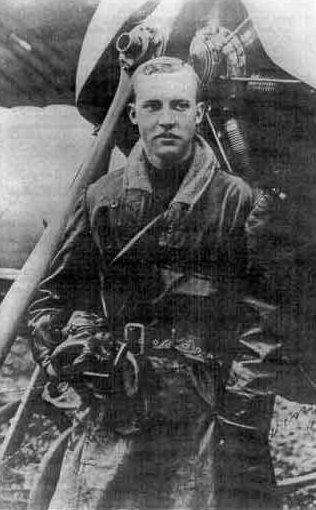
"Wop" May

This indicates that the pilot was either killed in action or killed in a flying accident.

Name	Rank	Victories	Unit(s)	Notes
Billy Bishop	Lieutenant Colonel	72	21, 60, 85	VC (1894–1956)
Raymond Collishaw	Lieutenant Colonel	60	10N, 13N, 3W (RNAS); 47, 203 (RAF)	(1893–1976)
Donald Roderick MacLaren	Major	54	46	(1893–1988)
William George Barker	Major	50	4, 9, 15, 28, 66 (RFC); 139, 201 (RAF)	VC DSO MC. Killed in aircraft accident 1930
Alfred Clayburn Atkey	Captain	38	18, 22	(1894–1971)
William Gordon Claxton	Captain	37	41	
Joseph Stewart Temple Fall	Flight Commander	36	3N, 9N (RNAS)	
Frederick Robert Gordon McCall	Captain	35	13, 41	
Frank Granger Quigley	Captain	33	70	
Andrew Edward McKeever	Lieutenant Colonel	31	11	
Albert Desbrisay Carter	Major	28	19	
Reginald Hoidge	Captain	28	1, 56	
Clifford MacKay McEwen	Lieutenant	27	28	
Frank Ormond Soden	Captain	27	41, 60	
Arthur Whealy	Captain	27	3N, 9N, 3W (RNAS); 203 (RAF)	
William McKenzie Thomson	Captain	26	20	
Stanley Wallace Rosevear	Captain	25	1 Naval (RNAS); 201 (RAF)	
William Ernest Shields	Captain	24	41	
William Melville Alexander	Captain	22	10N, 3W (RNAS); 210 (RAF)	
Joseph Leonard Maries White	Captain	22	65	
Harold Leslie Edwards	2nd Lieutenant	21	20	
Charles Hickey	Captain	21	4N (RNAS); 204 (RAF)	
Kenneth Burns Conn	Lieutenant	20	88	
Camille Lagesse	Captain	20	29	
Arthur Bradfield Fairclough	Captain	19	19, 23	
Ellis Vair Reid	Flight Sub Lieutenant	19	3W; 10N	
George Chisholm MacKay	Captain	18	13N (RNAS); 213 (RAF)	
Alfred Williams Carter	Major	17	3N, 10N, 3W (RNAS); 210 (RAF)	
Stearne Tighe Edwards	Captain	17	2N, 6N, 9N, 11N; 3W (RNAS); 209 (RAF)	
Carl Frederick Falkenberg	Captain	17	84	
Gerald Gordon Bell	Captain	16	17, 22, 47 (RFC); 150 (RAF)	
Henry John Burden	Captain	16	56, 72, 85	
James Alpheus Glen	Captain	15	3N, 10N (RNAS); 203 (RAF)	
John Edmund Greene	Captain	15	13N (RNAS); 213 (RAF)	
Carleton Main Clement	Captain	14	22	
Albert Earl Godfrey	Captain	14	10, 25, 40, 44, 78	
John Victor Sorsoleil	Captain	14	84	
George Thomson	Lieutenant	14	22	
Hazel LeRoy Wallace	Captain	14	9N (RNAS); 3, 201 (RAF)	
Thomas Frederic Williams	Captain	14	28, 45	Founding member of RCAF; elected to Canada's Aviation Hall of Fame
Frederick Carr Armstrong	Flight Commander	13	3N; 3W (RNAS)	
Wilfred Austin Curtis	Flight Commander	13	6N, 10N	Elected to Canada's Aviation Hall of Fame
George Robert Howsam	Captain	13	43, 70	Retired as Air Vice-Marshal of RCAF
Ernest Charles Hoy	Captain	13	29	Made the first airmail flight over the Canadian Rockies 7 August 1919
Harold Byrn Hudson	Lieutenant	13	28, 45	
Ronald McNeill Keirstead	Captain	13	4N (RNAS); 204 (RAF)	
John Gerald Manuel	Captain	13	10N, 12N (RNAS); 210 (RAF)	
Wilfrid Reid May	Captain	13	209	
Stanley Stanger	Captain	13	28, 66	
Gerald Alfred Birks	Lieutenant	12	66	
Edwin Claude Bromley	Lieutenant	12	22	
William Leeming Harrison	Captain	12	1, 40	
William Henry Hubbard	Captain	12	5, 7, 73	
Gordon Budd Irving	Captain	12	19	
William Stanley Jenkins	Captain	12	210 (RAF)	
Roy Manzer	Captain	12	84	
Douglas McGregor	Captain	12	23	
Henry Coyle Rath	Lieutenant	12	29	
Alexander MacDonald Shook	Major	12	4N (RNAS); 204 (RAF)	
William Samuel Stephenson	Captain	12	73	Head of British Intelligence in the Western Hemisphere during World War II
Melville Wells Waddington	Lieutenant	12	20	
James Butler White	Captain	12	8N (RNAS); 208 (RAF)	
Fred Everest Banbury	Captain	11	9N (RNAS)	
Arnold Jacques Chadwick	Flight Commander	11	4N, 5W (RNAS)	
Hiram Frank Davison	Lieutenant	11	22	
Art Duncan	Captain	11	60	
Charles D. B. Green	Lieutenant	11	47 (RFC); 150 (RAF)	
William Roy Irwin	Captain	11	56	
Mansell Richard James	Captain	11	45	
George Owen Johnson	Captain	11	24, 84	
Harold Anthony Oaks	Captain	11	48	Elected to Canada's Aviation Hall of Fame
Hilliard Brooke Bell	Captain	10	66	
Lloyd Samuel Breadner	Major	10	3W, 3N (RNAS); 204 (RAF)	Air Chief Marshal Breadner achieved the highest rank ever awarded in the RCAF
Arthur Roy Brown	Captain	10	4N, 9N, 11N (RNAS); 209 (RAF)	Credited with shooting down Manfred von Richthofen (the Red Baron)
Frederick Elliott Brown	Captain	10	2, 84	
Robert Dodds	Captain	10	48	
Alfred Michael Koch	Lieutenant	10	1, 6, 70	
John Joseph Malone	Flight Sub-Lieutenant	10	3N, 3W (RNAS)	
Alfred Edwin McKay	Captain	10	23, 24	
Guy Borthwick Moore	Captain	10	1	
Frank Harold Taylor	Lieutenant	10	41, 84	
John Henry Tudhope	Captain	10	40	

=== Fewer than 10 victories ===
Name	Rank	Victories	Unit(s)	Notes
Bernard Paul Gascoigne Beanlands	Captain	9	24, 70	
William Henry Brown	Lieutenant	9	84	
George William Bulmer	Captain	9	22	
Leonard Arthur Christian	Lieutenant	9	6N (RNAS); 206 (RAF)	
Richard Jeffries Dawes	Captain	9	28, 45	
Roger Amedee Del'Haye	Captain	9	13, 19	
George Clapham Dixon	Captain	9	40, 43, 85	
James Henry Forman	Captain	9	1N, 6N (RNAS); 70, 201 (RAF)	
Acheson Goulding	Captain	9	17 (RFC); 150 (RAF)	
Harold Spencer Kerby	Captain	9	3N, 9N, 3W (RNAS); Walmer HD	
David MacKay McGoun	Captain	9	20, 22	
William Wendell Rogers	Captain	9	1	
Ernest James Salter	Captain	9	54	
Anthony George Allen Spence	Lieutenant	9	1N (RNAS); 201 (RAF)	
Louis Mark Thompson	Lieutenant	9	62	
Kenneth Bowman Watson	Lieutenant	9	28, 70	
William Benson Craig	Lieutenant	8	4N (RNAS); 204 (RAF)	
John Dartnell De Pencier	Captain	8	19 (RFC); 12 (RAF)	
William Durrand, Jr.	Lieutenant	8	20	
Austin Lloyd Fleming	Captain	8	46, 111	
D'Arcy Fowlis Hilton	Lieutenant	8	29	
Ernest Graham Joy	Major	8	49, 57 (RFC); 205 (RAF)	
Kenneth William Junor	Captain	8	56	
Arthur Gerald Knight	Captain	8	4, 24, 29	Manfred von Richthofen (the Red Baron)'s 13th victim.
William Myron MacDonald	Lieutenant	8	66	
Reginald George Malcolm	Captain	8	25	
George Ivan Douglas Marks	Lieutenant	8	23	
Roderick McDonald	Captain	8	8N (RNAS); 208 (RAF)	
William Jackson Rutherford	Captain	8	60	
John Edward Sharman	Flight Commander	8	3W, 10N	
John Henry Smith	Lieutenant	8	46	
Langley Frank Willard Smith	Flight Sub-lieutenant	8	4N (RNAS)	
Alexander Gordon Tyrrell	Lieutenant	8	73	
Claude Melnot Wilson	Lieutenant	8	25, 29, 93	
Alan Duncan Bell-Irving	Captain	7	7, 60	
Thomas James Birmingham	Lieutenant	7	22	
Cecil Guelph Brock	Lieutenant	7	1N, 9N (RNAS); 3, 209 (RAF)	
David Luther Burgess	Lieutenant	7	25	
Lynn Campbell	Captain	7	62	
Ernest Francis Hartley Davis	Lieutenant	7	41	
Clennell Haggerston Dickins	2nd Lieutenant	7	211	Named an Officer of the Order of the British Empire in 1935, an Officer of the Order of Canada in 1968
Conway Farrell	Captain	7	24, 56	
George Buchanan Foster	Lieutenant	7	24	Named an Officer of the Order of the British Empire in 1946
Eric Charlton Gilroy	Lieutenant	7	11	
William Carrall Hilborn	Captain	7	28, 45, 66	
Jeffrey Batters Home-Hay	Captain	7	53, 104	
Arthur Jarvis	Lieutenant	7	17 (RFC); 150 (RAF)	
Archie Nathaniel Jenks	Lieutenant	7	20	
Harold Waddell Joslyn	Lieutenant	7	20	
Alfred Alexander Leitch	Captain	7	43, 65	
Malcolm Plaw MacLeod	Lieutenant	7	41	
Roy Kirkwood McConnell	Lieutenant	7	46	
Ernest Morrow	Captain	7	62	
John Albert Page	Flight Lieutenant	7	3N, 10N	
Stanley Asa Puffer	Lieutenant	7	41	
Lewis Hector Ray	Lieutenant	7	19	
Emerson Smith	Lieutenant	7	45	Shot down by Joachim von Busse of Jasta 3 on 26 October 1917, captured.
Merrill Samuel Taylor	Lieutenant	7	9N (RNAS); 209 (RAF)	
Percival Ewart Appleby	Lieutenant	6	104	
Henry Gordon Clappison	Captain	6	4N (RNAS); 204 (RAF)	
Irving Banfield Corey	2nd Lieutenant	6	103	
Earl Frederick Crabb	Lieutenant	6	92	
John Elmer Drummond	Captain	6	22, 48	
Herbert Howard Snowden Fowler	Lieutenant	6	8N, 12N (RNAS); 208 (RAF)	Discharged from the RAF when it was determined that he was almost completely deaf.
Daniel Murray Bayne Galbraith	Captain	6	8N, 1W	
Ernest Tilton Sumpter Kelly	2nd Lieutenant	6	1	
Earl Stanley Meek	Captain	6	29	
Norman Craig Millman	Captain	6	48	
Gerald Ewart Nash	Flight Lieutenant	6	10N	Shot down by Karl Allmenröder of Jasta 11, captured
Medley Kingdon Parlee	2nd Lieutenant	6	22	
William Keith Swayze	Lieutenant	6	62	
Harry Lutz Symons	Captain	6	65	
Victor Wentworth Thompson	Lieutenant	6	43, 64	
George Leonard Trapp	Flight Sub-Lieutenant	6	10N	
Harry Ellis Watson	Lieutenant	6	41	
Harry Alison Wood	Major	6	24	
George Benson Anderson	Flight Lieutenant	5	3N, 3W (RNAS)	
Louis Drummond Bawlf	Captain	5	3N (RNAS); 203 (RAF)	
George Walker Blaiklock	Lieutenant	5	45	
William Otway Boger	Captain	5	11, 56, 92	
Edward Borgfeldt Booth	Lieutenant	5	70	
William Eric Bottrill	2nd Lieutenant	5	104	
Harry Neville Compton	Lieutenant	5	23	
John Bonnicher Crompton	Captain	5	60	
Lumsden Cummings	Captain	5	1	
Chester Stairs Duffus	Major	5	22, 25	
Edward Carter Eaton	Lieutenant	5	65	
William Boyd Elliott	Captain	5	103 (RFC); 205 (RAF)	
Sydney Emerson Ellis	Flight Sub-lieutenant	5	4N (RNAS)	
George William Gladstone Gauld	Lieutenant	5	74	
John Gordon Gillanders	Lieutenant	5	18, 103	
William John Gillespie	Lieutenant	5	41	
Edward Rochfort Grange	Flight Lieutenant	5	8N, 1W (RNAS); 208 (RAF)	
Hugh Bradford Griffith	Captain	5	11, 20, 48	
John Playford Hales	Captain	5	9N (RNAS); 203 (RAF)	
Joseph Eskel Hallonquist	Captain	5	28	
Earl McNabb Hand	Captain	5	45, 71, 73	Shot down and captured on 1 June 1918
Conrad Tolendal Lally	Captain	5	25	
Robert Hazen Little	Lieutenant	5	20, 48	
Ross Morrison MacDonald	Lieutenant	5	15, 87	Shot down and captured on 29 September 1918
John Finlay Noel MacRae	Lieutenant	5	23	
Patrick Sarsfield Manley	2nd Lieutenant	5	62	Shot down and captured on 27 September 1918
William Drummond Matheson	Captain	5	25	
John Harry McNeaney	Captain	5	79	Only Canadian ace in 79 Squadron
Russell Fern McRae	Lieutenant	5	4 (AFC); 46 (RFC)	
Harold Arthur Sydney Molyneux	Lieutenant	5	56, 60	
Harold Edgar Mott	Captain	5	9N (RNAS)	
Redford Henry Mulock	Colonel	5	3N, 1W, 82W	First Canadian and first RNAS ace of the war
John Edwardes Pugh	Captain	5	25	
John Bernard Russell	2nd Lieutenant	5	103	
James Robert Smith	2nd Lieutenant	5	18, 33, 51, 78	
George Arthur Welsh	Lieutenant	5	210 (RAF)	
Robert Kenneth Whitney	Lieutenant	5	60	

== See also ==
- List of Canadian air aces
