= List of World War II aces from Canada =

This is a list of fighter aces in World War II from Canada. For other countries see List of World War II aces by country

== A ==
| Name | Kills | Awards | Notes |
|---|---|---|---|
| Aikman, Frederick Alan | 10 | DFC* | Wingman of Paddy Finucane |
| Angus, Allen Benjamin | 5 | DFC | KIA 16 May 1940 |
| Archer, Philip Leslie I | 6 | DFC | KIA 17 June 1943 |
| Armstrong, H A | 5 | | |
| Arthur, Charles Ian Rose "Duke" | 6 | | |
| Askey, Michael William Hamilton | 5 | | KIA 28 October 1943 |
| Atkinson, William Henry Isaac | 5 | DSC | FAA |
| Audet, Richard Joseph "Dick" | 11 | DFC* | KIA 3 March 1945 |

== B ==
| Name | Kills | Awards | Notes |
|---|---|---|---|
| Ballantyne, James Hamilton | 6 | DFM | |
| Banks, Wilfred John | 9 | DFC* | |
| Bannock, Russell "Russ" | 28 | DSO, DFC* | |
| Barton, Robert Alexander "Butch" | 17 | DFC* | Battle of Britain, Surviving Aircrew |
| Beurling, George "Buzz/Screwball" | 32 | DSO, DFC, DFM* | KIFA 20 May 1948 |
| Blatchford, Howard Peter "Cowboy" | 8 | DFC | Battle of Britain, KIA 3 May 1943 |
| Bodien, Henri Erskine ("Joe") | 5 (Note: Victories: 1 Dornier Do 17z (4/5 Feb 1941; Defiant, gunner D.E.C. Jonas); 1 Heinkel He 111 (9/10 Apr 1941; Defiant, gunner D.E.C. Jonas. Believing Bodien was dead Jonas bailed out and died); 1 He 111 (3/4 May 1941; Defiant); 1 Do 17 damaged (8/9 Sep 1942; Mosquito); 1 Do 17 (17/18 Sep 1942; Mosquito); 1 Junkers Ju 88 (19 June 1943; Mosquito)) | DFC | Night fighter ace. Flew a Boulton Paul Defiant in No. 151 (Night Fighter) Squadron RAF so the first three of his victories are also credited to his air gunner, for first two this was Sgt. D.E.C. Jonas (KIA 10 Apr 1941). Bodien retired 6 July 1966 as a wing commander. Died 1999 |
| Boulton, Henry "Foss" | 5 | DFC | |
| Bouskill, Russell Reginald | 5 | DFC | KIA 2 October 1944 |
| Bowker, Harlow W "Bud" | 7 | DFC | KIA 2 JULY 1944 |
| Boyle, John Greer "Beryl" | 7 | | Battle of Britain, KIA 28 September 1940 |
| Boyle, John Joseph | 6 | DFC | |
| Brannagan, Thomas A "Tommy" | 7 | DFC | |
| Breithaupt, William Ranson | 5 | DFC | KIA 12 September 1944 |
| Britten, Ralph Isaac Edward | 5 | DFC | |
| Brown, Mark Henry "Hilly" | 19 | DFC*, MC (Czech) | Battle of Britain, KIA November 1941 (Sicily) |
| Buckham, Robert Andrew | 7 | DFC*, DFC (US) | |

== C ==
| Name | Kills | Awards | Notes |
|---|---|---|---|
| Caine, John Todd | 6 | DFC** | |
| Cameron, Gregory Donald Angus Tunnicliffe | 5 | DFC | |
| Cameron, Lorne Maxwell | 6 | | |
| Chadburn, Lloyd Vernon "Chad" | 8 | DSO*, DFC, LdH, CdG | KIA 13 June 1944 (Collision) |
| Charles, Edward Francis John "Jack" | 16 | DSO, DFC* | Battle of Britain |
| Charron, Philip Marcel | 7 | | KIA 19 November 1944 |
| Chisholm, William Lawrence "Red" | 8 | DFC* | |
| Christie, George Paterson | 7 | DFC* | KIA 6 July 1942 |
| Cleveland, Howard Douglas | 5 | DFC | |
| Cochran, Homer Powell | 9 | DFC | |
| Cochrane, Arthur Charles "Cocky" | 6 | DFC | Battle of Britain, MIA 31 March 1943 |
| Connel, William Charles "Bud" | 5 | DFC | |
| Conrad, Walter Allan Grenfell | 8 | DFC* | |
| Cotterill, Stanley Herbert Ross | 8 | DFC | KIFA 18 October 1944 |
| Crawford, Harvey Alexander | 5 | DFC | |

== D ==
| Name | Kills | Awards | Notes |
|---|---|---|---|
| Dack, David Blake | 3+2 on ground | | |
| Davidson, Robert Tremagne Pillsbury | 6 | DFC | |
| Day, Robert William Rouviere | 6 | | |
| Dodd, Wilbert George | 8 | DFC | |
| Dover, Dean Hugh | 5 | DFC* | |
| Dowding, Harry James | 8 | DFC* | |
| Downer, William Watson | 5 | DFC | KIA 16 April 1944 |
| Draper, John William Petterson | 5 | DFC | |
| Durno, Leslie Duncan | 5 | MiD* | FAA, KIA 29 January 1945 |

== E ==
| Name | Kills | Awards | Notes |
|---|---|---|---|
| Edinger, Charles Emanuel | 6+1 Damaged | DFC | |
| Edwards, Harry Davies | 5 | | Battle of Britain, KIA 11 September 1940 |
| Edwards, James Francis "Stocky" | 18 | DFC*, DFM | CM, CD |
| Engbrecht, Peter | 6 | CGM | Gunner |
| Evans, Colin John | 9 | | |
| Everard, Hedley Joseph "Snooks" | 6 | DFC | |

== F ==
| Name | Kills | Awards | Notes |
|---|---|---|---|
| Fenwick, Harry Elmore | 6 | DFC | KIA 21 June 1944 |
| Ford, Leslie Sydney | 6 | DFC* | KIA 4 June 1943 |
| Forsyth, David Esplin | 8 | | |
| Fowlow, Norman Ralph | 5 | | Newfoundland |
| Fumerton, Robert Carl "Moose" | 14 | DFC*, AFC | Battle of Britain |

== G ==
| Name | Kills | Awards | Notes |
|---|---|---|---|
| Gaunce, Lionel Manley "Elmer" | 6 | DFC | Battle of Britain, MIA 19 November 1941 |
| Gauthier, Cleo | 5 | | |
| Godefroy, Hugh Constant ("Huey") | 7 + 3 probable | DSO, DFC, CdG | Dutch national. |
| Gordon, Donald Campbell "Chunky" | 11 | DFC* | |
| Gordon, Malcom James "Mac" | 8 | DFC | |
| Gosling, Leslie Cyril "Goose" | 10 | DFC | KIA 19 July 1943 |
| Graham, Malcolm Grant "Mac" | 5 | DFC* | |
| Grassick, Robert Davidson | 8 | | |

== H ==
| Name | Kills | Awards | Notes |
|---|---|---|---|
| Hall, Douglas Irving "Sammy" | 7 | DFC* | |
| Harling, David William Armstrong | 5 | | |
| Harten John Wilbert Edmund | 5 | | KIA 19 April 1945 |
| Hayward Robert Kitchener | 6 | DSO, DFC | |
| Hill, George Urquhart | 18 | DFC** | |
| Hoare, Thomas Harvey "Tom" | 5 | DFC | |
| Horricks, Garth Edwards | 9 | DFM | KIFA 1 July 1951 |
| Houle, Albert Ulrich | 13 | DFC*, CD | |
| Hughes, John Charles | 5 | | |
| Husband, Douglas Franklin | 6 | DFC | |

== I ==
| Name | Kills | Awards | Notes |
|---|---|---|---|
| Ingalls, Bruce Johnstone | 8 | DFC | KIA 16 June 1944 |

== J ==
| Name | Kills | Awards | Notes |
|---|---|---|---|
| Jamieson, David Robert Charles | 8 | | |
| Jasper, Clarence Murl | 4+3 V-1s | DFC | |
| Johnson, George William | 8 | DFC*, CD | |
| Johnson, James Robert Feir | 5 | | |
| Johnson, P G | 5+2 dam+1 prob | DFC | |
| Jones, Frank Everett | 4+2 sh+3 dam | DFC | |
| Jowsey, Milton Eardley | 5+1 prob+3 dam | DFC | |

== K ==
| Name | Kills | Awards | Notes |
|---|---|---|---|
| Keefer, George Clinton | 12 | DSO*, DFC, CdG, NFC | |
| Keith, George Noel | 9 | DFC | KIA 4 August 1943 |
| Kennedy, Irving Farmer "Hap" | 15 | DFC* | |
| Kent, John Alexander "Johnnie" | 12 | DFC*, AFC, VM | Battle of Britain |
| Kerr, James Bernard | 5 | | MIA 17 July 1944 |
| Kimball, Donald Harold | 6 | DFC | |
| Kipp, Robert Allan | 11 | DSO, DFC | KIFA 25 July 1949 |
| Kirkwood, Walter Gordon | 5 | DFC | |
| Klersy, William Thomas "Bill" | 15 | DSO, DFC* | +2 on ground. KIFA 22 May 1945 |

== L ==
| Name | Kills | Awards | Notes |
|---|---|---|---|
| Lake, Ronald George | 5 | | |
| Lapp, Esli Gordon | 6 | DFC | |
| Larichelière, Joseph Emil Paul | 6 | | Battle of Britain, MIA 16 August 1940 |
| Latta, John Blandford | 8 | DFC | Battle of Britain, KIA 12 January 1941 |
| Laubman, Donald Currie "Don" | 16 | AOE, DFC*, CD | POW 1945 |
| Lawrence, Arthur George | 5 | | |
| Leggat, P S | 1 + 9 V-1s | DFC, DFC (US) | |
| Lindsay, James Douglas "Doug" | 7 | DFC, DFC (US), CD | |
| Linton, Karl Raymond "Lucky" | 5 | DFC | |

== M ==
| Name | Kills | Awards | Notes |
|---|---|---|---|
| MacDonald, Harry Deane | 9 | DFC* | KIA 30 November 1943 |
| McElroy, John Frederick | 13 | | |
| MacFadyen, Donald Aikins | 7 | DSO, DFC* | |
| McGregor, Gordon Roy | 5 | DFC CdG | Battle of Britain |
| MacKay, John Mahachak | 12 | | |
| MacKenzie, Andrew Robert | 9 | | POW |
| Mackie, John Felton | 7 | | KIA 15 April 1941 |
| McKnight, William Lidstone "Willie" | 19 | DFC* | Battle of Britain, MIA 12 January 1941 |
| MacLennan, Ian Roy | 7 | | |
| McLeod, Henry Wallace "Wally" | 21 | | KIA 27 September 1944 |
| McNab, Ernest Archibald | 5 | OBE, DFC, CD | Battle of Britain |
| McNair, Robert Wendell "Buck" | 16 | DSO, DFC**, LoH, CdG | |
| McPhie, R A | 8 | | |
| Magwood, Charles McLaughlin | 6 | | |
| Main, Basil William "Rocky" | 5 | | KIA 4 February 1942 |
| Martyn, William Haig | 5 | | FAA |
| May, N S | 5 | | |
| Mitchell, Harry Thorpe | 7 | DFC | Battle of Britain |
| Mitchner, John Davidson | 11 | DFC* | |
| Moffett, H Bruce | 8 | | |
| Morrison. Donald Robert | 7 | | POW 1942 |
| Mott, Guy Elwood | 6 | | |
| Murray, Frederick Thomas | 5 | | POW 1945 |

== N ==
| Name | Kills | Awards | Notes |
|---|---|---|---|
| Neil, John William | 5 | DFC | POW 23 Aug 1944 |
| Nelson, William Henry | 5 | DFC | Battle of Britain, MIA 1 November 1940 |
| Ness, David Edward | 11 | DFC | |
| Noonan, Daniel Edward | 7 | DFC | |
| Northcott, Geoffrey Wilson "Jeff" | 9 | DSO, DFC* | |

== O ==
| Name | Kills | Awards | Notes |
|---|---|---|---|
| Ockenden, Gordon | 5 | | |
| Ogilvie, Alfred Keith "Skeets" | 6 | DFC | Battle of Britain, Later bailed out and taken POW 9 January 1941 |

== P ==
| Name | Kills | Awards | Notes |
|---|---|---|---|
| Patterson, Thomas Lawrence | 8 | | KIA 25 April 1941 |
| Pepper, George | 6 | DFC* | KIFA 17 November 1942 |
| Phipps, Rodney Thirsk | 6 | DFC | |

== R ==
| Name | Kills | Awards | Notes |
|---|---|---|---|
| Raphael, Gordon Learmouth "Raffy" | 9 | DSO, DFC* | KIA 10 April 1945 |
| Rathwell, Donald Westley | 5 | | |
| Reeves, McKenzie | 5 | | KIA 28 March 1945 |
| Reid, Donald George "Shorty" | 6 | DFM | KIA 22 July 1942 |
| Reid, Wilmer Harry | 5 | DFC | |
| Robertson, Graham David | 5 | DFC | |
| Robillard, Joseph Guillaume Laurent "Larry" | 7 | DFM | |
| Russel, Blair Dalzell "Dal" | 7 | DSO, DFC*, CdG | Battle of Britain |

== S ==
| Name | Kills | Awards | Notes |
|---|---|---|---|
| Sabourin, Joseph Jean Paul | 7 | DFC | KIA 16 September 1942 (El Alamein) |
| Sager, Arthur Hazelton | 6 | | |
| Sager, Henry (Hank) | 2 | | |
| Saphir, John | 5 | | |
| Schmidt, Dallas Wilbur | 9 | DFC* | |
| Schultz, Rayne Dennis "Joe" | 8 | | |
| Schwab, Lloyd Gilbert | 6 | | KIA 15 February 1960 |
| Sewell, William Richard Percival "Percy" | 5 | | KIFA 20 October 1943 (Italy) |
| Sheppard, Donald John | 6 | | FAA |
| Sheppard, Jackson Eddis | 5 | | |
| Smith, Albert Ivan | 5 | | |
| Smith, Forgrave Marshall "Hiram" | 5 | DFC | Battle of Britain |
| Smith, James Duncan "Smudger" | 8 | | Battle of Britain, KIA 14 April 1941 (Libya) |
| Smith, Roderick Illingworth Alpine | 14 | DFC* | |
| Smith, Robert Rutherford | 8 | DFC | POW 10 Mar 1943 Battle of Britain |
| Somerville, James Dean "Red" | 7 | DSO, DFC | |
| Stansfeld, Noel Karl | 7 | DFC*, Czech Medal for Bravery | Battle of Britain |
| Stowe, William North | 5 | | |

== T ==
| Name | Kills | Awards | Notes |
|---|---|---|---|
| Tamblyn, Hugh Norman | 6 | DFC | Battle of Britain, KIA 3 April 1941 |
| Trainor, Hugh Charles | 9 | DSO, DFC* | POW 19 Sep 1944 |
| Troke, Gordon William | 8 | DFC | POW 1944 |
| Turnbull, John Howard | 13 | DFC* | |
| Turner, Percival Stanley "Stan" | 14 | DSO, DFC* | Battle of Britain |

== U ==
| Name | Kills | Awards | Notes |
|---|---|---|---|
| Upton, Hamilton Charles "Derck" | 11 | DFC | Battle of Britain |
| Urwin-Mann, John Ronald "Jack" | 10 | DSO, DFC* | Battle of Britain |

== W ==
| Name | Kills | Awards | Notes |
|---|---|---|---|
| Walker, James Arthur "Johnnie" | 7 | DFC | Battle of Britain, KIA 8 February 1944 (Singapore) |
| Walker, James Elmslie "Jimmy" | 10 | DFC** | KIFA 25 April 1944 |
| Whalen, James Henry "Jimmy" | 6 | DFC | KIA 18 April 1944 |
| Williams, Alvin Thomas | 6 | | KIA 8 June 1940 |
| Williams, David John "Blackie" | 6 | DSO, DFC | |
| Williams, John William "Willie" | 9 | DFC | KIFA 30 October 1943 |
| Wilson, Frederick Albert William Johnson | 9 | | |
| Wonnacott, Gordon | 6 | DFC* | |
| Woods, Eric Norman "Timber" | 13 | DFC* | KIA 16 December 1943 |
| Woodward, Vernon Crompton "Woody" | 22 | DFC* | |

-

== Z ==
| Name | Kills | Awards | Notes |
|---|---|---|---|
| Zary, Henry Paul Michael "Hank" | 5 + 2 damaged on ground | DFC | |

== Notes ==
=== Abbreviations ===
- "KIA" in Notes means Killed in action (dates are included where possible).
- "KIFA" in Notes means Killed in Flying Accident.
- "MIA" in Notes means Missing in action.
- "WIA" in Notes means Wounded in action leading to death which, in some cases, may have occurred months later.
- "POW" in Notes means Prisoner of War.
- "FAA" in Notes denotes that the person served with the Fleet Air Arm, rather than with the Royal Air Force.
- "Battle of Britain" in Notes denotes that the person flew during the Battle of Britain and were awarded the Battle of Britain Clasp to the 1939-1945 Star by flying at least one authorised operational sortie with an eligible unit of the Royal Air Force or Fleet Air Arm during the period from 0001 hours on 10 July to 2359 hours 31 October 1940. See List of RAF aircrew in the Battle of Britain

=== Awards ===
| Award | Title | Notes |
|---|---|---|
| AE | Air Efficiency Award | Awarded for ten years' efficient service in the Royal Auxiliary Air Force |
| AFC | Air Force Cross | Awarded for "an act or acts of valour, courage or devotion to duty whilst flying, though not in active operations against the enemy". |
| CDeG | Croix de Guerre | A military decoration of both France and Belgium, also commonly bestowed to foreign military forces allied to France and Belgium. |
| DFC | Distinguished Flying Cross | Awarded to Royal Air Force commissioned officers and Warrant Officers for "an act or acts of valour, courage or devotion to duty whilst flying in active operations against the enemy". |
| DFC* | Distinguished Flying Cross and Bar | A bar is added to the ribbon for holders of the DFC who received a second award. |
| DFC** | Distinguished Flying Cross and Bar | A second bar is added to the ribbon for holders of the DFC and Bar who received a third award. |
| DFM | Distinguished Flying Medal | Awarded to military below commissioned rank, for "an act or acts of valour, courage or devotion to duty whilst flying in active operations against the enemy". |
| DSO | Distinguished Service Order | Awarded for meritorious or distinguished service by officers of the armed forces during wartime, typically in actual combat. |
| DSO* | Distinguished Service Order and Bar | A bar is added to the ribbon for holders of the DSO who received a second award. |
| MC | Military Cross | Awarded for "an act or acts of exemplary gallantry during active operations against the enemy on land to all members, of any rank". |
| MiD | Mentioned in Despatches | Awarded for gallantry or otherwise commendable service. |
| VC | Victoria Cross | Highest British military decoration, awarded for valour in the face of the enemy. |
| VM | Virtuti Militari | Highest Polish military award for courage in the face of the enemy |
