= List of World War I aces credited with 9 victories =

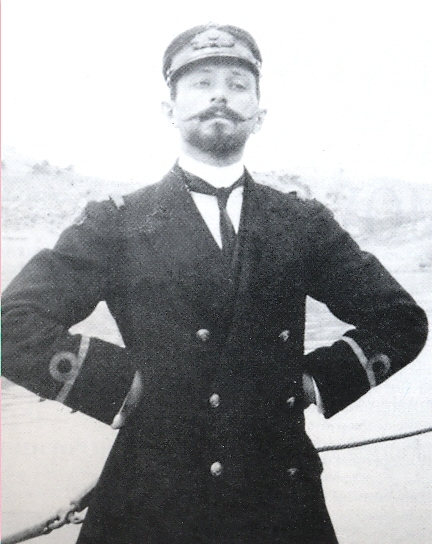
Aristeidis Moraitinis carried out the first naval-air operation in history in 1913.

The term ace (now commonly flying ace) was first used by French newspapers during World War I, describing Adolphe Pégoud as l'as ('the ace'), after he downed five German aircraft. When aircraft began to shoot or force down other aircraft, systems to count "air victories" were subsequently developed. The American qualification of five victories eventually became the standard, even though other air services had previously used differing figures.

While "ace" status was most often won by fighter pilots, bomber and reconnaissance crews, and observers in two-seater aircraft such as the Bristol F.2b ("Bristol Fighter"), also destroyed enemy aircraft. If a two-seater aircraft destroyed an aircraft, both crew members were credited with a victory. Because pilots usually teamed with differing observer/gunners in two-seater aircraft, an observer might be an ace when his pilot was not, and vice versa. The few aces among combat aviators have historically accounted for the majority of air-to-air victories in military history.

Loss of records by mischance and the passage of time complicates reconstructing the actual count for given aces. The scores presented in the list cannot be definitive, but are based on itemized lists that are the best available sources of information. Aces are listed after verifying the date and location of combat, and the foe vanquished, for every victory accredited by an aviator's home air service using their own aerial victory standards. Those victories for which the evidence is unavailable or fragmentary have been excluded from the victory count.

== Aces ==
This list is complete. Notable aces are linked to their biographies.

This along with the symbolic sword †, indicates that the pilot was known to be either killed in action, missing in action, died of wounds, or killed in a flying accident during World War I.

| Name | Country | Air service(s) | Victories |
|---|---|---|---|
| Cyril John Agelasto | United Kingdom | Royal Flying Corps, Royal Air Force (Note: In 1918 the Royal Flying Corps and Royal Navy Air Service were combined to form the Royal Air Force) | 9 |
| Ernst Freiherr von Althaus | German Empire | Luftstreitkräfte | 9 |
| Charles Arnison | United Kingdom | Royal Flying Corps, Royal Air Force | 9 |
| Paul Frank Baer | United States | Aéronautique Militaire, US Army Air Service | 9 |
| Harold H. Balfour | United Kingdom | Royal Flying Corps, Royal Air Force | 9 |
| Gottfried Freiherr von Banfield | Austria-Hungary | Luftfahrtruppen | 9 |
| William Thomas Barnes | United Kingdom | Royal Air Force | 9 |
| Walter Beales | United Kingdom | Royal Flying Corps, Royal Air Force | 9 |
| Rex George Bennett† | United Kingdom | Royal Flying Corps, Royal Air Force | 9 |
| Arno Benzler | German Empire | Luftstreitkräfte | 9 |
| James Binnie | United Kingdom | Royal Flying Corps, Royal Air Force | 9 |
| Fernand Bonneton | France | Aéronautique Militaire | 9 |
| John Denis Breakey | United Kingdom | Royal Naval Air Service, Royal Air Force | 9 |
| Konrad Brendle | German Empire | Luftstreitkräfte | 9 |
| Alexandre Bretillon | France | Aéronautique Militaire | 9 |
| Frederick Britnell | United Kingdom | Royal Naval Air Service, Royal Air Force | 9 |
| William Henry Brown | Canada | Royal Flying Corps, Royal Air Force | 9 |
| George William Bulmer | Canada | Royal Flying Corps, Royal Air Force | 9 |
| Francis Dominic Casey | United Kingdom | Royal Naval Air Service | 9 |
| Thomas Cassady | United States | Aéronautique Militaire, United States Army Air Service | 9 |
| Leonard Arthur Christian | Canada | Royal Naval Air Service, Royal Air Force | 9 |
| Arthur Coadou | France | Aéronautique Militaire | 9 |
| Théophile Henri Condemine | France | Aéronautique Militaire | 9 |
| Eric Douglas Cummings | Australia | Australian Flying Corps | 9 |
| Donald Cunnell | United Kingdom | Royal Flying Corps | 9 |
| Hector Daniel | South Africa | Royal Flying Corps, Royal Air Force, South African Air Force | 9 |
| George Darvill | United Kingdom | Royal Flying Corps, Royal Air Force | 9 |
| Richard Dawes | Canada | Royal Flying Corps, Royal Air Force | 9 |
| Roger Del'Haye | Canada | Royal Flying Corps, Royal Air Force, Royal Canadian Air Force | 9 |
| Marcel Marc Dhome | France | Aéronautique Militaire | 9 |
| Albert Dietlen | German Empire | Luftstreitkräfte | 9 |
| George Dixon | Canada | Royal Flying Corps, Royal Air Force | 9 |
| Gustave Douchy | France | Aéronautique Militaire | 9 |
| René Dousinelle | France | Aéronautique Militaire | 9 |
| John Doyle | United Kingdom | Royal Flying Corps, Royal Air Force | 9 |
| Christopher Draper | United Kingdom | Royal Naval Air Service, Royal Air Force | 9 |
| Arthur Thomas Drinkwater | Australia | Royal Flying Corps, Royal Air Force | 9 |
| Otto Fitzner | German Empire | Luftstreitkräfte | 9 |
| James Henry Forman | Canada | Royal Naval Air Service, Royal Air Force | 9 |
| Frederick Gordon | New Zealand | Royal Flying Corps, Royal Air Force | 9 |
| Robert MacIntyre Gordon | United Kingdom | Royal Naval Air Service, Royal Air Force | 9 |
| Acheson Goulding | Canada | Royal Flying Corps, Royal Air Force, Royal Canadian Air Force | 9 |
| William Edward Green | United Kingdom | Royal Flying Corps, Royal Air Force | 9 |
| George Hackwill | United Kingdom | Royal Flying Corps, Royal Air Force | 9 |
| James Hardman | United Kingdom | Royal Flying Corps, Royal Air Force | 9 |
| Friedrich Huffzky | German Empire | Luftstreitkräfte | 9 |
| Frederick Hunt | United Kingdom | Royal Air Force | 9 |
| Otto Jindra | Austria-Hungary | Luftfahrtruppen, Czech Air Force | 9 |
| Reginald Johns | United Kingdom | Royal Naval Air Service, Royal Air Force | 9 |
| Norman Cyril Jones | United Kingdom | Royal Flying Corps, Royal Air Force | 9 |
| Georg Kenzian | Austria-Hungary | Luftfahrtruppen | 9 |
| Harold Spencer Kerby | Canada | Royal Naval Air Service, Royal Air Force | 9 |
| Leslie Walter King | United Kingdom | Royal Flying Corps, Royal Air Force | 9 |
| Francis Kitto | United Kingdom | Royal Flying Corps, Royal Air Force | 9 |
| Herbert Knappe | German Empire | Luftstreitkräfte | 9 |
| Egon Koepsch | German Empire | Luftstreitkräfte | 9 |
| Fritz Kosmahl | German Empire | Luftstreitkräfte | 9 |
| Walter Kypke | German Empire | Luftstreitkräfte | 9 |
| Georges Lachmann | France | Aéronautique Militaire | 9 |
| Helmut Lange | German Empire | Luftstreitkräfte | 9 |
| Jens Frederick Larsen | United States | Royal Flying Corps, Royal Air Force | 9 |
| Charles Lavers | United Kingdom | Royal Flying Corps, Royal Air Force | 9 |
| George V. Learmond | United Kingdom | Royal Flying Corps, Royal Air Force | 9 |
| Gustav Leffers | German Empire | Luftstreitkräfte | 9 |
| James Leith Leith | United Kingdom | Royal Flying Corps, Royal Air Force | 9 |
| Selden Long | United Kingdom | Royal Flying Corps, Royal Air Force | 9 |
| Cyril Lowe | United Kingdom | Royal Flying Corps, Royal Air Force | 9 |
| Norman Macmillan | United Kingdom | Royal Flying Corps, Royal Air Force | 9 |
| Herbert Mahn | German Empire | Luftstreitkräfte | 9 |
| Cecil Marchant | United Kingdom | Royal Flying Corps, Royal Air Force | 9 |
| Jean Matton | France | Aéronautique Militaire | 9 |
| Ronald Mauduit | United Kingdom | Royal Flying Corps, Royal Air Force | 9 |
| Reginald Maxwell | United Kingdom | Royal Flying Corps, Royal Air Force | 9 |
| John Sutholand McDonald | United Kingdom | Royal Flying Corps, Royal Air Force | 9 |
| Christopher McEvoy | United Kingdom | Royal Flying Corps, Royal Air Force | 9 |
| David MacKay McGoun | Canada | Royal Flying Corps, Royal Air Force | 9 |
| Horace Merritt | United Kingdom | Royal Flying Corps, Royal Air Force | 9 |
| John Theobald Milne | United Kingdom | Royal Flying Corps | 9 |
| Eberhard Mohnicke | German Empire | Luftstreitkräfte | 9 |
| Basil Moody | South Africa | Royal Flying Corps, Royal Air Force | 9 |
| Aristeidis Moraitinis | Greece | Hellenic Naval Air Service, Royal Naval Air Service | 9 |
| Hans Karl Müller | German Empire | Luftstreitkräfte | 9 |
| Richard Burnard Munday | United Kingdom | Royal Naval Air Service, Royal Air Force | 9 |
| Charles Napier | United Kingdom | Royal Flying Corps, Royal Air Force | 9 |
| Giovanni Nicelli | Italy | Corpo Aeronautico Militare | 9 |
| Ernest Norton | United Kingdom | Royal Naval Air Service, Royal Air Force | 9 |
| Arthur Noss | United Kingdom | Royal Flying Corps | 9 |
| Conn Standish O'Grady | United Kingdom | Royal Flying Corps | 9 |
| Samuel Parry | United Kingdom | Royal Flying Corps, Royal Air Force | 9 |
| Karl Pech | German Empire | Luftstreitkräfte | 9 |
| Henri Albert Péronneau | France | Aéronautique Militaire | 9 |
| Edmond Pierce | United Kingdom | Royal Naval Air Service, Royal Air Force | 9 |
| Frank Ransley | United Kingdom | Royal Flying Corps, Royal Air Force | 9 |
| Valentine Reed | United Kingdom | Royal Flying Corps | 9 |
| William Reed | United Kingdom | Royal Flying Corps, Royal Air Force | 9 |
| George Reid | United Kingdom | Royal Flying Corps, Royal Air Force | 9 |
| William Wendell Rogers | Canada | Royal Flying Corps, Royal Air Force | 9 |
| Willi Rosenstein | German Empire | Luftstreitkräfte | 9 |
| Herbert Rowley | United Kingdom | Royal Naval Air Service, Royal Air Force | 9 |
| Ernest James Salter | Canada | Royal Flying Corps, Royal Air Force | 9 |
| Karl Schattauer | German Empire | Luftstreitkräfte | 9 |
| Adolf Schulte | German Empire | Luftstreitkräfte | 9 |
| Joseph Siddall | United Kingdom | Royal Naval Air Service, Royal Air Force | 9 |
| Charles Sims | United Kingdom | Royal Naval Air Service, Royal Air Force | 9 |
| Arthur Solly | United Kingdom | Royal Flying Corps | 9 |
| Anthony Spence | Canada | Royal Naval Air Service, Royal Air Force | 9 |
| Grigoriy Suk | Russia | Imperial Army Air Service | 9 |
| Mathieu Tenant de la Tour | France | Aéronautique Militaire | 9 |
| Louis Mark Thompson | Canada | Royal Flying Corps, Royal Air Force | 9 |
| Ronald Thornely | United Kingdom | Royal Flying Corps, Royal Naval Air Service, Royal Air Force | 9 |
| Frederick Dudley Travers | United Kingdom | Royal Naval Air Service, Royal Air Force | 9 |
| Ronald William Turner | United Kingdom | Royal Flying Corps, Royal Air Force | 9 |
| Ferdinand Udvardy | Austria-Hungary | Luftfahrtruppen | 9 |
| Marcel Vialet | France | Aéronautique Militaire | 9 |
| Guy Wareing | United Kingdom | Royal Flying Corps, Royal Air Force | 9 |
| Kenneth Bowman Watson | Canada | Royal Flying Corps, Royal Air Force | 9 |
| Albert Edward Wear | United Kingdom | Royal Flying Corps | 9 |
| Georg Weiner | German Empire | Luftstreitkräfte, Luftwaffe | 9 |
| Thomas Williams | South Africa | Royal Flying Corps, Royal Air Force | 9 |
| Alec Williamson | United Kingdom | Royal Flying Corps, Royal Air Force | 9 |
| Chester Wright | United States | United States Army Air Service | 9 |
