= William Benson Craig =

Canadian World War I flying ace

- Born: 2 August 1896; Smiths Falls, Ontario, Canada
- Died: 26 September 1918 (aged 22) off Blankenberge, Belgium
- Burial place: Blankenberge Town Cemetery, Blankenberge, Belgium
- Military career
- Allegiance: Canada; United Kingdom
- Branch: Canadian Expeditionary Force; Royal Flying Corps
- Service years: 1917–1918
- Rank: Lieutenant
- Unit: 4 Naval Squadron RNAS/No. 204 Squadron RAF
- Awards: Distinguished Flying Cross

Lieutenant William Benson Craig DFC (2 August 1896 – 26 September 1918) was a Canadian flying ace during World War I. He was credited with eight aerial victories over German fighter planes.

== Early life ==
William Craig Benson was born in Smiths Falls, Ontario, Canada on 2 August 1896; his father was Richard Craig. He was working as a clerk when he enlisted in the 73rd Field Artillery Battery of the Canadian Expeditionary Force on 21 May 1917. He was five feet four inches tall, with black hair, brown eyes, and a swarthy complexion.

== World War I ==
Craig transferred to the Royal Naval Air Service and was posted to 4 Naval Squadron as a Sopwith Camel pilot in May 1918. He scored his first aerial victories over German fighter planes on 15 August 1918, and in just over a month, ran his total to eight, all against fighters. On 26 September 1918, two days after his final victory, he was killed in action off-shore of Blankenberge, Belgium. He was posthumously awarded the Distinguished Flying Cross on 5 October 1918, though it would not be gazetted until 1 November 1918, ten days before war's end:

Whilst acting temporarily as flight leader on one day last month he personally destroyed three enemy machines, and the remainder of his flight accounted for three more. Lt. Craig has been engaged in numerous air battles, and always displays fine spirit, ability and determination in carrying out his duties. He has personally brought down two enemy machines completely out of control, in addition to those referred to above.

William Benson Craig was buried in Plot B.3, Blankenberge Communal Cemetery, Blankenberge, Belgium.

== List of aerial victories ==
No.	Date/time	Aircraft	Foe	Result	Location
1	15 August 1918 @ 0825 hours	Sopwith Camel serial number D9268	Fokker D.VII fighter	Set afire in midair; destroyed	East of Ypres
2	15 August 1918 @ 0825 hours	Sopwith Camel s/n D9268	Fokker D.VII fighter	Destroyed	East of Ypres
3	16 September 1918 @ 1905 hours	Sopwith Camel s/n D3374	Fokker D.VII fighter	Destroyed	Blankenberge
4	16 September 1918 @ 1907 hours	Sopwith Camel s/n D3374	Fokker D.VII fighter	Driven down out of control	Blankenberge
5	16 September 1918 @ 1910 hours	Sopwith Camel s/n D3374	Fokker D.VII fighter	Driven down out of control	Blankenberge
6	20 September 1918 @ 1025 hours	Sopwith Camel s/n D3374	Fokker D.VII fighter	Driven down out of control	Northeast of Diksmuide
7	20 September 1918 @ 1030 hours	Sopwith Camel s/n D3374	Fokker D.VII fighter	Driven down out of control	Southwest of Ostend
8	24 September 1918 @ 1845 hours	Sopwith Camel s/n D3374	Fokker Triplane	Set afire in midair; destroyed	Diksmuide
