= Camille Lagesse =

Canadian First World War flying ace

Camille Henri Raoul Lagesse
- Born: 10 January 1893; Curepipe, Mauritius
- Died: 15 February 1976 (aged 83); Nice, France
- Military career
- Allegiance: George V
- Branch: RAF
- Rank: Captain
- Unit: No. 29 Squadron RAF
- Awards: Distinguished Flying Cross

Camille Henri Raoul Lagesse DFC & Bar (10 January 1893–15 February 1976) was a Canadian First World War flying ace, officially credited with 20 victories.

== Text of citations ==
=== Distinguished Flying Cross ===
"Lt. (T./Capt.) Camille Henri Raoul Lagesse. When on wireless interception duty, Capt. Lagesse, in company with another officer, was attacked by seven scouts. Engaging one, he followed it down from 11,000 feet to 2,000 feet, when it crashed. Bold in attack, skilful in execution, he has proved himself on many occasions to be a fine airman."

=== Distinguished Flying Cross - Bar ===
"Lieut. (A../Capt.) Camille Henri Raoul Lagesse, D.F.C. (FRANCE) A scout leader of marked ability and daring who, since 28 August, has destroyed thirteen enemy aeroplanes, displaying at all times leadership and combat experience. On 2 October, when leading a patrol of four machines, he dived on eight Fokkers; four of these were destroyed, Captain Lagesse accounting for one."
