= William John Gillespie =

- Born: 20 March 1897; Beaverton, Ontario, Canada
- Died: August 6, 1967 (aged 70); Edmonton, Alberta, Canada
- Military career
- Allegiance: Canada; United Kingdom
- Branch: Royal Flying Corps
- Rank: Lieutenant
- Unit: No. 41 Squadron RAF
- Awards: French Croix de Guerre

Lieutenant William John Gillespie was a World War I flying ace credited with five aerial victories.

Gillespie was a student at Daysland, Alberta before joining the military. He was posted to 41 Squadron on 11 December 1917. He scored five victories between 25 March and 7 July 1918; all of them were of the "driven down out of control" type. On 18 August 1918, he was hospitalized with influenza and sat out the duration of the war. Gillespie returned to Canada and died in Edmonton in 1967.

== Sources ==
- Above the Trenches: a Complete Record of the Fighter Aces and Units of the British Empire Air Forces 1915-1920. Christopher F. Shores, Norman L. R. Franks, Russell Guest. Grub Street, 1990. ISBN 0-948817-19-4, 9780948817199.
