= Lynn Campbell =

Canadian military aviator

- Born: Colin Roudolph Campbell; June 10, 1896; Chicago, Illinois, USA
- Died: October 9, 1918 (aged 22); France
- Burial place: Preseau Communal Cemetery, Nord, France
- Military career
- Allegiance: United Kingdom
- Branch: Royal Flying Corps, Royal Air Force
- Service years: 1917-1918
- Rank: Captain
- Unit: No. 62 Squadron RAF
- Memorials: Campbell Headstone, Hamilton Cemetery

Captain Colin "Lynn" Roudolph Campbell (1896–1918) was a Canadian military aviator during the First World War.

== Early life ==
Lynn Campbell was born June 10, 1896, in Chicago, Illinois. His father was an American, Newton Campbell, and his mother, Mary Ford Campbell, was British-Canadian. Lynn spent much of his early childhood in South Carolina, before moving with his family to Hamilton, Ontario at the age of 14. He worked as an electrician in Hamilton from June 1915 to May 1917.

== World War I ==
Campbell joined the Royal Flying from Toronto on May 19, 1917. He destroyed 3 enemy aircraft and sent 4 out of control while flying Bristol F.2 Fighters in the No. 62 Squadron RAF. He was shot down and killed on October 9, 1918, over France. Initially reported as missing, he was eventually confirmed dead, and buried in Preseau.
