= Hugh Tamblyn =

Canadian flying ace of WWII

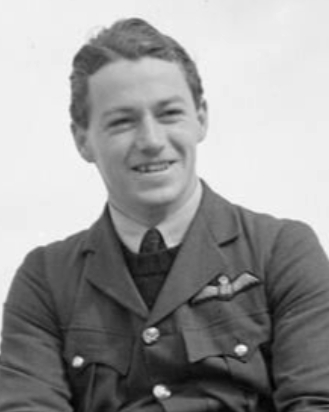
- Born: 5 September 1917; Watrous, Saskatchewan, Canada
- Died: 3 April 1941 (aged 23); English Channel
- Burial place: Ipswich New Cemetery, Ipswich, England
- Military career
- Allegiance: United Kingdom
- Branch: Royal Air Force
- Rank: Flight Lieutenant
- Units: No. 141 Squadron; No. 242 Squadron
- Conflicts: Second World War: Battle of Britain; Circus offensive
- Awards: Distinguished Flying Cross

Hugh Tamblyn, DFC (5 September 1917 – 3 April 1941) was a Canadian flying ace of the Royal Air Force (RAF) during the Second World War. He is credited with the destruction of at least five aircraft.

From Saskatchewan in Canada, Tamblyn joined the RAF in 1938. Shortly after the outbreak of the Second World War, he was posted to No. 141 Squadron and during the early stages of the Battle of Britain, he flew the Boulton Paul Defiant turret fighter. Later in the battle, he was assigned to No. 242 Squadron with which he claimed the majority of his aerial victories. The following year, he was involved in the Circus offensive. He died on operations on 3 April 1941, two days after being invested with the Distinguished Flying Cross.

== Early life ==
Hugh Norman Tamblyn was born at Watrous, Saskatchewan, in Canada on 5 September 1917 to Norman Tamblyn, a bank manager, and his wife Ethel. He attended Burke Public School before going on to Yorktown Collegiate School and then Calgary's Provincial Institute of Technology. In early 1938, he joined the Royal Air Force (RAF) on a short service commission.

Already able to fly by virtue of having learnt while he worked as an aircraft mechanic in Saskatchewan, Tamblyn commenced his training in April as an acting pilot officer. Once this was completed he was posted to No. 7 Bombing and Gunnery School where he served as a staff pilot. He was confirmed in his pilot officer rank the following year.

== Second World War ==
In December 1939, Tamblyn was posted to the newly formed No. 141 Squadron. Based at Turnhouse, this was formed as the RAF's second squadron to operate the Boulton Paul Defiant turret fighter but at the time Tamblyn arrived, it had yet to receive its full complement of the aircraft due to production delays. Some pilots had to train on Bristol Blenheims and Fairey Battles. The Defiants began arriving in April and the squadron became operational on 9 July with a move south, to West Malling.

=== Battle of Britain ===
During the early stages of the Battle of Britain, No. 141 Squadron was engaged in patrols over the English Channel, staging from Hawkinge. On 19 July, nine Defiants, Tamblyn's among them, were scrambled to intercept German bombers heading towards shipping transiting the English Channel. The Defiants were intercepted by Messerschmitt Bf 109 fighters, which shot down or severely damaged seven of the British fighters. Tamblyn escaped with his aircraft undamaged, and he and his gunner, Sergeant S. Powell, combined to shoot down a Bf 109 several miles off Folkestone. As a result of its losses, the squadron was withdrawn and sent north to Prestwick to recover.

In August Tamblyn was posted to No. 242 Squadron. Based at Coltishall, the unit operated the Hawker Hurricane fighter and was becoming increasingly involved in the aerial fighting over London and southeast England. Tamblyn, who had been promoted to flying officer earlier in the month, shot down a Messerschmitt Bf 110 heavy fighter near Chelmsford and also probably destroyed a Bf 109 on 7 September. Two days later he destroyed two Bf 110s over south London. On 15 September, now known as Battle of Britain Day, he shared in the destruction of a Dornier Do 17 medium bomber to the southeast of Hornchurch. Tambyn damaged a Bf 109 over the English Channel on 27 September.

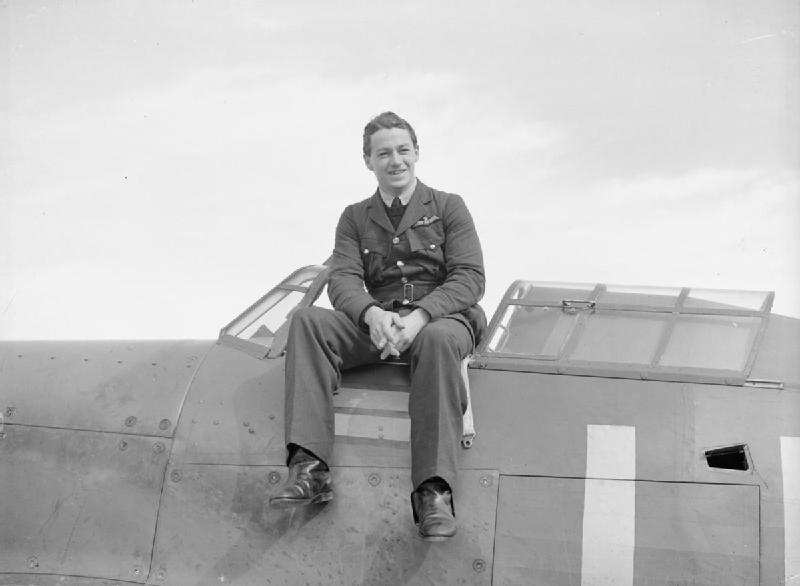
Tamblyn with a Hawker Hurricane fighter of No. 242 Squadron

By October, the Luftwaffe was decreasing its operations over England and No. 242 Squadron started carrying out night fighter operations from Duxford. Tamblyn was recognised for his successes in the fighting over England with an award of the Distinguished Flying Cross (DFC) on 7 January 1941. The citation, published in The London Gazette, read:

Flying Officer Tamblyn has shown the greatest keenness to engage the enemy and has destroyed at least five of their aircraft. He has set a splendid example to the other members of his section.

— London Gazette, No. 35037, 7 January 1941

=== Circus offensive ===
In early 1941, No. 242 Squadron began carrying out offensive operations to German-occupied France as part of the RAF's Circus offensive as well as convoy patrols. On 25 February, Tamblyn damaged a Do 17. He was invested with his DFC by King George VI in a ceremony at Buckingham Palace on 1 April. Two days later he was on a patrol near Felixstowe when his Hurricane was damaged in an engagement with the Luftwaffe. He came down in the English Channel but died of exposure before he could be rescued. At the time of his death, he held the rank of flight lieutenant.

Tamblyn's body was recovered and he is buried at Ipswich New Cemetery in Ipswich. He is credited with having destroyed six German aircraft, one shared with another pilot, and the probable destruction of a seventh. He also damaged two aircraft.
