= Kenneth Burns Conn =

- Born: 11 July 1896; Ashton, Ontario, Canada
- Died: 30 January 1984 (aged 87); Toronto, Ontario, Canada
- Military career
- Allegiance: George V
- Branch: Royal Flying Corps, Royal Air Force
- Rank: Lieutenant
- Units: 234th (Peel) Battalion, CEF, No. 88 Squadron RAF
- Awards: Distinguished Flying Cross

Kenneth Burns Conn DFC (11 July 1896 – 30 January 1984) was a Canadian First World War flying ace, officially credited with 20 victories.

== Text of citations ==
=== Distinguished Flying Cross ===
"Lt. Kenneth Burns Conn (3rd Res. Bn., Can. E.F.). (FRANCE) On 18 October, when raiding enemy troops in retreat, this officer descended to 300 feet and attacked three companies of infantry with machine-gun fire, inflicting casualties. So vigorous was his attack that the troops dispersed. Lt. Conn then attacked various other targets, displaying conspicuous skill and initiative."
