= Norman Craig Millman =

Canadian flying ace

- Born: 30 March 1890
- Died: 27 July 1981 (aged 91)
- Military career
- Allegiance: Canada; British Empire
- Branch: Royal Flying Corps
- Rank: Captain
- Unit: No. 48 Squadron RAF
- Awards: Military Cross; Air Force Cross

Captain Norman Craig Millman was a Canadian First World War flying ace credited with six aerial victories.

He joined the Royal Flying Corps in May 1916. He began his pilot's career as an instructor and test pilot. He was posted to 48 Squadron to fly a Bristol F.2 Fighter on 20 August 1917. He became a flight commander, then rose to command the unit. While there, he drove six enemy planes down out of control between 11 November 1917 and 8 March 1918. He left the squadron in May 1918, and became an instructor back in England. He was awarded the Military Cross the following month, with the citation, appearing in The London Gazette in June, reading as follows:

For conspicuous gallantry and devotion to duty. Whilst on offensive patrol, he encountered a hostile formation of 12 machines. He led his patrol in such brilliant fashion that five of the enemy machines were shot down either in flames or out of control, two of these being accounted for by himself and his observer. Previously to this, he had carried out voluntarily a reconnaissance, from which he succeeded in returning with most valuable information, despite the fact that he had been heavily engaged by machine-gun fire during the greater part of the flight. Later, he commanded a formation on one flank of the attack during a daylight bombing raid on a hostile aerodrome, and carried out his task in a most dashing and successful manner. He has at all times displayed powers of leadership of the highest order.
