= Joseph E. Hallonquist =

Joseph Eskel Hallonquist
- Born: 13 April 1895; Mission City, British Columbia, Canada
- Died: 22 August 1958 (aged 63); Moose Jaw, Saskatchewan, Canada
- Military career
- Allegiance: Canada; United Kingdom
- Branch: Canadian Expeditionary Force; Royal Flying Corps
- Rank: Captain
- Unit: No. 28 Squadron RAF
- Awards: Distinguished Flying Cross, Italian Medal for Military Valor

Captain Joseph Eskel Hallonquist (13 April 1895 - 22 August 1958) was a World War I flying ace credited with five aerial victories.

When World War I began, Hallonquist was chief clerk of a bank in British Columbia. He joined the 19th Reserve Battalion of the Canadian Expeditionary Force, only to transfer to the Royal Flying Corps. He trained with 26 and 73 Squadrons before being posted on 23 January 1918 to 28 Squadron in Italy as an Honorary Captain. He opened his victory roll on 17 April 1918. His fourth confirmed win on 13 July downed Austro-Hungarian ace Ferdinand Udvardy; although Hallonquist was credited with a destruction, Udvardy survived. On 29 October 1918, Hallonquist was shot down by anti-aircraft fire. He spent a short period as a prisoner of war before returning to Canada.
