= Donald MacFadyen =

Canadian flying ace of WWII

- Born: 18 December 1920; Montreal, Canada
- Died: 3 December 2009 (aged 88); Ontario, Canada
- Military career
- Allegiance: Canada
- Branch: Royal Canadian Air Force
- Rank: Squadron Leader
- Units: No. 418 Squadron; No. 406 Squadron
- Conflicts: Second World War
- Awards: Distinguished Service Order; Distinguished Flying Cross & Bar

Donald MacFadyen (18 December 1920 – 3 December 2009) was a Canadian flying ace of the Royal Canadian Air Force (RCAF) during the Second World War. He was credited with the destruction of at least seven aircraft and five V-1 flying bombs.

From Montreal, MacFadyen joined the RCAF in May 1940. Once his training was completed, he became a flying instructor. In December 1943, having been sent to the United Kingdom a few months prior, he was posted to No. 418 Squadron. Flying a de Havilland Mosquito heavy fighter on intruder sorties to German-occupied Europe he claimed several aerial victories and his successes were recognised with an award of the Distinguished Flying Cross (DFC). Rested from operations from mid- to late-1944, he then resumed operations with a posting to No. 406 Squadron, again flying Mosquitos. He achieved more successes over France and Germany, receiving a Bar to his DFC and the Distinguished Service Order. Released from the RCAF in late 1945, he later worked in geophysical surveying. He died in Ontario, at the age of 88.

== Early life ==
Donald Aikins MacFadyen was born on 18 December 1920 in Montreal, in Canada. Once his schooling was completed, he went on to study at the University of Toronto.

== Second World War ==
MacFadyen joined the Royal Canadian Air Force (RCAF) in May 1940 to train as a pilot. He gained his 'wings' in November but was selected to train as an instructor rather than proceed to an operational posting. He went to the Central Flying School at Trenton before commencing instructing duties. In April 1943, MacFadyen was posted to Ferry Command, by this time holding the rank of flight lieutenant. The following month he embarked for the United Kingdom to serve with the Royal Air Force (RAF), and once there, was assigned to No. 12 Advanced Flying Unit. In September he was posted to No. 60 Operational Training Unit (OTU) for three months.

=== Service with No. 418 Squadron ===
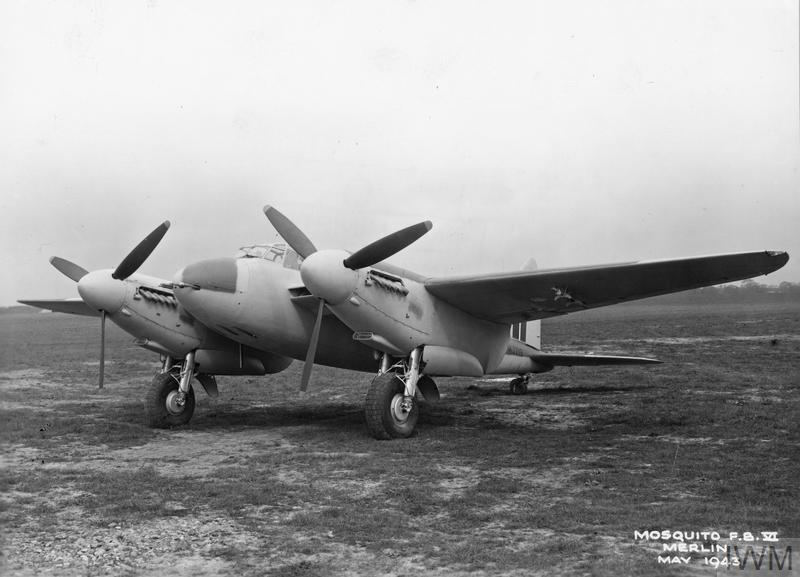
A de Havilland of Mosquito of No. 418 Squadron, 1943

In December 1943, MacFadyen received his first operational posting, when he was sent to No. 418 Squadron. This was the RACF's only intruder unit and, based at Ford, was equipped with de Havilland Mosquito heavy fighters. It carried out intruder missions targeting Luftwaffe airfields and transportation infrastructure. MacFadyen, who was paired with Flying Officer J. Wright as his navigator and radar operator, achieved his first aerial victory on the night of 22 December, probably destroying a twin-engined aircraft over the airfield at Orléans. Inclement weather affected the squadron's operations during the remaining weeks of the year and into early 1944. On 24 February, MacFadyen and Wright, while on a sortie over German airfields, shot down a Messerschmitt Me 410 heavy fighter.

On 21 March, MacFadyen and Wright carried out an attack on Haguenau airfield in eastern France. They and another crew of No. 418 Squadron caught several aircraft on the ground; MacFadyen destroyed a Dornier Do 217 medium bomber and a Gotha Go 242 glider on the ground. He also damaged eight other Go 242s. MacFadyen then flew to Luxeuil airfield and there he shot down a Bücker Bü 131 trainer aircraft as it attempted to land. He destroyed a Heinkel He 111Z glider tug at Saint-Yan airfield on the night of 2 May, and damaged another aircraft that was unable to be identified. The engine of his Mosquito was hit by ground fire during the attack but MacFadyen was able to bring the aircraft back to safety. On 12 May it was formally announced that MacFadyen was to be awarded the Distinguished Flying Cross (DFC) for his exploits over the previous months. The citation for his DFC was published in The London Gazette and read:

This officer has participated in many sorties and has destroyed 4 enemy aircraft and damaged several more. He has displayed great skill and courage throughout his tour and his example of keenness and determination has been most commendable.

— London Gazette, No. 36511, 12 May 1944

On the night of 6 June, MacFadyen shot down a Junkers Ju 52 transport to the north of Coulommiers airfield. A week later, No. 418 Squadron was one of those tasked with intercepting V-1 flying bombs as part of Operation Diver, the RAF's campaign against these weapons. MacFadyen was the first pilot of the squadron to achieve a success against a V-1, destroying two near Dungeness on the night of 16 June. He destroyed three more V-1s over the English Channel on the night of 6 July.

=== Service with No. 406 Squadron ===
Later in July, MacFadyen was rested from operations and was posted back to No. 60 OTU on instructing duties but was transferred to No. 54 OTU the following month. In November he joined No. 406 Squadron. Based at Manston, it was equipped with Mosquitos and tasked with intruding duties. On the night of 21 February 1945, MacFadyen, who was now paired with Flight Lieutenant V. Shail as his navigator, destroyed a Messerschmitt Bf 110 night fighter as it prepared to land at Störmede airfield . A week later he caught and probably destroyed a Junkers Ju 88 parked up at Hailfingen airfield. Flying at low level during the attack, his own Mosquito was damaged by debris thrown up by the Ju 88.

On the night of 3 March, MacFadyen and Shail sortied to Czechoslovakia and attacked an airfield at České Budějovice. There they destroyed one Focke Wulf 190 fighter on the ground and damaged three others. Two nights later they flew to southern Germany and at Gerolzhofen, shot down a Ju 88, which crashed into the River Main. A return to Czechoslovakia on the night of 24 March saw MacFadyen destroy one He 111 and damaged four others on the ground at Bystrice landing ground near Prague. On the night of 9 April, he shot down a pair of Ju 88s within minutes of each other near Lübeck. The second of these was believed to be No. 406 Squadron's 50th aerial victory. Towards the end of April, he was awarded a Bar to his DFC; this was in "recognition of gallantry and devotion to duty in the execution of air operations". He was also promoted to acting squadron leader.

On a sortie to attack the airfield at Eferding, carried out on the night of 24 April, MacFadyen damaged a Ju 88 on the ground. This was his final claim of the war and once hostilities in Europe ended, the squadron relocated to Predannack. MacFayden was repatriated to Canada in September. The following month he was appointed to the Distinguished Service Order. The citation for his DSO specifically mentioned his exploits at Bystrice landing ground on 24 March. He was discharged from the RCAF on 25 October.

== Later life ==
On his return to civilian life, MacFadyen found employment with Kenting Aviation and carried out aerial mapping. He was an early proponent of the use of this technique for identifying deposits of magnetic minerals. He later worked for geophysical surveying companies and studied gemology, becoming a fellow of the Canadian and British Gemological Associations. Having retired to Ontario, MacFadyen died at his home on 3 December 2009. He was survived by his wife and two children.

MacFadyen is credited with having destroyed seven aircraft and five V-1 flying bombs, and one aircraft deemed to have been probably destroyed. He destroyed five more aircraft on the ground, as well as one probably destroyed and seventeen damaged.
