= Albert Houle =

Canadian flying ace of WWII

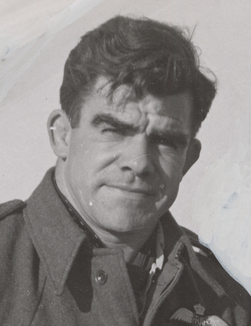
- Born: 24 March 1914; Massey, Ontario, Canada
- Died: 1 June 2008 (aged 94); Mannotick, Ontario, Canada
- Burial place: National Military Cemetery
- Military career
- Allegiance: Canada
- Branch: Royal Canadian Air Force
- Service years: 1940–1944; 1946–1965
- Rank: Group Captain
- Commands: No. 417 Squadron; Central Experimental and Proving Establishment
- Conflicts: Second World War: North African campaign; Operation Husky; Battle of Anzio
- Awards: Distinguished Flying Cross and Bar; Canadian Forces' Decoration

Albert Houle, DFC & Bar, CD (24 March 1914 – 1 June 2008) was a Canadian flying ace of the Royal Canadian Air Force (RAF) during the Second World War. He is credited with the destruction of at least thirteen aircraft.

From Massey, in Ontario, Houle worked in the mining industry before he joined the RCAF in September 1940. After his flight training was completed in Canada, he went to the United Kingdom to serve with the Royal Air Force. After ferrying a Hawker Hurricane fighter to Egypt in September 1941, he was posted to No. 213 Squadron. He claimed his first aerial victories in the El Alamein sector, and was awarded the Distinguished Flying Cross for an engagement in which he either destroyed or damaged five German aircraft. He later served with No. 145 Squadron before being rested in February 1943. Houle returned to operations in June with the RCAF's No. 417 Squadron, which participated in the invasion of Sicily and operations in Italy. He claimed several more aerial victories, and was commander of the squadron by the end of the year. Awarded a Bar to his DFC, he was wounded in his final aerial engagement and rested in February 1944. Repatriated to Canada, he was not allowed to return to operations and resigned from the RCAF. He rejoined the RCAF in 1946 and, after gaining a postgraduate degree in aeronautical engineering, was involved in testing and developing aircraft for nearly 20 years. He retired from the RCAF in 1965 as a group captain and took up commercial flying. Ill with Alzheimer’s Disease, he died on 1 June 2008 at the age of 94.

== Early life ==
Albert Urlich Houle was born on 24 March 1914 in Massey, Ontario, in Canada, one of five children of a farmer. He studied electrical engineering at the University of Toronto, also representing the institution in boxing and wrestling. Once he completed his studies, he worked in Northern Ontario as an electrician but lost his job when the mine where he was employed closed down. He returned to his alma mater to teach for a time before finding employment in the mining industry in 1938.

== Second World War ==
Houle joined the Royal Canadian Air Force (RCAF) in September 1940. He was keen to play a part in the war and to minimise the risk of being medically rejected for active service, he proactively had his tonsils removed and his teeth checked prior to enlisting. His initial flying training commenced in January 1941 when he was sent to No. 32 Service Flying Training School at Moose Jaw in Saskatchewan. He gained his 'wings' in April and two months later was posted to the United Kingdom to serve with the Royal Air Force (RAF). After attending No. 55 Operational Training Unit (OTU) at Usworth to train on the Hawker Hurricane fighter, he was posted to the Middle East. Commissioned as a pilot officer, in August, he embarked on the aircraft carrier HMS Furious, which was transporting several Hurricanes to the Middle East. These and their ferry pilots, which included Houle, were transferred to HMS Ark Royal at Gibraltar. They were then flown off the Ark Royal on 9 September, landing at Malta before going onto Egypt.

=== North Africa ===
On arrival in Egypt, Houle was posted to No. 213 Squadron. This was based at Nicosia on Cyprus and operated Hurricanes as part of the island's aerial defences. It was largely unsuccessful, seeing little enemy aircraft during its time there. At the start of 1942, the squadron was returned to Egypt and spent near six months at Edku. Houle was grounded for part of this time, due to an aircraft accident in which he crashed his Hurricane on landing. By July he was back on operations, with the squadron carrying out defensive patrols over the El Alamein sector. On 1 September he destroyed a Junkers Ju 88 medium bomber over El Alamein, his first aerial victory after unsuccessful engagements in the previous months. His Hurricane was damaged in the encounter. Three days later he damaged a Messerschmitt Bf 109 fighter near Borg El Arab.

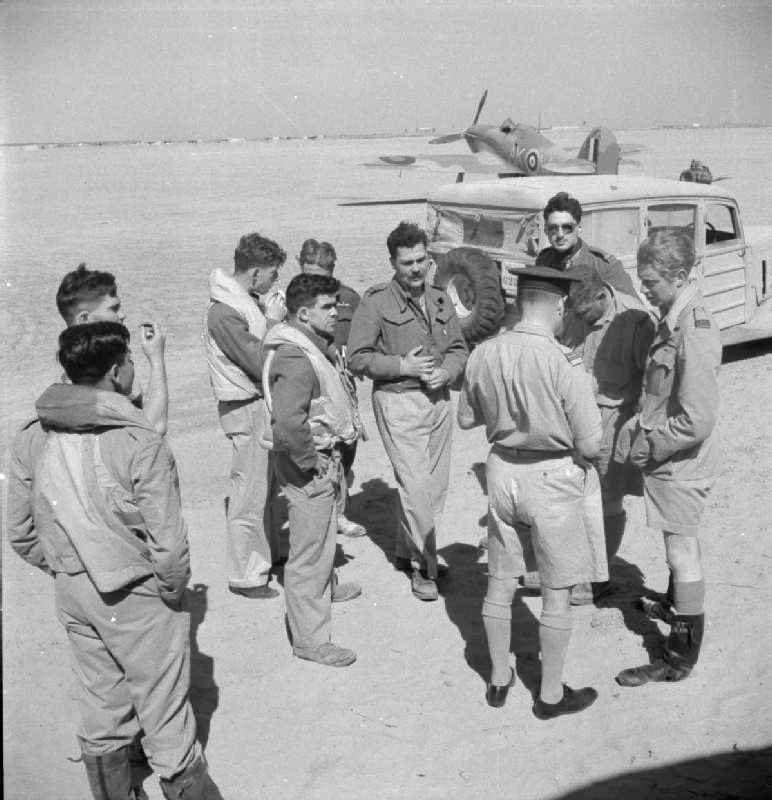
Pilots of No. 213 Squadron being debriefed after returning to their airfield at Edku; Houle stands side on, with hands on hips, at centre

For much of September and October, No. 213 Squadron was engaged in ground support operations with few opportunities for aerial engagements. However, in the early evening of 26 October, Houle, by this time holding the rank of flying officer, and his wingman sighted a group of Junkers Ju 87 dive bombers near El Daba while returning to their base after a patrol over the frontlines at El Alamein. Houle engaged the Ju 87s and shot down two of them, probably destroyed a third and damaged two others. One of the German pilots killed in this action was Kurt Walter, recipient of the Knight's Cross of the Iron Cross. The following month, the squadron participated in 'Operation Chocolate', which involved it flying to an abandoned airstrip behind German lines and, over a period of three days before returning to their base, carrying out strafing attacks on transport and infrastructure. On one of these sorties, Houle shared in the destruction of a Fieseler Fi 156 Storch reconnaissance aircraft; however he did not glean much satisfaction from this success as it was unarmed and he did not consider it "sporting". In early December, and in recognition of his exploits of 26 October, Houle was awarded the Distinguished Flying Cross (DFC). The published citation read:

One evening in October, 1942, Flying Officer Houle was flying with his squadron on patrol over El Alamein when a formation of enemy dive bombers was sighted. The enemy aircraft jettisoned their bombs and flew west in an attempt to avoid combat. With great tenacity and determination Flying Officer Houle pursued them far over the enemy's lines and in the rapidly falling light, engaged and destroyed at least 2 of the hostile bombers. This officer is a skilful pilot, who has always displayed exceptionally cool courage in action. His fine example has been a great inspiration to all personnel in his unit.

— London Gazette, No. 35809, 4 December 1942

Later in the month Houle, promoted to flight lieutenant, was posted to No. 145 Squadron where he was to be a flight commander. This was equipped with Supermarine Spitfire fighters and was operating in support of the Allied advance following the successful Second Battle of El Alamein. Houle shot down a Bf 109 over Tamet on 4 January 1943. The following month he was rested from operations. After returning from leave he briefly served as an instructor at No. 73 OTU at Abu Sueir, but clashed with his commanding officer and was posted away to an engine repair unit as a test pilot of repaired aircraft. He sought a transfer to a RCAF unit for a second tour of operations and in June was posted to No. 417 Squadron.

=== Service with No. 417 Squadron ===
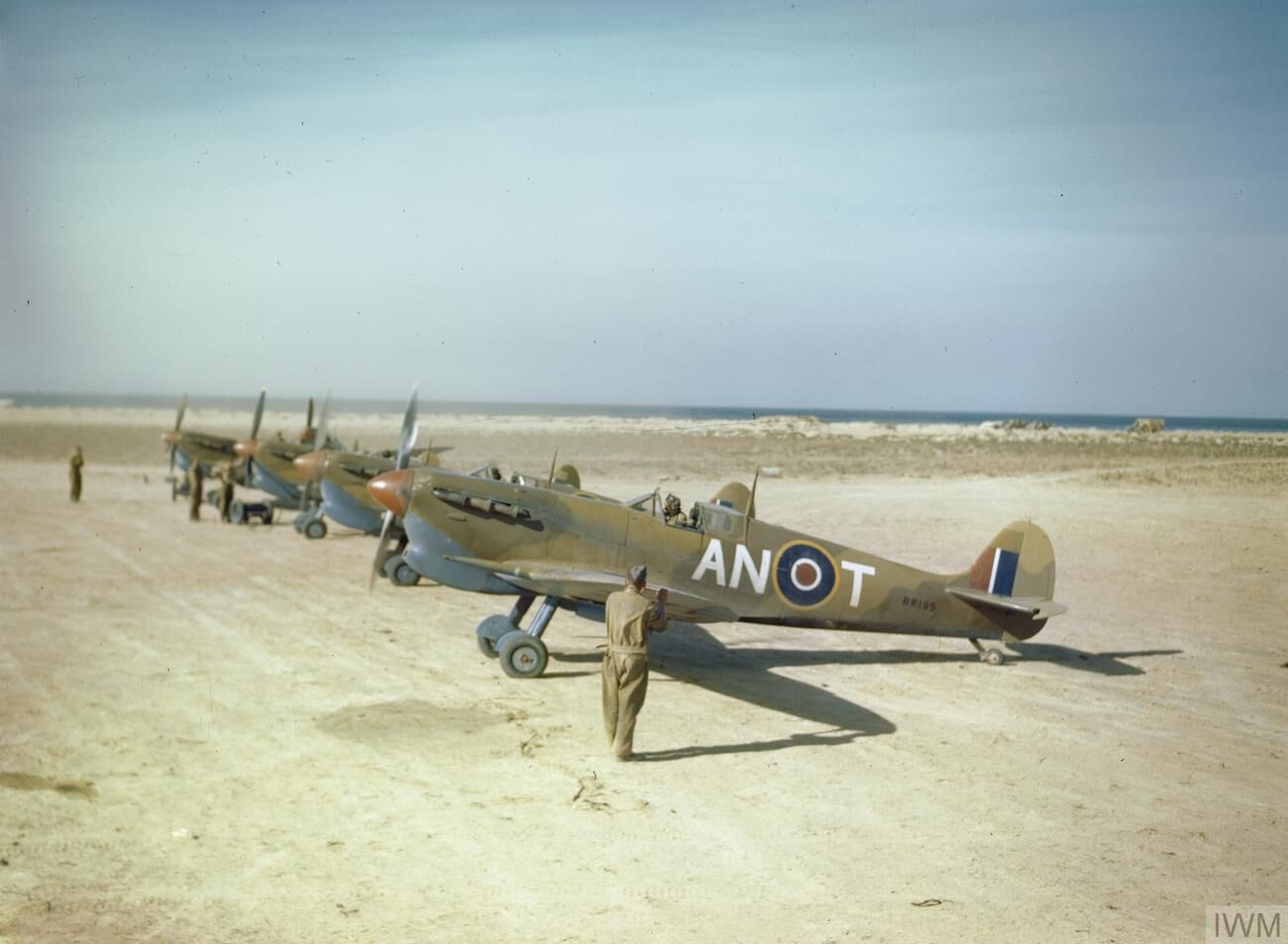
Supermarine Spitfire fighters of No. 417 Squadron at an airfield in Tunisia, 1943

Another Spitfire squadron, No. 417 Squadron was preparing to relocate to Malta from Tunisia to become part of No. 244 Wing for the upcoming invasion of Sicily. It was the only RACF squadron in the region and had a poor performance record. Houle was aware of this and had specifically sought out a posting to the squadron to help remedy the situation, together with its new commander, Squadron Leader Stan Turner. On 10 July the squadron flew patrols over the landing beaches at Sicily and within a few days began operating from the island itself. However, both Houle and Turner were injured not long after they arrived in Sicily when the vehicle they were travelling in ran over a mine. Houle's eardrums were burst and it was not until September that he was able to resume flying operations.

By this time No. 417 Squadron was operating from the Italian mainland and at the end of the month was based at Foggia from where it carried out patrols and interceptions. On 4 October, Houle was leading a patrol when several Focke Wulf 190 fighters were intercepted. He shot one down, seeing it go down into the sea off Vasto. Two other Fw 190s were damaged by Houle in the engagement. Aside from this very few Luftwaffe aircraft were seen.

In December, Houle was promoted to squadron leader and took command of No. 417 Squadron. At the same time, it began to see more German activity and on 3 December, Houle destroyed a pair of Bf 109s over Cannes. On 22 January 1944, while providing aerial cover over the beachhead at Anzio following the landings there, Houle destroyed a Bf 109. He shot down another Bf 109 over Anzio on 27 January and damaged a second. A Bf 109 was destroyed by Houle near the beachhead on 7 February. His final aerial victory was a Fw 190 which he shot down on 14 February but he was wounded in the neck during the engagement. He subsequently relinquished command of the squadron. In April, he was awarded a Bar to his DFC.

Houle was repatriated to Canada where he was involved in a Victory Bond drive. He then performed instructing duties at the RCAF's Hurricane OTU at Bagotville, where he led the Air Firing Squadron. Houle wanted to commence a third tour of operations but following the death of another Canadian flying ace, Lloyd Chadburn, who, like Houle, had completed two operational tours, officials were reluctant to permit this. Frustrated at being obstructed, Houle sought and was granted a discharge from the RCAF.

== Later life ==
Houle did not remain a civilian for long as he rejoined the RCAF in 1946. After gaining a post-graduate degree in aeronautical engineering from the University of Michigan, he was posted to Aircraft Test and Development. He eventually rose to the rank of group captain, finishing his military career in 1965 as commander of the Central Experimental and Proving Establishment and a recipient of the Canadian Forces' Decoration. He took up commercial flying but relinquished his licence in 1989 due to his diminishing eyesight.

Retiring with his wife to Mannotick in Ontario, Houle's later years was blighted by Alzheimer’s Disease and he died on 1 June 2008. Buried at the National Military Cemetery in Ottawa, he was predeceased by his wife. Houle is credited with having shot down at least thirteen aircraft, two of which were shared with other pilots. He damaged seven others and is also credited with the probable destruction of one more.
