= John Victor Sorsoleil =

Canadian First World War flying ace

- Born: 2 June 1898; Peterborough, Ontario, Canada
- Died: 4 September 1956 (aged 58)
- Military career
- Allegiance: King George V of the British Empire
- Branch: Royal Flying Corps; Royal Canadian Air Force
- Rank: Captain
- Nickname: Jack
- Unit: No. 84 Squadron RAF
- Awards: Military Cross

Captain John Victor Sorsoleil MC (2 June 1898 –1956) was a Canadian First World War flying ace, officially credited with 14 victories.

== World War I ==
Effective 13 October 1917, probationary Temporary Second Lieutenant Solsoleil was confirmed in his rank. From November 1917 to July 1918, he flew a Royal Aircraft Factory SE.5a for 84 Squadron. He did not score his first victory until 13 January 1918, when he shot down the only two-seater reconnaissance plane that would ever fall before his guns. Over the next five months, he would accumulate triumphs over 13 German fighters, with his last win on 27 June 1918. He would then be withdrawn to England to instructor duty until war's end.

The final tally of his victories would be three German fighter planes set on fire, six others otherwise destroyed, and five German planes sent down out of control; one of the latter was shared with Carl Frederick Falkenberg.

== Post World War I ==
After Sorsoleil's return to Canada, he was successful in business. During World War II, he joined the Royal Canadian Air Force. He died on 4 September 1956.

== Text of citations ==
=== Military Cross ===
"T./2nd Lt. Jack Victor Sorsoleil, Gen. List, and R.F.C. For conspicuous gallantry and devotion to duty. While on patrol with three other scouts he engaged a hostile formation of ten scouts, driving one of these down. While climbing to rejoin his patrol he was attacked by an enemy scout, upon which he opened fire at close range, bringing it down spinning, with the result that it crashed to earth. He has also driven down one enemy machine in flames, and sent another crashing to earth, where it was destroyed. His gallantry and skill have been most conspicuous."
