= Joseph Larichelière =

Royal Air Force officer

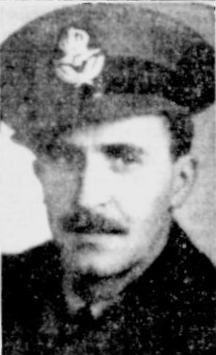
- Born: 3 December 1912; Montreal, Quebec, Canada
- Died: 16 August 1940 (aged 27); English Channel
- Military career
- Allegiance: Canada; United Kingdom
- Branch: Royal Air Force
- Rank: Pilot Officer
- Unit: No. 213 Squadron
- Conflicts: Second World War: Battle of Britain

Joseph Émile Paul Larichelière (3 December 1912 – 16 August 1940) was a Canadian officer who served in the Royal Air Force (RAF) during the Second World War. He is credited with six aerial victories.

Born in Montreal, Larichelière joined the RAF in early 1939. After qualifying as a pilot, he received instruction on the Hawker Hurricane fighter, and in mid-May 1940 was posted to No. 504 Squadron. When the squadron was sent to the continent during the Battle of France, he was transferred to No. 213 Squadron. Larichelière flew extensively in the early stages of the Battle of Britain. He achieved all six of his aerial victories in a three-day period during August before going missing, believed killed in action.

== Early life ==
Joseph Émile Paul Larichelière was born on 3 December 1912 in Montreal, Quebec, in Canada. His parents were French-Canadians. After completing his schooling he went to the University of Montreal, graduating in 1933. He continued to study part-time while working until, in early 1939, he applied to join the Royal Air Force (RAF) on a short-service commission. Travelling to England, Larichelière began initial flight training at No. 22 Elementary Flying Training School at Cambridge. Completing this stage of his flight instruction, he was granted a short-service commission as an acting pilot officer on probation, with effect from 23 October 1939.

== Second World War ==
Larichelière gained his commission a month after the Second World War began. He continued his flight training, and received his wings in early 1940. By May, he was at No. 6 Operational Training Unit at Sutton Bridge, gaining familiarity with the Hawker Hurricane fighter. He was posted to No. 504 Squadron on 18 May; the same day, his status as a pilot officer was confirmed although he remained on probation. When he joined the squadron, it was operating Hurricanes from Debden but was in the process of moving to France, as a reinforcement for the Air Component of the British Expeditionary Force (BEF) engaged in the fighting there.

Due to Larichelière's inexperience, rather than proceeding to France he was posted to No. 213 Squadron. Larichelière's new unit, based at Wittering and operating Hurricanes, had only just returned from France and a detachment based at Manston was still flying there regularly and helped cover the evacuation of the BEF from Dunkirk. Larichelière was not involved with this and instead was working at becoming operational.

=== Battle of Britain ===
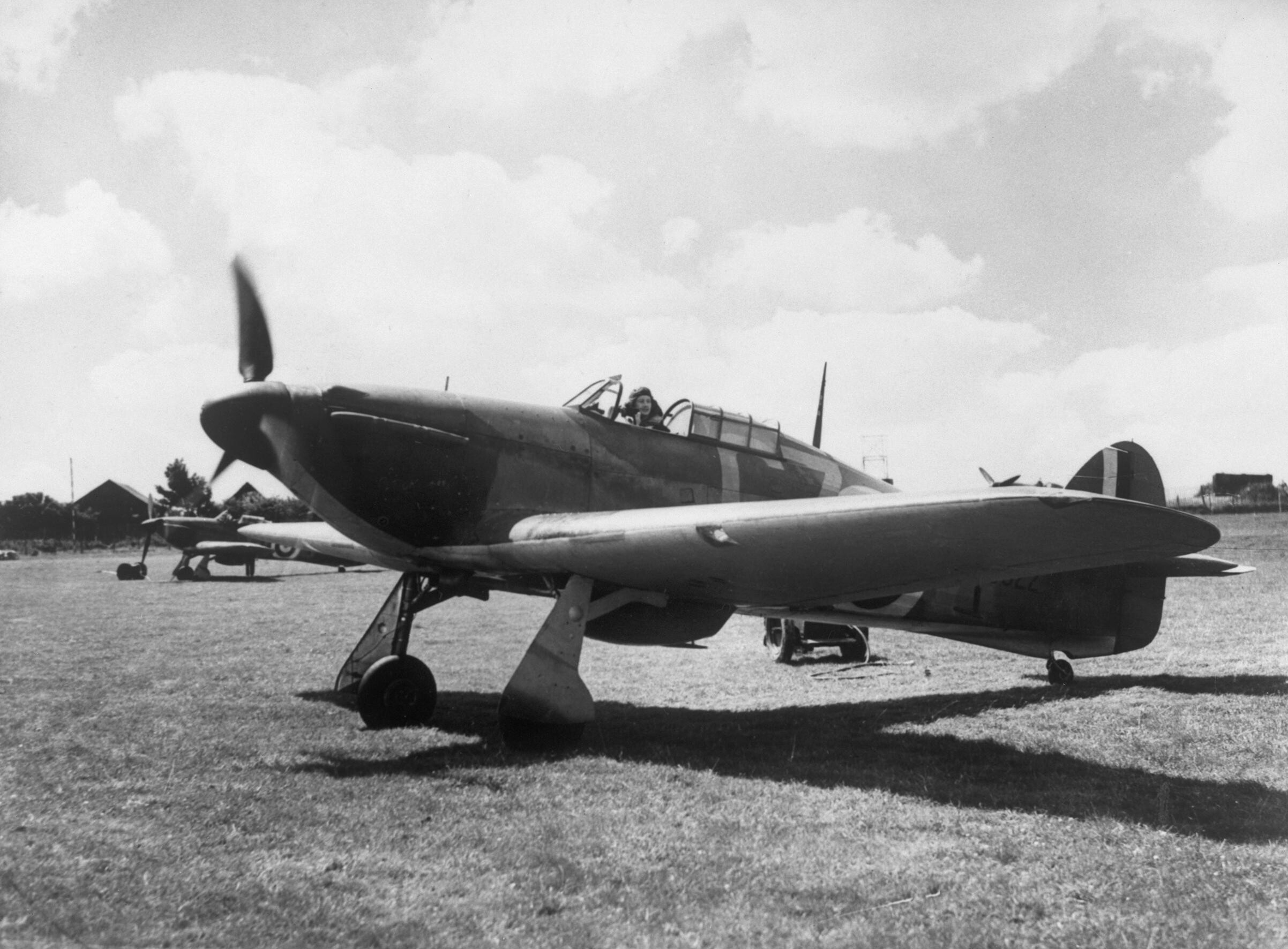
A Hawker Hurricane during the Battle of Britain

In June, the squadron was transferred to Exeter in the southwest of England to patrol the coast as part of No. 10 Group. Larichelière regularly flew on these patrols throughout July and into the following month, during which its operations intensified as the Battle of Britain escalated. By August, the squadron was routinely flying up to eight patrols daily.

On 13 August, subsequently known as Adlertag (Eagle Day), the Luftwaffe commenced a mass attack against RAF airfields. Several bombers attacked Portland after being unable to find their original objectives; while patrolling in the area, Larichelière pursued a Junkers Ju 88 medium bomber. After 15 minutes of chasing the bomber, he damaged it sufficiently with his Hurricane's machine-guns that it crashed into the sea. Shortly afterwards, he destroyed a Messerschmitt Bf 109 fighter that flew over the site of Larichelière's victim. On another patrol in the same area on the same day, he accidentally flew into a formation of Messerschmitt Bf 110 heavy fighters as he emerged from clouds. He fired at one Bf 110 as he hastily departed and saw it break up in mid-air.

Two days later, No. 213 Squadron and two other squadrons were scrambled to intercept a large group of Junkers Ju 87 dive bombers escorted by Bf 109s and Bf 110s. Originally headed for Warmwell, the German formation had been diverted to Portland after encountering several RAF fighters on the way. Larichelière engaged and destroyed a Bf 110 just south of Portland and then pursued and shot down a Ju 87, seeing it go down into the English Channel. He destroyed another Bf 110 when he returned to the main dogfight; this was also observed crashing into the sea, Larichelière having caused one of its engines to explode.

The next day, 16 August, Larichelière and his fellow pilots were scrambled to intercept another Luftwaffe bomber formation heading for Portland. Becoming involved in a dogfight over the Isle of Wight, he failed to return to Exeter and was presumed to have been shot down over the English Channel and killed. He has no known grave and is commemorated on the Runneymeade Memorial at Englefield Green. Larichelière is credited with six aircraft destroyed.
