= Charles Hickey (RAF officer) =

WW1 Canadian ace

Charles Robert Reeves Hickey
- Born: 10 September 1897; Nanaimo, British Columbia
- Died: 3 October 1918 (aged 21); Belgium
- Military career
- Allegiance: George V
- Branch: Royal Naval Air Service; Royal Air Force
- Rank: Captain
- Unit: No. 4 Squadron RNAS/No. 204 Squadron RAF
- Awards: Distinguished Flying Cross & Bar

Charles Robert Reeves Hickey DFC & Bar (10 September 1897 – 3 October 1918) was a Canadian World War I flying ace, officially credited with 21 victories. He is buried in the military cemetery in Koksijde, Belgium.

== Text of citations ==
=== Distinguished Flying Cross ===
Lieutenant Charles Robert Reeves Hickey distinguished himself in numerous aerial engagements over a twelve-month period, achieving notable success. On one occasion, he flew to the aid of a friendly aircraft that was under attack by two enemy aircraft and succeeded in shooting down one of the attackers.

=== Distinguished Flying Cross - Bar ===
Lieutenant (Temporary Captain) Charles Robert Reeves Hickey, D.F.C., Sea Patrol (Canadian Mounted Rifles), was recognized as a determined and highly effective fighter pilot who destroyed seven enemy aircraft during the First World War. As a flight commander, his skill, leadership, and initiative contributed significantly to his unit's success. In one notable day of combat, he destroyed two enemy aircraft and forced two additional aircraft down out of control. During the same engagement, the remainder of his flight accounted for several more enemy aircraft without suffering any casualties.
