= Henry Gordon Clappison =

Canadian World War I flying ace

- Born: October 1, 1898; Hamilton, Ontario, Canada
- Died: May 15, 1977 (aged 78); Toronto, Ontario, Canada
- Military career
- Allegiance: Canada; United Kingdom
- Branch: Canadian Expeditionary Force; Royal Air Force
- Service years: 1917 - 1919
- Rank: Captain
- Nickname: Harry
- Units: 91st Highlander Regiment; No. 204 Squadron RAF
- Awards: Belgian Croix de Guerre

Captain Henry Gordon Clappison (October 1, 1898 – May 15, 1977) was a World War I flying ace credited with six aerial victories.

Clappison's run of victories came late in World War I. He was assigned to 204 Squadron in August 1918 to pilot a Sopwith Camel. He set afire a Fokker D.VII on 20 September 1918 and ran up five more wins over D.VIIs by November 1. His final tally was two destroyed, four driven down out of control.
