= Stanley Wallace Rosevear =

Canadian World War I flying ace

Stanley Rosevear
- Born: 9 March 1896; Walkerton, Ontario
- Died: 25 April 1918 (aged 22); Arras, France
- Military career
- Allegiance: United Kingdom
- Branch: Royal Naval Air Service, Royal Air Force
- Service years: 1917-1918
- Rank: Captain
- Unit: No. 1 Squadron RNAS/No. 201 Squadron RAF
- Awards: Distinguished Service Cross (DSC) & Bar

Stanley Wallace Rosevear DSC & Bar (9 March 1896 – 25 April 1918) was a Canadian First World War flying ace, officially credited with 25 victories.

== Text of citations ==
=== Distinguished Service Cross ===
"Flt. Sub-Lieut. Stanley Wallace Rosevear, R.N.A.S. For conspicuous gallantry and devotion to duty. He has destroyed several hostile machines, and has also attacked and scattered parties of enemy infantry from low altitudes, on one occasion from a height of only 100 feet."

=== Distinguished Service Cross - Bar ===
"Flt. Lieut. Stanley Wallace Rosevear, D.S.C., R.N.A.S. For the skill and gallantry displayed by him on the 15th March, 1918, when he attacked a formation of eight enemy aircraft, destroying two of the enemy machines. This officer has destroyed numerous enemy machines and is a very skilful and dashing fighting pilot."
