= James Walker (RAF officer) =

Canadian flying ace of WWII

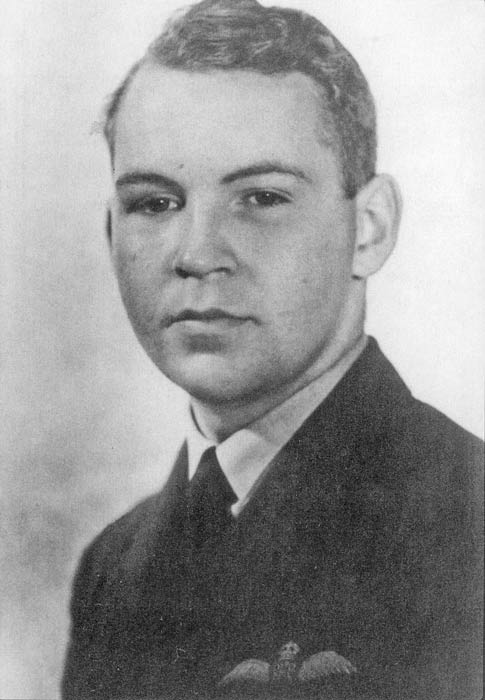
- Born: 1 January 1918; Gleichen, Alberta, Canada
- Died: 8 February 1944 (aged 26); Arakan, Burma
- Military career
- Allegiance: Canada
- Branch: Royal Air Force
- Rank: Flight Lieutenant
- Commands: No. 250 Squadron
- Conflicts: Second World War: Battle of France; Battle of Britain; Circus offensive; First Battle of El Alamein
- Awards: Distinguished Flying Cross

James Walker, DFC (1 January 1918 – 8 February 1944) was a Canadian flying ace of the Royal Air Force (RAF) during the Second World War. He was credited with the destruction of at least seven aircraft.

From Alberta, Walker joined the RAF on a short service commission in 1938. Once his training was completed, he was posted to No. 111 Squadron. He flew Hawker Hurricane fighters during the Battle of France, claiming his first aerial victories, then in the subsequent Battle of Britain. Awarded the Distinguished Flying Cross in September 1940, he participated in the RAF's Circus offensive the following year with No. 603 Squadron. For much of 1942, he served in North Africa, latterly as commander of No. 250 Squadron, which he led during its involvement in the First Battle of El Alamein. His later war service was spent in British India as a pilot of transport aircraft with No. 31 Squadron. He was shot down and killed on 8 February 1944 while on a supply mission to the Arakan.

== Early life ==
James Arthur Walker was born on 1 January 1918 in Gleichen, Alberta, in Canada. Once his schooling was completed, he worked in the insurance industry. In March 1938, having travelled to the United Kingdom, he applied to the Royal Air Force for a short service commission. He was granted his commission in May, with the rank of acting pilot officer. After training at No. 2 Flying Training School at Brize Norton, he was posted to No. 111 Squadron in December 1938. His new unit was stationed at Northolt and was equipped with the Hawker Hurricane fighter, the first RAF squadron to receive the type. He was confirmed in his pilot officer rank in March 1939.

== Second World War ==
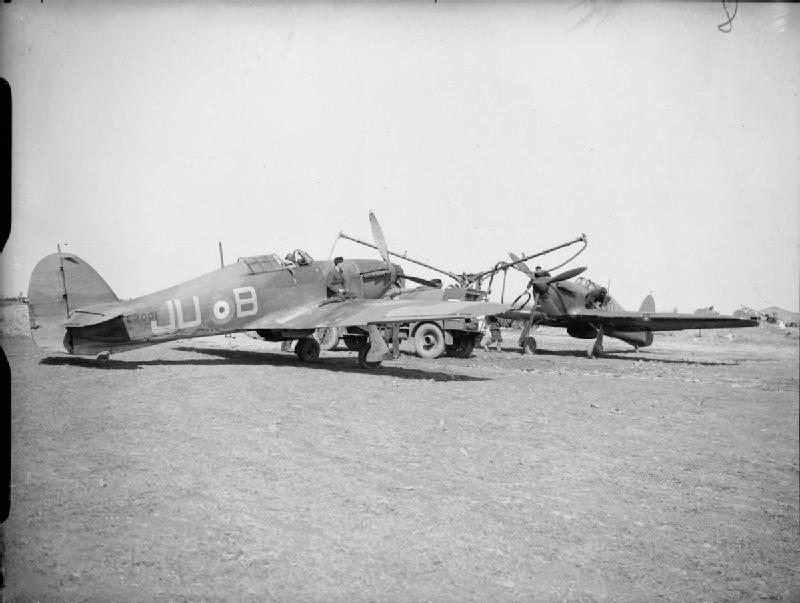
Hawker Hurricane fighters of No. 111 Squadron at Wick

Shortly after the outbreak of the Second World War, No. 111 Squadron moved north, initially to Acklington and then to Drem in Scotland, from where it patrolled along the coastline. The next month No. 111 Squadron shifted again, this time to Wick, where it provided the Royal Navy base at Scapa Flow with aerial cover. It was occasionally scrambled to counter Luftwaffe bomber attacks.

=== Battle of France ===
By mid-May, No. 111 Squadron was back in the south of England, from where it regularly flew to France following the invasion of that country. On 18 May Walker shared in the destruction of a Henschel Hs 126 reconnaissance aircraft near Cambrai. The same day, he shot down a Heinkel He 111 medium bomber over Douai. From late May and into early June, No. 111 Squadron flew in support of Operation Dynamo, the evacuation of the British Expeditionary Force from Dunkirk. During this time, on 31 May, Walker destroyed a Messerschmitt Bf 109 fighter to the northwest of Dunkirk.

Once the evacuation was completed, the squadron provided escorts for the Fleet Air Arm's bombing operations over the French coast and on 7 June, Walker destroyed a Bf 109 near Mauberge. Four days later, he shot down a Dornier Do 17 medium bomber near Le Havre.

=== Battle of Britain ===
A period of rest at Croydon followed for No. 111 Squadron, during which it received replacement pilots and equipment. It soon commenced patrolling over the English Channel and then became drawn into the aerial fighting over the southeast of England during the Battle of Britain. Walker destroyed a Do 17 over Herne Bay on 13 August and three days later shot down a Bf 109 in the vicinity of Ashford. On 6 September it was formally announced that Walker, having been promoted to flying officer, was to be awarded the Distinguished Flying Cross (DFC) for his exploits of the previous weeks. The citation for the DFC was published in The London Gazette and read:

This officer has shown himself to be a keen and steady pilot and has displayed magnificent courage in the face of superior numbers of enemy aircraft. Since the middle of May he has shot down at least six enemy aircraft.

— London Gazette, No. 34940, 6 September 1940

No. 111 Squadron moved north to Drem for a period of rest on 8 September. Much of the following weeks was spent training pilots who were then sent south as replacements for the squadrons still engaged in the Battle of Britain. However, it also carried out patrol duties and were occasionally called upon for interception duties. On 1 January 1941, Walker shared in the probably destruction of a Junkers Ju 88 medium bomber near Aberdeen. In an engagement on 17 March, he damaged a Ju 88 to the north of Aberdeen. By this time he was a flight commander in the squadron. He was rested from operations in April when he was posted as an instructor at No. 57 Operational Training Unit but was only there for a month when he was posted to No. 603 Squadron. This was stationed at Hornchurch as part of the fighter wing based there and with its Supermarine Spitfire fighters, was engaged in the RAF's Circus offensive.

In August he was transferred to No. 610 Squadron. Like his former unit, this was equipped with Spitfires but was based in Yorkshire at Leconfield from where it was engaged in shipping patrols. It subsequently received upgraded Spitfire Mk Vbs. Walker was promoted to flight lieutenant in September.

=== North Africa ===
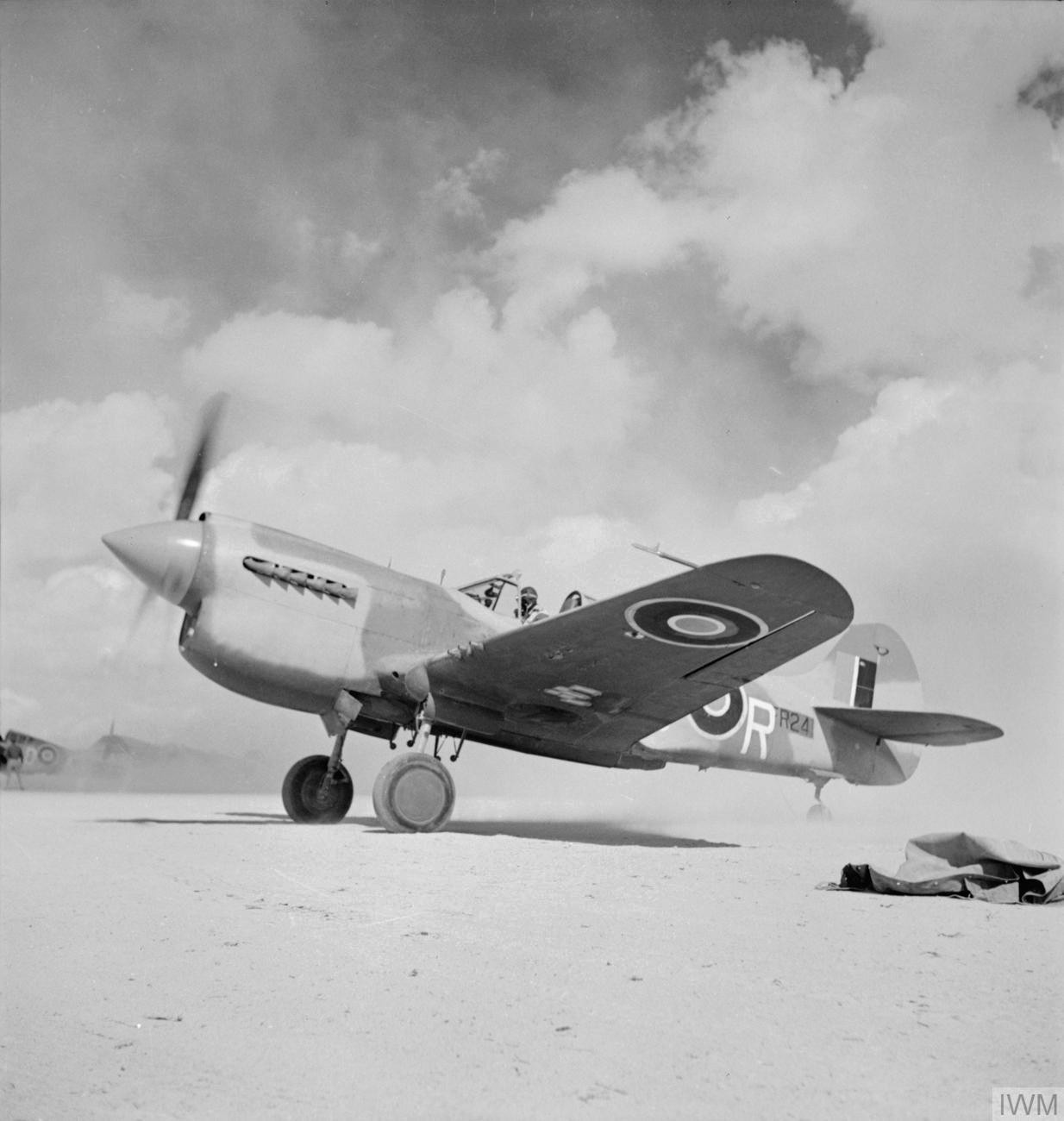
Curtiss Kittyhawk fighter of No. 250 Squadron at Landing Ground 91, July 1942

In April 1942, Walker was posted to No. 94 Squadron, then serving in the Western Desert as part of the aerial defences for the Nile Delta area. At the start of June, Walker was posted to No. 112 Squadron. This was based at Gambut and was operating Curtiss Kittyhawk fighters, both in an interceptor role and as fighter-bombers. During his service with the squadron Walker was shot down on at least one occasion, but was able to return to his unit the next day. In July Walker was given command of No. 250 Squadron. The unit was based at Landing Ground 91 and with its Kittyhawks, operated mostly in a ground support role. It was heavily engaged in the First Battle of El Alamein that month. Walker ceded command of the squadron in September.

=== Later war service ===
In 1943 Walker was posted to No. 31 Squadron. This was a unit of Transport Command and based in India, operating Douglas Dakota transports. On a supply run to the Arakan on 8 February 1944, the Dakota he was piloting was shot down by a Japanese fighter. Walker was killed although two of his crew survived and were later rescued by British Army personnel. At least one other pilot of the squadron believed that Walker deliberately led the Japanese fighters away from the other Dakotas on the supply mission.

With no known grave, Walker is commemorated on the Singapore Memorial at Kranji War Cemetery in Singapore. He is credited with having destroyed seven aircraft, one of which was shared with other pilots, and one damaged. He is also credited with having probably destroyed one aircraft.
