= Ernest James Salter =

Canadian flying ace

- Born: 9 November 1897; Greenbank, Ontario, Canada
- Died: 23 March 1959 (aged 61); Oakville, Ontario, Canada
- Military career
- Allegiance: Canada
- Branch: Royal Flying Corps
- Rank: Captain
- Unit: No. 54 Squadron RAF
- Awards: French Legion d'honneur and Croix de Guerre
- Other work: Served as bombing instructor in World War II

Captain Ernest James Salter was a Canadian World War I flying ace credited with nine aerial victories. He returned to service during World War II.

== Early life ==
Ernest James Salter was born in Greenbank, Ontario, Canada on 9 November 1897. He was the son of Mary Helen Coultis and Theophilus L. Salter. Ernest was living in Mimico when he enlisted in the Royal Flying Corps on 3 June 1917.

== World War I ==
Salter trained as a pilot and was awarded Royal Aero Club Pilot's Certificate No. 7211 on 27 August 1917. He was commissioned as a probationary temporary second lieutenant on 13 October 1917. He then sailed from Canada on 29 October 1917. He was appointed a Flying Officer on 26 February 1918, and arrived in France on 15 March 1918. He joined 54 Squadron from 19 March to 12 April 1918, when he was hospitalized. He rejoined the squadron on 19 May 1918. He was promoted to captain on 9 August 1918; such promotions were given to those appointed as Flight Commander. On 2 September 1918, Salter was wounded in action. He was invalided back to England on 7 September 1918. Although he won no British awards, Salter was honoured by the French with the Legion d'Honneur on 30 November 1918 as well as the Croix de guerre avec Palme.

== List of aerial victories ==
No.	Date/time	Aircraft	Foe	Result	Location	Notes
1	9 June 1918 @ 0715 hours	Sopwith Camel serial number B7171	German reconnaissance plane	Driven down out of control	East of Zandvoorde	
2	4 July 1918 @ 1430 hours	Sopwith Camel s/n D1948	Hannover reconnaissance plane	Driven down out of control	Herleville	
3	5 July 1918 @ 1050 hours	Sopwith Camel s/n D1948	Albatros D.V	Driven down out of control	Northeast of Lamotte	
4	21 July 1918 @ 1555 hours	Sopwith Camel s/n D1946	Halberstadt reconnaissance plane	Destroyed	East of Dravegny	
5	21 July 1918 @ 1600 hours	Sopwith Camel s/n D1946	Halberstadt reconnaissance plane	Destroyed	Half a mile east of Chery	
6	21 July 1918 @ 1915 hours	Sopwith Camel D9497	Fokker D.VII	Set afire; destroyed	Fère en Tardenois	
7	22 August 1918 @ 1745 hours	Sopwith Camel s/n D1946	Albatros reconnaissance plane	Destroyed	200 yards west of Grévillers	Victory shared with three other pilots
8	25 August 1918 @ 1045 hours	Sopwith Camel s/n D1946	Fokker D.VII	Driven down out of control	Combles	
9	30 August 1918 @ 0645 hours	Sopwith Camel s/n E5168	Fokker D.VII	Driven down out of control	Southeast of Riencourt	

== Post World War I ==
Salter was repatriated on 29 March 1919. He reputedly flew as a bush pilot for three years afterwards. He returned to duty in World War II, serving as a bombing instructor.

Ernest James Salter died in Oakville, Ontario, Canada on 26 March 1959.
