= David MacKay McGoun =

- Born: 4 December 1892; Montreal, Quebec, Canada
- Died: Unknown
- Military career
- Allegiance: Canada; United Kingdom
- Branch: Canadian Expeditionary Force; Royal Flying Corps
- Rank: Captain
- Units: NO. 20 Squadron RFC; No. 22 Squadron RAF

Captain David MacKay McGoun MC (4 December 1892 – ??) was a Canadian World War I flying ace credited with nine aerial victories.

== Military service ==
McGoun originally enlisted in the 24th Battalion (Victoria Rifles), CEF of the Canadian Expeditionary Force but transferred to the Royal Flying Corps in October 1916. He was assigned to No. 20 Squadron RFC as a pilot of a Bristol F.2 Fighter. He scored his first victory on 27 October 1917; by 17 February 1918, he had run his total to five, becoming an ace. On 8 March 1918, while still a Temporary Second Lieutenant, he was appointed Flight Commander and Temporary Captain in 22 Squadron. He scored four more triumphs with this squadron, with the last one occurring on 12 April 1918. His final tally was four enemy planes destroyed, five driven down out of control.

On 15 June 1918, McGoun left Liverpool and landed at Ellis Island, New York on the 25th. His passage was paid by the British government. His height is given as five feet eight inches. His sister was named as his next of kin, and his home of record was given as 1 Cote Saint Antoine Road, Westmount, Quebec. And although others on the passenger manifest are noted as being in transit to Canada, he is not.

McGoun was awarded a Military Cross on 26 July 1918.

== Postwar career ==
On 1 May 1919, he was transferred to the Royal Air Force's unemployed list.

== Honors and awards ==
Military Cross (MC)

T./Capt. David Mackay McGoun, R.A.F. For conspicuous gallantry and devotion to duty as a leader of offensive patrols. It is entirely due to his determination and skill that his patrol has destroyed many enemy machines. His consistent keenness, his gallantry, and untiring energy have at all times set a magnificent example to all the pilots and observers in his squadron. He has personally destroyed many hostile machines, never hesitating to attack, and on all occasions displaying a fighting spirit which has earned the admiration of all in contact with him.
