= R. A. Del'Haye =

Roger Amedee Del'Haye
- Born: 9 January 1889; Châlons-sur-Marne, France
- Died: 18 November 1944 (aged 55); Canada
- Military career
- Branch: Royal Flying Corps; Royal Air Force; Royal Canadian Air Force
- Rank: Air Commodore
- Conflicts: World War I
- Awards: Distinguished Flying Cross

Roger Amedee Del'Haye DFC was a Canadian flying ace pilot in the First World War who shot down 9 German Aircraft.

Del'Haye was born in France at Châlons-sur-Marne on 9 January 1889, educated at the University of Paris and emigrated to Regina, Canada, becoming a British subject in 1914.

== Combat record ==
Del'Haye joined the RFC in October 1915 and served with No.13 Squadron from April 1916 to May 1917 on Royal Aircraft Factory B.E.2's and RE8's. After converting to single-seater aircraft, from May 1918 he served with No. 19 Squadron RAF, shooting down one Fokker Dr.I and eight Pfalz Scout airplanes. He ended the War as a Flight Commander, having also received the British DFC and the Belgian Croix de Guerre.

In the 1930s, alongside his civilian job, Del'Haye commanded RCAF Reserve Squadron No. 120. By 1944, he had become an Air Commodore but was killed on 18 November of that year flying a Harvard Trainer which crashed on take-off.

== Honours and awards ==
- 3 December 1918 - Distinguished Flying Cross - Capt. Roger Amedee Delhaye in recognition of gallantry in flying operations against the enemy in France. "A most efficient fighting leader to whose example the high standard of efficiency attained by his squadron is large due. He has led numerous offensive patrols, accounting for eight enemy machines. On all occasions he has shown hugh courage, ability and fine leadership."
