= List of World War I aces credited with 11–14 victories =

The term ace (now commonly flying ace) was first used by French newspapers during World War I, describing Adolphe Pégoud as l'as ('the ace'), after he downed five German aircraft. When aircraft began to shoot or force down other aircraft, systems to count "air victories" were subsequently developed. The American qualification of five victories eventually became the standard, even though other air services had previously used differing figures.

While "ace" status was most often won by fighter pilots, bomber and reconnaissance crews, and observers in two-seater aircraft such as the Bristol F.2b ("Bristol Fighter"), also destroyed enemy aircraft. If a two-seater aircraft destroyed an aircraft, both crew members were credited with a victory. Because pilots usually teamed with differing observer/gunners in two-seater aircraft, an observer might be an ace when his pilot was not, and vice versa. The few aces among combat aviators have historically accounted for the majority of air-to-air victories in military history.

Loss of records by mischance and the passage of time complicates reconstructing the actual count for given aces. The scores presented in the list cannot be definitive, but are based on itemized lists that are the best available sources of information. Aces are listed after verifying the date and location of combat, and the foe vanquished, for every victory accredited by an aviator's home air service using their own aerial victory standards. Those victories for which the evidence is unavailable or fragmentary have been excluded from the victory count.

== Aces ==
This along with the symbolic dagger †, indicates that the pilot was known to be either killed in action, missing in action, died of wounds, or killed in a flying accident during World War I.

Name	Country	Air service(s)	Victories	Notes
Marius Ambrogi	France	Aéronautique Militaire	14	Légion d'honneur, Médaille militaire, Croix de Guerre with ten Palmes and a star
Colin Brow	United Kingdom	Royal Naval Air Service, Royal Air Force	14	Distinguished Flying Cross with Bar, French Croix de Guerre
Carleton Main Clement	Canada	Royal Flying Corps	14	Military Cross, French Croix de Guerre
Arthur Coningham	Australia	Royal Flying Corps, Royal Air Force	14	Order of the Bath, Order of the British Empire, Distinguished Service Order, Military Cross, Distinguished Flying Cross, Air Force Cross Commander Western Desert Air Force, and Air Marshal commanding RAF Second Tactical Air Force during World War II.
Euan Dickson	United Kingdom	Royal Naval Air Service, Royal Air Force	14	Distinguished Service Cross with Bar, Distinguished Flying Cross, French Croix de Guerre
Charles Findlay	United Kingdom	Royal Flying Corps, Royal Air Force	14	Distinguished Flying Cross
Maxwell Findlay	United Kingdom	Royal Naval Air Service, Royal Air Force	14	Distinguished Service Cross, Distinguished Flying Cross
James Fitz-Morris	United Kingdom	Royal Flying Corps, Royal Air Force	14	Military Cross with Bar.
Frank George Gibbons	United Kingdom	Royal Flying Corps, Royal Air Force	14	Distinguished Flying Cross
Albert Earl Godfrey	Canada	Royal Flying Corps, Royal Air Force	14	Military Cross
Frank Gorringe	United Kingdom	Royal Flying Corps, Royal Air Force	14	Military Cross, Distinguished Flying Cross
Reinhold Jörke	Germany	Luftstreitkräfte	14	Iron Cross
Arthur Keen	United Kingdom	Royal Flying Corps, Royal Air Force	14	Military Cross
Frederick Libby	United States	Royal Flying Corps, US Army Air Service	14	First American ace. British Military Cross
Ronald T. Mark	United Kingdom	Royal Flying Corps, Royal Air Force	14	Military Cross with Bar.
Maurice Mealing	United Kingdom	Royal Flying Corps, Royal Air Force	14	Military Cross
Walter Naylor	United Kingdom	Royal Naval Air Service, Royal Air Force	14	Distinguished Service Medal
James Dennis Payne	United Kingdom	Royal Flying Corps, Royal Air Force	14	Military Cross
Franz Piechulek	Germany	Luftstreitkräfte	14	Iron Cross
Georg Schlenker	Germany	Luftstreitkräfte	14	Royal House Order of Hohenzollern, Iron Cross
William Sidebottom	United Kingdom	Royal Naval Air Service, Royal Air Force	14	Distinguished Flying Cross
John Victor Sorsoleil	Canada	Royal Flying Corps, Royal Air Force, Royal Canadian Air Force	14	Military Cross
George Thomson	Canada	Royal Flying Corps, Royal Air Force	14	Distinguished Flying Cross
Kenneth R. Unger	United States	Royal Flying Corps, Royal Air Force	14	British Distinguished Flying Cross
Arthur Vigers	United Kingdom	Royal Flying Corps	14	Military Cross, Distinguished Flying Cross
Hazel Wallace	Canada	Royal Naval Air Service, Royal Air Force	14	Distinguished Flying Cross
Herbert Watson	New Zealand	Australian Flying Corps	14	Highest scoring New Zealander in AFC. Distinguished Flying Cross
Noel Webb	United Kingdom	Royal Flying Corps	14	Military Cross with Bar.
Rudolf Wendelmuth	Germany	Luftstreitkräfte	14	Iron Cross
Thomas F. Williams	Canada	Royal Flying Corps, Royal Air Force, Royal Canadian Air Force	14	Military Cross, Italian Medal for Military Valor
Frederick C. Armstrong	Canada	Royal Naval Air Service	13	Distinguished Service Cross, French Croix de Guerre
Charles C. Banks	United Kingdom	Royal Flying Corps, Royal Air Force	13	Military Cross, Distinguished Flying Cross
Reginald Brading	United Kingdom	Royal Naval Air Service, Royal Air Force	13	Distinguished Flying Cross
Hans-Joachim Buddecke	Germany	Luftstreitkräfte	13	Pour le Mérite, Iron Cross
Siegfried Büttner	Germany	Luftstreitkräfte	13	
Jean Casale	France	Aéronautique Militaire	13	Légion d'honneur, Médaille militaire, Croix de Guerre with nine Palmes
Friedrich Christiansen	Germany	Luftstreitkräfte	13	Pour le Mérite (awarded for 21 victories), Royal House Order of Hohenzollern, Iron Cross
Geoffrey Hornblower Cock	United Kingdom	Royal Flying Corps	13	Military Cross, Royal Air Force
Dieter Collin	Germany	Luftstreitkräfte	13	Iron Cross
Douglas Graham Cooke	United Kingdom	Royal Flying Corps, Royal Air Force	13	Military Cross
Sidney Cottle	United Kingdom	Royal Flying Corps, Royal Air Force	13	Member of The Order of the British Empire, Distinguished Flying Cross, Italian Medal for Military Valor
Wilfred A. Curtis	Canada	Royal Flying Corps, Royal Air Force, Royal Canadian Air Force	13	Distinguished Service Cross with Bar. As Air Marshal, served as Canadian Chief of Air Staff.
Omer Demeuldre	France	Aéronautique Militaire	13	Légion d'honneur, Médaille militaire, Croix de Guerre with seven Palmes and two Étoiles
Albert Enstone	United Kingdom	Royal Naval Air Service, Royal Air Force	13	Distinguished Service Cross, Distinguished Flying Cross
Hector Garaud	France	Aéronautique Militaire	13	Légion d'honneur, Médaille militaire, Croix de Guerre with eight Palmes and two Étoiles
Heinrich Geigl	Germany	Luftstreitkräfte	13	Royal House Order of Hohenzollern, Iron Cross
Gavin L. Graham	South Africa	Royal Flying Corps, Royal Air Force	13	Distinguished Flying Cross, French Légion d'honneur, French Croix de Guerre
Harold A. Hamersley	Australia	Australian Flying Corps	13	Military Cross
Robert Heibert	Germany	Luftstreitkräfte	13	Military Merit Cross, Iron Cross
Oscar Heron	United Kingdom	Royal Flying Corps	13	Distinguished Flying Cross, Belgian Croix de guerre
Spencer B. Horn	United Kingdom	Royal Flying Corps	13	Military Cross
George R. Howsam	Canada	Royal Flying Corps, Royal Air Force, Royal Canadian Air Force	13	Military Cross. Retired 1945 as Air Vice-Marshal of RCAF.
Ernest Charles Hoy	Canada	Royal Flying Corps, Royal Air Force	13	Distinguished Flying Cross
Harold B. Hudson	Canada	Royal Flying Corps, Royal Air Force	13	Military Cross
Johannes Janzen	Germany	Luftstreitkräfte	13	Iron Cross
Solomon Clifford Joseph	United Kingdom	Royal Naval Air Service, Royal Air Force	13	Distinguished Flying Cross with Bar.
Ronald M. Keirstead	Canada	Royal Naval Air Service, Royal Air Force	13	Distinguished Service Cross
John Letts	United Kingdom	Royal Flying Corps	13	Military Cross
Sydney Tyndall Liversedge	United Kingdom	Royal Flying Corps, Royal Air Force	13	
William E. G. Mann	United Kingdom	Royal Naval Air Service, Royal Air Force	13	Distinguished Flying Cross
John G. Manuel	Canada	Royal Naval Air Service, Royal Air Force	13	Distinguished Service Cross, Distinguished Flying Cross
Wilfrid Reid May	Canada	Royal Flying Corps, Royal Air Force	13	Distinguished Flying Cross
Christian Mesch	Germany	Luftstreitkräfte	13<	
Marcel Nogues	France	Aéronautique Militaire	13	Légion d'honneur, Croix de Guerre with 12 Palmes
Thomas L. Purdom	United Kingdom	Royal Flying Corps, Royal Air Force	13	Military Cross
David Putnam	United States	Aéronautique Militaire, US Army Air Service	13	Distinguished Service Cross, French Légion d'honneur, Médaille militaire, Croix de Guerre
Francis James Ralph	United Kingdom	Royal Flying Corps, Royal Air Force	13	Distinguished Flying Cross
Harry Gosford Reeves	United Kingdom	Royal Flying Corps	13	
George R. Riley	United Kingdom	Royal Flying Corps, Royal Air Force	13	Military Cross, Distinguished Flying Cross
Otto Rosenfeld	Germany	Luftstreitkräfte	13	
Kurt Schoenfelder	Germany	Luftstreitkräfte	13<	
Frederick Sowrey	United Kingdom	Royal Flying Corps, Royal Air Force	13	Distinguished Service Order, Military Cross, Air Force Cross
Stanley Stanger	Canada	Royal Flying Corps, Royal Air Force	13	Military Cross, Distinguished Flying Cross
Eric John Stephens	Australia	Royal Flying Corps, Royal Air Force	13	Distinguished Flying Cross
Francis S. Symondson	United Kingdom	Royal Flying Corps	13	Military Cross, Italian Medal for Military Valor
John Howard Umney	United Kingdom	Royal Flying Corps, Royal Air Force	13	Military Cross
Desmond Uniacke	United Kingdom	Royal Flying Corps, Royal Air Force	13	
George Augustus Vaughn, Jr.	United States	Royal Flying Corps, Royal Air Force, US Army Air Service	13	British Distinguished Flying Cross, U. S. Distinguished Service Cross
Oliver H. D. Vickers	United Kingdom	Royal Flying Corps, Royal Air Force	13	
Erich Rüdiger von Wedel	Germany	Luftstreitkräfte	13	Royal House Order of Hohenzollern, Iron Cross
David John Weston	United Kingdom	Royal Flying Corps, Royal Air Force	13	Distinguished Flying Cross
Walter Bertram Wood	United Kingdom	Royal Flying Corps	13	Military Cross with Bar
John Oliver Andrews	United Kingdom	Royal Flying Corps, Royal Air Force	12	Distinguished Service Order, Military Cross with Bar
Bernard Artigau	France	Aéronautique Militaire	12	Légion d'honneur, Médaille militaire, Croix de Guerre with nine Palmes, Belgian Croix de guerre
Brian Edmund Baker	United Kingdom	Royal Flying Corps	12	Distinguished Service Order, Military Cross, Air Force Cross, French Croix de Guerre
Thomas Baker	Australia	Australian Flying Corps	12	Distinguished Flying Cross, Military Medal
Frank Baylies	United States	Aéronautique Militaire	12	French Médaille militaire, Croix de Guerre
Louis Bennett Jr.	United States	Royal Flying Corps, Royal Air Force	12	
Gerald A. Birks	Canada	Royal Flying Corps, Royal Air Force	12	Military Cross with Bar
Clement G. Boothroyd	United Kingdom	Royal Flying Corps, Royal Air Force	12	Distinguished Flying Cross
Christopher J. Q. Brand alias Quintin Brand	South Africa	Royal Flying Corps, Royal Air Force	12	Distinguished Service Order, Military Cross, Distinguished Flying Cross
Edwin C. Bromley	Canada	Royal Flying Corps, Royal Air Force	12	Military Cross
Raymond Brownell	Australia	Royal Flying Corps, Royal Air Force, Royal Australian Air Force	12	Military Cross, Military Medal. Rose to Air Commodore in RAAF.
Oliver Bryson	United Kingdom	Royal Flying Corps, Royal Air Force	12	Military Cross, Distinguished Flying Cross
Erich Buder	Germany	Luftstreitkräfte	12	Military Merit Cross, Iron Cross
Theodor Cammann	Germany	Luftstreitkräfte	12	
Walter M. Carlaw	United Kingdom	Royal Flying Corps, Royal Air Force	12	Distinguished Flying Cross
Percival V. G. Chambers	United Kingdom	Royal Flying Corps, Royal Air Force	12	
Edwin A. Clear	United Kingdom	Royal Flying Corps, Royal Air Force	12	Military Cross
Gustave Daladier	France	Aéronautique Militaire	12	Légion d'honneur, Médaille militaire, Croix de Guerre with nine Palmes. Also Chevalier du Ouissam Alaouite, Officier du Nichan Iftikar
Francis James Davies	United Kingdom	Royal Flying Corps, Royal Air Force	12	Distinguished Flying Cross
Joseph M. X. de Sévin	France	Aéronautique Militaire	12	Légion d'honneur, Croix de Guerre with nine Palmes, British Order of the British Empire
Gottfried Ehmann	Germany	Luftstreitkräfte	12	Military Merit Cross, Iron Cross
Otto Esswein	Germany	Luftstreitkräfte	12	Military Merit Cross, Iron Cross
Sebastian Festner	Germany	Luftstreitkräfte	12	Military Merit Cross, Iron Cross
Wilhelm Frickart	Germany	Luftstreitkräfte	12	Royal House Order of Hohenzollern, Iron Cross, Austro-Hungarian Medal for Bravery
Frank Godfrey	United Kingdom	Royal Flying Corps, Royal Air Force	12	Distinguished Flying Cross
Fernand Guyou	France	Aéronautique Militaire	12	Légion d'honneur, Médaille militaire, Croix de Guerre
Ernest Hardcastle	United Kingdom	Royal Flying Corps, Royal Air Force	12	Distinguished Flying Cross
William Leeming Harrison	Canada	Royal Flying Corps, Royal Air Force	12	Military Cross
Bertram Heinrich	Germany	Luftstreitkräfte	12	
Adolf Heyrowsky	Austria-Hungary	Luftfahrtruppen	12	Order of the Iron Crown
Walter Höhndorf	Germany	Luftstreitkräfte	12	Pour le Mérite, Royal House Order of Hohenzollern, Iron Cross
William Henry Hubbard	Canada	Royal Flying Corps, Royal Air Force	12	Distinguished Flying Cross
Gerhard Hubrich	Germany	Luftstreitkräfte	12	Scored 2 more victories in World War II.
Marcel A. Hugues	France	Aéronautique Militaire	12	Légion d'honneur, Croix de Guerre with eight Palmes, British Military Cross. Lieutenant Colonel in World War II.
John E. L. Hunter	United Kingdom	Royal Flying Corps	12	Distinguished Service Cross, Distinguished Flying Cross
Gordon Budd Irving	Canada	Royal Flying Corps, Royal Air Force	12	Distinguished Flying Cross
Lucien J. Jailler	France	Aéronautique Militaire	12	Légion d'honneur, Médaille militaire
William Stanley Jenkins	Canada	Royal Flying Corps, Royal Air Force	12	Distinguished Flying Cross with Bar
George Hubert Kemp	United Kingdom	Royal Flying Corps, Royal Air Force	12	
Hans von Keudell	Germany	Luftstreitkräfte	12	Royal House Order of Hohenzollern
Field E. Kindley	United States	Royal Air Force, US Army Air Service	12	Distinguished Service Cross, British Distinguished Flying Cross
Max Kuhn	Germany	Luftstreitkräfte	12	
Reed G. Landis	United States	Royal Air Force, US Army Air Service, United States Army Air Corps	12	Distinguished Service Cross, British Distinguished Flying Cross. Colonel during World War II.
Adrien L. J. Leps	France	Aéronautique Militaire	12	Légion d'honneur, Croix de Guerre with nine Palmes, 1939-45 Croix de Guerre, British Military Cross. Lieutenant colonel in World War II
Gwilym Hugh Lewis	United Kingdom	Royal Flying Corps	12	Distinguished Flying Cross
Alfred Lindenberger	Germany	Luftstreitkräfte, Luftwaffe	12	Scored 4 victories in World War II.
Frederic Ives Lord	United States	Royal Flying Corps, Royal Air Force	12	British Distinguished Flying Cross with Bar, Russian Order of Saint Stanilas
Charles J. V. Macé	France	Aéronautique Militaire	12	Médaille militaire, Croix de Guerre with seven Palmes
Friedrich Manschott	Germany	Luftstreitkräfte	12	Iron Cross
Roby Lewis Manuel	Australia	Australian Flying Corps, Royal Australian Air Force	12	Distinguished Flying Cross with Bar. Served in RAAF in World War II.
Roy Manzer	Canada	Royal Flying Corps, Royal Air Force	12	Distinguished Flying Cross
Norman Mawle	United Kingdom	Royal Flying Corps, Royal Air Force	12	Distinguished Flying Cross
Douglas McGregor	Canada	Royal Flying Corps, Royal Air Force	12	Military Cross
Kenneth Barbour Montgomery	United Kingdom	Royal Flying Corps, Royal Air Force	12	Military Cross, Italian War Cross
Josiah Lewis Morgan	United Kingdom	Royal Flying Corps, Royal Air Force	12	Military Cross
Hans Müller alias Hans Garrelt.	Germany	Luftstreitkräfte, Luftwaffe	12	Iron Cross.
Ian Napier	United Kingdom	Royal Flying Corps, Royal Air Force	12	Military Cross, French Légion d'honneur, French Croix de Guerre
Jean Navarre	France	Aéronautique Militaire	12	Légion d'honneur, Médaille militaire, Croix de Guerre with 12 Palmes
Walter Noble	United Kingdom	Royal Flying Corps, Royal Air Force	12	Distinguished Flying Cross
Charles Nuville	France	Aéronautique Militaire	12	Légion d'honneur, Croix de Guerre with five Palmes and five Étoiles de vermeil, Belgian Croix de guerre, Italian Medal of Valor. Lieutenant colonel in World War II
James William Pearson	United States	Royal Flying Corps, Royal Air Force	12	Distinguished Flying Cross. Claimed 33 victories.
Guy William Price	United Kingdom	Royal Naval Air Service	12	Distinguished Service Cross with Bar
John Steele Ralston	United Kingdom	Royal Flying Corps, Royal Air Force	12	Military Cross, Distinguished Flying Cross
Henry Coyle Rath	Canada	Royal Flying Corps, Royal Air Force	12	Distinguished Flying Cross
Cecil Roy Richards	Australia	Royal Flying Corps, Royal Air Force	12	Military Cross
Alfred William Saunders	United Kingdom	Royal Flying Corps, Royal Air Force	12	Distinguished Flying Cross
James Scaramanga	United Kingdom	Royal Flying Corps, Royal Air Force	12	
Franz Schleiff	Germany	Luftstreitkräfte	12	Royal House Order of Hohenzollern, Iron Cross
Maurice D. G. Scott	United Kingdom	Royal Flying Corps	12	Military Cross
Alexander MacDonald Shook	Canada	Royal Naval Air Service, Royal Air Force	12	Distinguished Service Order, Distinguished Service Cross, Air Force Cross, French Croix de Guerre
Ross MacPherson Smith	Australia	Australian Flying Corps	12	Military Cross with Bar, Distinguished Flying Cross with two Bars, Air Force Cross
Reginald Soar	United Kingdom	Royal Naval Air Service	12	Distinguished Service Cross
William Samuel Stephenson	Canada	Royal Flying Corps, Royal Air Force	12	Military Cross, Distinguished Flying Cross. Later headed BSC during World War II.
Leonard Taplin	Australia	Australian Flying Corps	12	Distinguished Flying Cross
Paul Tarascon	France	Aéronautique Militaire	12	Légion d'honneur, Médaille militaire, Croix de Guerre with 12 Palmes. Colonel during World War II
Renatus Theiller	Germany	Luftstreitkräfte	12<	
Chester Thompson	United Kingdom	Royal Flying Corps, Royal Air Force	12	
Adrian Tonks	United Kingdom	Royal Naval Air Service, Royal Air Force	12	Distinguished Flying Cross with Bar
Richard M. Trevethan	United Kingdom	Royal Flying Corps, Royal Air Force	12	Military Cross
Bernhard Ultsch	Germany	Luftstreitkräfte	12	Iron Cross, Military Merit Cross
Melville Wells Waddington	Canada	Royal Flying Corps, Royal Air Force	12	
Paul Y. R. Waddington	France	Aéronautique Militaire	12	Légion d'honneur, Croix de Guerre with five Palmes plus an Étoile de vermeil, an Étoile d'argent, and an Étoile de bronze
Dennis Waight	United Kingdom	Royal Flying Corps, Royal Air Force	12	Military Cross
Clive W. Warman	United States	Royal Flying Corps, Royal Air Force	12	British Distinguished Service Order, Military Cross
Richard Wenzl	Germany	Luftstreitkräfte	12	Royal House Order of Hohenzollern, Iron Cross First Class
James White	Canada	Royal Naval Air Service, Royal Air Force	12	Distinguished Flying Cross
Giovanni Ancillotto	Italy	Corpo Aeronautico Militare	11	1 Gold and 3 Silver Medal for Military Valor,
Heinrich Arntzen	Germany	Luftstreitkräfte	11	Royal House Order of Hohenzollern, Iron Cross
Fred Everest Banbury	Canada	Royal Naval Air Service, Royal Air Force	11	Distinguished Service Cross
Raven Freiherr von Barnekow	Germany	Luftstreitkräfte	11	Served as staff officer in World War II.
Harold F. Beamish	New Zealand	Royal Naval Air Service Royal Air Force	11	Distinguished Service Cross
Alexander Beck	Argentina	Royal Flying Corps, Royal Air Force	11	Distinguished Flying Cross
Armond J. Berthelot	France	Aéronautique Militaire	11	Légion d'honneur, Médaille militaire, Croix de Guerre with ten Palmes and an Étoile de bronze
Jean G. Bouyer	France	Aéronautique Militaire	11	Légion d'honneur, Médaille militaire, Croix de Guerre with eight Palmes and an Étoile d'argent, British Distinguished Conduct Medal
Jean Bozon-Verduraz	France	Aéronautique Militaire	11	Légion d'honneur, Médaille militaire, Croix de Guerre with eight Palmes plus and two Étoiles de vermeil and an Étoile de bronze, Russian Cross of Saint George fourth class
Philip Scott Burge	United Kingdom	Royal Flying Corps, Royal Air Force	11	Military Cross, Military Medal
Joachim von Busse	Germany	Luftstreitkräfte	11	Royal House Order of Hohenzollern, Iron Cross
Arnold Jacques Chadwick	Canada	Royal Naval Air Service	11	Distinguished Service Cross
Andre J. Chainat	France	Aéronautique Militaire	11	Légion d'honneur, Médaille militaire, Croix de Guerre with nine Palmes and an Étoile de bronze
Roy W. Chappell	United Kingdom	Royal Flying Corps, Royal Air Force	11	Military Cross
Friedrich Classen	Germany	Luftstreitkräfte	11	
Hugh Claye	United Kingdom	Royal Flying Corps, Royal Air Force	11	Military Cross
Clive Franklyn Collett	New Zealand	Royal Flying Corps, Royal Air Force	11	Military Cross with Bar
Thomas Colvill-Jones	Argentina	Royal Flying Corps, Royal Air Force	11	
Franz Xaver Danhuber	Germany	Luftstreitkräfte	11	Royal House Order of Hohenzollern
Hiram Frank Davison	Canada	Royal Flying Corps, Royal Air Force	11	Military Cross
Harold Day	United Kingdom	Royal Naval Air Service	11	Distinguished Service Cross
Andre de Meulemeester	Belgium	Belgian Military Aviation	11	Order of Leopold II, Croix de Guerre, French Croix de Guerre, Italian Medal for Military Valor
Kurt-Bertram von Döring	Germany	Luftstreitkräfte	11	Royal House Order of Hohenzollern, Iron Cross
Heinrich Drekman	Germany	Luftstreitkräfte	11	
William Duncan	Canada	Royal Flying Corps, Royal Air Force	11	Military Cross with Bar.
Trevor Durrant	United Kingdom	Royal Flying Corps, Royal Air Force	11	
Thomas Elliott	United Kingdom	Royal Air Force	11	
John C. B. Firth	United Kingdom	Royal Flying Corps, Royal Air Force	11	Military Cross, Italian Medal for Military Valor
Henry Garnet Forrest	Australia	Royal Flying Corps, Australian Flying Corps	11	Distinguished Flying Cross
William M. Fry	United Kingdom	Royal Flying Corps, Royal Air Force	11	Military Cross
Willi Gabriel	Germany	Luftstreitkräfte	11	Iron Cross
Frederick J. Gibbs	United Kingdom	Royal Flying Corps	11	Military Cross
Charles D. B. Green	Canada	Royal Flying Corps, Royal Air Force	11	Distinguished Flying Cross, French Croix de Guerre
Kurt Gruber	Austria-Hungary	Luftfahrtruppen	11	Two awards of the Silver Bravery Medal First Class, four Gold Bravery Medals
Thomas M. Harries	United Kingdom	Royal Flying Corps, Royal Air Force	11	Distinguished Flying Cross
John Herbert Hedley	United Kingdom	Royal Flying Corps, Royal Air Force	11	
André Herbelin	France	Aéronautique Militaire	11	Légion d'honneur, Médaille militaire, Croix de Guerre with seven Palmes
William Herisson	France	Aéronautique Militaire	11	Légion d'honneur, Médaille militaire, Croix de Guerre
Leslie Norman Hollinghurst	United Kingdom	Royal Flying Corps, Royal Air Force	11	Distinguished Flying Cross
Geoffrey H. Hooper	Australia	Royal Flying Corps, Royal Air Force, Royal Australian Air Force	11	Military Cross, Distinguished Flying Cross
Campbell Hoy	United Kingdom	Royal Flying Corps, Royal Air Force	11	Military Cross
Geoffrey Forrest Hughes	Australia	Royal Flying Corps, Royal Air Force	11	Military Cross, Air Force Cross
Patrick Huskinson	United Kingdom	Royal Flying Corps, Royal Air Force	11	Military Cross with Bar. Rose to Air Commodore.
William Roy Irwin	Canada	Royal Flying Corps, Royal Air Force, Royal Canadian Air Force	11	Order of the British Empire, Distinguished Flying Cross with Bar.
Mansell Richard James	Canada	Royal Flying Corps, Royal Air Force	11	Distinguished Flying Cross
George Owen Johnson	Canada	Royal Flying Corps, Royal Air Force, Royal Canadian Air Force	11	Military Cross, French Croix de Guerre. Rose to Air Marshal.
Arthur G. Jones-Williams	United Kingdom	Royal Flying Corps, Royal Air Force	11	Military Cross with Bar, French Croix de Guerre
Stefan Kirmaier	Germany	Luftstreitkräfte	11	Royal House Order of Hohenzollern, Iron Cross
Herbert Joseph Larkin	Australia	Royal Flying Corps, Royal Air Force	11	Distinguished Flying Cross, French Croix de Guerre
Maxime Lenoir	France	Aéronautique Militaire	11	Légion d'honneur, Médaille militaire, Croix de Guerre with eight Palmes
Fritz Loerzer	Germany	Luftstreitkräfte	11	
Walter H. Longton	United Kingdom	Royal Flying Corps, Royal Air Force	11	Distinguished Flying Cross with Bar, Air Force Cross
Emile John Lussier	United States	Royal Flying Corps, Royal Air Force, Royal Canadian Air Force	11	British Distinguished Flying Cross. Served in RCAF during World War II
Charles M. Maude	United Kingdom	Royal Flying Corps, Royal Air Force	11	Distinguished Flying Cross, French Croix de Guerre, Italian War Cross
Ernest Maunoury	France	Aéronautique Militaire	11	Légion d'honneur, Croix de Guerre with seven Palmes and an Étoile de vermeil
Malcolm C. McGregor	New Zealand	Royal Flying Corps, Royal Air Force	11	Distinguished Flying Cross with Bar
Finlay McQuistan	United Kingdom	Royal Flying Corps, Royal Air Force	11	Distinguished Flying Cross
James Hart Mitchell	United Kingdom	Royal Flying Corps, Royal Air Force	11	Military Cross, Distinguished Flying Cross, Italian Medal for Military Valor
René Montrion	France	Aéronautique Militaire	11	Médaille militaire, Croix de Guerre with seven Palmes and an Étoile de vermeil
Hans Nülle	Germany	Luftstreitkräfte	11	
Sydney A. Oades	United Kingdom	Royal Flying Corps, Royal Air Force	11	Military Cross
Harold Anthony Oaks	Canada	Royal Flying Corps, Royal Air Force	11	Distinguished Flying Cross. Member of Canadian Aviation Hall of Fame.
Jacques Ortoli	France	Aéronautique Militaire	11	Légion d'honneur, Médaille militaire, Croix de Guerre with seven Palmes and two Étoiles de bronze, British Military Cross, Belgian Croix de guerre
Herbert A. Patey	United Kingdom	Royal Naval Air Service, Royal Air Force	11	Distinguished Flying Cross
Leonard A. Payne	South Africa	Royal Flying Corps, Royal Air Force	11	Military Cross
Clement W. Payton	United Kingdom	Royal Naval Air Service, Royal Air Force	11	Distinguished Flying Cross, French Croix de Guerre, Belgian Croix de guerre
Hermann Pfeiffer	Germany	Luftstreitkräfte	11	Iron Cross
Reinhold Poss	Germany	Luftstreitkräfte	11	
George E. Randall	United Kingdom	Royal Flying Corps, Royal Air Force	11	Distinguished Flying Cross
Antonio Reali	Italy	Corpo Aeronautico Militare	11	Silver award of Medal for Military Valor
Hervey Rhodes	United Kingdom	Royal Flying Corps, Royal Air Force	11	Distinguished Flying Cross with Bar
Cyril Ridley	United Kingdom	Royal Naval Air Service, Royal Air Force	11	Distinguished Service Cross
Thomas Rose	United Kingdom	Royal Flying Corps, Royal Air Force	11	Distinguished Flying Cross
Franz Rudorfer	Austria-Hungary	Luftfahrtruppen	11	Order of the Iron Crown, Military Merit Cross. Self-taught pilot.
Ivan C. Sanderson	United Kingdom	Royal Air Force	11	
Hugo Schäfer	Germany	Luftstreitkräfte	11	
Ivan Smirnov	Russia	Imperial Army Air Service	11	Order of Saint George, Cross of Saint George, Order of Saint Stanilas, Order of Saint Anne, Order of Saint Vladimir, French Croix de Guerre, Serbian Order of the White Eagle.
Rudolf Stark	Germany	Luftstreitkräfte	11	Iron Cross First and Second Class, Military Merit Order
John Stevenson Stubbs	United Kingdom	Royal Flying Corps, Royal Air Force	11	Distinguished Flying Cross, Air Force Cross
Albert Gregory Waller	United Kingdom	Royal Naval Air Service, Royal Air Force	11	Military Cross
Arthur W. Wood	United Kingdom	Royal Naval Air Service, Royal Air Force	11	
Wilfred Ernest Young	United Kingdom	Royal Flying Corps	11	Distinguished Flying Cross
