= Adrian Tonks =

British WWI flying ace (1898–1919)

Adrian James Boswell Tonks
- Born: 10 May 1898; Solihull, Warwickshire, England
- Died: 14 July 1919 (aged 21); Alexandria, Egypt
- Burial place: Hadra War Memorial Cemetery, Alexandria, Egypt; 31°12′12″N 29°55′21″E
- Military career
- Allegiance: United Kingdom
- Branch: Royal Navy; Royal Air Force
- Service years: 1916–1919
- Rank: Captain
- Units: No. 4 (Naval) Squadron RNAS/No. 204 Squadron RAF; No. 80 Squadron RAF
- Conflicts: World War I • Western Front
- Awards: Distinguished Flying Cross & bar

Captain Adrian James Boswell Tonks DFC* (10 May 1898 – 14 July 1919) was a British First World War flying ace. He was officially credited with twelve aerial victories, and was twice awarded the Distinguished Flying Cross.

== Early life and background ==
Tonks was born in Solihull, Warwickshire, the son of Arthur George Tonks, a mechanical engineer, and his wife Alice.

== World War I ==
Tonks entered the Royal Naval Air Service as a probationary flight sub-lieutenant with seniority from 13 August 1916. He received Royal Aero Club Aviator's Certificate No. 4206 after soloing a Maurice Farman biplane at the Royal Naval Air Service Training Establishment Cranwell on 28 December 1916.

In August 1917 Tonks was posted to No. 4 (Naval) Squadron to fly the Sopwith Camel single-seat fighter, gaining his first aerial victories during his first combat mission on 22 August, when he sent down two German Albatros D.V fighters out of control south-east of Ostend. On 9 November, it was a DFW reconnaissance two-seater that he put down out of control north of Pervijze, Belgium. On 23 November 1917, he scored another "out of control" victory east of Keiem, over another Albatros D.V.

Tonks was promoted to flight lieutenant on 1 January 1918. On 1 April 1918, the Royal Naval Air Service was merged with the Army's Royal Flying Corps to form the Royal Air Force, and No. 4 (Naval) became No. 204 Squadron RAF, and Tonks became a lieutenant with the honorary rank of captain in the new service.

He resumed scoring on 30 June 1918, driving down a Fokker D.VII out of control over Zeebrugge. On 8 July he was appointed a temporary captain. On both 10 and 13 August, he drove down another Fokker D.VII, the latter being flown by Leutnant Dieter Collin, the Staffelführer of Jasta 56. On 15 August, he sent down three Fokker D.VIIs out of control east of Ypres. On 28 September 1918, he destroyed a Fokker D.VII over Werken, and sent another down out of control. He then turned to low-altitude ground attack missions. until October 1918 when he was rested from combat.

Tonks won two Distinguished Flying Crosses in quick succession. The first one, awarded on 2 November 1918, was granted for his valour in aerial combat. His citation read:

Lieutenant (Temporary Captain) Adrian James Boswell Tonks (Sea Patrol).

A brave and determined airman who has destroyed four enemy aeroplanes and driven down six out of control. In a recent engagement with twelve enemy scouts he destroyed one and drove off others who were attacking some pilots in his flight. In these combats he expended all his ammunition, but seeing three enemy machines attacking one of ours, he, with great gallantry, dived amongst them with a view to distracting their attention. In this he succeeded. A courageous and meritorious action.

He received a Bar to the Distinguished Flying Cross in lieu of a second award on 3 December 1918. His citation read:

Lieutenant (Acting Captain) Adrian James Boswell Tonks, DFC. (Sea Patrol, Flanders)

Since 28 September this officer has led eleven low bombing raids, displaying conspicuous courage and skill, and inflicting serious damage on enemy from low altitudes. During bombing raids Capt. Tonks has destroyed two enemy machines, proving himself a bold and daring fighter.

=== List of aerial victories ===
Combat record
No.	Date/Time	Aircraft/ Serial No.	Opponent	Result	Location	Notes
No. 4 (Naval) Squadron RNAS
1	22 August 1917 @ 0945	Sopwith Camel (B3856)	Albatros D.V	Out of control	South-east of Ostend	
2	22 August 1917 @ 0945	Sopwith Camel (B3856)	Albatros D.V	Out of control	South-east of Ostend	
3	9 November 1917 @ 1330	Sopwith Camel (B6256)	DFW C	Out of control	North of Pervijze	
4	23 November 1917 @ 1400	Sopwith Camel (B6243)	Albatros D.V	Out of control	East of Keiem	
No. 204 Squadron RAF
5	30 June 1918 @ 1430	Sopwith Camel (D1824)	Fokker D.VII	Out of control	Zeebrugge	
6	10 August 1918 @ 1840	Sopwith Camel (C66)	Fokker D.VII	Out of control	Gistel	
7	13 August 1918 @ 1915	Sopwith Camel (C66)	Fokker D.VII	Out of control	South-east of Bailleul	Shared with Lieutenant Harold W. M. Cumming. Leutnant Dieter Collin, Staffelführer of Jasta 56. (KIA)
8	15 August 1918 @ 0830	Sopwith Camel (C66)	Fokker D.VII	Out of control	East of Ypres	
9	15 August 1918 @ 0830	Sopwith Camel (C66)	Fokker D.VII	Out of control	East of Ypres	
10	15 August 1918 @ 0830	Sopwith Camel (C66)	Fokker D.VII	Out of control	East of Ypres	
11	28 September 1918 @ 1230	Sopwith Camel (D9600)	Fokker D.VII	Destroyed	Werken	
12	28 September 1918 @ 1230	Sopwith Camel (D9600)	Fokker D.VII	Out of control	Werken	

== Post-war career ==
On 3 January 1919, Tonks was confirmed in his rank of captain. He was posted to No. 80 Squadron RAF in the Egyptian Expeditionary Force, based at RAF Aboukir, Alexandria, but on 13 July 1919 he crashed his Sopwith Pup at Cairo, and died from his injuries the following day. He is buried in plot B.158 in the Hadra War Memorial Cemetery in Alexandria.
