= Mansell Richard James =

Canadian aviator (born 1893)

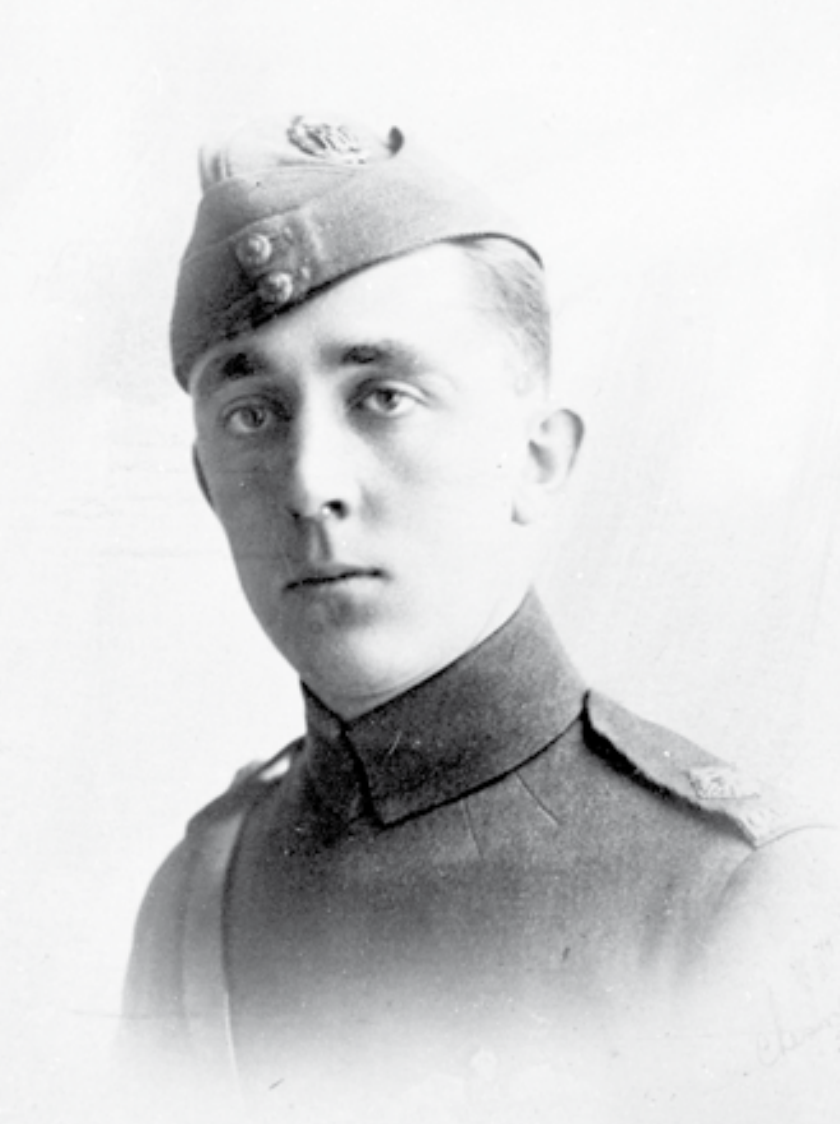
- Mansell James, with his RFC 'wings' and 'Canada' epaulette bar. Wearing the RFC 'maternity jacket'
- Born: 18 June 1893; Leamington, Ontario, Canada
- Died: c. 2 June 1919 (aged 25); Unknown; disappeared in New England
- Military career
- Allegiance: United Kingdom
- Branch: Royal Flying Corps
- Service years: 1917–1919
- Rank: Captain
- Unit: No. 45 Squadron RAF
- Conflicts: World War I; Italian Front
- Awards: Distinguished Flying Cross

Captain Mansell Richard James DFC (18 June 1893 – c. 2 June 1919) was a Canadian-born World War I flying ace credited with 11 confirmed aerial victories. He disappeared after setting a postwar aviation record for prize money, and was the object of repeated searches throughout the years.

== War service ==
James was living in Watford, Ontario, when he enlisted in the Royal Flying Corps, and was commissioned as a temporary second lieutenant on 22 September 1917. After the completion of his training, he was posted to No. 45 Squadron in Italy on 12 February 1918 as a Sopwith Camel pilot. On 3 June 1918, he scored his first aerial triumph, destroying an enemy Albatros D.V over Feltre. Four days later, he destroyed two Albatros D.IIIs, one over San Marino and the other over Colicella. His next two victories over Albatros D.Vs that he destroyed east of Feltre on 20 July made him an ace.

On 5 August 1918, he destroyed the only reconnaissance plane of his career, an AEG. The next day, he sent down two Albatros D.Vs over Segusino and destroyed a third. On the last day of August, he rounded out his victory string by destroying two Albatros D.Vs near Arsiero.

On 23 September 1918, Lieutenant James was promoted to temporary captain, and in November 1918 was awarded the Distinguished Flying Cross, with the following citation:

"An excellent scout pilot who has at all times shown great skill, courage and determination in attacking enemy machines. During a short period of time he has destroyed nine enemy aeroplanes".

On 6 May 1919, James surrendered his commission in the Royal Air Force upon being transferred to the unemployed list. He shipped out to the United States.

== Disappearance ==
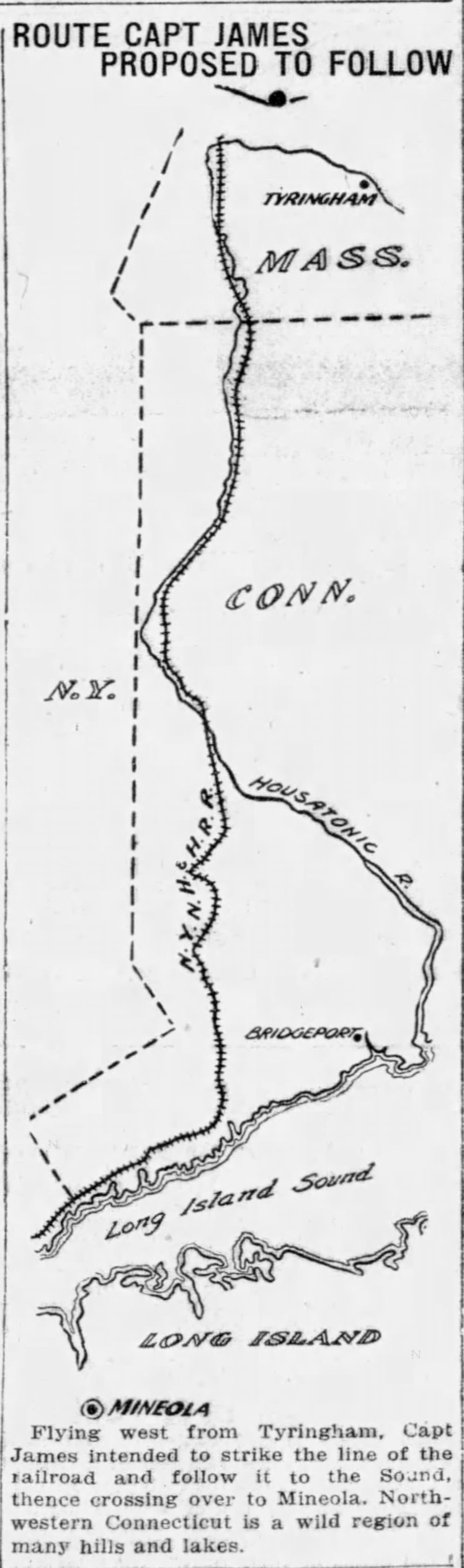
Map of James' intended route after leaving western Massachusetts

=== Final flight ===
On 28 May 1919, James flew what was reputedly the first Sopwith Camel in the United States, from Atlantic City, New Jersey, to Boston, Massachusetts. He was competing for a prize of $1,000 (equivalent to $18,570 in 2025) offered by The Boston Globe for fastest flight between the two cities. At 115 miles per hour (185 km/h) despite headwinds, he was much faster than a prior competitor's 90-mile-per-hour (140 km/h) gait.

After landing at a field 8 miles (13 km) north of Boston, James departed again at 6 pm, supposedly for a stop at Mitchel Field on Long Island en route to Atlantic City, both of which are southwest of Boston. He buzzed frightened spectators watching his takeoff. It was Captain James' intent to follow railroad tracks from Boston on his return flight. He apparently guided on the wrong set of railroad tracks, as he later landed at Tyringham, Massachusetts, about 100 miles (160 km) by air west of Boston, to have his aircraft serviced.

On 29 May, James was reportedly seen at 11:30 am at an altitude of about 5,000 feet (1,500 m) over Connecticut after departing Lee, Massachusetts; he apparently had a sound engine at that sighting and was headed southeast. A more reliable report tells a somewhat different story. On the morning of 2 June, James took off from Tyringham toward the south, then turned west, away from Boston. He drew a crowd of spectators for his departure because the local populace was not used to aircraft. Because of his direction of flight, they thought he might be returning to the field he departed, but he did not reappear.

=== Search efforts ===
Various search efforts were attempted in the years that followed James' disappearance. On 4 June 1919, it was reported that an aeroplane with its engine running had been heard near Millerton, New York. On 5 August 1919, a berry picker in a ravine on Mount Riga outside Millerton, New York, found aircraft wreckage, which was speculated to be James' plane.

In December 1925, a hunting party had found some apparent wreckage in the remote woods near Tyringham but did not think much of it at the time, and only in the weeks after returning did they realize the significance and mounted an unsuccessful search to relocate it. James's uncle had posted a reward for the recovery of his nephew's remains shortly after the disappearance, which was still being offered at the time.

On 19 May 1927, Coast Guard Boat 290 found an aircraft wing floating in Fort Pond Bay, Long Island Sound. Captain James' brother, E. D. James, wrote a letter requesting a description of the wing, hoping to identify it. There was another report that his plane might have gone down in a river at Poughkeepsie, New York, but nothing was found.

Despite extensive searches for James, spurred partially by rewards offered, no sign of James has ever been found, and the aircraft debris that had been found was never positively identified as being from his plane.

== See also ==
- List of people who disappeared mysteriously: 1910–1990
- List of World War I aces credited with 11–14 victories
