= Francis S. Symondson =

British flying ace (1897–1975)

Francis Stanley Symondson
- Born: 27 March 1897; Sutton, Surrey, England
- Died: 1 May 1975 (aged 78)
- Military career
- Allegiance: United Kingdom
- Branch: British Army; Royal Air Force
- Service years: 1914–1919; 1921; 1939–1943
- Rank: Captain
- Units: Honourable Artillery Company; Glamorgan Yeomanry; No. 29 Squadron RFC; No. 66 Squadron RAF
- Conflicts: World War I • Sinai and Palestine campaign • Western Front • Italian Front; World War II
- Awards: Military Cross; Silver Medal of Military Valor (Italy)

Captain Francis Stanley Symondson MC (27 March 1897 – 1 May 1975) was a British World War I flying ace credited with 13 confirmed aerial victories. He survived over three years of ground warfare and overcame early setbacks as a fighter pilot on the Western Front to become an ace in Italy.

== Early life ==
Symondson was born in Sutton (then part of Surrey), the second of three sons born to Stanley Vernon Symondson, a ship broker, and his wife Jesse Kate (née Uridge). The census of March 1901 found him boarding in Margate, Kent. Symondson first flew before the war in a Bleriot aircraft with Frank Goodden in June 1914.

== World War I service ==
Symondson served three-and-a-half years in the infantry before transferring to the Royal Flying Corps. He first served as a trumpeter in the Honourable Artillery Company, before being commissioned as a second lieutenant in the 25th (County of London) Cyclist Battalion, The London Regiment, on 18 March 1915. He later transferred to the Glamorgan Yeomanry (Welch Regiment), and was serving in Egypt when he was seconded to the Royal Flying Corps, in which he was appointed a Flying officer on 23 May 1917. He was promoted to lieutenant on 1 July.

He was posted to No. 29 Squadron in France on 4 September 1917. He crashed three of the squadron's Nieuports in the next 16 days, and was sent back to England for further training. He was then posted to Italy to join No. 66 Squadron as a Sopwith Camel pilot. On 7 March 1918, he set fire to a kite balloon at Chiarano for his first victory. It was the beginning of a string of a dozen enemy losses, as Symondson destroyed another balloon and ten aircraft by 28 August 1918. On 15 September, he drove down an Austrian-Hungarian Berg D.I out of control for his thirteenth win. The following day, his Military Cross was gazetted. The citation read:

Lieutenant Francis Stanley Symondson, Yeomanry and Royal Air Force.

"For conspicuous gallantry and devotion to duty. In two months he destroyed five enemy machines and one enemy kite balloon."

In November 1918 he was awarded the Silver Medal for Military Valour by the Italian government.

Symondson's victories included an observation balloon set on fire, another destroyed, two Albatros D.V fighters shot down in flames, seven other opposing fighters destroyed, an enemy reconnaissance aircraft destroyed, and another driven down.

=== List of aerial victories ===
Combat record
No.	Date/Time	Aircraft/ Serial No.	Opponent	Result	Location
1	7 March 1918 @ 1015	Sopwith Camel (B2445)	Balloon	Destroyed in flames	Chiarano
2	16 March 1918 @ 1200	Sopwith Camel (B2445)	Berg D.I	Destroyed	Col la Parada
3	30 March 1918 @ 1315	Sopwith Camel (B7353)	Albatros D.III	Destroyed	Mt. Maletto
4	4 April 1918 @ 0915	Sopwith Camel (B7353)	Albatros D.V	Destroyed	Brenta River at Cismon
5	17 April 1918 @ 1415–1425	Sopwith Camel (B7353)	Albatros D.III	Destroyed in flames	South of Giacomo
6	17 April 1918 @ 1415–1425	Sopwith Camel (B7353)	Albatros D.III	Destroyed in flames	South of Giacomo
7	6 May 1918 @ 1040–1042	Sopwith Camel (B7353)	Albatros D.III	Destroyed	Motta
8	6 May 1918 @ 1040–1042	Sopwith Camel (B7353)	Albatros D.III	Destroyed	Motta
9	6 June 1918 @ 1225	Sopwith Camel (D1912)	Albatros D.V	Destroyed	Zangetti
10	15 June 1918 @ 0810	Sopwith Camel (D9406)	Albatros D.V	Destroyed	Val d'Assa
11	13 August 1918 @ 0935	Sopwith Camel (D9390)	Balloon	Destroyed	West of Conegliano
12	28 August 1918 @ 1705	Sopwith Camel (D9390)	Aviatik C	Destroyed	South of Feltre
13	15 September 1918 @ 0830	Sopwith Camel (E1577)	Berg D.I	Out of control	North-east of Feltre

== Inter-war career ==
Symondson was transferred to the RAF unemployed list on 6 June 1919. He was briefly restored to the active list as a flying officer for temporary duty between 9 April and 5 June 1921. On 26 June 1924 Symondson enlisted in the Territorial Army, losing his right to retain his RAF rank.

By 1929, he was married to Betty Symondson; she was named to probate a will on 17 June 1929.

He remained a recreational pilot throughout the 1930s. He was both entrant and pilot of the Gypsy Moth G-AARU during the King's Cup Race in June 1930, but dropped out of the event en route. He competed in the same event the following year, flying the same aircraft, sponsored by the Royal Aero Club. He was placed as high as fifth place at one point. A month later, in July 1931, at the opening of Plymouth airport, he also flew aerobatics for His Royal Highness, The Prince of Wales. Symondson flew in Jubilee Week during May 1935. As late as 1938, he was still flying and stunting a Gypsy Moth at an altitude of only 200 feet (61 m).

In 1933, while connected to Portsmouth, Southsea to Isle of Wight Aviation Ltd., Symondson became the first registered owner of a Wolseley Hornet Special -Eustace Watkins Daytona- , registration OD 7086. The car, chassis number 113|114, survives and is now in the Netherlands

== World War II ==
On 1 September 1939, two days before Britain's declaration of war on Germany, Symondson was commissioned into the Administrative and Special Duties Branch of the Royal Air Force Volunteer Reserve, serving as a flight lieutenant until finally resigning his commission on 21 June 1943. He then served in the Air Transport Auxiliary into late 1945.

Francis Stanley Symondson died in Bridport, Dorset, on 1 May 1975, at the age of 78.

== Bibliography ==
- Shores, Christopher F.; Franks, Norman & Guest, Russell F. (1990). Above the Trenches: a Complete Record of the Fighter Aces and Units of the British Empire Air Forces 1915–1920. London, UK: Grub Street. ISBN 978-0-948817-19-9.
