= Herbert A. Patey =

British World War I flying ace

Herbert Andrew Patey
- Born: 25 September 1898; London, England
- Died: 18 February 1919 (aged 20); London, England
- Burial place: Hampstead Cemetery, London, England
- Military career
- Allegiance: United Kingdom
- Branch: Royal Navy; Royal Air Force
- Rank: Captain
- Units: Royal Naval Division; No. 210 Squadron RAF
- Conflicts: World War I • Gallipoli Campaign • Western Front
- Awards: Distinguished Flying Cross

Captain Herbert Andrew Patey (25 September 1898 – 18 February 1919) was an English World War I flying ace credited with 11 aerial victories.

== World War I ==
Patey began his military career by joining the Royal Naval Division early in World War I. He served with them in both Egypt and Gallipoli, and was invalided back to England in September 1915. Two months later, the authorities realized he was underage, and discharged him. Nothing daunted, Patey rejoined the Royal Navy in March 1917, this time choosing the Royal Naval Air Service. Having completed his training, he was commissioned as a temporary flight sub-lieutenant on 13 November, and joined No. 10 (Naval) Squadron in January 1918, which became No. 210 Squadron RAF in April.

He began his victory string with No. 210 Squadron on 17 May, sharing in the shooting down of a Rumpler reconnaissance aircraft. On 11 June he was appointed a flight commander with the temporary rank of captain. By 3 September, his tally stood at 11, and he had been awarded the Distinguished Flying Cross. Two days later, he was shot down by Ludwig Beckmann of Jasta 56. He survived the resultant crashlanding, his Sopwith Camel relatively intact, to become a prisoner of war.

On 21 September 1918, while Patey was a prisoner, his Distinguished Flying Cross was gazetted. The citation read:

Lieutenant (Temporary Captain) Herbert Andrew Patey (Sea Patrol).

"Whilst leading his flight on an offensive patrol eight enemy machines were encountered. Captain Patey was cut off from his patrol by two of the enemy who got on his tail and continued in that position until within 2,000 feet of the ground, at which point his machine was hit in the petrol tank. Notwithstanding his serious handicap, he turned four times on his pursuers, destroying one, and driving the remainder away. On previous occasions this officer has destroyed two enemy machines and brought down two more out of control, and, in company with other pilots, he has assisted in destroying or bringing down out of control five additional enemy aircraft."

List of aerial victories
| No. | Date/ Time | Aircraft/ Serial No. | Opponent | Result | Location | Notes |
|---|---|---|---|---|---|---|
| 1 | 17 May 1918; 11:05 | Sopwith Camel (D3391) | Rumpler C | Destroyed | North-east of Bailleul | Shared with Lieutenant Albert Leslie Jones |
| 2 | 21 May 1918; 11:20 | Sopwith Camel (B7849) | Balloon | Destroyed | Ploegsteert Wood | Shared with Lieutenants Hugh Maund and G. B. Wootten |
| 3 | 17 June 1918; 15:00 | Sopwith Camel (D3410) | Fokker D.VII | Destroyed | South-east of Zillebeke Lake | |
| 4 | 26 June 1918; 19:20 | Sopwith Camel (D9622) | Halberstadt C | Destroyed in flames | West of Armentières | |
| 5 | 29 June 1918; 19:30 | Sopwith Camel (D9622) | Fokker D.VII | Destroyed in flames | Armentières | Shared with Lieutenant W. W. Gyles |
| 6 | 16 July 1918; 11:55 | Sopwith Camel (B7280) | Fokker D.VII | Driven down out of control | Zeebrugge | |
| 7 | 20 July 1918; 09:50 | Sopwith Camel (B7280) | Fokker D.VII | Driven down out of control | South-east of Ostend | |
| 8 | 31 July 1918; 11:15 | Sopwith Camel (B7280) | Fokker D.VII | Destroyed | South-west of Gistel | |
| 9 | 1 August 1918; 19:25 | Sopwith Camel (B7280) | Fokker D.VII | Destroyed in flames | North of Lille | |
| 10 | 6 August 1918; 19:15 | Sopwith Camel (B7280) | Fokker D.VII | Destroyed | South-west of Gistel | |
| 11 | 3 September 1918; 18:30 | Sopwith Camel (B7280) | Fokker D.VII | Destroyed in flames | North-east of Roulers | |

== Post World War I ==
Patey was repatriated after the armistice at the end of World War I; he arrived home on Christmas Eve, 1918. He became a victim of the 1918 flu pandemic, dying of double pneumonia in West Hampstead on 18 February 1919.

Herbert Andrew Patey was buried in Plot P. 2. 38 of Hampstead Cemetery, Hampstead, England.

== Legacy ==
Herbert Patey's Sopwith Camel survived him. After being repaired and flown by the Germans until the end of the war, it was taken to Berlin for exhibit in an aviation museum. The advent of World War II saw it moved to Kraków, Poland, and stored to escape bombing raids. The Polish Aviation Museum recently restored it; restoration was basically complete by mid-2010.
