= Franz Piechulek =

- Born: Unknown
- Died: Unknown
- Military career
- Allegiance: Germany
- Branch: Aviation
- Rank: Leutnant
- Units: Kampfeinsitzerstaffel 5; Jagdstaffel 41: Jagdstaffel 56
- Awards: Iron Cross First Class

Leutnant Franz Piechulek was a German World War I flying ace credited with 14 aerial victories.

== World War I military service ==
He was assigned to Kampfeinsitzerstaffel 5 on 27 October 1917. He scored his first aerial victory there, downing a Nieuport on 22 November. He then moved on to Royal Prussian Jagdstaffel 41 on 14 December. On 5 January 1918, he set an enemy observation balloon afire for his second win. Four days later, he moved to Royal Prussian Jagdstaffel 56 to pilot an Albatros D.Va or a Fokker D.VII. He arrived the same day as his new Staffelführer, Franz Schleiff. Between 5 March and 4 October 1918, Piechulek rolled up another dozen triumphs, outlasting both Schlieff and his replacement, Dieter Collin.
