= Harry Gosford Reeves =

British flying ace

- Born: 30 September 1896; Staines, Middlesex, England
- Died: 24 January 1918 (aged 21)
- Burial place: Communal Cemetery Extension, Bailleul, Nord, France; 50°44′17″N 2°44′36″E
- Military career
- Allegiance: United Kingdom
- Branch: British Army
- Service years: 1917–1918
- Rank: Captain
- Unit: No. 1 Squadron RFC
- Conflicts: World War I • Western Front

Captain Harry Gosford Reeves (30 September 1896 – 24 January 1918) was a British World War I flying ace credited with 13 aerial victories while flying various models of Nieuport aircraft. He was killed in a crash while flight testing a Nieuport 27.

== Biography ==
Reeves was born in Staines, Middlesex, and educated at St. John's College, Hurstpierpoint, Sussex.

He joined the Royal Flying Corps in early 1917 as a temporary second lieutenant (on probation), and was appointed a flying officer on 19 May. Reeves was then posted to No. 1 Squadron, flying a Nieuport 23, where he quickly began to gain success in the air, accounting for two enemy aircraft in June, one in July and three in August. Another three victories come in September, and he celebrated being appointed a flight commander with the temporary rank of captain on 9 October 1917, by accounting for another enemy aircraft, bringing his total to eight. He then flew a Nieuport 27, gaining five more victories, the last being on 18 November 1917.

On 24 January 1918 Reeves was flight testing a new aircraft behind the British lines in France, when it crashed and he was killed. He is buried in the Communal Cemetery Extension, Bailleul, Nord, France.

=== List of aerial victories ===
Combat record
No.	Date/Time	Aircraft/ Serial No.	Opponent	Result	Location	Notes
1	18 June 1917 @ 1145	Nieuport 23 (B1650)	Albatros D.III	Destroyed	Oosttaverne	Shared with Lieutenants; Louis Jenkin & Charles Lavers.
2	26 June 1917 @ 2100	Nieuport 23 (B1630)	Albatros D.III	Driven down out of control	Becelaere	
3	31 July 1917 @ 1425	Nieuport 23 (B1672)	Albatros D.V	Destroyed	South of Terhand	
4	13 August 1917 @ 0920	Nieuport 23 (B1672)	Albatros C	Driven down out of control	Houthem	Shared with Captain Thomas Hazell.
5	14 August 1917 @ 1910	Nieuport 23 (B3558)	Albatros D.V	Destroyed	South of Moorslede	
6	21 August 1917 @ 1910	Nieuport 23 (B1672)	Albatros D.V	Driven down out of control	Houthoulst	
7	4 September 1917 @ 1115	Nieuport 23 (B1672)	DFW C	Driven down out of control	South of Polygon Wood	
8	9 September 1917 @ 1035	Nieuport 23 (B1672)	Rumpler C	Driven down out of control	East of Polygon Wood	
9	11 September 1917 @ 1815	Nieuport 27 (B3630)	Albatros D.V	Driven down out of control	Houthoulst Forest	
10	9 October 1917 @ 1515	Nieuport 27 (B6774)	Albatros D.V	Destroyed in flames	South of Polygon Wood	
11	15 October 1917 @ 1200	Nieuport 27 (B6774)	DFW C	Destroyed	Comines	
12	17 October 1917 @ 1430	Nieuport 27 (B6774)	Albatros D.V	Driven down out of control	Geluwe	
13	18 November 1917 @ 0815	Nieuport 27 (B6774)	DFW C	Driven down out of control	Becelaere	

== See also ==
- Aerial victory standards of World War I
- List of World War I aces credited with 11–14 victories
