= Sopwith Camel =

British WW1 biplane fighter aircraft

Camel
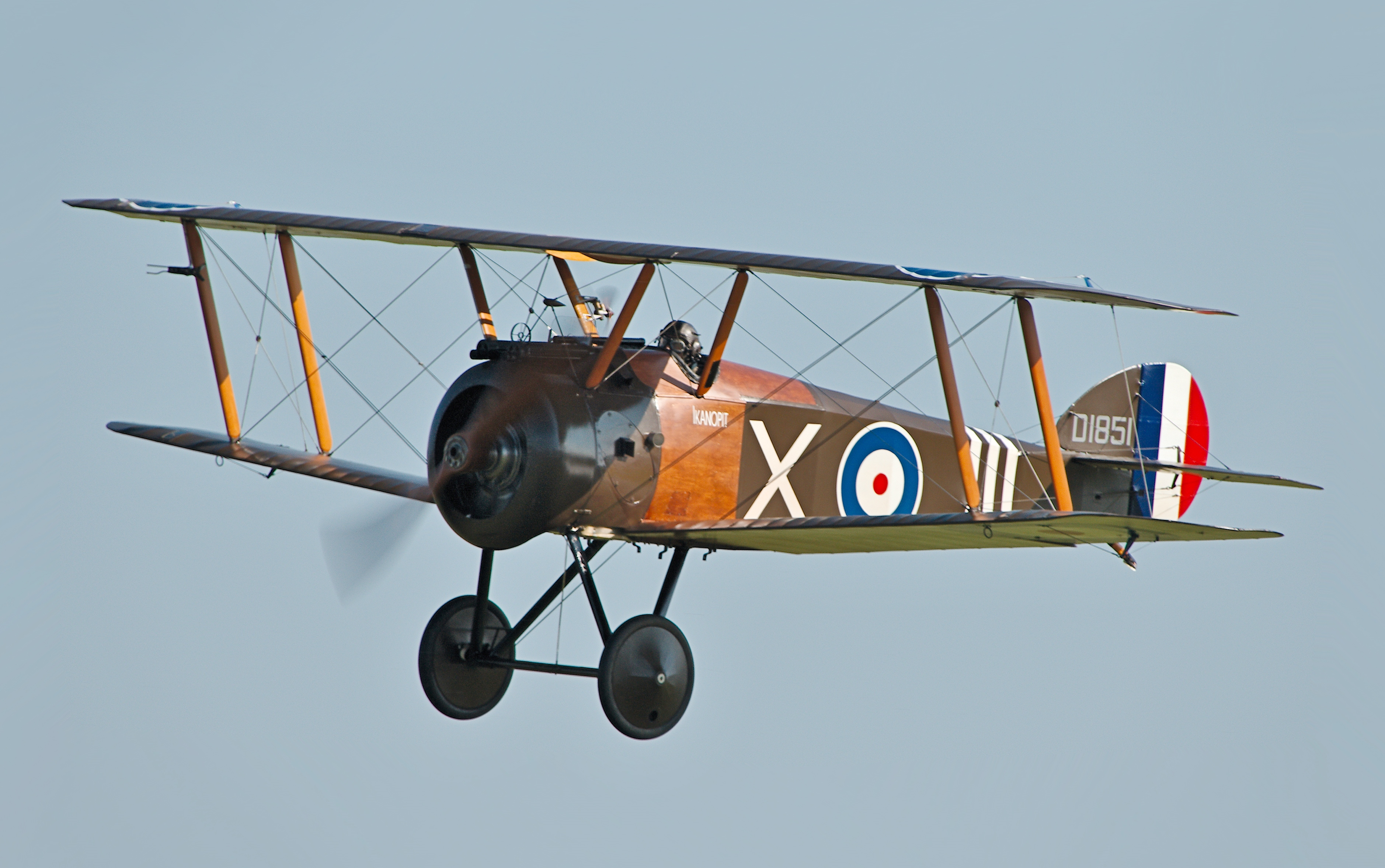
- Sopwith Camel

General information
- Type: Biplane fighter
- Manufacturer: Sopwith Aviation Company
- Designer: Herbert Smith
- Primary users: Royal Flying Corps Royal Naval Air Service; Royal Air Force
- Number built: 5,490

History
- Introduction date: June 1917
- First flight: 22 December 1916
- Retired: January 1920
- Developed from: Sopwith Pup

The Sopwith Camel is a British First World War single-seat biplane fighter aircraft that was introduced on the Western Front in 1917. It was developed by the Sopwith Aviation Company as a successor to the Sopwith Pup and became one of the best-known fighter aircraft of the Great War. Pilots flying Camels were credited with downing 1,294 enemy aircraft, more than any other Allied fighter of the conflict. Towards the end of the war, Camels lost their edge as fighters and were also used as a ground-attack aircraft.

The Camel was powered by a single rotary engine and was armed with twin synchronized 0.303 in (7.70 mm) Vickers machine guns. It was difficult to fly, with 90% of its weight in the front two metres (seven feet) of the aircraft, but it was highly manoeuvrable in the hands of an experienced pilot, a vital attribute in the relatively low-speed, low-altitude dogfights of the era.

The main variant of the Camel was designated as the F.1. Other variants included the 2F.1 Ship's Camel, which operated from aircraft carriers; the Comic night fighter variant; and the T.F.1, a "trench fighter" armoured for attacks on heavily defended ground targets. A two-seat variant served as a trainer. The last Camels were withdrawn from RAF service in January 1920.

== Development ==
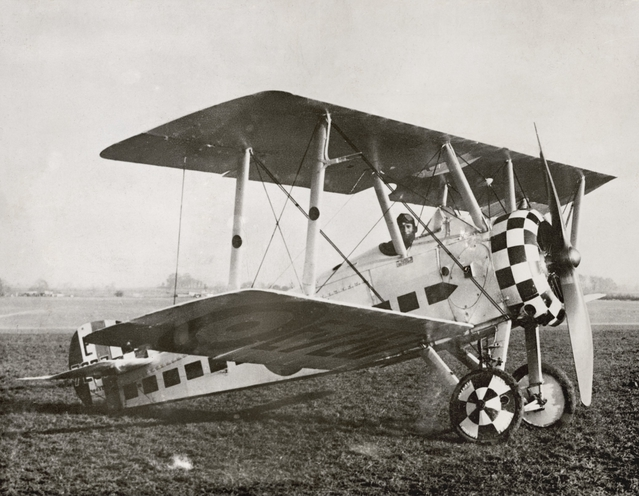
Harry Cobby sitting in the cockpit of a Sopwith Camel

When it became clear the Sopwith Pup was no match for the newer German fighters such as the Albatros D.III, the Camel was developed to replace it, as well as the Nieuport 17s that had been purchased from the French as an interim measure. It was recognised that the new fighter needed to be faster and have a heavier armament. The design effort to produce this successor, initially designated as the Sopwith F.1, was headed by Sopwith's chief designer, Herbert Smith.

Early in its development, the Camel was simply referred to as the "Big Pup". A metal fairing over the gun breeches, intended to protect the guns from freezing at altitude, created a "hump" that led pilots to call the aircraft "Camel", although this name was never used officially. On 22 December 1916, the prototype Camel was first flown by Harry Hawker at Brooklands, Weybridge, Surrey; it was powered by a 110-horsepower (82 kW) Clerget 9Z.

In May 1917, the first production contract for an initial batch of 250 Camels was issued by the British War Office. Throughout 1917, a total of 1,325 Camels were produced, almost entirely the initial F.1 variant. By the time that production of the type came to an end, approximately 5,490 Camels of all types had been built. In early 1918, production of the naval variant of the Sopwith Camel, the "Ship's" Camel 2F.1 began.

== Design ==
=== Overview ===
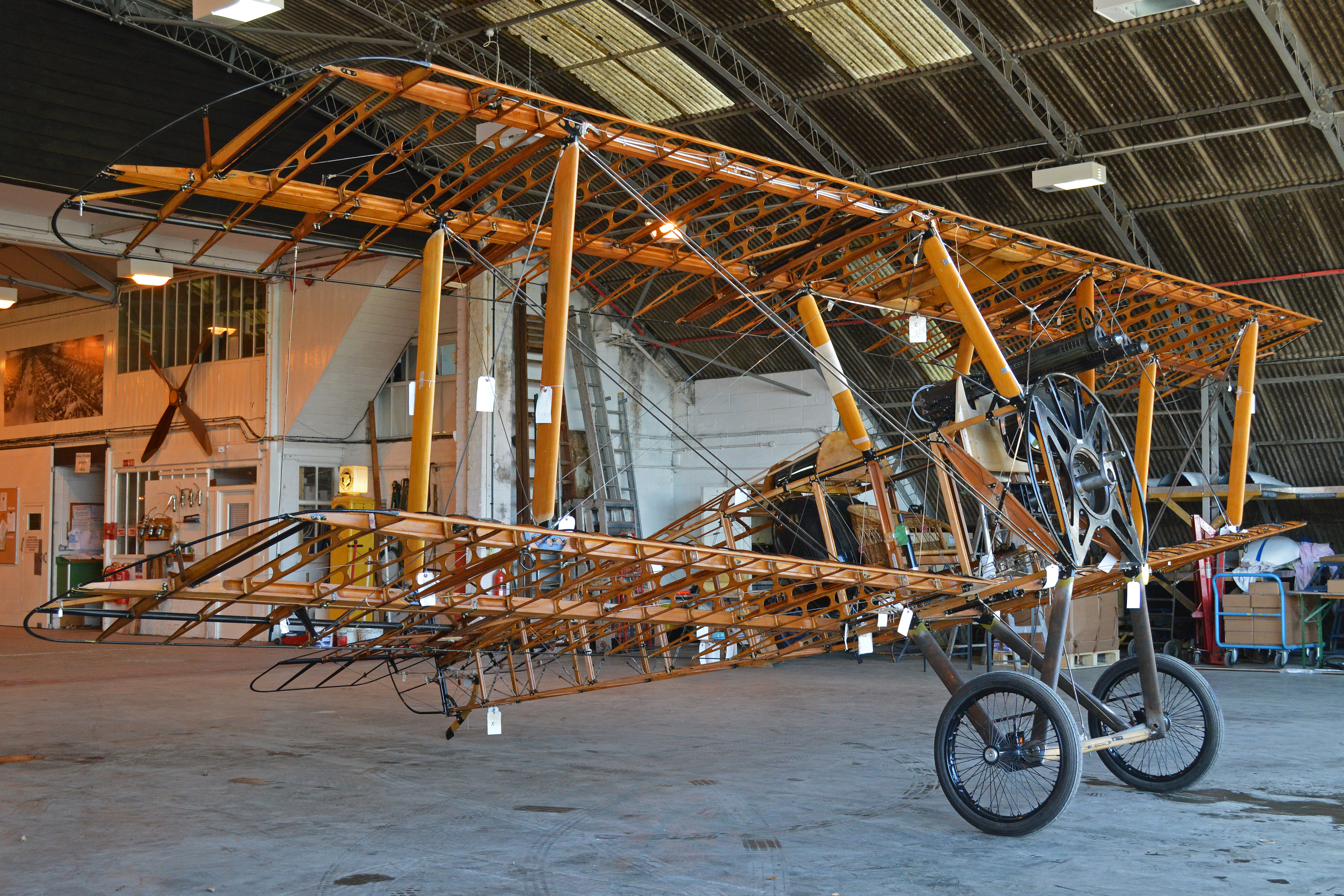
Replica Sopwith Camel showing internal structure

The Camel had a conventional design for its era, with a wire-braced wooden box-girder fuselage structure, an aluminium engine cowling, plywood panels around the cockpit, and a fabric-covered fuselage, wings and tail. While possessing some clear similarities with the Pup, it had a noticeably bulkier fuselage. For the first time on an operational British-designed fighter, two 0.303 in (7.7 mm) Vickers machine guns were mounted directly in front of the cockpit, synchronised to fire forwards through the propeller disc – initially this was the Sopwith firm's own synchronizer design, but after the mechanical-linkage Sopwith-Kauper units began to wear out, the more accurate and easier-to-maintain hydraulic-link Constantinesco-Colley system replaced it from November 1917 onward. In addition to the machine guns, a total of four Cooper bombs could be carried for ground attack purposes.

The bottom wing was rigged with 5° dihedral while the top wing lacked any dihedral; this meant that the gap between the wings was less at the tips than at the roots; this change had been made at the suggestion of Fred Sigrist, the Sopwith works manager, as a measure to simplify the aircraft's construction. The upper wing had a central cutout section to improve upwards visibility for the pilot.

Production Camels were powered by various rotary engines, most commonly either the Clerget 9B or the Bentley BR1. In order to evade a potential manufacturing bottleneck being imposed upon the overall aircraft in the event of an engine shortage, several other engines were adopted to power the type as well.

=== Flight characteristics ===
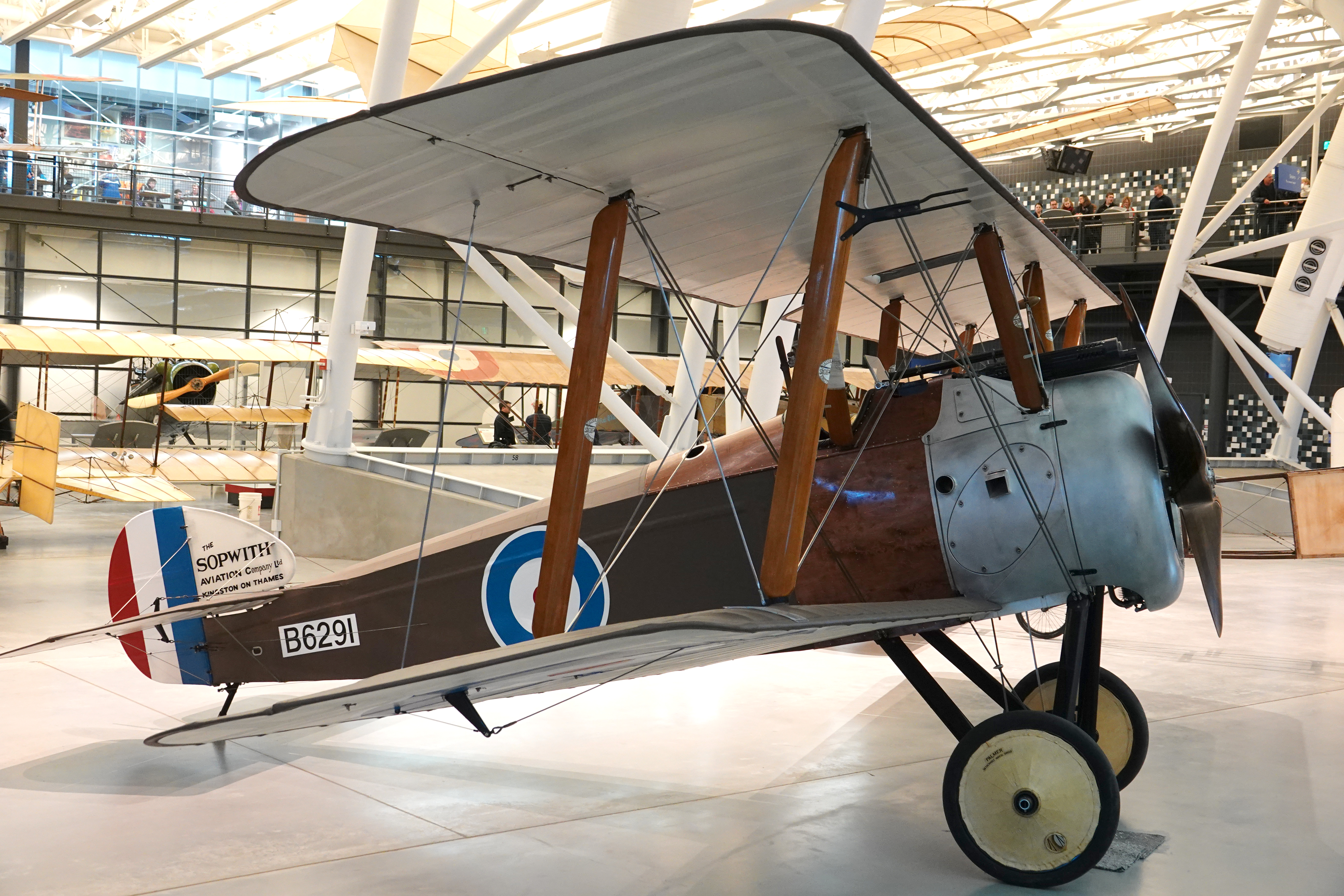
1917 Sopwith F.1 Camel at Steven F. Udvar-Hazy Center

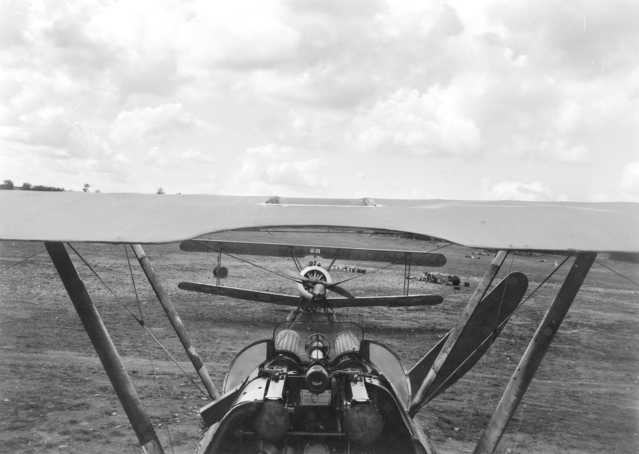
Pilot's view from the cockpit of a Camel, June 1918

Unlike the preceding Pup and Triplane, the Camel was considered to be difficult to fly. With light and sensitive controls the type owed both its extreme manoeuvrability and its difficult handling to the close placement of the engine, pilot, guns and fuel tank (some 90% of the aircraft's weight) within the front seven feet (2.1 m) of the aircraft, and to the strong gyroscopic effect of the rotating mass of the cylinders common to rotary engines. (Note: As compared with radial engines in which a conventional rotating crankshaft is driven by a fixed engine block.)

Due to the torque of the rotary engine the Camel turned more slowly to the left, which resulted in a nose-up attitude, but the torque also resulted in being able to turn to the right quicker than other fighters, although that resulted in a tendency towards a nose-down attitude from the turn. Because of the faster turning capability to the right, some pilots preferred to change heading 90° to the left by turning 270° to the right.

Upon entering service, the Camel gained an unfortunate reputation with pilots, with inexperienced ones crashing on take-off when the full fuel load pushed the aircraft's centre of gravity beyond the rearmost safe limit.

When in level flight, the Camel was markedly tail-heavy. Unlike the Sopwith Triplane, the Camel lacked a variable incidence tailplane, so that the pilot had to apply constant forward pressure on the control stick to maintain a level attitude at low altitude. The aircraft could be rigged so that at higher altitudes it could be flown "hands off". A stall immediately resulted in a dangerous spin. RFC pilots used to joke that it offered the choice between "a wooden cross, the Red Cross, or a Victoria Cross".

A two-seat trainer version was later built to ease the transition process: in his Recollections of an Airman, Lieutenant Colonel L. A. Strange, who served with the central flying school, wrote: "In spite of the care we took, Camels continually spun down out of control when flew [sic] by pupils on their first solos. At length, with the assistance of Lieut Morgan, who managed our workshops, I took the main tank out of several Camels and replaced [them] with a smaller one, which enabled us to fit in dual control." Such conversions, and dual instruction, went some way to alleviating the previously unacceptable casualties incurred during the critical type-specific solo training stage.

Despite these issues, its agility in combat made the Camel one of the best-remembered Allied aircraft of the First World War. Aviation author Robert Jackson notes that: "in the hands of a novice it displayed vicious characteristics that could make it a killer; but under the firm touch of a skilled pilot, who knew how to turn its vices to his own advantage, it was one of the most superb fighting machines ever built".

== Operational history ==
=== Western front ===
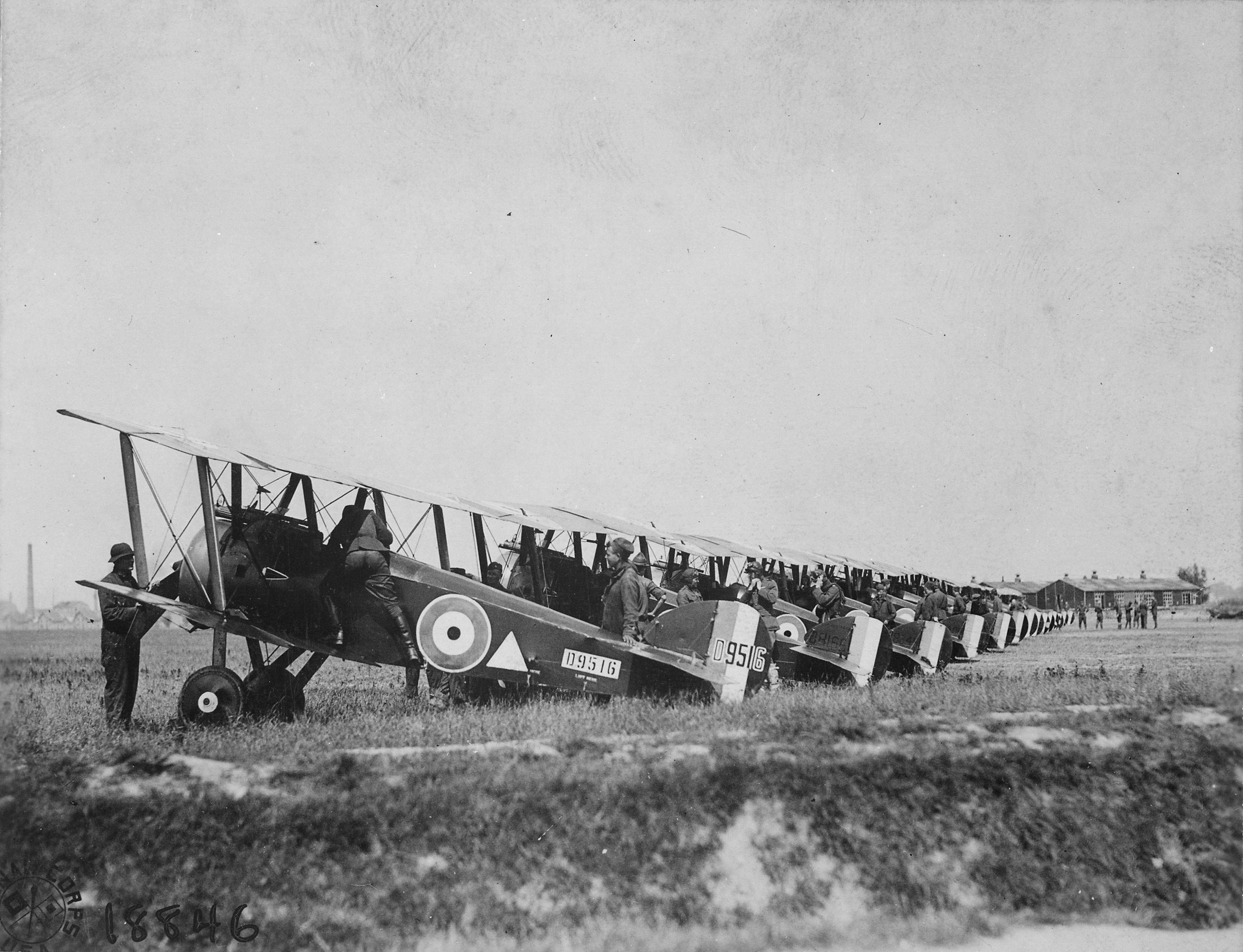
Camels being prepared for a sortie.

In June 1917, the Sopwith Camel entered service with No. 4 Squadron of the Royal Naval Air Service, which was stationed near Dunkirk, France; this was the first squadron to operate the type. Its first combat flight and reportedly its first victory claim were both made on 4 July 1917. By the end of July, the Camel also equipped No. 3 and No. 9 Naval Squadrons; and it had become operational with No. 70 Squadron of the Royal Flying Corps. By February 1918, 13 squadrons had Camels as their primary equipment. The Camel proved in service to have better manoeuvrability than the Albatros D.III and D.V and offered heavier armament and better performance than the Pup and Triplane. Together with the S.E.5a and the SPAD S.XIII, it helped to re-establish the Allied aerial superiority for a time. While flying a Sopwith Camel with the serial number B6313, the Canadian ace Billy Barker was credited with shooting down 46 aircraft. The total aircraft credited to Barker while flying B6313 is the highest attributed to a single aircraft during the war.

=== Home defence and night fighting ===
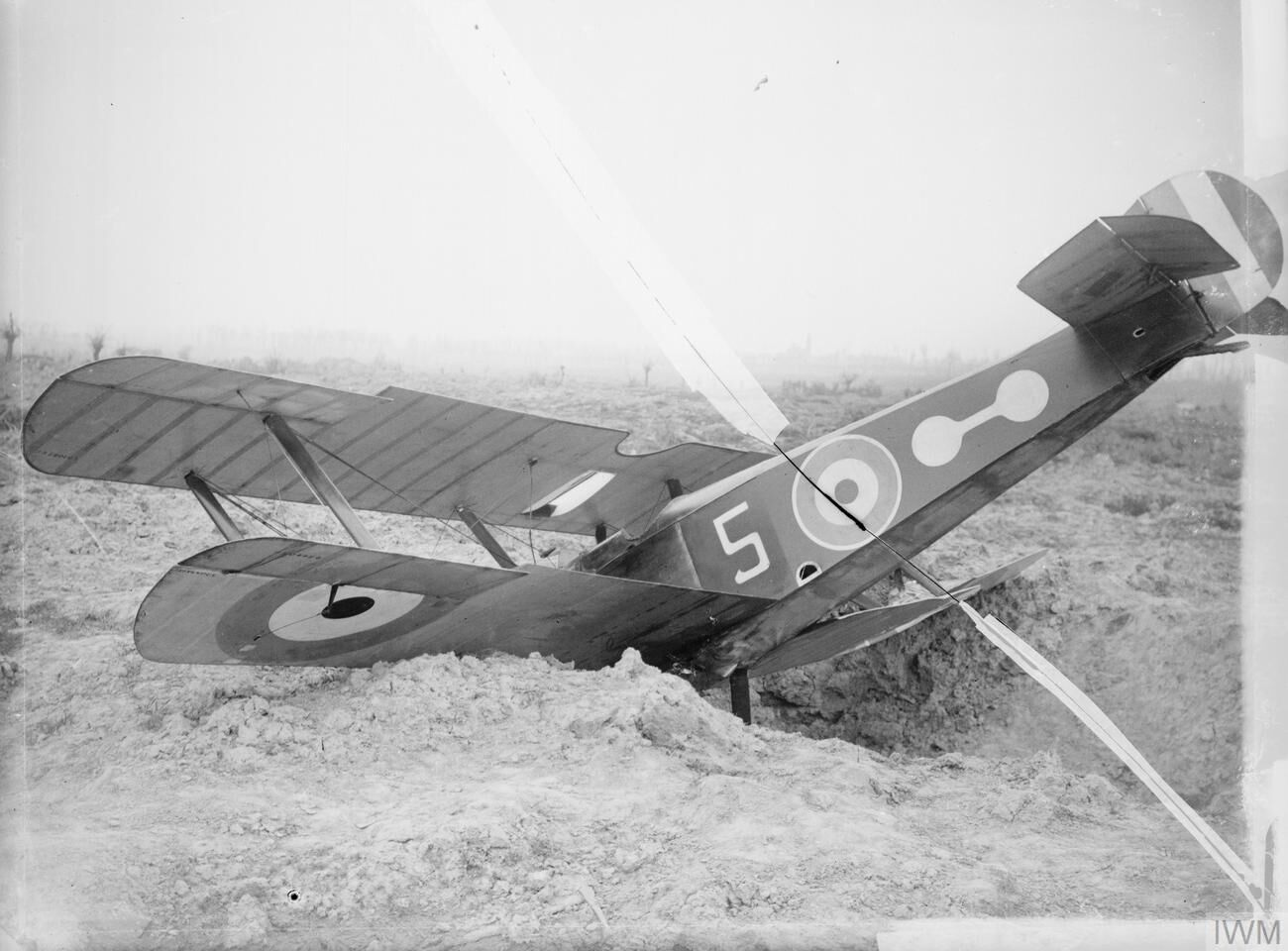
A downed Sopwith Camel near Zillebeke, West Flanders, Belgium, 26 September 1917

An important role for the Camel was home defence. The RNAS flew Camels from Eastchurch and Manston airfields against daylight raids by German bombers, including Gothas, from July 1917. The public outcry against the night raids and the poor response of London's defences resulted in the RFC deciding to divert Camels that had been heading to the frontlines in France to Britain for the purposes of home defence; in July 1917, 44 Squadron RFC reformed and reequipped with the Camel to conduct the home defence mission. By March 1918, the home defence squadrons had been widely equipped with the Camel and by August 1918, a total of seven home defence squadrons were operating these aircraft.

When the Germans switched to performing night attacks, the Camel proved capable of being flown at night. Those aircraft assigned to home defence squadrons were quickly modified with navigation lights to serve as night fighters. A smaller number of Camels were more extensively changed; on these aircraft, the Vickers machine guns were replaced by over-wing Lewis guns and the cockpit was moved rearwards so the pilot could reload the guns. This modification, which became known as the "Sopwith Comic" allowed the guns to be fired without affecting the pilot's night vision and allowed the use of new, more effective incendiary ammunition that was considered unsafe to fire from synchronised Vickers guns. (Note: The ammunition in question was the RTS (Richard Thelfall and Sons) round, a combined incendiary and explosive round with a nitroglycerin and phosphorus filling. While more effective than earlier incendiary bullets such as the phosphorus-filled Buckingham bullet, they required careful handling, and were initially banned from synchronised weapons, because of fears about the consequences of bullets striking the propeller of the fighter, and to prevent cooking off of the sensitive ammunition in the chambers of the Vickers guns, which fired from a closed bolt—a required feature for guns used in synchronized mounts—where heat could build up much quicker than in the open bolted Lewis gun.)

The Camel was used to intercept and shoot down German bombers on several occasions during 1918, serving in this capacity through] to the final German bombing raid upon Britain on the night of the 20/21 May 1918. During this air raid, a combined force of 74 Camels and S.E.5s intercepted 28 Gothas and Zeppelin-Staaken R.VIs; three German bombers were shot down, while two more were downed by anti-aircraft fire and a further aircraft was lost to engine failure, resulting in the heaviest losses suffered by German bombers during a single night's operation over England.

The Camel night fighter was also operated by 151 Squadron to intercept German night bombers operating over the Western Front. These aircraft also carried out night intruder missions against German airstrips. After five months of operations, 151 Squadron had claimed responsibility for shooting down 26 German aircraft.

=== Shipboard and parasite fighter ===
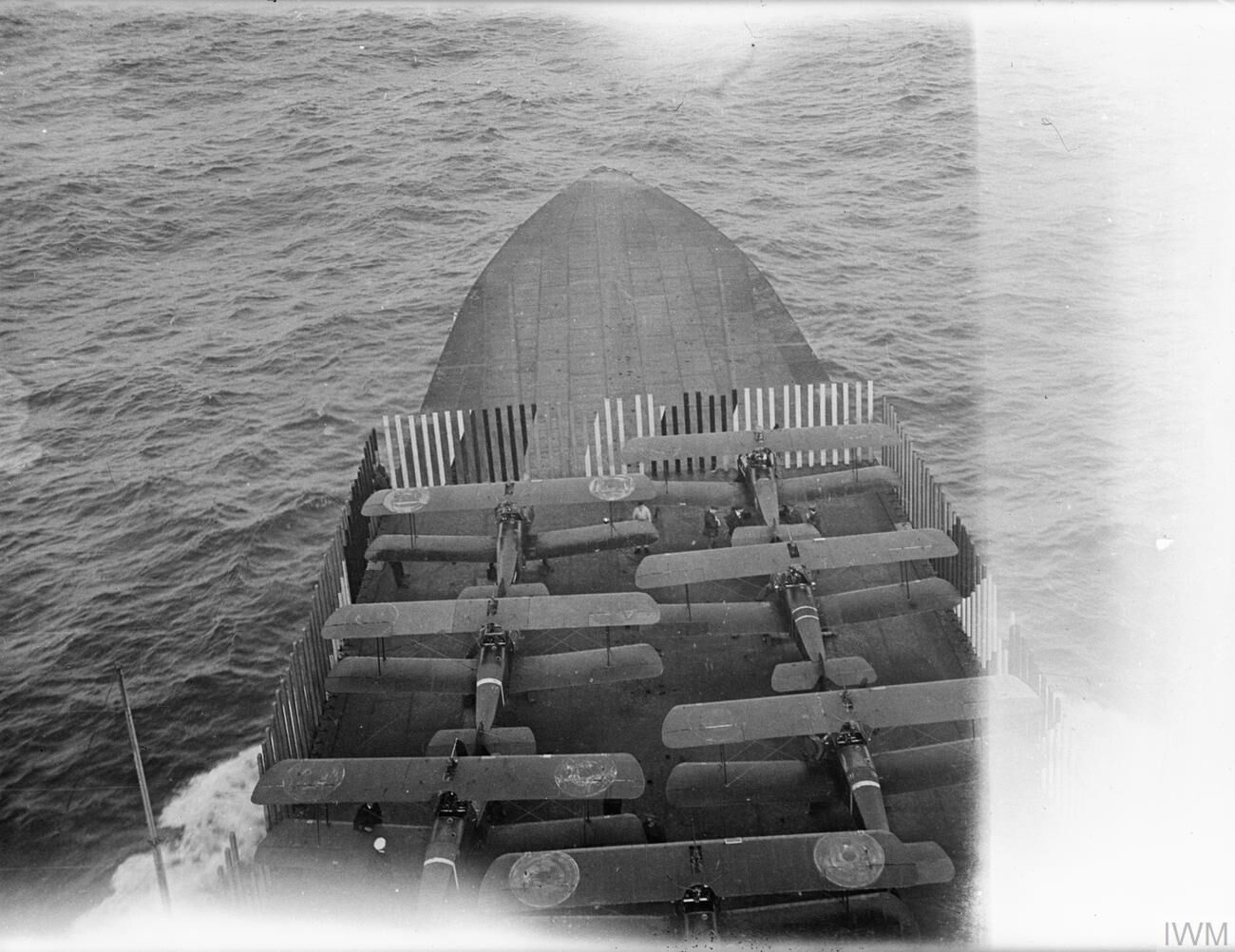
Camels on the foredeck of HMS Furious prior to the Tondern raid.

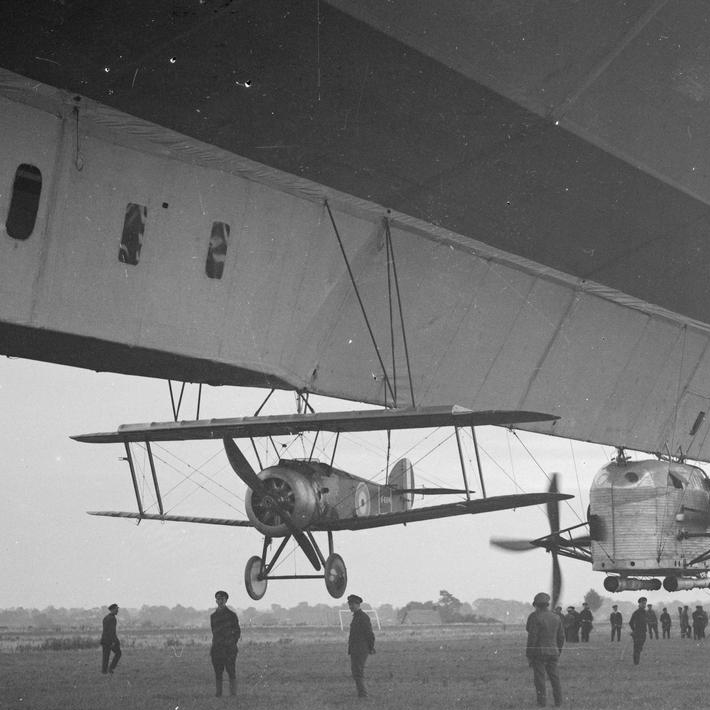
Sopwith 2F.1 Camel suspended from airship R 23 prior to a test flight.

The RNAS operated a number of 2F.1 Camels that were suitable for launching from platforms mounted on the turrets of major warships as well as from some of the earliest aircraft carriers to be built, HMS Furious for example. In the Tondern raid on 19 July 1918, seven Camels armed with bombs flew from Furious to attack the airship base at Tønder, resulting in the destruction of Zeppelin L 54 and L 60, the most successful aircraft carrier operation of the conflict.

The Camel could also be deployed from "aircraft lighters", which were specially modified barges; these had to be towed fast enough that a Camel could successfully take off. The aircraft lighters served as means of launching interception sorties against incoming enemy air raids from a more advantageous position than had been possible when using shore bases alone. However, the only success of this technique was on 11 August 1918, when a Camel launched from a lighter towed by a destroyer shot down Zeppelin L 53.

During the summer of 1918, a single 2F.1 Camel (N6814) participated in a series of trials as a parasite fighter. The aircraft used Airship R23 as a mothership.

=== Ground attack ===
By mid-1918, the Camel had become obsolescent as a day fighter as its climb rate, level speed and performance at altitudes over 12,000 ft (3,650 m) were outclassed by the latest German fighters, such as the Fokker D.VII. However, it remained viable as a ground-attack and infantry support aircraft and instead was increasingly used in that capacity. The Camel inflicted high losses on German ground forces, albeit suffering from a high rate of losses itself in turn, through the dropping of 25 lb (11 kg) Cooper bombs and low-level strafing runs. The protracted development of the Camel's replacement, the Sopwith Snipe, resulted in the Camel remaining in service in this capacity until well after the signing of the Armistice.

During the German spring offensive of March 1918, squadrons of Camels participated in the defence of the Allied lines, harassing the advancing German Army from the skies. Jackson observed that "some of the most intense air operations took place" during the retreat of the British Fifth Army, in which the Camel provided extensive aerial support. Camels flew at multiple altitudes, some as low as 500 feet (150 m) for surprise strafing attacks upon ground forces, while being covered from attack by hostile fighters by the higher altitude aircraft. Strafing attacks formed a major component of British efforts to contain the offensive, the attacks often having the result of producing confusion and panic amongst the advancing German forces. As the March offensive waned, the Camel was able to operate within and maintain aerial superiority for the remainder of the war.

=== Postwar service ===
In the aftermath of the First World War, the Camel saw further combat action. Multiple British squadrons were deployed into Russia as a part of the Allied intervention in the Russian Civil War. Between the Camel and the S.E.5, which were the two main types deployed to the Caspian Sea area to bomb Bolshevik bases and to provide aerial support to the Royal Navy warships present, Allied control of the Caspian region had been achieved by May 1919. Starting in March 1919, direct support was also provided for White Russian forces, carrying out reconnaissance, ground attack, and escort operations. During the summer of 1919, Camels of No. 47 Squadron conducted offensive operations in the vicinity of Tsaritsyn, primarily against Urbabk airfield; targets including enemy aircraft, cavalry formations, and river traffic. In September 1919, 47 Squadron was relocated to Kotluban, where its aircraft operations mainly focused on harassing enemy communication lines. During late 1919 and early 1920, the RAF detachment operated in support of General Vladimir May-Mayevsky's counter-revolutionary volunteer army during intense fighting around Kharkiv. In March 1920, the remainder of the force was evacuated and their remaining aircraft were deliberately destroyed to avoid them falling into enemy hands.

== Variants ==
Camels were powered by several makes of rotary engines:

- Bentley BR1, 150 hp (standard for RNAS aircraft)
- Clerget 9B, 130 hp (standard powerplant)
- Clerget 9Bf, 140 hp
- Le Rhône 9J, 110 hp
- Gnome Monosoupape 9B-2, 100 hp
- Gnome Monosoupape 9N, 160 hp

=== Sopwith Camel F.1 ===
The F.1 was the main production version. It was armed with twin synchronised Vickers guns.

=== Sopwith Camel 2F.1 ===
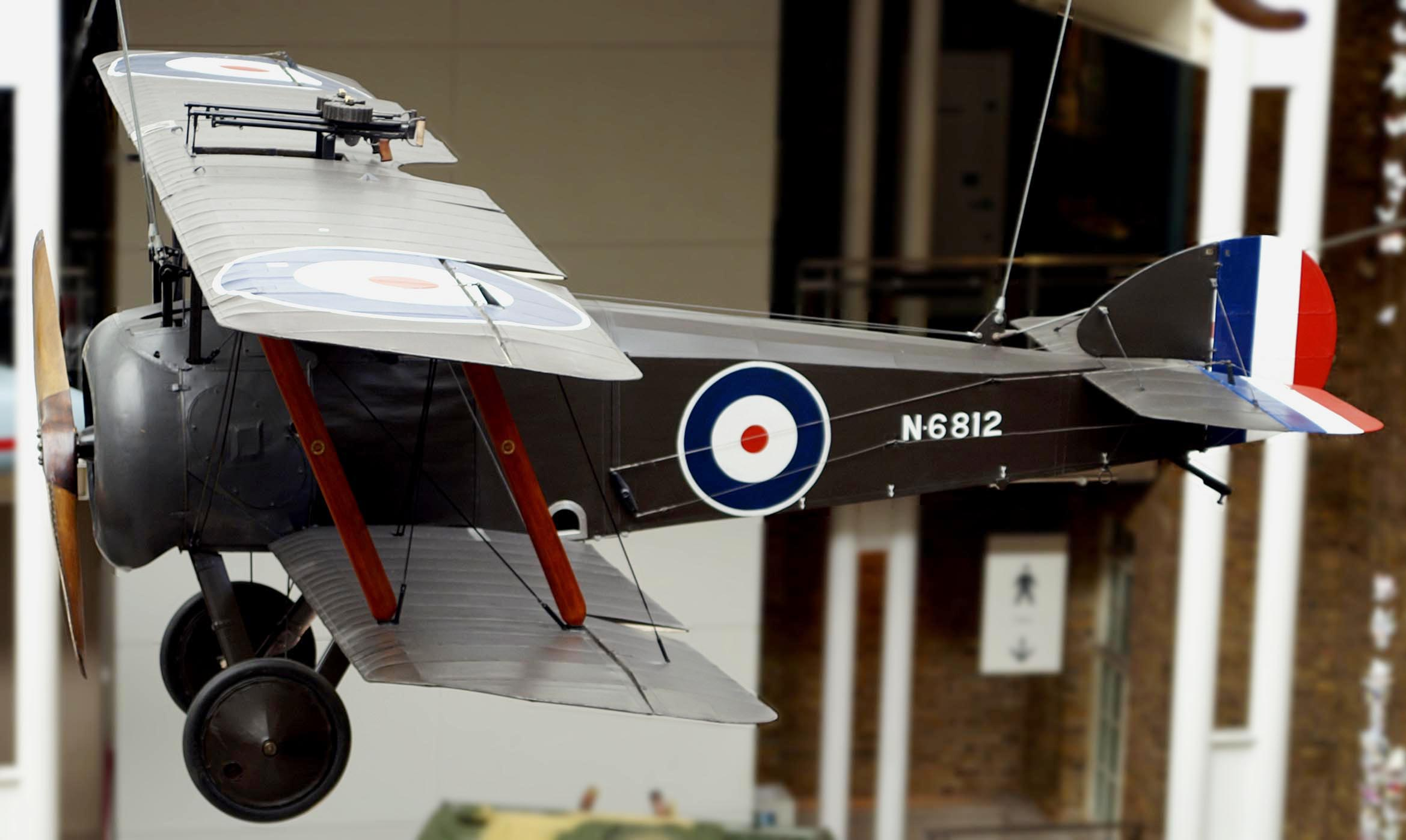
The Sopwith 2F.1 Camel used to shoot down Zeppelin L 53, at the Imperial War Museum, London. Note mounting of twin Lewis guns over the top wing

The 2F.1 was a shipboard variant, flown from HMS Furious. It had a slightly shorter wingspan and a Bentley BR1 as its standard engine. Additionally, one Vickers gun was replaced by an overwing Lewis gun to assist in destroying Zeppelins using incendiary ammunition.

=== Sopwith Camel "Comic" Night fighter ===
The "Comic" was a Camel variant designed specifically for night-fighting duties. The twin Vickers guns were replaced by two Lewis guns on Foster mountings firing forward over the top wing, as the muzzle flash of the Vickers guns could blind the pilot. The second reason to use Lewis guns was to facilitate the use of incendiary ammunition because of the risk of using it in synchronized guns. To allow reloading of the guns, the pilot was moved about 12 inches (30 cm) to the rear, and to compensate the fuel tank was moved forward. It served with Home Defence Squadrons against German air raids. The "Comic" nickname was unofficial, and was shared with the night fighter version of the Sopwith 1½ Strutter.

=== F.1/1 ===
The F1/1 was a version with tapered wings.

=== T.F.1 ===
The T.F.1 was an experimental trench fighter used for development work for the Sopwith Salamander. Its machine guns were angled downwards for efficient strafing, and it featured armour plating for protection.

=== Trainer ===
The trainer variant had a second cockpit behind the normal pilot's position. The weapons were removed, although the hump was sometimes kept.

== Operators ==
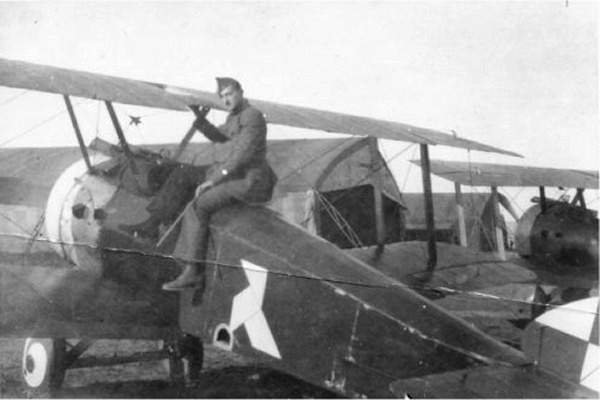
Belgian Sopwith Camel flown by Adj. Léon Cremers with n° 11 Squadron "Cocotte" marking

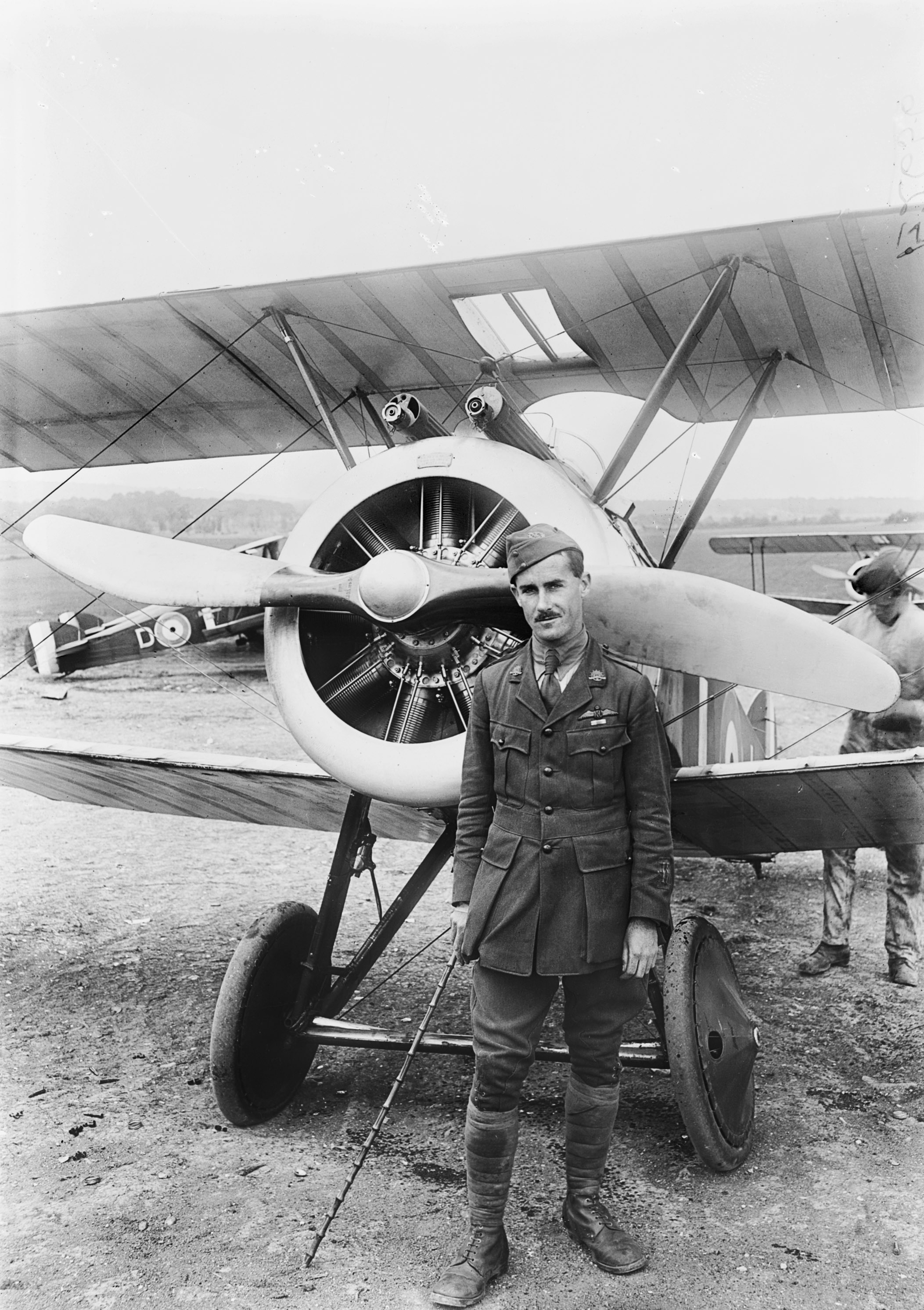
Major Wilfred Ashton McCloughry MC, the commanding officer of No. 4 Squadron AFC, and his Sopwith Camel, 6 June 1918

Australia

- Australian Flying Corps
  - No. 4 Squadron AFC in France.
  - No. 5 Squadron AFC in the United Kingdom.
  - No. 6 (Training) Squadron AFC in the United Kingdom.
  - No. 8 (Training) Squadron AFC in the United Kingdom.

Belgium

- Aviation Militaire Belge
  - 1ère Escadrille de Chasse
- Groupe de Chasse
  - 9ème Escadrille de Chasse
  - 11ème Escadrille de Chasse

Canada

- Royal Canadian Air Force

Estonia

- Estonian Air Force

France

- French Government

- Georgian Air Force – 3-4 aircraft, 1920

Greece

- Hellenic Navy

Latvia

- Latvian Air Force

Netherlands

- Royal Netherlands Air Force

Poland

- Polish Air Force operated 1 Camel post-war (1921)

Russian Empire

- Imperial Russian Air Service

Soviet Union

- Soviet Air Force – Postwar.

United Kingdom

- Royal Flying Corps / Royal Air Force

- 3 Squadron
- 17 Squadron
- 28 Squadron
- 37 Squadron
- 43 Squadron
- 44 Squadron
- 45 Squadron
- 46 Squadron
- 47 Squadron
- 50 Squadron
- 51 Squadron
- 54 Squadron
- 61 Squadron

- 65 Squadron
- 66 Squadron
- 70 Squadron
- 71 Squadron
- 73 Squadron
- 75 Squadron
- 78 Squadron
- 80 Squadron
- 81 Squadron
- 89 Squadron
- 94 Squadron
- 112 Squadron
- 139 Squadron
- 143 Squadron
- 150 Squadron
- 151 Squadron
- 152 Squadron
- 155 Squadron
- 187 Squadron
- 188 Squadron
- 189 Squadron
- 198 Squadron
- 201 Squadron
- 203 Squadron
- 204 Squadron
- 208 Squadron
- 209 Squadron
- 210 Squadron
- 212 Squadron
- 213 Squadron
- 219 Squadron
- 220 Squadron
- 222 Squadron
- 225 Squadron
- 230 Squadron
- 233 Squadron
- 273 Squadron

- Royal Naval Air Service
  - No. 1 Squadron RNAS
  - No. 3 Squadron RNAS
  - No. 4 Squadron RNAS
  - No. 6 Squadron RNAS
  - No. 8 Squadron RNAS
  - No. 9 Squadron RNAS
  - No. 10 Squadron RNAS
  - No. 12 Squadron RNAS
  - No. 13 Squadron RNAS

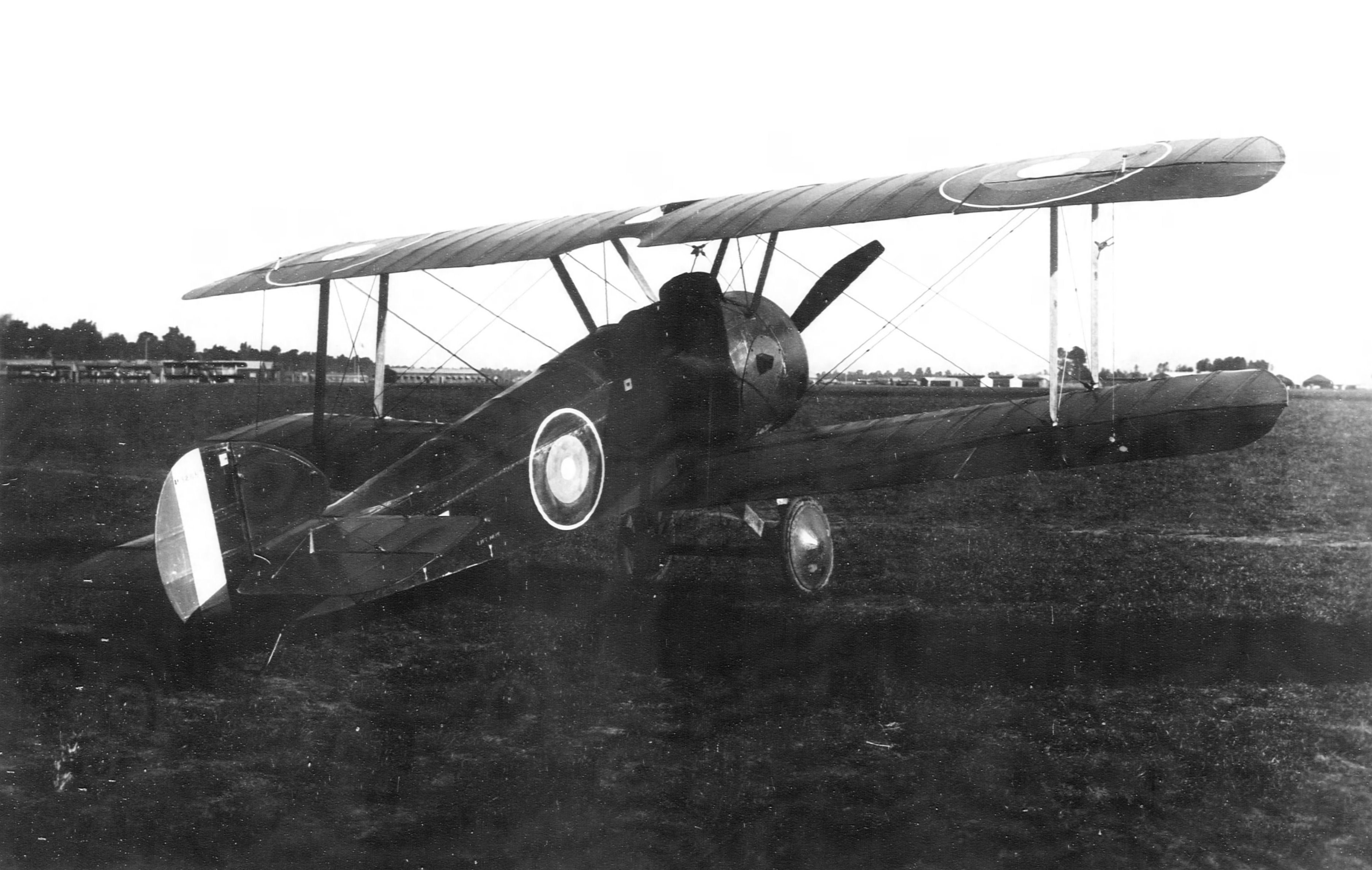
USAS Sopwith Camel

United States

- American Expeditionary Force
- United States Army Air Service
  - 9th Aero Squadron
  - 17th Aero Squadron
  - 27th Aero Squadron
  - 37th Aero Squadron
  - 148th Aero Squadron
- United States Navy

== Surviving aircraft ==
Media related to Sopwith Camel museum aircraft at Wikimedia Commons

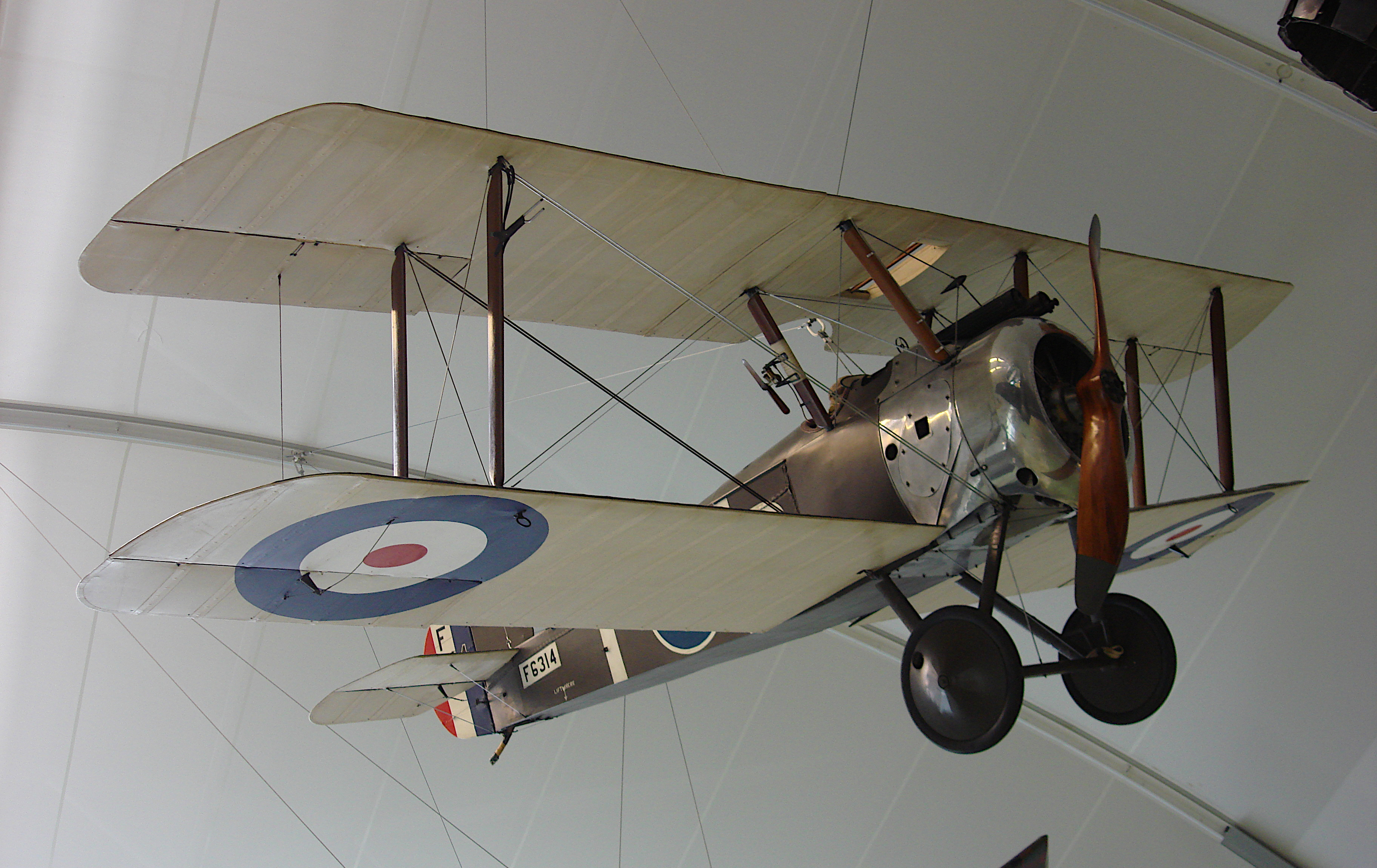
Sopwith Camel at the Royal Air Force Museum

There are eight known original Sopwith Camels extant:

- B5747 – F.1 on static display at the Royal Museum of the Armed Forces and Military History in Brussels.
- B6291 – F.1 on display at the National Air and Space Museum, Washington, D.C. After being discovered in the 1960s by Desmond St. Cyrien, the aircraft was restored through the 1980s, with the restoration being completed by Tony Ditheridge at AJD Engineering in the United Kingdom, first flying in 1992. From 2005 the aircraft was part of the Javier Arango Collection in Paso Robles, California and was donated to the NASM on Arango's death in April 2017. From 2017 to 2024, the aircraft was displayed at the Steven F. Udvar-Hazy Center in Chantilly, Virginia.
- B7280 – F.1 on static display at the Polish Aviation Museum in Kraków, Lesser Poland. The aircraft was built in Lincoln by Clayton & Shuttleworth. On 5 September 1918, when being flown by Captain Herbert A. Patey of No. 210 Squadron RAF over Belgium, it was shot down by Ludwig Beckmann of Jasta 56. Patey survived and was taken prisoner. The Germans repaired the aircraft and flew it until the end of the war. It was then taken to Berlin and exhibited at the Deutsche Luftfahrt Sammlung (German Aviation Collection). During World War II it was moved to Poland for safekeeping, and put into storage. Restoration began in 2007 and was completed by 2010.
- C8228 – F.1 on static display at the National Naval Aviation Museum in Pensacola, Florida.
- F6314 – F.1 on static display at the Royal Air Force Museum London in London. It was built by Boulton & Paul and is painted to represent an aircraft coded B of No. 65 Squadron RAF.
- N6812 – 2F.1 on static display at the Imperial War Museum in London. It was built by William Beardmore and was flown by Flight Sub-Lieutenant Stuart Culley on 11 August 1918 when he shot down Zeppelin LZ 100.
- N8156 – 2F.1 on static display at the Canada Aviation and Space Museum in Ottawa, Ontario. Manufactured in 1918 by Hooper and Company Limited, it was purchased by the RCAF in 1925 and last flew in 1967.
- ZK-SDL – F.1 airworthy in New Zealand with The Vintage Aviator Ltd (TVAL) and painted as B5663. It was previously displayed in the Aerospace Education Center in Little Rock, Arkansas, until it closed in December 2010, and the aircraft was sold to help pay debts. The Camel was sold to TVAL and restored to flying condition. It was previously registered as N6254.

=== Reproductions ===
Media related to Sopwith Camel replicas at Wikimedia Commons

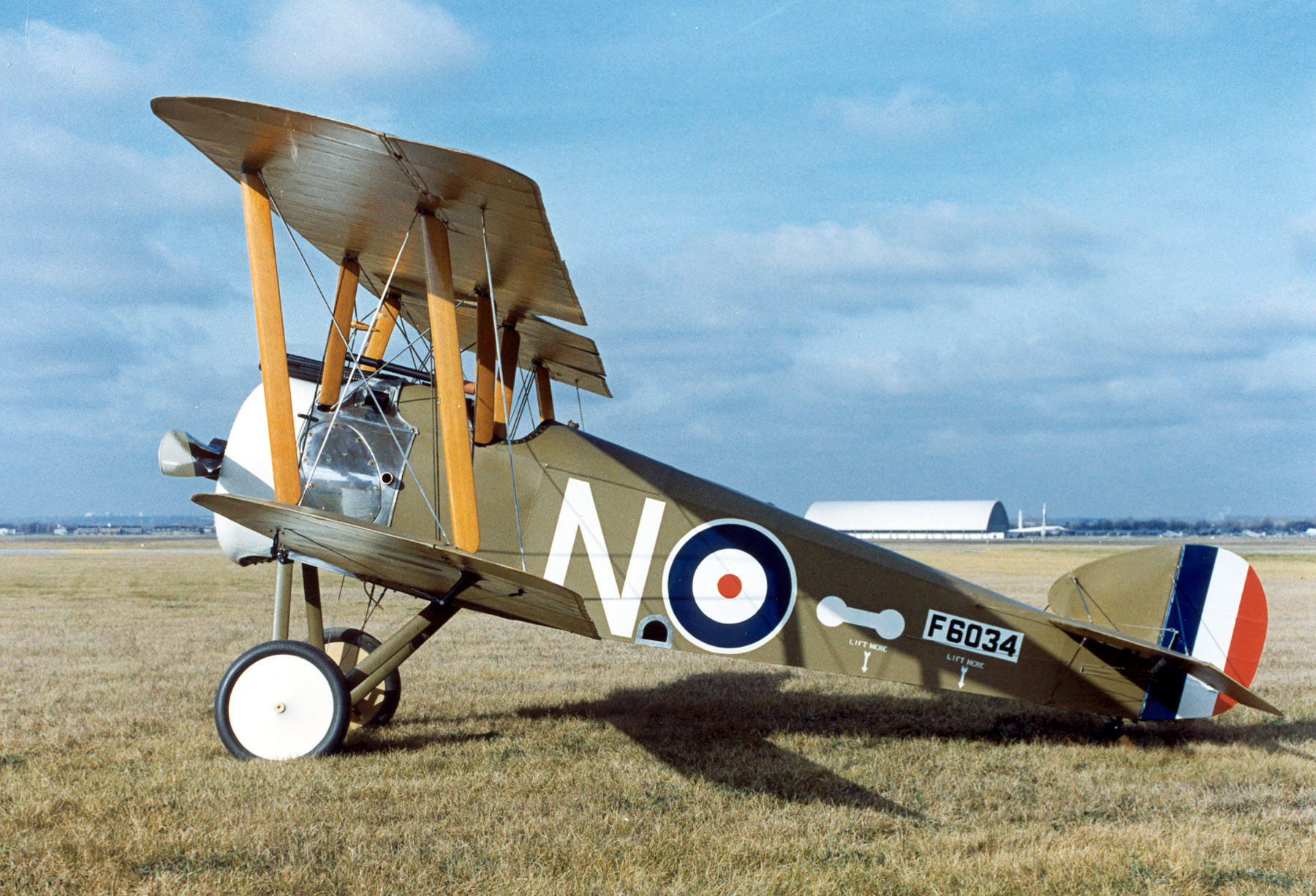
Replica of Camel F.1 flown by Lt. George Vaughn Jr., 17th Aero Squadron at the USAF Museum

- Replica – F.1 airworthy in Oliver BC Canada, operated as C-FGHT by the Royal Flying Corps School of Aerial Fighting Ltd. Built from Replicraft plans by Rolland Carlson in Wi.Powered by a Warner Super Scarab 165 hp engine.
- Replica – Type T.57 on static display at the Fleet Air Arm Museum at RNAS Yeovilton near Yeovil, Somerset. It was built in 1969 Slingsby for use in a Biggles film. It has a Warner Scarab engine installed and is painted as B6401.
- Replica – F.1 on static display at the National Museum of the United States Air Force in Dayton, Ohio. This aircraft was built by museum personnel from original First World War factory drawings and was completed in 1974. It is painted and marked as the Camel flown by Lt. George A. Vaughn Jr. while flying with the 17th Aero Squadron.
- Replica – F.1 airworthy at the Cavanaugh Flight Museum, formerly in Addison, Texas. It was built by Dick Day from original factory drawings. The aircraft is fitted with original instruments, machine guns and an original Gnome rotary engine. It is painted in the scheme of the World War I flying ace Captain Arthur Roy Brown (RAF officer), a Canadian who flew with the Royal Air Force. The museum closed indefinitely on 1 January 2024 and announced that its aircraft would be relocated to North Texas Regional Airport in Denison, Texas.
- Replica – F.1 on display at the Brooklands Museum in Weybridge, Surrey. It was built in 1977 by Viv Bellamy at Lands End, as a flyable reproduction for Leisure Sport Ltd. Painted to represent B7270 of 209 Squadron, RAF, the machine which Captain Roy Brown flew when officially credited with shooting down Baron Manfred von Richthofen, it has a Clerget rotary engine of 1916 and was registered as G-BFCZ until 2003. First displayed at the museum in January 1988 for Sir Thomas Sopwith's 100th birthday celebrations, it was purchased by the museum later that year.
- Replica – B6299 at the Old Rhinebeck Aerodrome in Red Hook, New York. It was completed in 1992 with a 160 hp Gnome Monosoupape model 9N rotary, built by Nathaniel deFlavia and Cole Palen. It replaced one of the Dick Day-built and -flown Camel reproductions formerly flown at Old Rhinebeck by Mr. Day in their weekend vintage airshows, which had left the Aerodrome's collection some years earlier.
- Replica – F.1 airworthy with the Javier Arango Collection in Paso Robles, California. It was constructed by Dick Day, is powered by a 160 hp Gnome Monosoupape 9N rotary, and is registered as N8343.
- Replica – Unknown airworthy with the Vintage Aviator Collection in Masterton, New Zealand. It was originally built by Carl Swanson for Gerry Thornhill. It is powered by a 160 hp Gnome Monosoupape rotary engine and is painted as B3889.
- Replica – F.1 on static display at the Canadian Museum of Flight in Langley, British Columbia. Lacking an engine, a full reproduction 130 hp rotary engine has been installed.
- Replica – F.1 on static display at the Aviation Heritage Museum in Bull Creek, Western Australia. The engine is original and the propeller is suspected to also be genuine.
- Replica – F.1 airworthy at the Shuttleworth Collection in Old Warden, Bedfordshire. It was built by the Northern Aeroplane Workshops.
- Replica – F.1 under construction by Koz Aero in Comstock Park, Michigan. It is based on original factory drawings and using many original parts, including an original engine and instruments.
- Replica – F.1 under construction by John S. Shaw. It has an original Clerget 9B 130 CV engine.
- Replica – F.1 under construction by John S. Shaw. It has a new build Gnome Monosoupape 9B-2 100 hp engine.
- Replica – F.1 on static display at Montrose Air Station Museum in Montrose, Angus. It is painted and marked as B7320 flown by Captain John Todd of 70 Squadron Royal Flying Corps.
- Replica – F.1 on static display at The Museum of Flight near Seattle, Washington.
- Assumed replica – on static display at the Australian Army Flying Museum at Oakey, Queensland. https://www.armyflyingmuseum.com.au/

== Specifications (F.1 Camel) ==
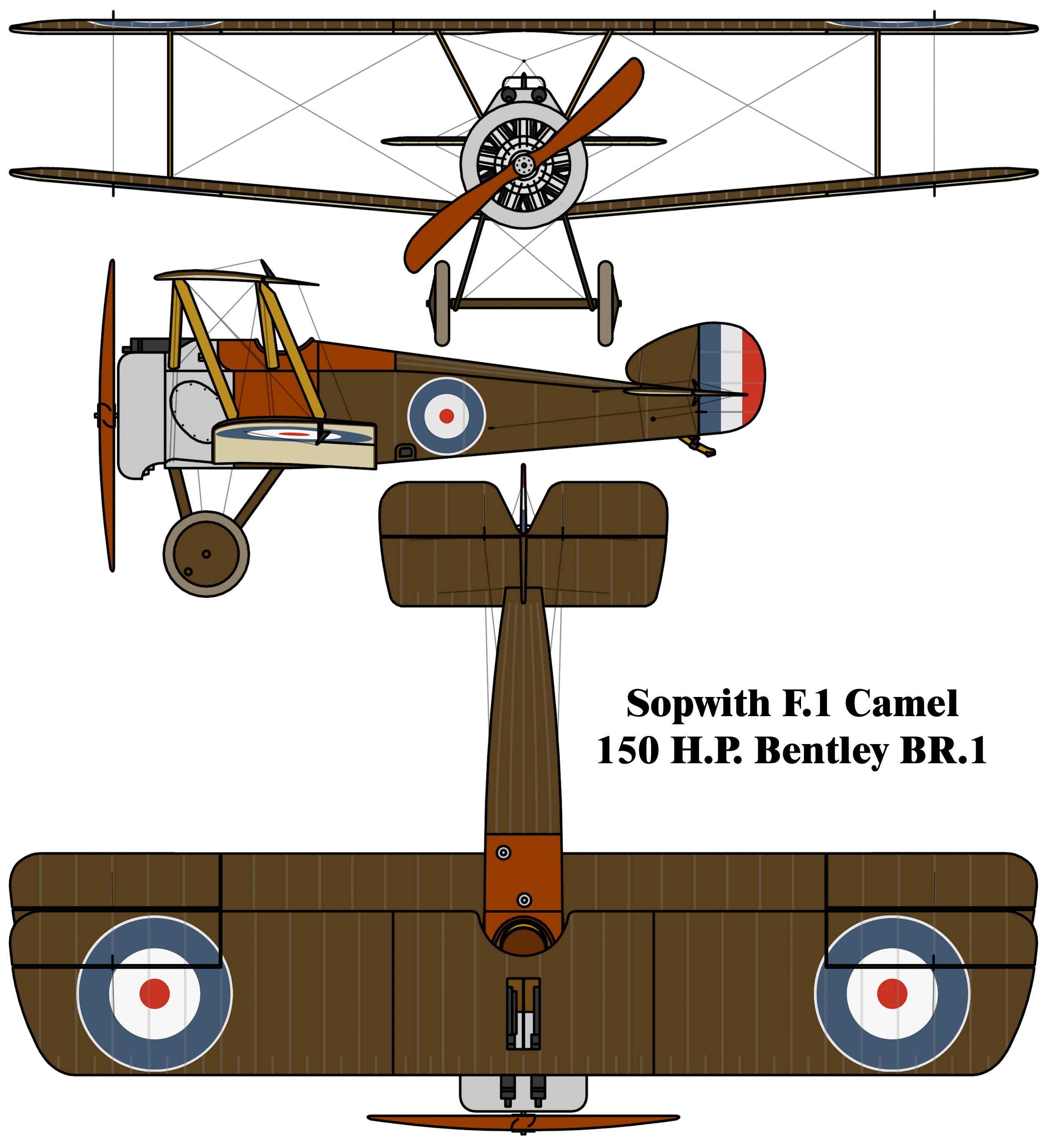
Sopwith F.1 Camel drawing

Data from Quest for Performance, Profile Publications

General characteristics

- Crew: 1
- Length: 18 ft 9 in (5.72 m)
- Wingspan: 28 ft 0 in (8.53 m)
- Height: 8 ft 6 in (2.59 m)
- Wing area: 231 sq ft (21.5 m^{2})
- Aspect ratio: 4.11
- Airfoil: RAF 16
- Empty weight: 930 lb (422 kg)
- Gross weight: 1,453 lb (659 kg)
- Zero-lift drag coefficient: C_{D}0.0378
- Frontal area: 8.73 square feet (0.811 m^{2})
- Powerplant: 1 × Clerget 9B 9-cylinder air-cooled rotary piston engine, 130 hp (97 kW)
- Propellers: 2-bladed fixed-pitch wooden propeller

Performance

- Maximum speed: 113 mph (182 km/h, 98 kn)
- Stall speed: 48 mph (77 km/h, 42 kn)
- Range: 300 mi (480 km, 260 nmi)
- Service ceiling: 19,000 ft (5,800 m)
- Rate of climb: 1,085 ft/min (5.51 m/s)
- Lift-to-drag: 7.7
- Wing loading: 6.3 lb/sq ft (31 kg/m^{2})
- Power/mass: 0.09 hp/lb (0.15 kW/kg)

Armament

- Guns: 2 × 0.303 in (7.70 mm) Vickers machine guns

== Notable appearances in media ==
Biggles flies a Sopwith Camel in the novels by W. E. Johns during Biggles's spell in 266 Squadron during the First World War. The first collection of Biggles stories, titled The Camels are Coming, was published in 1932. The first two collections of stories (broken into three books in Australia) were all true stories or events, lightly fictionalised—some of them are identifiable in official war records, e.g., the accidental discovery of a major camouflaged airfield when rescuing a downed pilot.

The Sopwith Camel was featured as a flyable aircraft in the Microsoft Flight Simulator series, starting with Microsoft Flight Simulator 1.0, released in November 1982. Microsoft Flight Simulator 2002 was the last version to include the Sopwith Camel with the game.

The Camel is the "plane" of Snoopy in the Peanuts comic strip, when he imagines himself as a World War I flying ace and the nemesis of the Red Baron.

== See also ==
Aircraft of comparable role, configuration, and era

- Albatros D.V
- Fokker Dr.I
- Fokker D.VI
- Fokker D.VII
- Hanriot HD.1
- Nieuport 24
- Royal Aircraft Factory S.E.5
- SPAD S.XIII
- Vickers F.B.19

Related lists

- List of aircraft of the Royal Air Force
- List of aircraft of the Royal Flying Corps
- List of aircraft of the Royal Naval Air Service
- List of fighter aircraft
