= Franz Schleiff =

- Born: 19 September 1896; Alt Christburg, West Prussia
- Died: unknown
- Military career
- Allegiance: Germany
- Branch: Aviation
- Rank: Oberleutnant
- Units: Fliegerersatz-Abteilung 9, Flieger-Abteilung 54, Flieger-Abteilung 300, Jagdstaffel 41
- Commands: Jagdstaffel 56
- Awards: Royal House Order of Hohenzollern, Iron Cross, Turkish Silver Imtiaz Medal and Silver Liakat Medal

Oberleutnant Franz Schleiff (born 19 September 1896, date of death unknown) was a World War I flying ace credited with twelve aerial victories. Nine additional combat claims went uncredited.

== Aerial service ==
=== Russia and Palestine ===
Schlieff joined German aviation in July 1915. After training at FEA 9 in Darmstadt, he was assigned to FA 54, an artillery cooperation unit operating on the Eastern Front. From there, he was transferred to FA 300 in Palestine. On 11 May 1917, he shot down a Martinsyde Elephant over Beersheba. He scored again, on 25 June, but failed to get confirmation when he forced an enemy fighter to land on the 29th. For his efforts, Schlieff was decorated by the Turkish government.

=== France ===
His next move took him to the Western Front, to Jagdstaffel 41, in October 1917. He scored once for them, on 6 December 1917. On 9 January 1918, he was promoted to command of Jagdstaffel 56. Beginning 19 February, and running through 24 March, he tallied nine more confirmed victories, and an unconfirmed one. On 26 March, he received the Royal House Order of Hohenzollern. On 27 March, he was wounded in the hand by a tracer bullet, and the hand had to be amputated. This ended Schlieff's flying career.

Schlieff claimed 12 victories and was nominated for the Pour le Merite, but did not receive it.
