= Ludwig Beckmann =

German fighter ace and Knight's Cross recipient

Ludwig "Lutz" Beckmann
- Born: 26 October 1895
- Died: 20 January 1965 (aged 69)
- Military career
- Allegiance: German Empire; Nazi Germany
- Branch: Prussian Army; Luftstreitkräfte; Luftwaffe
- Service years: 1914–18; 1930's–1945
- Rank: Oberst
- Nickname: Lutz
- Unit: Jasta 6
- Commands: Kampfgruppe z.b.V. 500
- Conflicts: World War I World War II
- Awards: Knight's Cross of the Iron Cross

Ludwig "Lutz" Beckmann (26 October 1895 – 20 January 1965) was a German Luftstreitkräfte ace during World War I and a recipient of the Knight's Cross of the Iron Cross during World War II. Ludwig Beckmann claimed eight aerial victories during World War I all on the Western Front.

Beckmann joined Jagdstaffel 6 in December 1917. On 21 February 1918, he transferred to Jagdstaffel 48. He transferred once again, to Jagdstaffel 56, on 11 March 1918. Two days later, he scored his first aerial victory. He would score eight confirmed victories before war's end.

Beckmann commanded a special transport unit, IV/TG1, during World War II. He flew over 200 air bridge sorties into besieged Demjansk, Russia with this unit. He also commanded a Junkers Ju 52 unit, KGr zbV 500.

== Awards ==
- German Cross in Gold on 16 July 1942 as Oberstleutnant in Kampfgruppe z.b.V. 500
- Ehrenpokal der Luftwaffe on 19 October 1942 as Oberstleutnant and Gruppenkommandeur
- Knight's Cross of the Iron Cross on 14 March 1943 as Oberstleutnant and commander of Kampfgruppe z.b.V. 500

== Bibliography ==
- Franks, Norman; Bailey, Frank W.; Guest, Russell. Above the Lines: The Aces and Fighter Units of the German Air Service, Naval Air Service and Flanders Marine Corps, 1914–1918. Grub Street, 1993. ISBN 0-948817-73-9, ISBN 978-0-948817-73-1.
- Patzwall, Klaus D.; Scherzer, Veit (2001). Das Deutsche Kreuz 1941 – 1945 Geschichte und Inhaber Band II [The German Cross 1941 – 1945 History and Recipients Volume 2] (in German). Norderstedt, Germany: Verlag Klaus D. Patzwall. ISBN 978-3-931533-45-8.
- Patzwall, Klaus D. (2008). Der Ehrenpokal für besondere Leistung im Luftkrieg [The Honor Goblet for Outstanding Achievement in the Air War] (in German). Norderstedt, Germany: Verlag Klaus D. Patzwall. ISBN 978-3-931533-08-3.
- Scherzer, Veit (2007). Die Ritterkreuzträger 1939–1945 Die Inhaber des Ritterkreuzes des Eisernen Kreuzes 1939 von Heer, Luftwaffe, Kriegsmarine, Waffen-SS, Volkssturm sowie mit Deutschland verbündeter Streitkräfte nach den Unterlagen des Bundesarchives [The Knight's Cross Bearers 1939–1945 The Holders of the Knight's Cross of the Iron Cross 1939 by Army, Air Force, Navy, Waffen-SS, Volkssturm and Allied Forces with Germany According to the Documents of the Federal Archives] (in German). Jena, Germany: Scherzers Militaer-Verlag. ISBN 978-3-938845-17-2.
