= Dieter Collin =

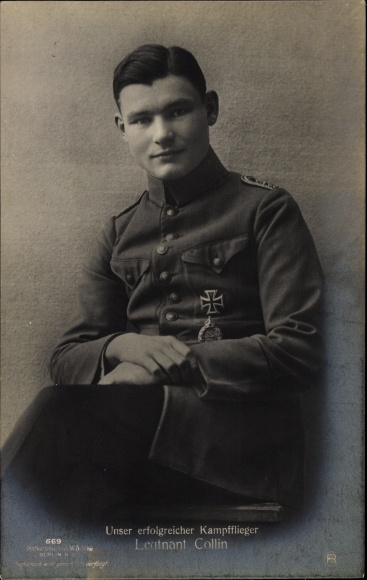
- Born: 17 February 1893; Lüben, Province of Silesia, Germany (present day Poland)
- Died: 13 August 1918 (aged 25)
- Military career
- Allegiance: German Empire
- Branch: Imperial German Air Service
- Rank: Leutnant
- Units: Jagdstaffel 22; Jagdstaffel 2
- Commands: Jagdstaffel 56
- Conflicts: World War I
- Awards: Iron Cross

Lieutenant Dieter Collin (17 February 1893—13 August 1918) IC was a World War I German flying ace credited with 13 aerial victories.

== Early life ==
Dieter Collin was born in Luben, Germany on 17 February 1893.

== Military service ==
Collin was originally assigned to Jagdstaffel 22 in November 1916, but was quickly reassigned to Jagdstaffel 2. He scored his first victory there, on 23 November 1916. He picked up his second the day after Christmas. On 21 February 1917, he returned to Jasta 22. He accumulated another three victories with them, from 23 May 1917 through 6 September 1917, but was wounded on the latter day. He did not return from convalescence until 4 March 1918. On the 29th, he scored his last victory for Jasta 22. On 16 April, he was appointed to command of Jagdstaffel 56. Leading from the front, Collin scored four more victories in May and three in July.

Collin was severely wounded in combat with Sopwith Camels of No. 204 Squadron RAF on 13 August 1918, and died in hospital later that day.
