= Jagdstaffel 56 =

Jasta 56
- Active: 1918
- Country: Kingdom of Prussia, German Empire
- Branch: Luftstreitkräfte
- Type: Fighter squadron
- Engagements: World War I

Royal Prussian Jagdstaffel 56, commonly abbreviated to Jasta 56, was a "hunting group" (i.e., fighter squadron) of the Luftstreitkräfte, the air arm of the Imperial German Army during World War I. The squadron would score 63 aerial victories during the war. The unit's victories came at the expense of seven killed in action, four wounded in action, two injured in accidents, and one taken prisoner of war.

== History ==
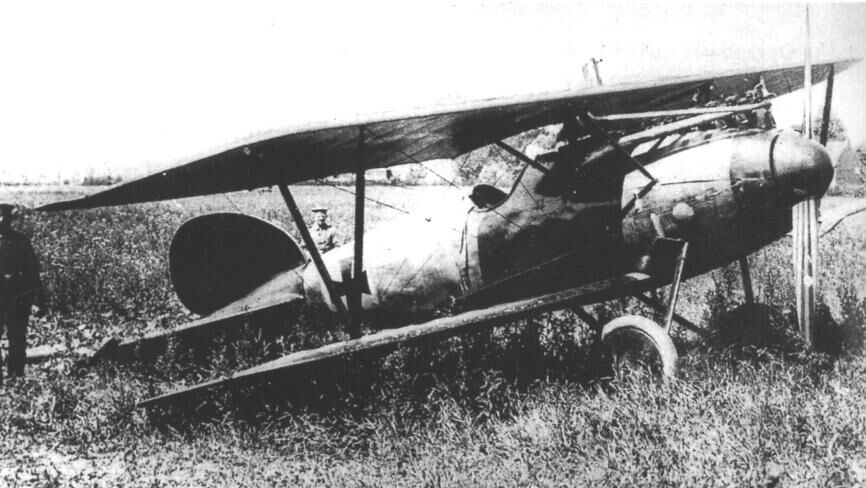
An Albatros D.V (serial unknown). The D.V was the original equipment for Jasta 56.

Jasta 56 began at Paderborn's Geschwader School on 20 October 1917, but was not officially established until 1 January 1918. Its first personnel reported in on 9 January 1918. It was assigned to 2 Armee on the 14th; it first saw combat on 9 February 1918. The new squadron scored first blood on the 19th. On 11 April 1918, it was consolidated into Jagdgruppe 6 and moved to support 4 Armee, remaining in that posting until war's end.

== Commanding officers (Staffelführer) ==
- Franz Schleiff: 9 January 1918 – 27 March 1918 (WIA)
- Dieter Collin: 4 April 1918 – 13 August 1918 (KIA)
- Ludwig Beckmann: 13 August 1918 – war's end

== Duty stations ==
- Neuvilly, France: 14 January 1918
- Mons-en-Chausee: 26 March 1918
- Ingelmunster, Belgium: 11 April 1918
- Rumbeke East, Belgium: 5 May 1918
- Croulshouten: 30 September 1918

== Notable personnel ==
- Franz Schlieff
- Dieter Collin
- Ludwig Beckmann
- Franz Piechulek

== Aircraft ==
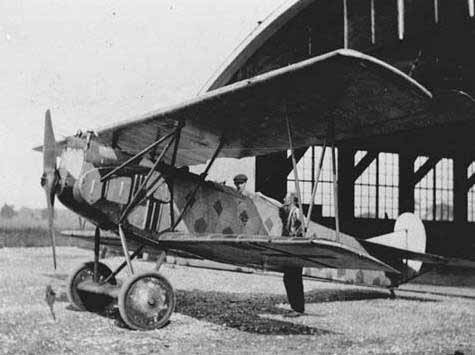
A Fokker D VII (not in Jasta 56 livery.

Flying Albatros D.Va fighters from January 1918, the Jasta was re-fitted with Fokker D.VIIs during May 1918. The unit's marking for aircraft featured yellow nose and vertical stabilizer, white rudder, with a blue fuselage.
