= List of World War I aces credited with 10 victories =

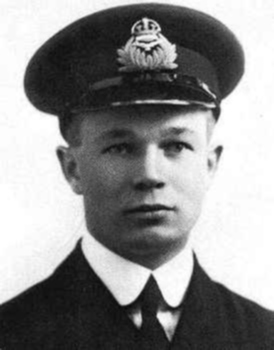
Captain Arthur Roy Brown, credited with victory over the Red Baron, never lost a wingman in combat.

The term ace (now commonly flying ace) was first used by French newspapers during World War I, describing Adolphe Pégoud as l'as ('the ace'), after he downed five German aircraft. When aircraft began to shoot or force down other aircraft, systems to count "air victories" were subsequently developed. The American qualification of five victories eventually became the standard, even though other air services had previously used differing figures.

While "ace" status was most often won by fighter pilots, bomber and reconnaissance crews, and observers in two-seater aircraft such as the Bristol F.2b ("Bristol Fighter"), also destroyed enemy aircraft. If a two-seater aircraft destroyed an aircraft, both crew members were credited with a victory. Because pilots usually teamed with differing observer/gunners in two-seater aircraft, an observer might be an ace when his pilot was not, and vice versa. The few aces among combat aviators have historically accounted for the majority of air-to-air victories in military history.

Loss of records by mischance and the passage of time complicates reconstructing the actual count for given aces. The scores presented in the list cannot be definitive, but are based on itemized lists that are the best available sources of information. Aces are listed after verifying the date and location of combat, and the foe vanquished, for every victory accredited by an aviator's home air service using their own aerial victory standards. Those victories for which the evidence is unavailable or fragmentary have been excluded from the victory count.

== Aces ==
This list is complete. Notable aces are linked to their biographies.

cell coloured along with the symbolic dagger †, indicates that the pilot was known to be either killed in action, missing in action, died of wounds, or killed in a flying accident during World War I.

Name	Country	Air service(s)	Victories
Laurence W. Allen	United Kingdom	Royal Flying Corps, Royal Air Force	10
Edgar O. Amm	South Africa	Royal Flying Corps, Royal Air Force	10
Leopold Anslinger	German Empire	Luftstreitkräfte	10
Gordon Apps	United Kingdom	Royal Flying Corps, Royal Air Force	10
Edward Dawson Atkinson	United Kingdom	Royal Flying Corps, Royal Air Force	10
Paul Aue	German Empire	Luftstreitkräfte	10
Dietrich Averes	German Empire	Luftstreitkräfte	10
Herbert H. Beddow	United Kingdom	Royal Flying Corps, Royal Air Force	10
Hilliard Brooke Bell	Canada	Royal Flying Corps, Royal Air Force	10
Hans Berr†	German Empire	Luftstreitkräfte	10
Robert A. Birkbeck	United Kingdom	Royal Flying Corps, Royal Air Force	10
Maurice Bizot	France	Aéronautique Militaire	10
Franz Brandt	German Empire	Luftstreitkräfte	10
Otto Brauneck†	German Empire	Luftstreitkräfte	10
Lloyd S. Breadner	Canada	Royal Naval Air Service, Royal Air Force, Royal Canadian Air Force	10
Arthur Roy Brown	Canada	Royal Naval Air Service, Royal Air Force	10
Frederick Elliott Brown	Canada	Royal Flying Corps, Royal Air Force	10
Sydney Carlin	United Kingdom	Royal Flying Corps, Royal Air Force	10
Robert L. Chidlaw-Roberts	United Kingdom	Royal Flying Corps, Royal Air Force	10
Cecil Clark	United Kingdom	Royal Flying Corps, Royal Air Force	10
Adrian Cole	Australia	Australian Flying Corps, Royal Flying Corps, Royal Air Force, Royal Australian Air Force	10
Valentine Collins†	United Kingdom	Royal Flying Corps, Royal Air Force	10
Jack Armand Cunningham	United Kingdom	Royal Flying Corps, Royal Air Force	10
Douglas Arthur Davies	United Kingdom	Royal Flying Corps, Royal Air Force	10
Edgar G. Davies	United Kingdom	Royal Flying Corps, Royal Air Force	10
Martin Dehmisch†	German Empire	Luftstreitkräfte	10
Pruett Dennett†	United Kingdom	Royal Naval Air Service, Royal Air Force	10
Robert Dodds	Canada	Royal Flying Corps, Royal Air Force	10
Aubrey Ellwood	United Kingdom	Royal Naval Air Service, Royal Air Force	10
William H. Farrow	United Kingdom	Royal Flying Corps, Royal Air Force	10
Karl Gallwitz	German Empire	Luftstreitkräfte	10
Cecil Gardner†	United Kingdom	Royal Flying Corps, Royal Air Force	10
Lucien Gasser	France	Aéronautique Militaire	10
Thomas Gerrard	United Kingdom	Royal Naval Air Service, Royal Air Force	10
Gerald Gibbs	Australia	Royal Flying Corps, Royal Air Force	10
Stanley Goble	Australia	Royal Naval Air Service, Royal Air Force	10
Justus Grassmann	German Empire	Luftstreitkräfte	10
Lloyd Hamilton†	United States	Royal Flying Corps, Royal Air Force, US Army Air Service	10
George Stacey Hodson	United Kingdom	Royal Flying Corps, Royal Air Force	10
Will Hubbard	United Kingdom	Royal Flying Corps, Royal Air Force, Royal Australian Air Force	10
William Edward Jenkins†	United Kingdom	Royal Flying Corps	10
Duerson Knight	United States	US Army Air Service	10
Alfred Michael Koch	Canada	Royal Flying Corps, Royal Air Force	10
Auguste Lahoulle	France	Aéronautique Militaire	10
Patrick Anthony Langan-Byrne†	United Kingdom	Royal Flying Corps	10
Oliver Colin LeBoutillier	United States	Royal Naval Air Service, Royal Air Force	10
Paul Lotz†	German Empire	Luftstreitkräfte	10
John Joseph Malone†	Canada	Royal Naval Air Service	10
Rudolf Matthaei†	German Empire	Luftstreitkräfte	10
Alfred E. McKay†	Canada	Royal Flying Corps	10
Guy Borthwick Moore†	Canada	Royal Flying Corps, Royal Air Force	10
Max Ritter von Mulzer†	German Empire	Luftstreitkräfte	10
Alfons Nagler	German Empire	Luftstreitkräfte	10
Miroslav Navratil alias Friedrich Navratil	Austria-Hungary	Luftfahrtruppen	10
Gordon Olley	United Kingdom	Royal Flying Corps, Royal Air Force	10
John Paynter†	United Kingdom	Royal Naval Air Service, Royal Air Force	10
Jean Andre Pezon	France	Aéronautique Militaire	10
Croye Pithey	South Africa	Royal Flying Corps, Royal Air Force	10
Charles Quette†	France	Aéronautique Militaire	10
Arthur Randall	United Kingdom	Royal Flying Corps, Royal Air Force	10
Harold Redler†	South Africa	Royal Flying Corps, Royal Air Force	10
Harry Robinson	United Kingdom	Royal Flying Corps, Royal Air Force	10
Indra Lal Roy†	India	Royal Flying Corps, Royal Air Force	10
Laurent B. Ruamps	France	Aéronautique Militaire	10
John Rudkin	United Kingdom	Royal Flying Corps, Royal Air Force	10
Reginald H. Rusby	United Kingdom	Royal Flying Corps, Royal Air Force	10
Hans Schuez	German Empire	Luftstreitkräfte	10
Alfred Shepherd†	Australia	Royal Flying Corps	10
Werner Steinhäuser†	German Empire	Luftstreitkräfte	10
Raoul Stojsavljevic	Austria-Hungary	Luftfahrtruppen	10
Jacques Swaab	United States	US Army Air Service	10
Saint Cyprian Tayler†	United Kingdom	Royal Flying Corps, Royal Air Force	10
Frank Harold Taylor	Canada	Royal Flying Corps, Royal Air Force	10
Edmond Thieffry	Belgium	Aviation Militaire Belge	10
Erich Thomas	German Empire	Luftstreitkräfte	10
John Henry Tudhope	South Africa	Royal Flying Corps, Royal Air Force, Royal Canadian Air Force	10
Paul Turck	German Empire	Luftstreitkräfte	10
Stanley Wallage	United Kingdom	Royal Flying Corps, Royal Air Force	10
William Lewis Wells†	United Kingdom	Royal Flying Corps, Royal Air Force	10
Paul Wenzel	German Empire	Luftstreitkräfte	10
Russell Winnicott†	United Kingdom	Royal Flying Corps	10
Hans Wolff†	German Empire	Luftstreitkräfte	10
