= Gutknecht =

Gutknecht is a surname of German origin. Notable people with the surname include:

- Adolf Gutknecht (1891–????), German First World War flying ace
- Christoph Gutknecht (born 1939), former German professor of English studies
- Gil Gutknecht (born 1951), American politician
- Jürg Gutknecht (born 1949), Swiss computer scientist

== See also ==
- Edwin and Jennie Gutknecht House
