= Henry Coyle Rath =

- Born: November 12, 1898; Hastings, Ontario, Canada
- Died: October 26, 1918 (aged 19); Tournai, Belgium
- Burial place: Grave V.C.8, Tournai Communal Cemetery Allied Extension, Tournai, Belgium
- Military career
- Allegiance: George V of the British Empire
- Branch: Royal Flying Corps
- Rank: Lieutenant
- Unit: No. 29 Squadron RAF
- Awards: Distinguished Flying Cross

Lieutenant Henry Coyle Rath DFC was a Canadian World War I flying ace credited with twelve aerial victories.

== Early life ==
Henry Coyle Rath was born on 12 November 1898 to Maggie and Thomas Rath. Henry Rath was born in Hastings, Ontario, Canada. He was working as a hardware clerk in Tweed, Ontario prior to his enlistment in the military.

== Flying service ==
Rath joined the Royal Flying Corps in September 1917. He was assigned to 29 Squadron on 5 June 1918 as a Royal Aircraft Factory SE.5a pilot.

He scored his first victory on 28 July, helping fellow ace Robert Holme drive down a German two-seater reconnaissance plane out of control. Three days later, they again cooperated, destroying a similar plane; Rath also drove down a third recon plane in the same dogfight. After driving down a fourth recce craft on 1 August, Rath became an ace on 8 August. In conjunction with fellow aces Claude Melnot Wilson, Arthur Reed, and a couple of other pilots, Rath destroyed a Hannover reconnaissance craft.

During the remainder of August, he destroyed three more enemy airplanes and drove two down out of control. On 14 October 1918, apparently in the same combat that resulted in Wilson's death, Rath destroyed two Fokker D.VIIs, bringing his tally to seven enemy planes destroyed and five driven down out of battle. On 26 October, Rath collided with another pilot from the same squadron while they were flying at 12,000 feet over Tournai. Both pilots died, though MacLean lingered for a day before succumbing to injuries. Rath was buried in Grave VC.8 in the Tournai cemetery.

== Honours and awards ==
Distinguished Flying Cross (DFC)

Lieut. Henry Coyle Rath. (FRANCE)

Considered a bold and resolute fighter pilot in the air who took out six enemy aeroplanes. On 14 October he, with three other machines, engaged a large number of enemy scouts; five were shot down, with Lieut. Rath destroying two.
