= Robert Holme (aviator) =

Robert Charles Lyon Holme
- Born: 10 November 1896; South London, England
- Died: 4 October 1922 (aged 25); Kirkuk, Iraq
- Burial place: Ma'asker Al Raschid RAF Cemetery, Baghdad, Iraq
- Military career
- Allegiance: United Kingdom
- Branch: British Army; Royal Air Force
- Service years: 1914–1922
- Rank: Flight lieutenant
- Units: Prince Albert's (Somerset Light Infantry); No. 29 Squadron RAF; No. 1 Squadron RAF
- Conflicts: World War I; Western Front
- Awards: Military Cross

Flight Lieutenant Robert Charles Lyon Holme MC (10 November 1896 – 4 October 1922) was a British World War I flying ace credited with five aerial victories.

== Biography ==
Holme was the only son of Robert Francis Lyon Holme, and the grandson of Charles Trask, of Norton-sub-Hamdon, Somerset.

After passing out from the Royal Military College, Sandhurst, as a "Gentlemen Cadet", he was commissioned as a second lieutenant in Prince Albert's (Somerset Light Infantry) regiment on 11 November 1914. Holme was seconded to the Royal Flying Corps, and was awarded Royal Aero Club Aviators' Certificate No. 1665 on 28 August 1915 after qualifying in a Maurice Farman biplane at the British Flying School in Le Crotoy, France. He was appointed a flying officer (observer) on 21 October, and then a flying officer on 13 January 1916.

He was promoted to lieutenant on 1 June 1916, and on 1 July was appointed a flight commander with the acting rank of captain.

On 24 January 1917 Holme was awarded the Military Cross, and in July was listed as being wounded in action.

In 1918 Holme was serving in No. 29 Squadron flying a S.E.5a single-seat fighter. He gained his first aerial victory on 2 July, destroying a Fokker D.VII over Merris. On 14 July he destroyed an observation balloon, and accounted for two more aircraft on 28 and 31 July over Merville and Estaires. His fifth and final victory was on 1 August, driving down out of control a DFW C reconnaissance aircraft over Steenwerk with Lieutenant Henry Coyle Rath.

On 1 August 1919 Holme resigned his commission in the Somerset Light Infantry, having been granted a permanent commission in the Royal Air Force with the rank of captain.

On 4 October 1922 now Flight Lieutenant Holme, while serving in No. 1 Squadron, was killed when the Vickers Vernon of No. 45 Squadron in which he was travelling as a passenger crashed at Kirkuk, Iraq. He is buried in Ma'asker Al Raschid RAF Cemetery, Baghdad.
