= Josef Raesch =

German World War I flying ace

- Born: Josef Karl Ernst Räsch; 4 June 1897; Zewen near Trier, Rhineland, Germany
- Died: 1967 or later
- Military career
- Allegiance: Germany
- Branch: Infantry; aviation (Luftstreitkräfte)
- Service years: 1914 - 1918
- Rank: Leutnant
- Units: Flieger-Abteilung (Flier Detachment) 7, Jagddstaffel (Fighter Squadron) 43
- Awards: Iron Cross both classes

Leutnant Josef Karl Ernst Raesch (4 June 1897 – ?) was a World War I flying ace credited with seven aerial victories. Two of his victories were over other aces, Guy Wareing and Ernest Charles Hoy.

== Biography ==
Josef Raesch was born in Zewen near Trier on 4 June 1897. The start of World War I sparked his enlistment into the German infantry on 4 August 1914. On 1 December 1917, he transferred from this duty to pilot's training at Fliegerersatz-Abteilung (Replacement Detachment) 5.

After training he was assigned to a reconnaissance unit, Flieger-Abteilung (Flier Detachment) 7, as a two-seater pilot. After seasoning there, he attended Jastaschule (Fighter pilot training), with subsequent posting to a fighter squadron. He joined Jagdstaffel 43 on 6 June 1918. In his June diary entries, he mentioned that rookie pilots posted to the squadron were given older Albatros D.IIIs or Albatros D.Vs to fly, but that newer Fokker D.VIIs were filtering into the unit. The eighth D.VII arrival is noted. Raesch inherited Otto Creutzmann's Fokker D.VII when the latter left the Jasta on 13 June. Creutzmann's insignia of a forward-thrusting pitchfork remained on the plane.

For his first aerial victory, Raesch shot down a Royal Aircraft Factory SE.5a north of Hantay at 1100 hours on 27 June 1918. His diary contained a vivid description:

The Englishmen started to circle, and as soon as I had one in my sights I opened up with a volley from both guns, whereupon the SE 5 went into a vertical climb and then slipped off into a spin, with me closely on his tail. I let him have a second burst, and I could see my tracers entering his cockpit and engine and finally had to pull away to avoid a collision. I spotted my victim some 300 meters below me....I dived and again opened up with both guns. The SE 5 went into a climb, and now I could see the machine was on fire. The machine spun towards the earth in a tower of fire and finally crashed.

On 1 July, he scored again, downing a Sopwith Camel. One week later, he shot down another SE.5a over Nieppe Wood for his third confirmed victory.

The Summer weather became so hot that the German phosphorus ammunition for machine guns would sometimes "cook off"; according to Raesch's diary, Jasta 43 lost a pilot to that catastrophe on 16 July. He also noted such ersatz war materials as iron bullets for brass, and wooden landing gear wheels being supplied.

On 25 July, he lost a combat at 1800 hours; Lieutenant Ivan Frank Hind flying SE.5a C5358 shot Raesch down in flames, using Buckingham incendiary ammunition. The bullets narrowly missed Raesch's head, but a burst of flame struck him in the face. Although having had a parachute for only the past fortnight, in one of the pioneering wartime jumps, Raesch baled out and reached ground alive but facially singed. He had to yank his chute from its container in midair to do so. Then a two-meter hole had burned the 'chute. The chute was repaired and reissued to save another pilot's life.

Raesch was temporarily relegated to piloting a Pfalz D.XII before regaining a Fokker D.VII. He had become the de facto squadron leader, as he usually led the aerial combat patrols. In August 1918, Jasta 43 was hampered by shortages of fuel and aircraft. Raesch's diary remarks that the squadron could not fly because it had no serviceable aircraft.

Raesch would not score again until 1750 hours on 28 September 1918, when he shot down a flight commander from No. 29 Squadron RAF, Ernest Charles Hoy. Flying ace Hoy survived the crash of his Royal Aircraft Factory SE.5a east of Ypres, but was captured by German ground troops.

Raesch would not score again until 26 October, when he sent down a SE.5a over Velennes, France. The following day at 1030 hours, he shot down another flight commander from 29 Squadron, Captain Guy Wareing. Wareing's body and aircraft wreckage landed east of Tournai.

On 30 October 1918, Raesch was credited with his final victory, an unidentified enemy aircraft. Raesch's victory tally had reached six enemy fighter planes, plus the unknown craft. On 2 November 1918, Josef Raesch was awarded the First Class Iron Cross, to join the Second Class one awarded earlier. Nine days later, the fighting ended.

Nothing more is known of Josef Raesch, except that as late as 1967, he was known to be working as a machine tool manufacturer.
