= Arthur G. Jones-Williams =

Arthur Gordon Jones-Williams
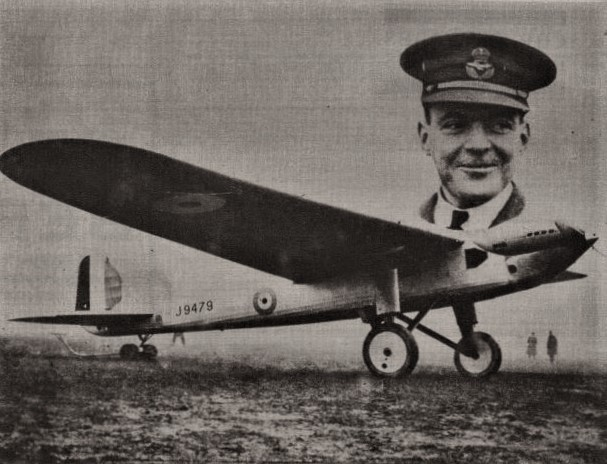
- Born: 6 October 1898
- Died: 17 December 1929 (aged 31); French Tunisia
- Military career
- Allegiance: United Kingdom
- Branch: Royal Flying Corps; Royal Air Force
- Service years: 1916 - 1929
- Rank: Captain
- Units: No. 29 Squadron RFC; No. 65 Squadron RAF
- Conflicts: World War I
- Awards: Order of the British Empire; Military Cross with Bar; French Croix de Guerre

Captain Arthur Gordon Jones-Williams (6 October 1898 – 17 December 1929) was a World War I flying ace originating from Wales. He was credited with eleven aerial victories. In 1929, he made two attempts at setting a nonstop flight record.

== Early life ==
Arthur Gordon Jones-Williams was a Welshman born on 16 October 1898.

== World War I service ==
Jones-Williams joined the Welsh Regiment before being assigned to aviation duty. As of 25 January 1917, Second Lieutenant Jones-Williams was seconded from the Welsh Regiment to the Royal Flying Corps.

Jones-Williams trained with No. 66 Squadron RFC. After transfer, his first victory string was achieved while flying a Nieuport fighter for No. 29 Squadron. He flew as a wingman to D'Arcy Fowlis Hilton; he was also friends with Charles Cudemore.

During May 1917, he was promoted to flight commander and earned a Military Cross. He won a Bar in lieu of a second award in July, then went to hospital. Between 14 April and 23 September 1917, Jones-Williams drove down out of control eight German Albatros fighter planes. Hospitalised and posted back to Britain, he returned to France to serve as a flight commander in No. 65 Squadron.

His second victory string came while flying a Sopwith Camel for No. 65 Squadron. Between 5 September and 4 October 1918, he was credited with three more German Fokker D.VII fighters. (Note: Depending on source, they were judged either all out of control, or two destroyed and one out of control.)

== Post-war service ==
Second lieutenant Jones-Williams had been brevetted a Temporary Captain when promoted to a flight commander's slot on 25 May 1917. On 1 August 1919, he was granted a permanent commission as a captain.

Remaining in the Royal Air Force, he was operating an Airco DH.9a in Kurdistan in 1923.

On 1 January 1928, he was promoted from Flight Lieutenant to Squadron Leader.

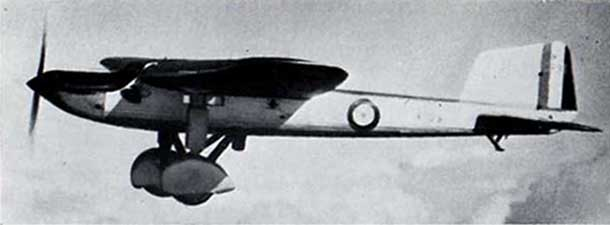
The Fairey Long Range Monoplane.

Between 24 and 26 April 1929, Jones-Williams and his co-pilot Flight-Lieutenant Norman Jenkins made the first flight from the United Kingdom to British India, covering 4,130 miles (6,651 kilometers) between RAF Cranwell and Karachi in 50 hours 48 minutes in a Fairey Long-Range Monoplane, falling only 336 miles (541 kilometers) short of the world non-stop flight distance record.

Jones-Williams tried to better that record later in the year, and died while attempting a nonstop flight from Cranwell, England to Cape Town, South Africa. He crashed at Djbel Lit, Zaghaouan, French Tunisia, on 17 December 1929. He died an intestate bachelor, leaving an estate worth £202.

== Honours and awards ==
Military Cross (MC)

2nd Lt. Arthur Gordon Jones-Williams, Welsh R. and R.F.C.

"For conspicuous gallantry and devotion to duty. He has continuously shown the utmost dash and gallantry in attacking superior numbers of hostile machines. On one occasion he attacked twelve hostile scouts and succeeded in destroying one and driving down another."

Military Cross (MC) Bar

2nd Lt. (T./Capt.) Arthur Gordon Jones-Williams, M.C., Welsh R. (attd. R.F.C.).

For conspicuous gallantry and devotion to duty when engaged in combat with hostile aircraft. On several occasions he attacked enemy formations although they were in superior numbers, fighting them in more than one instance single-handed, and showing the finest offensive spirit. He drove several machines down completely out of control, fighting until his ammunition was expended. Supplement to the London Gazette, 17 September 1917 (30287/9559)

French Croix de Guerre with Palme was gazetted 5 April 1919.

The Order of the British Empire was awarded in June 1927.

The Gold Medal of the Royal Aero Club, 1929.

== Bibliography ==
- Franks, Norman, and Harry Dempsey (2000), Nieuport Aces of World War I (Osprey Aircraft of the Aces No 33), Osprey Publishing. Oxford UK. ISBN 1855329611, ISBN 978-1855329614.
- Shores, Christopher F.; Franks, Norman & Guest, Russell F. (1990). Above the Trenches: a Complete Record of the Fighter Aces and Units of the British Empire Air Forces 1915–1920. London, UK: Grub Street. ISBN 978-0-948817-19-9.
