= Claude Melnot Wilson =

Canadian World War I flying ace

- Born: 28 September 1898; Vancouver, Canada
- Died: 14 October 1918 (aged 20) near Roulers, France
- Burial place: Dadizele New British Cemetery, Dadizele, Belgium
- Military career
- Allegiance: King George V of the British Empire
- Branch: Canadian Expeditionary Force; Royal Flying Corps
- Rank: Lieutenant
- Unit: No. 29 Squadron RAF
- Awards: Distinguished Flying Cross

Lieutenant Claude Melnot Wilson DFC (16 September 1898 – 14 October 1918) was a Canadian World War I flying ace credited with eight aerial victories.

== Early life ==
Claude Melnot Wilson was the son of Margaret and Charles Hurst Wilson of Vancouver, British Columbia, Canada. However, he was a Winnipeg habitué.

== Military service ==
Wilson transferred from artillery to the Royal Flying Corps, and was assigned to No. 29 Squadron RAF on 4 May 1918. Off to hospital on 15 May, he did not return to duty until 23 June. He scored his first one on 22 July 1918, flying a Hannover observation plane down out of control. In August, Wilson tallied six more victories, starting with an Albatros reconnaissance plane destroyed in cooperation with fellow aces Arthur Reed and Henry Coyle Rath on the 8th. His final victory came on 18 September 1918. He used a Royal Aircraft Factory SE.5a for all his victories. His victory roll included five enemy planes and an observation balloon destroyed, and two planes driven down out of control.

== Death in action ==
Wilson was killed in action near Roulers on 14 October 1918, and interred in the New British Cemetery in Dadizele, Belgium in Plot VI.F.26.

== Honours and awards ==
Wilson was posthumously awarded the Distinguished Flying Cross (DFC). The citation reads:

Bold in attack, this officer never hesitates to join in an engagement with the enemy, regardless of their numerical superiority. On 18 August, with four other machines, he attacked a large hostile formation. Five enemy machines were destroyed, Lt. Wilson accounting for one. In all he has four machines and one balloon to his credit.

== Bibliography ==
- Shores, Christopher F.; Franks, Norman & Guest, Russell F. (1990). Above the Trenches: a Complete Record of the Fighter Aces and Units of the British Empire Air Forces 1915–1920. London, UK: Grub Street. ISBN 978-0-948817-19-9.
