= Guy Wareing =

Guy Wilbraham Wareing
- Born: 23 July 1899; Latchford, Warrington, Lancashire
- Died: 27 October 1918 (aged 19) (KIA); East of Tournai, Belgium
- Burial place: Rumillies, Tournai, Belgium; 50°37′12″N 3°26′14″E
- Military career
- Allegiance: United Kingdom
- Branch: British Army; Royal Air Force
- Service years: 1917–1919
- Rank: Captain
- Unit: No. 29 Squadron RAF
- Conflicts: World War I • Western Front
- Awards: Distinguished Flying Cross

Captain Guy Wilbraham Wareing DFC (23 July 1899 – 27 October 1918) was a British World War I flying ace credited with nine aerial victories.

== Biography ==
Wareing was born in Latchford, Warrington, Lancashire, the son of Frederick William Wareing, an engineer, and his wife Jessie Mary.

On 30 August 1917 he was commissioned from cadet to temporary second lieutenant (on probation) on the General List to serve in the Royal Flying Corps, being confirmed in his rank and appointed a flying officer on 14 February 1918.

Wareing was posted to No. 29 Squadron RAF in June 1918 to fly the S.E.5a single-seat fighter. He gained his first victory on 12 August, destroying a Pfalz D.III fighter over Ploegsteert, Belgium. After destroying two reconnaissance aircraft and driving another down out of control, Wareing became both an ace and a balloon buster by destroying an observation balloon over Gheluvelt on 7 September 1918. He then sent a Fokker D.VII down in flames, and destroyed three more balloons, two of them on two separate sorties on 29 September. He was appointed a temporary captain on 7 October 1918.

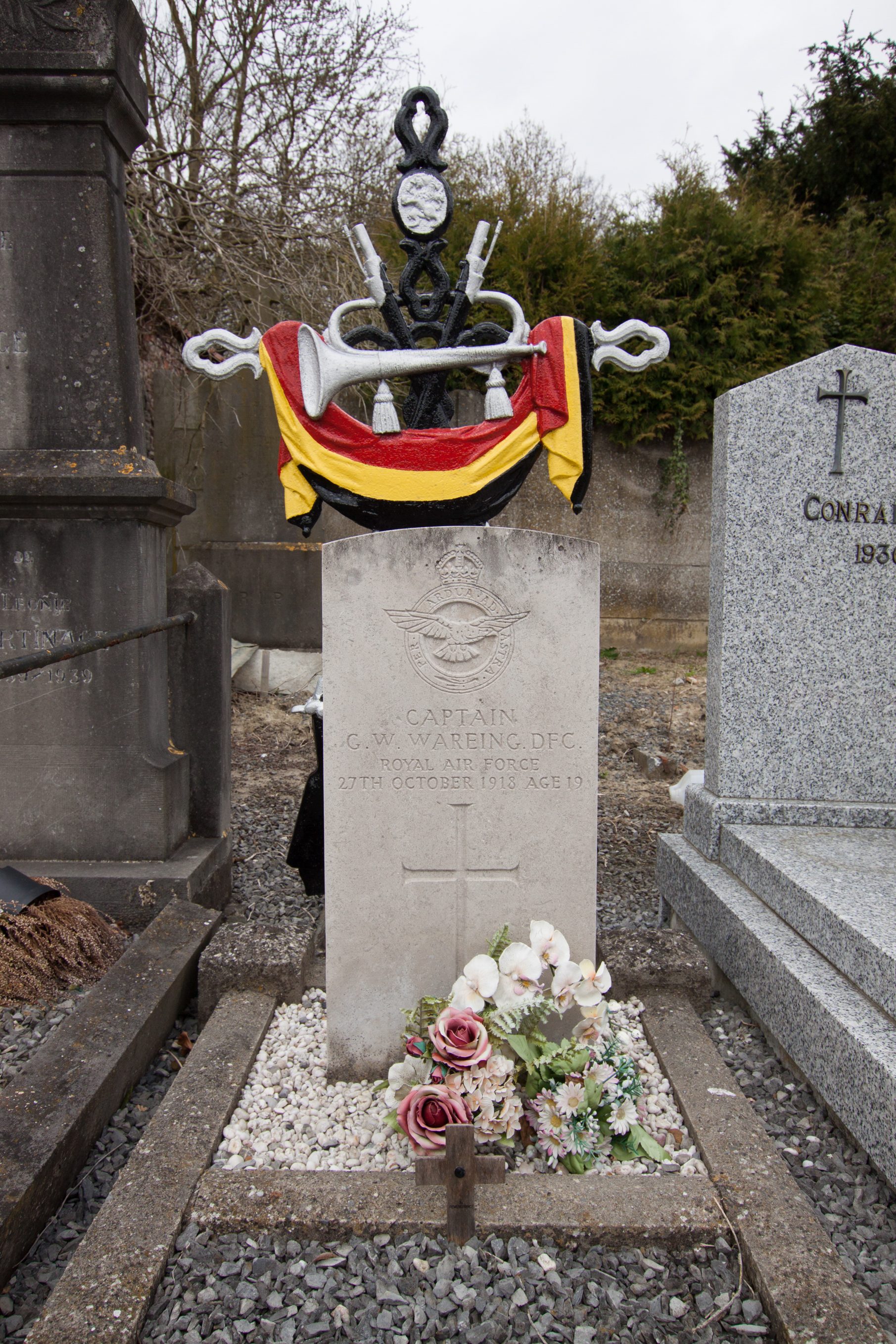
Wareing's grave in Rumillies, April 2015

On 27 October 1918 Wareing was killed when he was shot down by a Fokker D.VII flown by Leutnant Josef Raesch of Jasta 43. He is buried in the churchyard of Église Sainte-Marie-Madeleine, Rumillies, Tournai, Hainaut, Belgium, where his is the only Commonwealth War Grave.

Wareing's award of the Distinguished Flying Cross was gazetted posthumously on 3 December 1918. His citation read:

Lieutenant Guy Wilbraham Wareing.

"A bold and courageous airman who has destroyed four enemy aeroplanes and shot down in flames a hostile balloon. He is conspicuous for zeal and devotion to duty."

== List of aerial victories ==
Combat record
No.	Date/Time	Aircraft/ Serial No.	Opponent	Result	Location
1	12 August 1918 @ 0920	S.E.5a (C1133)	Pfalz D.III	Destroyed	Ploegsteert
2	19 August 1918 @ 1115	S.E.5a (C1133)	DFW C	Destroyed	East of Bailleul
3	31 August 1918 @ 1450	S.E.5a (C1133)	LVG C	Out of control	East of Estaires
4	6 September 1918 @ 1800	S.E.5a (C1133)	DFW C	Destroyed	South-east of Pérenchies
5	7 September 1918 @ 0655	S.E.5a (C1133)	Balloon	Destroyed	Gheluvelt
6	15 September 1918 @ 1845	S.E.5a (C1133)	Fokker D.VII	Destroyed in flames	Roulers-Rumbeke
7	27 September 1918 @ 0845	S.E.5a (C1133)	Balloon	Destroyed	Moorslede
8	29 September 1918 @ 1000	S.E.5a (D6940)	Balloon	Destroyed	South-east of Armentières
9	29 September 1918 @ 1410	S.E.5a (C1133)	Balloon	Destroyed	East of Comines

== Bibliography ==
- Shores, Christopher F.; Franks, Norman & Guest, Russell F. (1990). Above the Trenches: a Complete Record of the Fighter Aces and Units of the British Empire Air Forces 1915–1920. London, UK: Grub Street. ISBN 978-0-948817-19-9.
