= Francis James Davies =

British WWI flying ace (1889–1941)

- Born: 20 October 1889; Alcester, England
- Died: 7 March 1941 (aged 51); Bath, Somerset, England
- Burial place: St Mary's Roman Catholic Church, Studley, Warwickshire
- Military career
- Allegiance: United Kingdom
- Branch: British Army; Royal Air Force
- Service years: 1917–1919; 1940–1941
- Rank: Flight Lieutenant
- Unit: No. 29 Squadron RAF
- Conflicts: World War I World War II
- Awards: Distinguished Flying Cross

Flight Lieutenant Francis James Davies DFC (20 October 1889 – 7 March 1941) was a British World War I flying ace credited with twelve aerial victories. He would briefly return to service during World War II.

== Early life ==
He was born the youngest son of John Davies of Hunt End, Redditch, but spent his youth living at Studley, and was educated at the Roman Catholic School there.

== World War I service ==
Davies joined the Royal Flying Corps in May 1917. He had trained as a pilot by August 1917, being confirmed in his rank of temporary second lieutenant and appointed a flying officer on the 31st. By March 1918, he was assigned to 29 Squadron, which was the last British squadron operating French Nieuports. On the 18th, Davies used a Nieuport to drive down a German Pfalz D.III fighter out of control. By 19 May, he was seated in a Royal Aircraft Factory SE.5a, which he used to destroy an Albatros D.V. On the 26th, he teamed with fellow aces Charles G. Ross and Reginald H. Rusby to destroy a DFW reconnaissance two-seater. He was promoted to temporary captain on 9 June 1918. Davies would score regularly with his SE.5a until 11 August 1918. On that day, for his final victory, he destroyed an observation balloon at Courtrai.

The following day, he flew his last mission of the war, being wounded in action and crash-landing. He fainted as a result of his wound, and fell 100 feet. The accident removed him from combat. His tally of victories was a balloon busted, two enemy planes set on fire, five other planes destroyed, and four planes sent down out of control.

Davies was awarded the Distinguished Flying Cross on 21 September 1918.

== Post-war career ==
Acting Captain Davies resigned his commission on account of ill health caused by his wounds on 5 April 1919.

In 1920 he married Doris Edkins of Great Alne, and they had a daughter and two sons. After living for a while in Shelfield Green, near Alcester, Davies and his family moved to Prestatyn in North Wales. Davies worked for the Enfield Cycle Company Ltd., and developed various business interests, mainly in motor engineering. He also retained an interest in flying, serving as chairman of the Midland Gliding Club.

At the beginning of World War II, Davies was granted a commission as a pilot officer on probation as of 9 July 1940. Flight Lieutenant Davies died on 7 March 1941, as a result of injuries sustained in a car crash at Bath, and is buried at St Mary's Roman Catholic Church, Studley, Warwickshire.

== Honours and awards ==
Distinguished Flying Cross
Lieutenant (Temporary Captain) Francis James Davies.
During recent operations this officer has accounted for five enemy aeroplanes. Bold in attack and skilful in manoeuvre, he is a valuable airman who sets a fine example to all.
