= John Inglis Gilmour =

British flying ace (1896–1928)

- Born: 28 June 1896; Scotland
- Died: 24 February 1928 (aged 31); London, England
- Military career
- Allegiance: United Kingdom
- Branch: British Army; Royal Air Force
- Service years: 1914–1919
- Rank: Major
- Units: No. 27 Squadron RFC; No. 65 Squadron RAF
- Commands: No. 28 Squadron RAF
- Conflicts: First World War
- Awards: Distinguished Service Order; Military Cross & Two Bars; Mentioned in dispatches

John Inglis Gilmour, DSO, MC & Two Bars (28 June 1896 – 24 February 1928) was a British flying ace of the First World War. He was the highest scoring Scotsman in the Royal Flying Corps, with 39 victories.

Gilmour began his military career in the Argyll and Sutherland Highlanders, but was seconded to the Royal Flying Corps. Gaining his wings on 17 March 1916, Gilmour was assigned to pilot the Martinsyde Elephant on the Western Front. He was one of the few successful scorers with the clumsy craft, downing three German opponents. He went on to establish a reputation as a crack bomber formation leader. In late 1917, he advanced to flying a Sopwith Camel fighter as a Flight Commander for No. 65 Squadron. Beginning on 18 December 1916, he reeled off a further 36 victories by 3 July 1918. That included five separate victories on 1 July 1918. He was then promoted to major and sent to command No. 28 Squadron in Italy.

Post war, Gilmour was the air attaché in Rome, then was posted to No. 216 Squadron in the Middle East.

== Early life ==
Gilmour was born in Helensburgh, Dunbartonshire, Scotland, the son of John James Gilmour, a tobacco merchant, and Isabella Inglis. He was educated at the Loretto School in Musselburgh, Edinburgh, and represented the school in rugby and fives. He was also a member of Officers' Training Corps, with the rank of sergeant. In December 1914, aged 18, Gilmour left school and joined the Argyll and Sutherland Highlanders regiment with the rank of second lieutenant.

== Military service ==
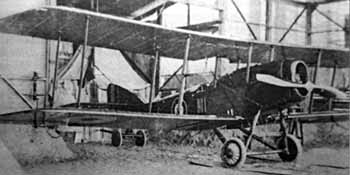
Martinsyde Elephant, as flown by Gilmour.

Gilmour transferred the Royal Flying Corps in December 1915, and was awarded the Royal Aero Club Aviator's Certificate No. 2888 after soloing in a Maurice Farman biplane at the military flying school at Farnborough on 17 March 1916. He was assigned to No. 27 Squadron. They were the sole squadron equipped with the Martinsyde G.100, commonly called the Elephant. This aircraft was nicknamed for being large and ungainly. A single seater, it was too big, slow, and manoeuvrable to be a successful fighter, and without a rear gunner, too defenceless to survive well in a ground attack or bombing role. It was equipped with a Lewis machine gun mounted on the upper wing firing over the propeller, and a second one on the fuselage pointed toward the rear.

Nevertheless, before the Elephants were withdrawn from service, Gilmour scored three victories flying one, though his primary duty was bombing. On 15 September 1916, in conjunction with several other pilots, he destroyed an Albatros D.I. On the 24th, he destroyed a Fokker Eindekker; on the 26th, he drove another down out of control.

On 26 May 1917, Gilmour received the Military Cross (MC) for his prowess as a bombing formation leader. At this point, he was almost certainly still flying the Martinsyde. Late in 1917, Gilmour was assigned to No. 65 Squadron RAF as a flight commander. After a fourteen-month gap in his aerial victory list, he scored flying a Sopwith Camel, on 18 December 1917. His two triumphs that day made him an ace. He shot a triple on 4 January 1918, including one down in flames, and followed it up with number eight on 9 January. He then began to run up his score by single and double victories—two in February, one in March, seven in April, eight in May, four in June. By 29 June, his total was 31.

On 1 July 1918, Gilmour capped his career with a performance that earned him a Distinguished Service Order (DSO). On that evening, within 45 minutes, he burned two Fokker D.VIIs and knocked another down out of control, set an Albatros D.V afire, and drove a Pfalz D.III out of the air. The times on his combat reports make it clear these were five separate engagements; many times, aces reporting multiple victories scored in a single engagement.

Gilmour destroyed a Pfalz the next day, and two the day after, for his final successes. In the end, his victory record showed that he had 1 balloon destroyed, 1 enemy aircraft captured, 24 aircraft destroyed (and 3 shared destroyed) and 10 claimed 'out of control'. Eight of the destroyed craft had gone down in flames, as had the balloon.

He was promoted to major and transferred to Italy to command No. 28 Squadron, but added no further victories to his record. His victory list made him the leading ace of the 13 aces in 65 Squadron.

On 3 August 1918, Gilmour was awarded the DSO; on 16 September, he was gazetted for his second Bar to his MC.

== Postwar career ==
After the war, he had a brief tenure as air attaché in Rome in July 1919. He then transferred to the Middle East to join No. 216 Squadron RAF.

John Gilmour died in St James's Street, Westminster, in February 1928. A verdict of suicide while of unsound mind was returned at an inquest.

Gilmour's medals were auctioned on 13 September 2012, and sold for £40,000.

== Awards and honours ==
Military Cross
Second Lieutenant (Temporary Lieutenant) John Gilmour, Argyll and Sutherland Highlanders and RFC.

For conspicuous gallantry and devotion to duty in carrying out long-distance bomb raids. On one occasion, although his engine began to fail, he continued to lead his formation, and succeeded in bringing back most valuable information.

1st Bar to Military Cross
Lieutenant (Temporary Captain) John Gilmour, MC, Argyll and Sutherland Highlanders and RAF.

For conspicuous gallantry and devotion to duty when engaging hostile aircraft. Within a week he crashed to the ground four enemy machines, and at all times, when on patrol, he never hesitated to attack any enemy in sight. His consistent dash and great fearlessness have been worthy of the highest praise. In all he has ten hostile machines to his credit.

Distinguished Service Order
Lieutenant (Temporary Captain) John Gilmour, MC (formerly Argyll and Sutherland Highlanders).

He is a most inspiriting patrol leader who has destroyed twenty-three enemy aircraft, and shot down eight others out of control. While leading an offensive patrol he shot down one enemy biplane in flames and drove down a second. A short time afterwards he, with four others, attacked about forty enemy scouts. He himself destroyed one in the air, drove another out of control and a third in flames, successfully accounting for five enemy machines in one day.

2nd Bar to Military Cross
Lieutenant (Temporary Captain) John Gilmour, DSO, MC, Argyll and Sutherland Highlanders and RAF.

For conspicuous gallantry and devotion to duty in his leadership of offensive patrols. This officer has lately successfully engaged seven enemy machines, destroying five and shooting down two out of control. He has done splendid service.
