= Frederick Elliott Brown =

- Born: 3 February 1895; Quebec City, Quebec, Canada
- Died: 15 September 1971 (aged 76); Toronto, Ontario, Canada
- Military career
- Allegiance: Canada; United Kingdom
- Branch: Canadian Expeditionary Force; Royal Flying Corps
- Rank: Captain
- Unit: No. 84 Squadron RAF
- Awards: Military Cross with Bar, Mentioned in Dispatches, French Croix de Guerre
- Other work: Instructor in Royal Canadian Air Force during World War II

Captain Frederick Elliott Brown (3 February 1895 – 15 September 1971) was a Canadian World War I flying ace credited with 10 aerial victories. He returned to military service during World War II.

== Early life and service ==
Frederick Elliott Brown was born in Quebec on 3 February 1895. His education progressed to medical studies at Laval University. He joined the 8th Infantry Battalion of the Canadian Expeditionary Force, and later served with the Royal Scots Fusiliers. He is known to have served on the French front from March through July 1916.

== World War I ==
On 4 January 1917, Lieutenant F. E. Brown was seconded for duty with the Royal Flying Corps as a Flying Officer, with seniority from 29 August 1916. On 17 May 1917, he was Mentioned in Despatches by Sir Douglas Haig. On 14 July 1917, he was awarded the French Croix de Guerre. On 8 November 1917, while posted to 84 Squadron as a SE.5a pilot, Brown scored his first aerial victory, driving down an Albatros D.V out of control east of Poelcapelle. The win was shared with James Martin Child.

On 6 February 1918, Brown was appointed a Flight Commander, with the concomitant rank of temporary captain. Ten days later, he scored three individual victories in a 40 minutes stretch; he sent down out of control two Albatros D.Vs over Saint Quentin, then destroyed a German two-seater reconnaissance plane.

March 1918 saw half a dozen triumphs by Brown. He began by sharing in the destruction of an Albatros D.V with George Owen Johnson on the 11th. Over the 17th and 18th, he drove down three more Albatros D.Vs out of control. He rounded off his tally by destroying a Pfalz D.III over Fayet on the 22nd. In all, Brown destroyed four enemy planes and drove down six out of combat. However, on 31 March, he was injured in a landing accident, and removed from duty.

On 22 April 1918, he was awarded the Military Cross:

...Whilst leading a patrol of five machines, on observing four hostile scouts diving on one of our formations, he at once engaged them, driving one of them down completely out of control, while his formation dispersed the others. Later, on sighting another hostile scout, he engaged it and forced it down spinning and out of control. While returning to his aerodrome, he observed an enemy two-seater, and, though his engine was running badly and might have failed him any moment, he attacked it and drove it down in a vertical nose dive. Previously to this he had driven down one other machine, which was seen to crash, and a third completely out of control. He is a most daring and skilful pilot.

On 9 May 1918, he was reported wounded.

On 22 June 1918, he was awarded a Bar to the Military Cross in lieu of a second award:

...During an engagement between fourteen of our scouts and about forty enemy scouts he shot down two enemy machines completely out of control. On another occasion he attacked a formation of seven enemy scouts and destroyed one of them. He has destroyed two other enemy machines and driven down one other out of control. His courage and initiative have been a source of inspiration to all.

== Post-World War I ==
On 12 July 1919, Brown was transferred to the unemployed list of the Royal Air Force for his demobilization.

Frederick Elliott Brown returned to service during World War II, serving as an instructor in the Royal Canadian Air Force.

He died in Toronto on 15 September 1971.
