= Ernest Charles Hoy =

Canadian fighter pilot (1895–1982)

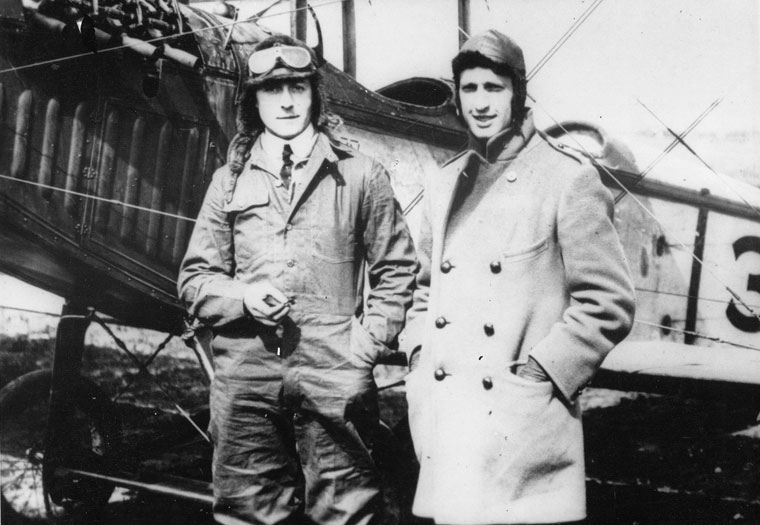
- Born: 6 May 1895; Dauphin, Manitoba, Canada
- Died: 22 April 1982 (aged 86); Toccoa, Georgia, United States
- Military career
- Allegiance: George V of the British Empire
- Branch: Royal Aircraft Factory
- Rank: Captain
- Unit: No. 29 Squadron RAF
- Awards: Distinguished Flying Cross
- Other work: Pioneered airmail flight over the Canadian Rockies

Captain Ernest Charles Hoy DFC (6 May 1895 –22 April 1982) was a Canadian First World War flying ace, officially credited with 13 victories. He later pioneered airmail flight over the Canadian Rockies.

== Early life and service ==
Hoy was serving in the Canadian militia, in the 93rd Regiment, when he enlisted in the regular forces on 3 March 1915. He gave his next of kin as Charles Hoy, and his occupation as salesman.

== First World War service ==
Hoy joined 29 Squadron as a Royal Aircraft Factory pilot in January 1918. He would not begin to score with them until 12 August. He then tallied up seven wins in August, and six more in September. In summary, he shared in being a balloon buster along with Lieutenant Charles Ross and another pilot, as well as downing one of the observation gasbags solo; he destroyed nine enemy airplanes, including a triumph shared with Lieutenant Christoffel Venter; he also drove two planes down out of control.

On 28 September 1918, the day after his final victory, Hoy was shot down by Leutnant Josef Raesch and imprisoned for the rest of the war.

== Post-war ==
In August 1919, Hoy used a Curtiss Jenny to carry the first airmail from Vancouver to Calgary across the Canadian Rocky Mountains; the pioneering flight took sixteen hours, forty-two minutes.

== Honours and awards ==
- 3 December 1918 - Lieut. (A./Capt.) Ernest Charles Hoy is awarded the Distinguished Flying Cross (DFC) in recognition of gallantry in flying operations against the enemy in France:

A bold and skilful airman who has accounted for four enemy machines and shot down a balloon in flames, displaying at all times a fine fighting spirit, disregarding adverse odds.

— London Gazette
