= George M. Cox =

British WW1 flying ace

George Montague Cox
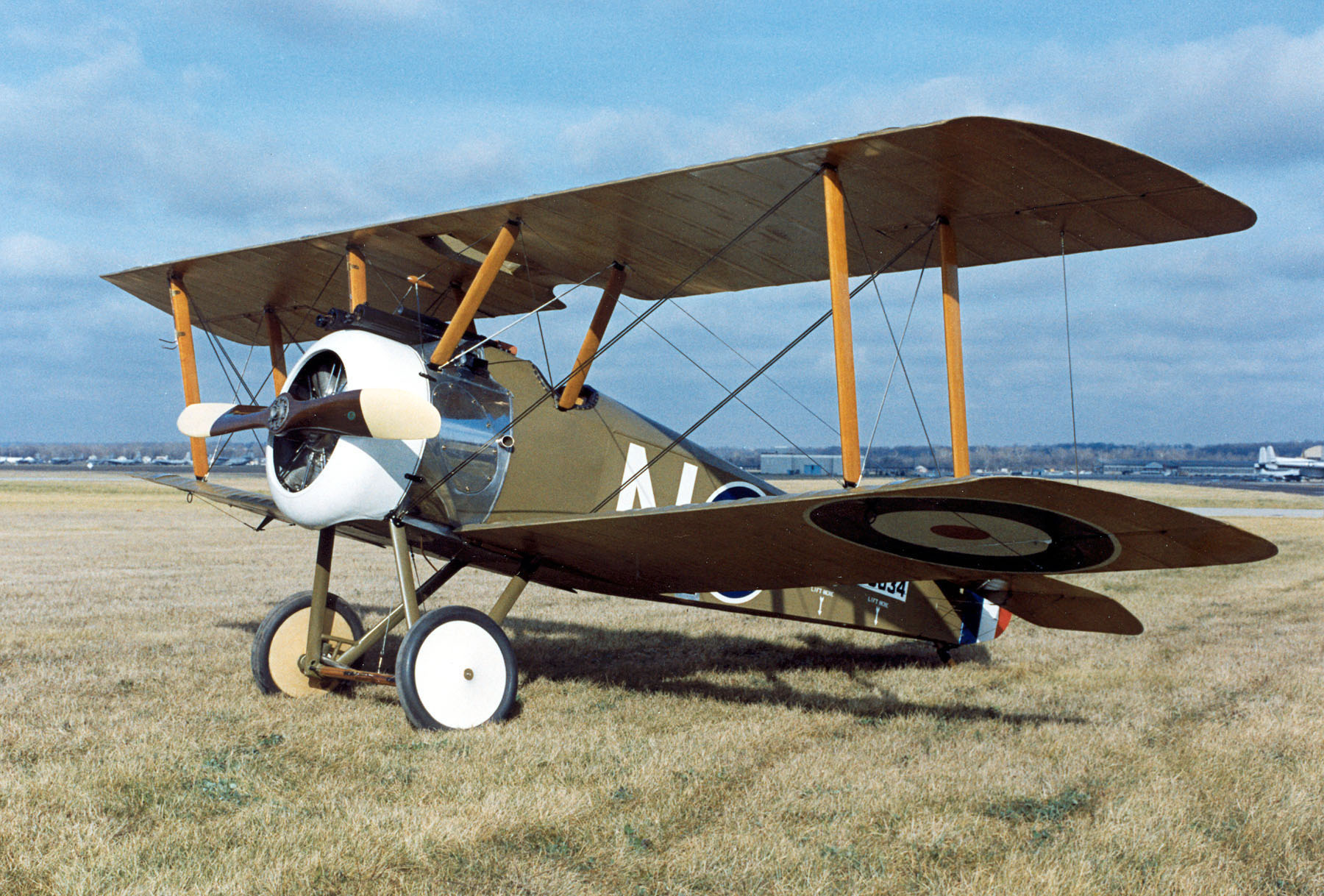
- Sopwith Camel bi-plane fighter aircraft
- Born: 31 October 1892; Calcutta, India
- Died: 19 February 1977 (aged 84); Huntingdon, Cambridgeshire, England
- Military career
- Allegiance: England
- Branch: Flying service
- Rank: Wing Commander
- Unit: No. 65 Squadron
- Awards: Member of the Order of the British Empire; Military Cross; Air Force Cross

George Montague Cox MBE, MC, AFC, Order of the Crown (Belgium) was a British World War I flying ace credited with five aerial victories.

== Early life ==
Cox was born in Calcutta, India, on 31 October 1892. He was the son of Horace and Alice Emily Cox.

== Military career ==
Cox served originally in the Royal Berkshire Regiment, being commissioned on 18 December 1914. In 1916, he transferred to the Royal Flying Corps. He received Royal Aero Club Aviator's Certificate 3847 in a Maurice Farman biplane at Military School, Catterick Bridge on 20 November 1916. Posted to No. 65 Squadron in 1917, where he scored five victories flying the Sopwith Camel.

After training as a fighter pilot, he was posted in 1917 to 65 Squadron where he flew Sopwith Camels; particularly no. B2411. He tallied his first victory on 15 November 1917. He scored four more in the period to 17 May 1918, with his last one recorded while flying Camel no. C8272. Cox was awarded the Military Cross for his bravery and success.

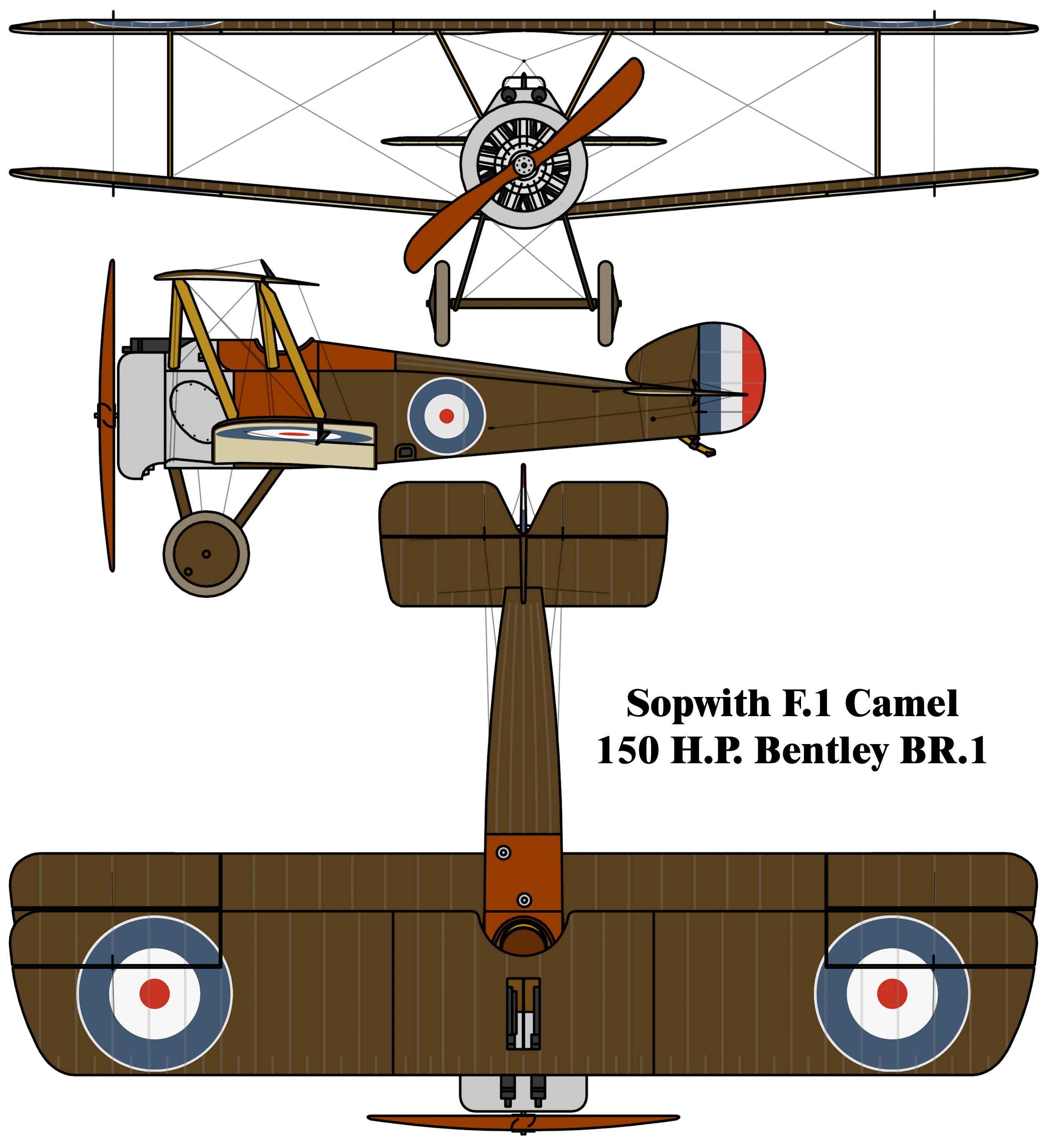
Sopwith Camel.

| Date | Time | Squadron | Aircraft | Opponent | Destroyed or Out of Control | Location |
|---|---|---|---|---|---|---|
| 15 November 1917 | 0740 | 65 | Sopwith Camel (B2411) | Albatros D.III | (OOC) | Dadizeele |
| 14 January 1918 | 1155 | 65 | Sopwith Camel (B2411) | C | (DES) | Westroosebeke |
| 9 March 1918 | 1010 | 65 | Sopwith Camel (B2411) | Fokker DR.I | (DES) | Becelaere-Dadizeele |
| 13 March 1918 | 1605 | 65 | Sopwith Camel (B2411) | C | (OOC) | Houthem |
| 17 May 1918 | 1045 | 65 | Sopwith Camel (C8272) | Pfalz D.III | (DES) | Demuin |

He then was transferred within theatre to command No. 2 Test Flight RAF. Cox married Marjorie Evans on 16 April 1919 at Acton in Middlesex, they had two sons, Peter and John. He was transferred to the unemployed list on 16 June 1919.

Cox was commissioned as flying officer in the General Duties Branch, Class A of the Royal Air Force Reserve of Air Force Officers on 6 March 1928, being confirmed in the rank on 6 September 1928, and flight lieutenant on 6 August 1929. On 6 March 1933 he was transferred to Class C of the Reserve.

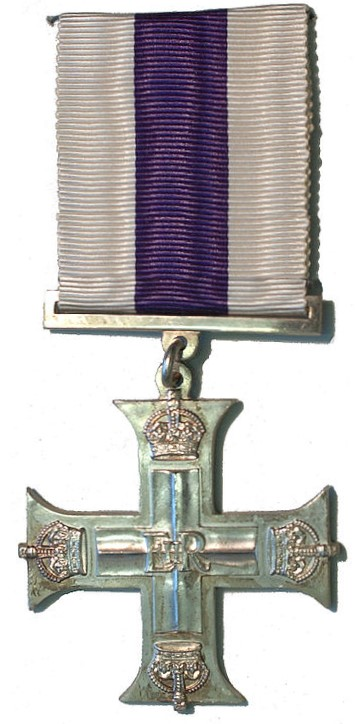
Military Cross.

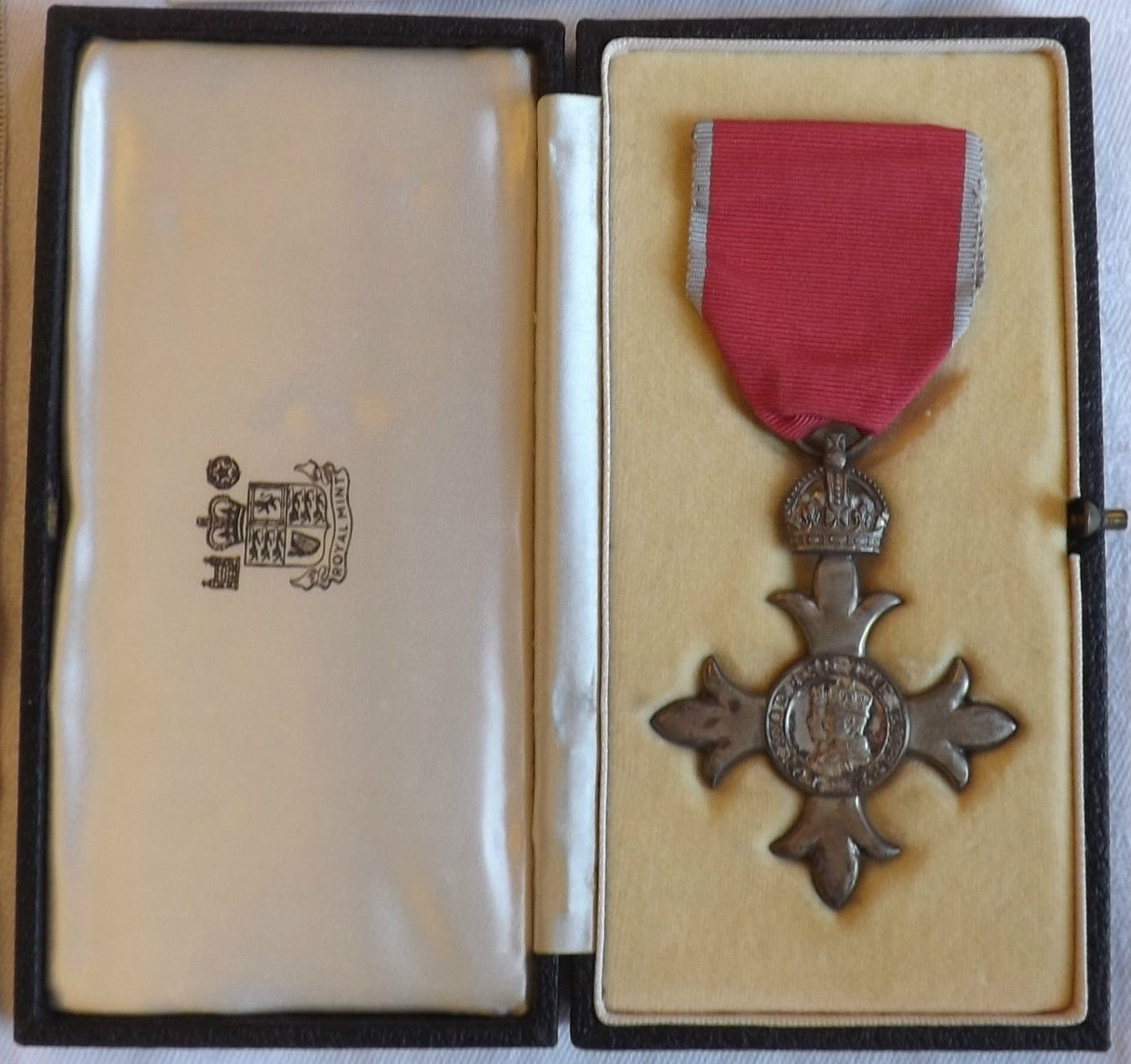
MBE in its presentation case.

During World War II Cox was serving with the Royal Air Force General Duties Branch of the Reserve of Air Force Officers as a flying instructor when his tireless work was recognized with the award of an Air Force Cross. He was promoted to squadron leader in March 1941, and wing commander on 1 June 1942.

Cox retired as wing commander on 10 February 1954.

== Later life ==
In June 1958, having been Assistant Airport Manager, Prestwick Airport and Ministry of Transport and Civil Aviation, George Montague Cox was appointed an Ordinary Member of the Civil Division of the Most Excellent Order of the British Empire (MBE). He died on 19 February 1977, aged 84, at Huntingdon, in Cambridgeshire.

== Honours and awards ==
- Military Cross (MC) awarded in July 1918 as T./Capt. George Montague Cox, Gen. List and R.A.F.

For conspicuous gallantry and devotion to duty. On numerous occasions during recent operations he has descended to very low altitudes, and has attacked with bombs and machine-gun fire enemy troops forming up for attack. Thanks to his dash and intrepidity hostile bodies of troops have suffered very severe casualties and have been scattered in all directions. He has in all destroyed four hostile machines, and has at all times displayed the greatest gallantry.[1]

- Air Force Cross (AFC) awarded in October 1940 as Flight Lieutenant George Montague Cox, MC (70144), Reserve of Air Force Officers.
- Officer of the Order of the Crown (Belgium) awarded in March 1951.
- Ordinary Member of the Civil Division of the Most Excellent Order of the British Empire (MBE).

== Bibliography ==
- Bowyer, Chaz (1998). Royal Flying Corps Communiques 1917–18. London: Grub Street. ISBN 1-898697-79-5.
- Henshaw, Trevor (1995). The Sky Their Battlefield. London: Grub Street. ISBN 1-898697-30-2.
- Shores, Christopher (1990). Above The Trenches. London: Grub Street. ISBN 0-948817-19-4.
