= Hilliard Brooke Bell =

Canadian flying ace

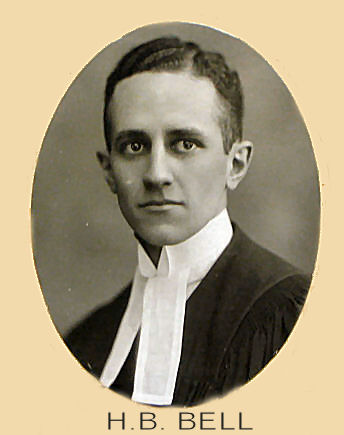
- Graduation photo from Osgoode Hall Law School
- Born: 9 March 1897; Chatham, Ontario, Canada
- Died: 16 September 1960 (aged 63); Toronto, Ontario, Canada
- Military career
- Allegiance: Canada; United Kingdom (Note: Canadian airmen were required to complete an Attestation Paper in which they declared an oath of allegiance to King George V and agreed to serve in any arm of the service for the duration of the war between Great Britain and Germany.)
- Branch: Canadian Expeditionary Force; British Army; Royal Flying Corps; Royal Air Force
- Service years: 1916–1919
- Rank: Captain
- Units: 67th (University of Toronto) Battery, Canadian Field Artillery; No. 81 Squadron RFC; No. 66 Squadron RFC/RAF
- Conflicts: World War I; Western Front; Italian Front
- Awards: Military Cross; Medal of Military Valor (Italy)
- Other work: Lawyer

Captain Hilliard Brooke Bell MC QC (9 March 1897 – 16 September 1960) was a Canadian First World War flying ace credited with ten aerial victories while serving in the British Royal Flying Corps and Royal Air Force.

== Early life and education ==
Hilliard Brooke Bell was born to Edwin and Sarah R. Bell (née Brooke) in Chatham, Ontario, but later the family moved to Toronto. Bell was educated at St. Andrew's College, Aurora, where he joined the College Officer Training Corps. He then attended University College, Toronto, where he became a member of the Alpha Delta Phi Fraternity. Hilliard gave up his studies to join the 67th (University of Toronto) Battery Depot, Canadian Field Artillery, at Kingston on 23 May 1916.

== World War I ==
Bell initially served as a gunner, until commissioned as a lieutenant in November. He then waited for a posting to a battery for five months, before eventually requesting a transfer to the Royal Flying Corps. He began his training in early 1917 at Camp Borden, and following instruction in aeroplane construction, began flight training, and flew solo. On 23 July Bell was appointed a second lieutenant on probation in the Royal Flying Corps, and sailed from Montreal to England in August, where he received advanced flying training with No. 81 Squadron RFC at Scampton, initially on the Avro 504, then the Bristol M.1c. He was confirmed in his rank, and appointed a flying officer, on 4 September.

With only six hours of solo flying in the M.1c, Bell was sent to France on 16 October, travelling to Saint-Omer by train, where he joined No. 66 Squadron RFC. His first flight in France was on 18 October in a Sopwith Pup to familiarize himself with the aircraft and the location. He made a second flight later the same day going up to an altitude of 21,000 ft (6,400 m). Over the next month No. 66 Squadron were re-equipped with the Sopwith Camel. In November No. 66 Squadron was one of six RFC squadrons sent to Italy, to reinforce the Italian Front after the disaster at Caporetto. Their aircraft were dismantled, crated, and loaded onto flat cars. The squadron's personnel also travelled by train to Milan, where they were quartered at the best hotel in the city for a week, until the weather cleared and they could make the 1½ hour flight to Verona, finally arriving at their base at Grossa on 4 December.

Bell gained his first aerial victory on 16 December 1917 by driving down an Albatros D.V out of control. Further victories followed on 4 February 1918, by shooting an Albatros D.III down in flames, and he destroyed an Aviatik two-seater on 6 February. On 23 February, even though he was still only a second lieutenant, he was appointed a flight commander with the temporary rank of captain. He drove down a Berg fighter on 16 March, and on 19 March destroyed another Albatros D.III, for his fifth victory, making him an ace. He accounted for two more D.III's destroyed on 23 April and 3 May. On 8 May he was awarded the Military Cross, which was gazetted on 16 September. His citation read:

Temporary Captain Hilliard Brooke Bell, RAF.

"For conspicuous gallantry and devotion to duty. He destroyed five enemy machines, and drove down one out of control. He is a very fine patrol leader and an excellent officer. His work is thoroughly good, all round."

He went on to gain three more victories over enemy fighters on 10 May, and 1 and 4 July, before being posted back to England to serve as an instructor. On 2 November 1918, he was awarded the Bronze Medal of Military Valor "in recognition of distinguished services rendered" by the Italian government. He was transferred to the RAF's unemployed list on 5 April 1919.

=== List of aerial victories ===
Combat record
No.	Date/Time	Aircraft/ Serial No.	Opponent	Result	Location
1	16 December 1917 @ 1400	Sopwith Camel (B5223)	Albatros D.V	Out of control	North-east of Casa de Felice
2	4 February 1918 @ 1250	Sopwith Camel (B4628)	Albatros D.III	Destroyed in flames	1/2 mi (0.80 km) south-west of San Giacomo di Veglia
3	6 February 1918 @ 0820	Sopwith Camel (B5172)	Aviatik C	Destroyed	South-east of Giacomo di Veglia
4	16 March 1918 @ 1200	Sopwith Camel (B5180)	Berg D	Out of control	La Parada
5	19 March 1918 @ 1025	Sopwith Camel (B5180)	Albatros D.III	Destroyed	San Giacomo di Veglia
6	23 April 1918 @ 0850	Sopwith Camel (B5180)	Albatros D.III	Destroyed in flames	Monte Mosciagh
7	3 May 1918 @ 1150	Sopwith Camel (B5180)	Albatros D.III	Destroyed	Ormelle
8	10 May 1918 @ 0930	Sopwith Camel (B5180)	Albatros D.III	Destroyed in flames	Monte Meatta
9	1 July 1918 @ 0900	Sopwith Camel (D9388)	Pfalz D.III	Destroyed	Cima di Vezzano
10	4 July 1918 @ 0750	Sopwith Camel (D9388)	Pfalz D.III	Destroyed	West of Asiago

== Post-war career ==
Bell returned to his law studies in Toronto, graduating from Osgoode Hall and being called to the Bar of Ontario in 1921. He was appointed King's Counsel in 1935, and practised as a lawyer until his death in hospital in Toronto on 16 September 1960.

His War Experiences were published posthumously in the Journal of the Canadian Aviation Historical Society in 1963–64.
