= No. 65 Squadron RAF =

Defunct flying squadron of the Royal Air Force

No. 65 (East India) Squadron RAF
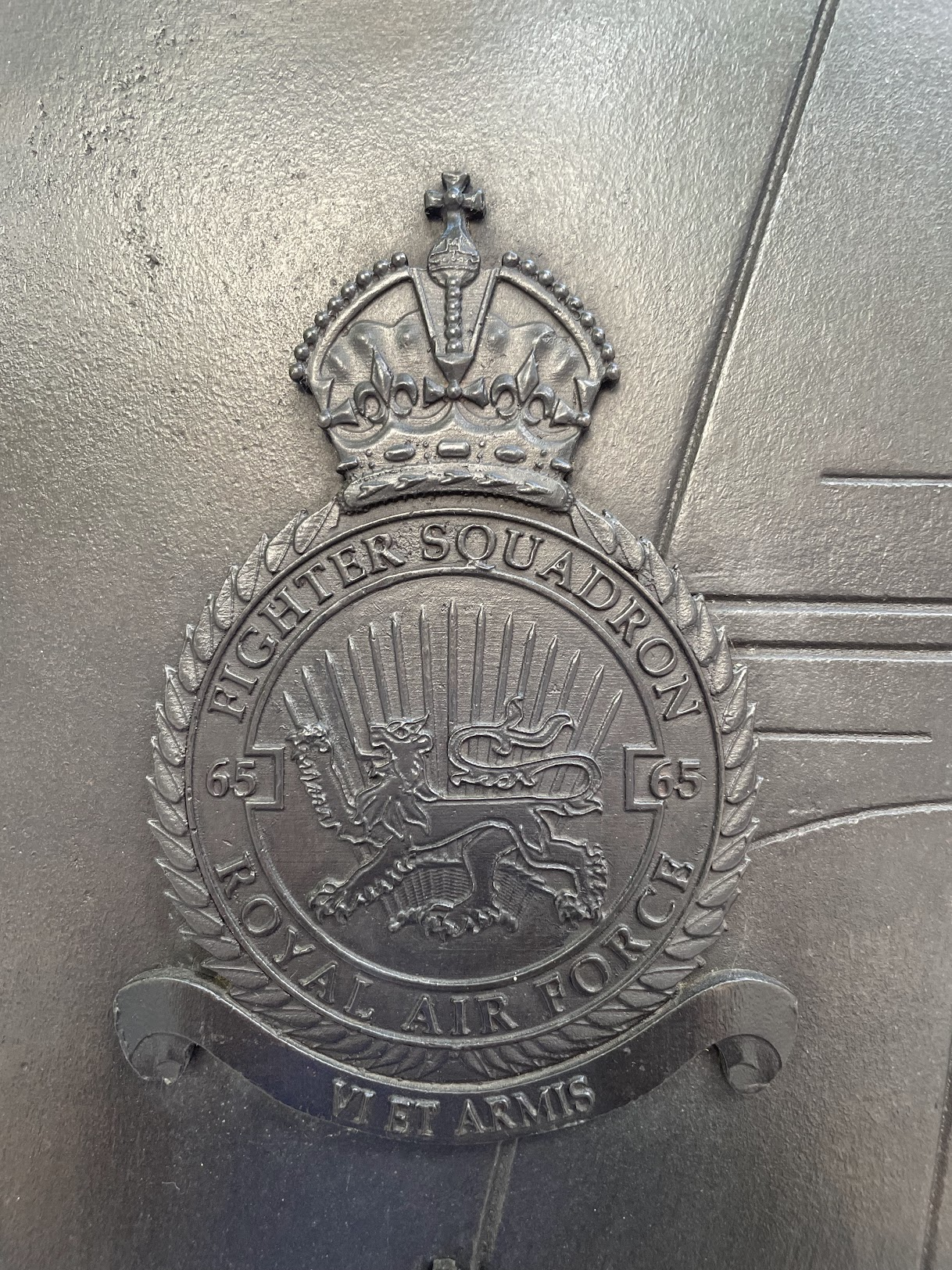
- Active: 1 August 1916 (RFC) to 1919; 1934–1961; 1964–1970; 1970–1974; 1986–1992
- Country: United Kingdom
- Branch: Royal Air Force
- Role: Heraldic badge of the squadron displayed on the Battle of Britain Monument in London
- Mottos: Latin: Vi et armis "By force and arms"
- Battle honours: Western Front, 1917–1918*: Cambrai, 1918*: Somme, 1918*: France & Low Countries*: Dunkirk: Battle of Britain, 1940*: Home Defence, 1940–42: Fortress Europe, 1941–1944*: Channel & North Sea, 1942–1945*: Dieppe: Normandy, 1944: Arnhem: France & Germany, 1944–1945*: Baltic 1945: Honours marked with an asterisk are those emblazoned on the Squadron Standard

Insignia
- Squadron Badge heraldry: In front of fifteen swords in pile, the hilts in base, a lion passant. The number of swords refers to a memorable combat in which fifteen enemy aircraft were destroyed.
- Post 1950 Squadron Roundel
- Squadron codes: FZ (Oct 1938 – Sep 1939); YT (Sep 1939 – Apr 1951)

No. 65 Squadron was a flying squadron of the Royal Air Force, which formed in 1916. the squadron saw action in both the First and the Second World Wars, before being reformed as a Bloodhound unit in the 1960s. The squadron then became an Operational Conversion Unit before disbanding in 1992.

== First World War ==
The squadron was first formed at Wyton on 1 August 1916 as a squadron of the Royal Flying Corps with a core provided from the training station at Norwich. It served as a training unit as part of the Norwich-based No. 7 Training Wing until equipping with Sopwith Camels and transferring to France as an operational fighter squadron in October 1917. By the end of the First World War, it had claimed about 200 victories, including one incident a week before the Armistice, when a dogfight between the squadron and enemy aircraft resulted in at least nine enemy aircraft shot down, and a further 'probable' eight victories. Thirteen aces had served with it, including: John Inglis Gilmour, Joseph White, Maurice Newnham, Thomas Williams, William Harry Bland, Alfred Leitch, Jack Armand Cunningham, Godfrey Brembridge, and George M. Cox. Arthur G. Jones-Williams, who would go on to long-range flight record attempts in 1929, also served in the squadron.

The squadron was disbanded at RAF Yatesbury in October 1919.

== Second World War ==
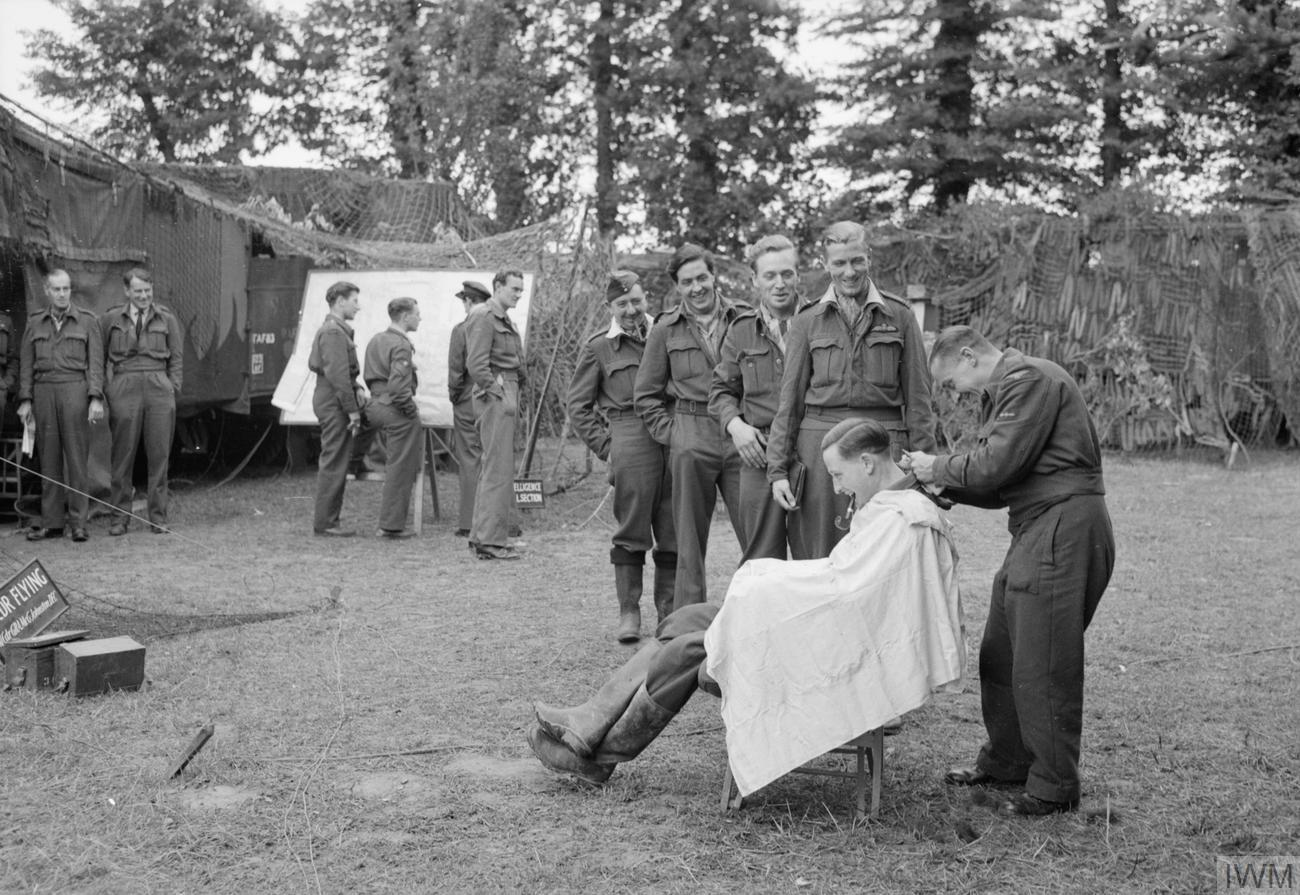
Pilots line up for a haircut while waiting on standby near the No. 122 Wing Operations Room at Martragny, Normandy. In the chair is Flying Officer J. M. W. Lloyd of No. 65 Squadron RAF.

The squadron reformed in 1934 at RAF Hornchurch with the Hawker Demon, converting to the Gloster Gauntlet in 1936 and the Gloster Gladiator in 1937. During World War II, the squadron operated Supermarine Spitfires, having converted from Gladiators in 1939. The squadron was active during the Battle of Britain, with at least one pilot, Bolesław Drobiński, shooting down at least seven enemy aircraft. Another noted pilot was Wing Commander Brendan Eamonn Fergus Finucane better known as Paddy Finucane, who flew with the squadron in 1940 and 1941. In December 1943, the squadron converted to North American Mustangs. For a period of time their Wing Commander was Reg Grant.

== Post war ==
In 1946, the unit converted to the Spitfire LF.XVIe and then the de Havilland Hornet, the Gloster Meteor F.4 and F.8, then the Hawker Hunter F.6 (December 1956) at RAF Duxford from August 1952 until the squadron disbanded on 31 March 1961, and then reformed in 1964 as a surface-to-air missile unit, operating the Bristol Bloodhound. During this period, it was based at RAF Seletar, Singapore, and it disbanded again in 1970. From 1970, No. 65 Squadron became the reserve squadron number for No. 226 Operational Conversion Unit RAF at RAF Coltishall, until its disbandment in the mid-1970s. It was thereafter the reserve squadron number of No. 229 Operational Conversion Unit RAF at RAF Coningsby. It was last disbanded at RAF Coningsby in June 1992, by re-numbering as No. 56 (Reserve) Squadron, after serving as the Operational conversion unit for the Panavia Tornado F.2 and F.3 interceptor, with the alternative identity of No. 229 Operational Conversion Unit RAF.
