= Charles G. Ross (SAAF officer) =

Charles Gordon Ross
- Born: March 12, 1892; Johannesburg, South African Republic
- Died: Unknown
- Military career
- Allegiance: South Africa
- Branch: Royal Flying Corps; South African Air Force
- Rank: Brigadier
- Unit: No. 29 Squadron RAF
- Awards: Order of the British Empire, Distinguished Flying Cross, Belgian Croix de guerre
- Other work: Served in South African Air Force as brigadier

Brigadier Charles Gordon Ross CBE DFC (born 12 March 1892, date of death unknown) was a career soldier who served in both the Royal Air Force and the South African Air Force. He was a quadruple ace, being credited with 20 victories during World War I.

== World War I service ==
Ross originally served in the Royal Flying Corps, having joined in August 1917. He was assigned to 29 Squadron RAF on 25 March 1918 as a Royal Aircraft Factory SE.5a pilot. He began his victory roll on 26 May 1918; by 10 November, the day before the armistice, he had accounted for two observation balloons and sixteen enemy planes destroyed, and two planes driven down out of control. Although he shared some of his victories with others, such as Francis James Davies, Reginald H. Rusby, Ernest Charles Hoy, and Arthur Reed, Ross also singlehandedly destroyed eight enemy fighters.

== Post World War I ==
Ross stayed with his squadron when it was posted to Cologne as part of the Army of Occupation. In 1921, he left the RAF to enroll in the new South African Air Force. He was appointed a CBE during World War II, and retired a Brigadier.

== Honors and awards ==
Distinguished Flying Cross (DFC) awarded 2 November 1918

Lt. Charles Gordon Ross.

An airman who has accounted for four enemy machines. On 8 August, while on offensive patrol, he engaged a two-seater, driving it down. On his return journey, he destroyed a hostile balloon; the observer escaped via parachute.

Distinguished Flying Cross (DFC) Bar awarded 3 December 1918

Lieut. (A./Capt.) Charles Gordon Ross, D.F.C. (FRANCE)

A fine fighting pilot and leader who has destroyed twelve enemy machines. On 2 October, Ross with three other machines, attacked eight Fokker biplanes; in the engagement that followed four of these were destroyed, Capt. Ross accounting for one.

Belgian Croix de Guerre

Awarded by His Majesty, King of the Belgians, on 15 July 1919.

Insignia of the Order of Saint Sava (Fourth Class)

Awarded by His Majesty, the King of the Serbs, Croats and Slovenes, on 31 July 1929

Order of the British Empire

Charles Gordon Ross was appointed an Additional Commander of the Military Division of the Order of the British Empire on 1 January 1945.
