= Ernst Wiehle =

- Born: 24 November 1894; Harzgerode, German Empire
- Died: Unknown
- Military career
- Allegiance: Germany
- Branch: Luftstreitkräfte
- Service years: 1913-1918
- Rank: Vizefeldwebel
- Unit: Schutzstaffel (Protection Squadron) 3, Jagdstaffel (Fighter Squadron) 43
- Awards: Iron Cross First and Second Class

Vizefeldwebel Ernst Wiehle (born 24 November 1894, date of death unknown) was a World War I flying ace credited with six aerial victories.

== Biography ==
Ernst Wiehle was born in Harzgerode, the German Empire, on 24 November 1894. He entered the German military on 15 October 1913, joining a Saxon Pioneer Battalion. When World War I began, he went into the early battles with this unit. On 16 March 1915, he was awarded the Iron Cross Second Class for his valor. On 12 July 1915, he was wounded in action.

Wiehle switched to aviation duty on 2 December 1915. On 10 December, he was promoted to Unteroffizier. He underwent aviation training at Fliegerersatz-Abteilung (Replacement Detachment) 5 in Hannover and Fliegerersatz-Abteilung (Replacement Detachment) 9 in Darmstadt. He seems to have then gone directly to Jastaschule (Fighter School) I in Valenciennes, France.

Despite being trained in single-seat fighters, his first operational assignment was as a two-seater pilot with Schutzstaffel (Protection Squadron) 3 on 7 February 1917. With Gefreiter May manning the observer's guns in the rear seat, he and May shot down a SPAD over Corbeny on 16 April 1917. Two days later, he was promoted to Vizefeldwebel. On 9 September 1917, he was granted the Iron Cross First Class.

He was transferred to a single-seat fighter squadron, Jagdstaffel 43, on 26 June 1918. Between 22 July 1918 and 29 October 1918, he shot down a Sopwith Camel and four Royal Aircraft Factory SE.5s.
