= Hunt End =

District of Redditch, Worcestershire, England

Coordinates: 52.276541°N 1.94841°W

- Location within Worcestershire
- District: Redditch
- Shire county: Worcestershire
- Region: West Midlands
- Country: England
- Sovereign state: United Kingdom
- Post town: REDDITCH
- Postcode district: B97
- Dialling code: 01527
- Police: West Mercia
- Fire: Hereford and Worcester
- Ambulance: West Midlands

Hunt End is a district of Redditch in Worcestershire, England.

Saint Augustine's Catholic High School is in Hunt End, it is the only Catholic high school in the town.

A number of businesses operate in Hunt End Industrial Estate.

The Red Lion pub is in Hunt End.
