= D'Arcy Fowlis Hilton =

Canadian-born American World War I flying ace

- Born: 17 October 1889; Toronto, Ontario, Canada
- Died: October 1973 (aged 83-84); St. Catharines, Ontario, Canada
- Military career
- Allegiance: Canada; United Kingdom
- Branch: Royal Flying Corps
- Service years: 1917–c.1918
- Rank: Lieutenant
- Unit: No. 29 Squadron RAF
- Awards: Military Cross, Air Force Cross

Lieutenant D'Arcy Fowlis Hilton was a Canadian-born American World War I flying ace credited with eight aerial victories.

== Early life ==
D'Arcy Fowlis Hilton was the son of Francis Alfred and Isabel Grace Milligan Hilton. Though born in Canada, he called Michigan home; he also lived in Youngstown, New York.

On 28 January 1914, he married Gladys Caroline Woodruff in St. Thomas, Ontario, Canada. They separated in 1916, after a son was born, and he went to England and joined the Royal Flying Corps (RFC) in November. He was commissioned a second lieutenant on 21 November 1916.

== World War I service ==
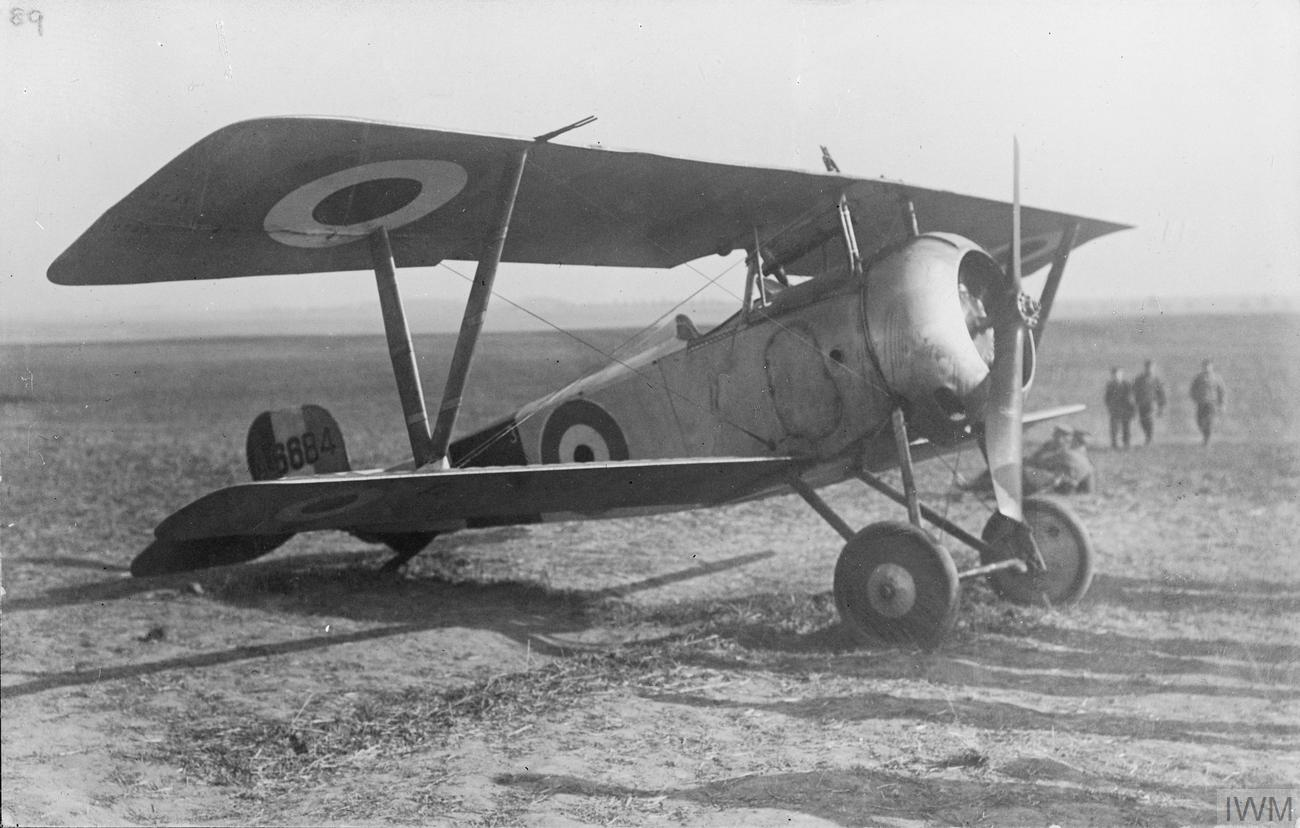
Hilton flew a Nieuport 17 for all his victories.

Hilton earned his Royal Aero Club Certificate No. 4717 on 17 May 1917. He was then assigned to fly a Nieuport 17 with No. 29 Squadron RFC. On 31 July 1917, he destroyed an Albatros D.V fighter and an observation balloon. Over the next three and a half months, he proceeded to drive down out of control five more Albatros D.Vs and an observation plane, with the last victory coming on 13 November 1917. He was gazetted the Military Cross on 17 December 1917. Following his tour of combat, Fowler became a flight instructor in both England and Canada, and earned the Air Force Cross in the process.

== Post war ==
Gladys Caroline Woodruff sued him for divorce via act of legislature in 1922. He was then estranged from his family until early in World War II when his son was killed in aerial combat.

D'Arcy Fowlis Hilton died in October 1973 in St. Catharines, Ontario, Canada.

== Honors and awards ==
Military Cross (MC)

2nd/Lt. D'Arcy Fowlis Hilton, R.F.C., Spec. Res.

For conspicuous gallantry and devotion to duty in attacking enemy aircraft and engaging troops on the ground. While on patrol he attacked single-handed six two-seater machines, forcing one down and driving the rest back. He has driven down five other machines.

== Sources ==
- Above the Trenches: a Complete Record of the Fighter Aces and Units of the British Empire Air Forces 1915–1920. Shores, Christopher F.; Franks, Norman & Guest, Russell F. Grub Street, 1990. ISBN 978-0-948817-19-9.
- American Aces of World War 1 Harry Dempsey. Osprey Publishing, 2001. ISBN 1-84176-375-6, ISBN 978-1-84176-375-0.
- Nieuport Aces of World War 1. Norman Franks. Osprey Publishing, 2000. ISBN 1-85532-961-1, ISBN 978-1-85532-961-4.
- Over the Front: A Complete Record of the Fighter Aces and Units of the United States and French Air Services, 1914-1918 Norman L. R. Franks, Frank W. Bailey. Grub Street, 1992. ISBN 0-948817-54-2, ISBN 978-0-948817-54-0.
