= Adolf Gutknecht =

German World War I flying ace

- Born: 12 September 1891; Badingen
- Died: Unknown
- Military career
- Allegiance: Germany
- Branch: Aviation
- Rank: Oberleutnant
- Unit: Jagdstaffel 43
- Commands: Jagdstaffel 43
- Awards: Iron Cross

Oberleutnant Adolf Gutknecht (born 12 September 1891, date of death unknown) was a World War I flying ace credited with eight aerial victories.

== Biography ==
Adolf Gutknecht was born in Badingen, Germany, on 12 September 1891. In the years before World War I, he joined the army as a cadet. In the beginning of the war, he campaigned in France, Bulgaria, and Macedonia. He transferred to aviation as an aerial observer, and scored a victory in June 1916. He subsequently became a pilot, having won both classes of the Iron Cross.

On 1 June 1918, he became Staffelführer of Jagdstaffel 43. The squadron was mounted on Albatros D.III and Albatros D.Va fighters. It would remain at Haubourdin Aerodrome until 22 August, by which time Gutknecht would have run his victory string to five confirmed and one unconfirmed. He was also promoted to Oberleutnant.

Gutknecht won three more victories while remaining in command of Jasta 43 until 2 November 1918. He was in hospital from 25 October onwards to war's end, however.
