= Edgar O. Amm =

South African flying ace (1898–1953)

Edgar Oxenham Amm
- Born: 19 August 1898; Johannesburg, South Africa
- Died: 25 March 1953 (aged 54); Park Nursing Home, Johannesburg, South Africa
- Military career
- Allegiance: United Kingdom; Union of South Africa
- Branch: British Army; Royal Air Force; South African Air Force
- Service years: 1917–1919; 1939–1945
- Rank: Major
- Nickname: Porkey
- Unit: No. 29 Squadron RAF
- Conflicts: World War I; Western Front; World War II
- Awards: Distinguished Flying Cross & Bar; Croix de guerre (Belgium)
- Other work: Farmer and businessman

Major Edgar Oxenham Amm DFC & Bar (19 August 1898 – 25 March 1953) was a South African flying ace during World War I, credited with ten aerial victories. He returned to service during World War II. Between the wars, and after World War II, he was a farmer and businessman.

== Early life and background ==
Amm was born in Johannesburg, the fourth child (and second son) of Edwin John Amm and Amy Celia Hill.

== World War I ==
After leaving school Amm joined the Royal Flying Corps in South Africa as a temporary second lieutenant (on probation). Having successfully completed his basic flight training, he was confirmed in his rank and made a flying officer on 19 November 1917. He travelled to Britain in early 1918.

On 1 April 1918, the Army's Royal Flying Corps and the Royal Naval Air Service (RNAS) were merged to form the Royal Air Force. Amm was posted to France in early July 1918, to fly the S.E.5a single-seat fighter in No. 29 Squadron RAF. He was almost immediately successful, setting a German Fokker D.VII fighter on fire on 12 August 1918. He gained two more victories in August, two in September, three in October. On 9 November, he drove down one Fokker D.VII and set another on fire. In turn, he was shot down by a third D.VII, but was captured unharmed. Initially listed as missing he spent a very short spell as a prisoner of war; one version of his repatriation has him riding a bicycle into his old unit on 24 November; another says he was held for only 48 hours. A summary of Amm's victories credits him with seven enemy aircraft and an observation balloon destroyed, and two aircraft driven down out of control.

Amm was awarded the Distinguished Flying Cross on 3 December 1918. His citation read:

Lieutenant Edgar Oxenham Amm.

"A gallant and dashing airman who has, destroyed four enemy machines and balloon. On 17th September, in company with six other machines, this officer took part in an engagement with seventeen hostile aircraft; eight of these were destroyed, Lieutenant Amm accounting for one."

On 3 June 1919 he was awarded a bar to his Distinguished Flying Cross in recognition of his "distinguished services rendered during the war", and on 15 July 1919 was granted unrestricted permission to wear the Croix de guerre conferred on him by the King of the Belgians.

Amm declined an opportunity to return home on the first flight ever from England to South Africa, citing a promise to his father to never fly again. After he returned home, he farmed.

=== List of aerial victories ===
Combat record
No.	Date/time	Aircraft/ Serial no.	Opponent	Result	Location
1	12 August 1918 @ 1940	S.E.5a (D6964)	Fokker D.VII	Destroyed in flames	South-east of Bailleul, France
2	17 August 1918 @ 0830	S.E.5a (E5974)	Hannover C	Destroyed	East of Estaires, France
3	18 August 1918 @ 1752	S.E.5a (E5974)	Halberstadt C	Destroyed	South-east of Bailleul, France
4	16 September 1918 @ 0835	S.E.5a (E5974)	Fokker D.VII	Destroyed	Bois Warneton, France
5	29 September 1918 @ 1000	S.E.5a (C1135)	Balloon	Destroyed	East of Armentières, France
6	5 October 1918 @ 0855	S.E.5a (C1133)	Fokker Dr.I	Destroyed	North-west of Courtrai, Belgium
7	8 October 1918 @ 1339	S.E.5a (F853)	Fokker D.VII	Out of control	South-east of Roulers, Belgium
8	8 October 1918 @ 1425	S.E.5a (F853)	Fokker D.VII	Destroyed	North of Roulers, Belgium
9	9 November 1918 @ 0945	S.E.5a (C1141)	Fokker D.VII	Out of control	South-east of Audenarde, Belgium
10	9 November 1918 @ 1035	S.E.5a (C1141)	Fokker D.VII	Destroyed in flames	Laerne-Lemberge, Belgium

== Later life ==
Amm married Annie Joyce Peppercorn; they had two daughters and a son, all born in the 1930s. During World War II he joined the South African Air Force, serving as a flying instructor; he then served in Egypt and the Middle East, as well as Italy, with the rank of major. After the war, he sold his farm and founded the South Coast Aviation Company. From there, he moved on to citrus farming, managing Valencia Estates at Letaba. His last known occupation was general manager of Tzaneen Co-operative Citrus Company Ltd., Politsi, Tzaneen, Mpumalanga, South Africa.

== Death ==
Amm died in a nursing home in Johannesburg on 25 March 1953. His death certificate showed him as ten years younger than his actual age.
