= Reginald H. Rusby =

British WWI flying ace (1896–1946)

Reginald Howard Rusby
- Born: September 4, 1896; Moseley, Worcestershire, England
- Died: December 1946 (aged 50)
- Military career
- Allegiance: England
- Branch: Aviation
- Rank: Captain
- Units: No. 22 Squadron RFC, No. 29 Squadron RAF
- Awards: Distinguished Flying Cross

Captain Reginald Howard Rusby DFC (4 September 1896 – December 1946) was a World War I flying ace credited with ten aerial victories.

== Early life and infantry service ==
Reginald Howard Rusby was born on 8 September 1893 in Moseley, Worcestershire, England, but he was a London native. He served originally in the Gloucestershire Regiment in 1916 before transferring to the Royal Flying Corps.

== Aviation service ==
Rusby was appointed Second Lieutenant from Flying Officer Observer on 16 September 1916. However, his seniority dated from 29 September 1916. Rusby began his aviation career as an observer/gunner in two-seater reconnaissance aircraft in No. 22 Squadron RFC. He was officially seconded for duty with the Royal Flying Corps (RFC) on 21 January 1917. He was wounded three days later. However, the wounding did not prevent him from undergoing pilot's training.

Rusby was promoted to Lieutenant (Temporary Captain), dating from 30 April 1917, to remain seconded to the RFC. He was then confirmed as Lieutenant 1 June 1917, but ordered to surrender his Temporary Captaincy. Then he was promoted Captain as of 4 July 1917.

In October 1917, Rusby was transferred to No. 29 Squadron RFC to serve as a flight commander. He gained his first aerial victory in a Nieuport single-seat fighter on 16 December 1917, driving down a German Albatros D.V fighter in the vicinity of Roulers.

Rusby would be lightly wounded on 7 January 1918. Undaunted, he would score twice more with a Nieuport, on 18 February and 23 March; on the latter occasion, he set a German reconnaissance plane on fire.

He was appointed Flight Commander from Flying Officer on 26 March 1918. He also upgraded to a Royal Aircraft Factory SE.5a, which he used for six single victories in May 1918; one of these was a triumph shared with fellow aces Francis James Davies and Charles G. Ross. Rusby's final tally was five enemy planes destroyed (three of which he set afire), two driven down out of control, and one captured.

Rusby was honoured with a Distinguished Flying Cross on 3 August 1918.

== Honours and awards ==
Distinguished Flying Cross

"Capt. Reginald Howard Rusby.

A patrol leader of great enterprise and courage. During the last six weeks he has destroyed five enemy machines, and previously he has destroyed an enemy kite balloon and a two-seater aeroplane." (Supplement to the London Gazette, 3 August 1918)
