= Christoph Gutknecht =

German linguist, author, and voice actor

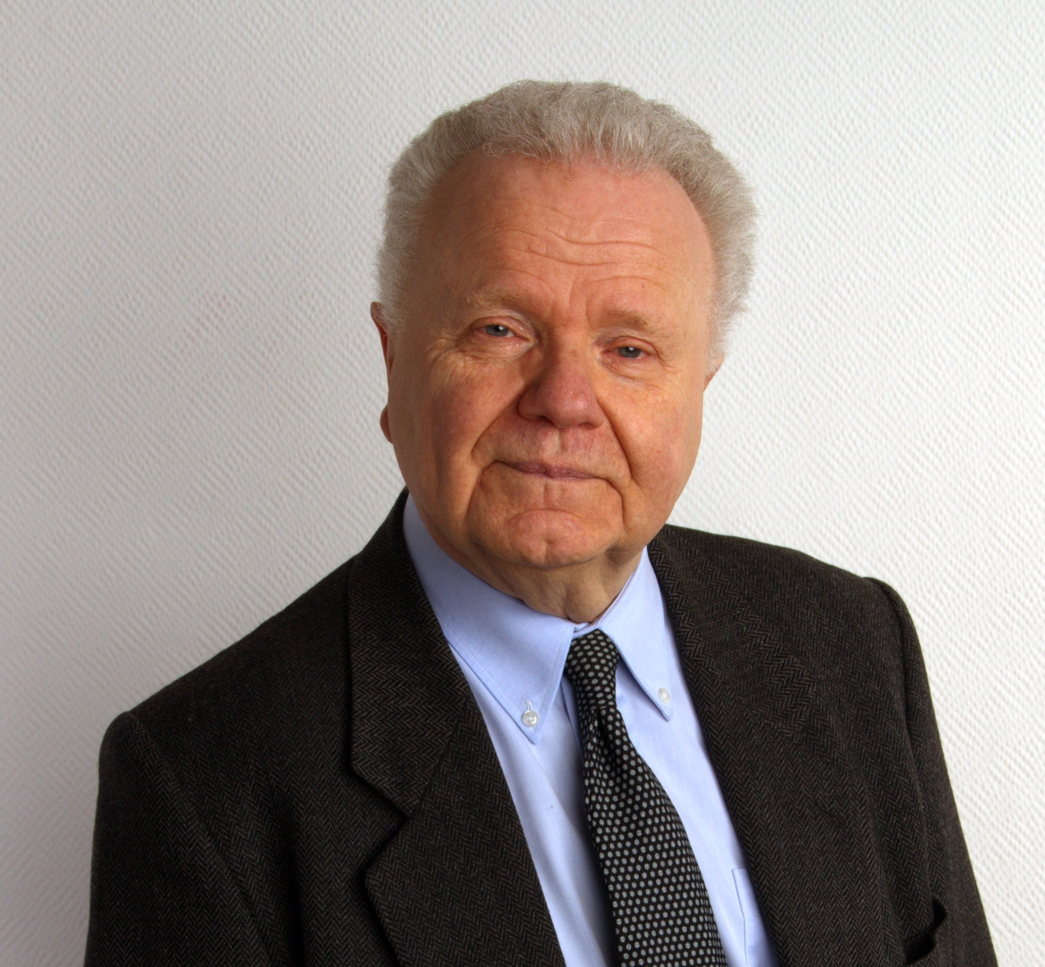
- Born: 24 March 1939 (age 87); Hamburg, Germany

Academic background
- Education: University of Hamburg (PhD)
- Thesis: Die mittelhochdeutsche Versnovelle 'Von zwein koufmannen' des Ruprecht von Würzburg (1966)

Academic work
- Discipline: English studies
- Institutions: University of Hamburg

Christoph Gutknecht (born 24 March 1939) is a German linguist, author, and a voice actor. He was a professor of English studies from 1972 to 2001 at the University of Hamburg.

== Academic career ==
Gutknecht studied German studies, English studies, philosophy, and education at the University of Hamburg, Germany. He received a PhD for his linguistic thesis Die mittelhochdeutsche Versnovelle 'Von zwein koufmannen' des Ruprecht von Würzburg about the work in Middle High German by Ruprecht of Würzburg in 1966.

From 1972 until 2001, Gutknecht was a professor for English studies at the University of Hamburg. He has been specialising in the fields of applied linguistics, Yiddish, and translatology. Gutknecht is a regular contributor to the Jüdische Allgemeine, Germany's largest weekly newspaper of the Jewish community founded in 1946, with almost one hundred articles on the Yiddish language (2019).

== Voice actor ==
Gutknecht has been working as a voice actor since the 1980s by taking part in various audiobooks, audio plays and dubbing of movies. He also spoke the role of "Loghain Mac Tir" in Dragon Age: Origins in 2009.

== Publications (selection) ==
- Christoph Gutknecht: Vorbei an Ächtung und Zensur. Zur Rolle literarischer Anspielungen in erotischem Schrifttum. Geheimsprachen Verlag 2020, ISBN 978-3-947218-10-3.
- Christoph Gutknecht: Gauner, Großkotz, kesse Lola: Deutsch-jiddische Wortgeschichten. be.bra 2016, ISBN 978-3861246961.
- Christoph Gutknecht: Ich mach’s dir mexikanisch. Lauter erotische Wortgeschichten. C. H. Beck 2004, ISBN 978-3406510991.
- Christoph Gutknecht: Lauter blühender Unsinn. Erstaunliche Geschichten von Aberwitz bis Wischiwaschi. C. H. Beck 2002, ISBN 978-3406475573.
- Christoph Gutknecht: Lauter spitze Zungen. Geflügelte Worte und ihre Geschichte. C. H. Beck 1996, ISBN 978-3406459658.
- Christoph Gutknecht, Lutz J. Rölle: Translating by factors. State University of New York Press 1996, ISBN 9780791429570.
- Christoph Gutknecht: Lauter böhmische Dörfer. Wie die Wörter zu ihrer Bedeutung kamen. C. H. Beck 1995, ISBN 978-3406459894.
- Christoph Gutknecht: Contributions to applied linguistics. Lang 1975, ISBN 9783261017901.
- William J. Barry, Christoph Gutknecht: Practical Englisch phonetics. A programmed course in English pronunciation. Buske 1971, ISBN 9783871180668.
