= Arthur Reed (RAF officer) =

Arthur Eden Reed DFC & bar
- Born: 22 August 1898; Pretoria, South Africa
- Died: 29 June 1937 (aged 38); Durban, South Africa
- Spouse: Beryl Vilinda Reed (Marquiss)
- Military career
- Allegiance: Union of South Africa
- Branch: Royal Flying Corps
- Rank: Lieutenant
- Unit: No. 29 Squadron RAF
- Conflicts: World War I
- Awards: Distinguished Flying Cross and bar

Lieutenant Arthur Eden Reed DFC & bar (22 August 1898 – 29 June 1937) was a South African World War I flying ace accredited with 19 aerial victories.

== Early years ==
=== Childhood and education ===
Reed was born on 22 August 1898 in Pretoria, South Africa, the son of Charles James Bowler Reed, and his wife Maria Pauline Voigt. Brother to Charles Bolingbroke Reed, the eldest of five children, and his three sisters Ethel, Edna, and Phyllis. Reed attended Pretoria Boys High School, along with his brother Charles, where he matriculated in December 1914.

Lieut. A.E. Reed was awarded the D.F.C. and Bar while serving in the R.F.C. He swooped down to close quarters and managed to pick off each of the occupants including a German general and other high-ranking staff officers. The wrecked car with its occupants was found the next day during the British advance. Reed received a personal letter from General Plumer (Herbert Plumer), himself, granting him an immediate award from the D.F.C. Reed subsequently won a bar to the D.F.C.

== Military career ==
He began his service with the army in German East Africa between June 1915 and August 1916. He transferred to the Royal Flying Corps in April 1917. He was posted to duty to fly RAF SE.5as with 29 Squadron in March 1918. His first victory came on 28 May 1918, when he drove a Pfalz D.III down out of control. He scored steadily, including a triple win on 18 August, with his last victory coming on 13 September 1918. He tended to shoot down enemy two-seaters, especially trench strafers; his final victory list included 11 two-seaters, including six ground attack aircraft.

=== No. 29 Squadron RAF ===
Lieutenant Reed joined the 29th Squadron of the Royal Flying Corps in April 1917. He was posted to 29 Squadron in March 1918. Among his compatriots in this squadron were South African Air Aces Thomas Sinclair Harrison, Christoffel Venter. Charles G. Ross (SAAF officer) and Edgar O. Amm. His friends here would call him "Pud". Of his 19 victories, 18 were aircraft and 1 kite balloon, all of which he destroyed between May and September 1918. Eleven aircraft were two-seaters and six of these were trench-staffing Halberstadt CL.II and Hannovers (Hannover CL.II or Hannover CL.III) of the Schutzstaffeln (Protection flights). Reed flew the SE 5/5a aircraft manufactured by Royal Aircraft Factory S.E.5 and claimed his last seven victories in E4000, which was lost on 20 September 1918, after being passed on to Capt. G. C. Ross when Capt. Reed had been sent back to the U.K. to rest. At least five more victories were with his SE 5a machine C1942. He returned to the squadron in 1919, when the squadron was based in Bickendorf, Germany.

=== Aerial victories ===
Between 29 May 1918 and 13 September 1918 Lieutenant Reed had nineteen aerial victories accredited to him.

=== Honors and awards ===
- 1 November 1918 – Lieutenant Reed is appointed a Distinguished Flying Cross
- 29 November 1918 – Lieutenant Reed is appointed a Bar to his Distinguished Flying Cross

== Death ==
Reed died young of bronchopneumonia after a seven-day illness, at the Railwaymens' Nursing Home in Entabeni, Durban, South Africa.

== Citations ==
- "World War I Aces of South Africa". The Aerodrome.
- "London Gazette, 1 November 1918 (30989/12971)".
- "London Gazette, 29 November 1918 (31046/14317)".

=== Bibliography ===
- Franks, Norman (2007). SE 5/5a Aces of World War I. Oxford: Osprey Publishing. ISBN 978-1-84603-180-9.
- Robinson, Bruce (1959). SE Air Aces of the 1914-1918 War. Letchworth: Harleyford Publications Ltd. ISBN 978-0-81686-350-1.
