= Edgar G. Davies =

Edgar George Davies
- Born: 4 November 1898; Islington, London, England
- Died: 6 February 1919 (aged 20); Germany
- Military career
- Allegiance: United Kingdom
- Branch: Infantry, aviation
- Rank: Lieutenant
- Units: Queen's Westminsters, No. 29 Squadron RAF
- Awards: Distinguished Flying Cross, Belgian Croix de guerre

Lieutenant Edgar George Davies DFC* (4 November 1898 – 6 February 1919) was a British World War I flying ace credited with ten aerial victories.

== Early life ==
Edgar George Davies was born on 4 November 1898 in London, England, in either Tufnell Park or Islington. (Note: These neighborhoods are about three kilometers from one another, according to Google Map.) He was working as a butcher when he enlisted in the Royal Field Artillery as a driver.

== First World War service ==
Davies left school to join the Queen's Westminsters. From there, he transferred into the Royal Flying Corps (RFC) on 4 November 1917. He qualified as a pilot at the Grahame-White School on their proprietary airplanes, receiving his pilot's certificate on 11 May 1918. He was assigned to No. 29 Squadron RAF on 1 September 1918. The first of the nine enemy planes and one observation balloon that he destroyed fell on the 16th, and the last on 10 November, the day before the Armistice.

== Postwar life ==
Davies died in a flying accident while serving in the Army of Occupation in Germany. He tried a high-speed roll over Bickendorf Airfield; his SE.5a shed its wings and he fell to his death.

Two days after his death on 6 February 1919, he was awarded his Distinguished Flying Cross. His Belgian Croix de guerre followed on 15 July 1919.

== Honours and awards ==
Distinguished Flying Cross (DFC)

2nd Lt. Edgar George Davies. (FRANCE)

Bold in attack and skilful in manoeuvre, this officer never hesitates to attack the enemy when opportunity occurs, without regard to disparity in numbers. On 7 October, with three other machines, he attacked seven Fokkers; four of these were destroyed, 2nd Lt. Davies accounting for one. Since 16 September he has to his credit four enemy machines and one kite balloon.
