= Jagdstaffel 43 =

Jasta 43
- Active: 1917–1918
- Country: German Empire
- Branch: Luftstreitkräfte
- Type: Fighter squadron
- Engagements: World War I

Royal Prussian Jagdstaffel 43, commonly abbreviated to Jasta 43, was a "hunting group" (i.e., fighter squadron) of the Luftstreitkräfte, the air arm of the Imperial German Army during World War I. The unit would score over 35 aerial victories during the war, including two observation balloons downed. The squadron's victories came at the expense of six killed in action, five wounded in action, two injured in accidents, and one taken prisoner of war.

== History ==
Jasta 43 was founded on 6 December 1917 at Flieger-Abteilung (Flier Detachment) 4 at Posen. It was operational by 18 December 1917. The squadron began flying combat sorties on 23 January 1918. It scored its first aerial victory circa 9 February 1918. The Jasta operated through the end of the war.

== Commanding officers (Staffelführer) ==
- Wilhelm Flecken
- Adolf Gutknecht: May 1918
- Guido Schobinger: 2 November 1918

== Duty stations ==
- Montingen, near Metz: 21 December 1917
- Morhange: 9 March 1918
- Avelin, France: 3 April 1918
- Gondecourt, France
- Haubourdin, France
- Seclin, France
- Grand Metz
- Cysoing, France
- Berghem, Belgium

== Notable personnel ==
- Josef Raesch
- Adolf Gutknecht
- Ernst Wiehle

== Operations ==
Jasta 43 flew its initial combat missions for Armee-Abteilung A, beginning 21 December 1917. On 2 February 1918, the squadron transferred its support mission to 19 Armee. On 3 April 1918, Jasta 43 was reassigned to fly for 6 Armee.

== Aircraft ==
Jasta 43 is known to have operated Fokker D.VII and Pfalz D.XII fighters.
