= Jack Armand Cunningham =

English World War I flying ace

- Born: 4 December 1890; Liverpool, England
- Died: 3 April 1956 (aged 65); Hoylake, Cheshire, England
- Military career
- Allegiance: United Kingdom
- Branch: British Army; Royal Air Force
- Service years: 1910–1945
- Rank: Lieutenant-Colonel
- Units: Royal Artillery; No. 18 Squadron RFC; No. 6 Squadron RFC; No. 65 Squadron RAF; No. 65 Wing RAF
- Awards: Distinguished Service Order; Distinguished Flying Cross; Legion d'honneur (France); Croix de guerre (France); Order of Leopold (Belgium); Croix de guerre (Belgium)

Lieutenant-Colonel Jack Armand Cunningham, DSO, DFC (4 December 1890 – 3 April 1956) was an English World War I flying ace credited with 10 aerial victories. His victory record was remarkable for being scored over a four-year stretch, using four different types of aircraft. Cunningham continued his lengthy military career until the end of World War II, when he retired.

== World War I ==
Cunningham first served as a second lieutenant in the Royal Field Artillery. He was granted the Royal Aero Club Aviator's Certificate No. 623 at the Bristol School, Brooklands, on 12 September 1913. He was promoted to lieutenant on 23 December 1913. Soon after the outbreak of World War I he was seconded to the Royal Flying Corps, and was appointed a flying officer on 12 September 1914.

On 16 May 1915 Cunningham was appointed a flight commander with the rank of temporary captain. He served in 5 Squadron from 7 July to 18 October 1915 in Warwickshire, England.

After a transfer to 18 Squadron in France, on 28 November 1915 Cunningham and his observer used a Vickers Gunbus to drive down an LVG reconnaissance machine down over La Bassée. On 29 December 1915, Cunningham had switched to a single-seat Bristol Scout to drive down an Aviatik recon plane over Provin. On 5 February 1916, he used an Airco DH.2 to force an Albatros recon machine to land at Carvin.

Effective 15 July 1916, Cunningham was appointed a squadron commander, with the concomitant rank of temporary major. He would not score his next victories until 18 December 1917, when he was apparently commanding 65 Squadron. He became an ace flying a Sopwith Camel fighter to destroy one German Albatros D.V fighter and drive another down out of control.

Cunningham scored again on 5 February 1918, when he destroyed an Albatros D.V over Beythem. On 12 March, he destroyed an Albatros over Westrozebeke, Belgium. Five days later, he destroyed another over Zuidhoek. He destroyed another one east of Démuin, France on 3 April 1918.

On 2 June 1918, Cunningham was promoted to temporary lieutenant colonel while he was assigned as such. The following day, he was awarded the Distinguished Flying Cross in the King's birthday honours.

Cunningham would win one final victory, when he destroyed a German reconnaissance two-seater over the English Channel off the Belgian coast on 3 August 1918 for his tenth win. He was flying with 65 Wing at the time.

== Post World War I ==
On 1 January 1919, Cunningham was awarded the Distinguished Service Order. This honour was followed by others; on 5 April 1919, he was awarded the French Croix de guerre and Chevalier de Legion d'honneur, and in July 1922 he was awarded with the Croix de Chevalier of Order of Leopold and the Croix de Guerre from Belgium.

On 23 April 1919, he gave up both his commission as captain in Royal Regiment of Artillery and as temporary lieutenant colonel in RAF. The same day he was assigned to the General Reserve of Officers (Royal Artillery) with the rank of captain, with seniority from 8 August 1916. He was transferred to the unemployed list of the Royal Air Force on 26 April 1919, retaining the honorary rank of lieutenant colonel.

His activities over the new few years are unrecorded; however, on 8 September 1923 Captain J. A. Cunningham DSO DFC resigned his commission in the Royal Regiment of Artillery, meaning he must have re-enrolled.

The record then lapses for a decade. On 1 September 1933, Cunningham married Ellaline Lydia Joan Macfie at Knutsford. He would not come to notice again until World War II.

== World War II and beyond ==
On 13 August 1939, he was commissioned as a captain in the British Regular Army Reserve; his seniority of rank was set as 14 July 1932, indicating he previously held a captain's commission on that date. The following day he was appointed a temporary General Staff Officer (3rd grade) attached to the Territorial Army.

On 9 April 1945, Major Cunningham was released from the Reserves on account of age; he was allowed the honorary rank of lieutenant colonel.

On 3 April 1956, Jack Armand Cunningham died at Dunloch, Hoylake, Cheshire, England.
