= No. 29 Squadron RAF =

Flying squadron of the Royal Air Force

- Squadron badge
- Active: 1915–1918 (RFC); 1918–1919; 1923–1974; 1975–1998; 2003–present
- Country: United Kingdom
- Branch: Royal Air Force
- Type: Operational conversion unit
- Role: Typhoon training
- Part of: Combat Air Force
- Station: RAF Coningsby
- Mottos: Impiger et Acer (Latin for 'Energetic and keen')
- Aircraft: Eurofighter Typhoon FGR4

Insignia
- Tail badge

- Roundel
- Tail codes: YB (Dec 1938–Sep 1939); RO (Sep 1939–Apr 1951); BA–BZ (1987–present)

No. 29 Squadron is a squadron of the Royal Air Force which is the Typhoon Operational Conversion Unit. Based at RAF Coningsby in Lincolnshire, the squadron is responsible for aircrew training on the Eurofighter Typhoon FGR4. It originally formed as a unit of the Royal Flying Corps in 1915, and is one of the world's oldest fighter squadrons.

== History ==
=== First World War (1915–1919) ===
This unit was first raised as a reserve squadron at Fort Grange, Gosport, initially equipped with the Royal Aircraft Factory B.E.2c, in November 1915. In early 1916 however No. 29 became the fourth squadron to receive the Airco DH.2 "pusher" fighter, and arrived in France on 25 March 1916 – helping to end the Fokker Scourge and establish Allied air superiority in time for the Battle of the Somme.

By late 1916, the DH.2 was outclassed by new German fighters, but No. 29 Squadron kept its pushers until March 1917, when it was re-equipped with the Nieuport 17. These were replaced with later Nieuport types, such as the Nieuport 24bis, as these became available. Due to a shortage of the Royal Aircraft Factory S.E.5a the squadron retained its Nieuports until April 1918. At this time the squadron finally received the S.E.5a, which it retained for the rest of the war.

The award of a Victoria Cross – the highest award for valour "in the face of the enemy" in the British Empire – to Captain James McCudden of No. 29 Squadron was gazetted on 2 April 1918, for McCudden's "conspicuous bravery, exceptional perseverance and a high devotion to duty", between August 1917 and March 1918.

October 1918 was a bitter month for the squadron; an American volunteer, Lieutenant Joseph Patrick Murphy was the first to fall on 8 October and become a prisoner of war. British flying ace Claude Melnot Wilson was next to fall, on 14 October and Guy Wareing was shot down on the 27 October.

After a short period with the army of occupation in Germany, the squadron returned to the UK in August 1919 and was disbanded on 31 December 1919. The squadron ended the war having claimed 385 victories. Apart from those already mentioned, the 26 aces who served with the squadron included:

- Edgar O. Amm
- Norman Brearley
- Sydney Brown
- Edgar G. Davies
- Francis James Davies
- Thomas Sinclair Harrison
- D'Arcy Fowlis Hilton
- Ernest Charles Hoy
- Arthur G. Jones-Williams
- Camille Lagesse
- William Molesworth
- James Dennis Payne
- Arthur Reed
- Charles G. Ross
- Reginald H. Rusby
- Alfred Shepherd
- Christoffel Venter
- Walter Bertram Wood

=== Inter-war years (1920–1938) ===
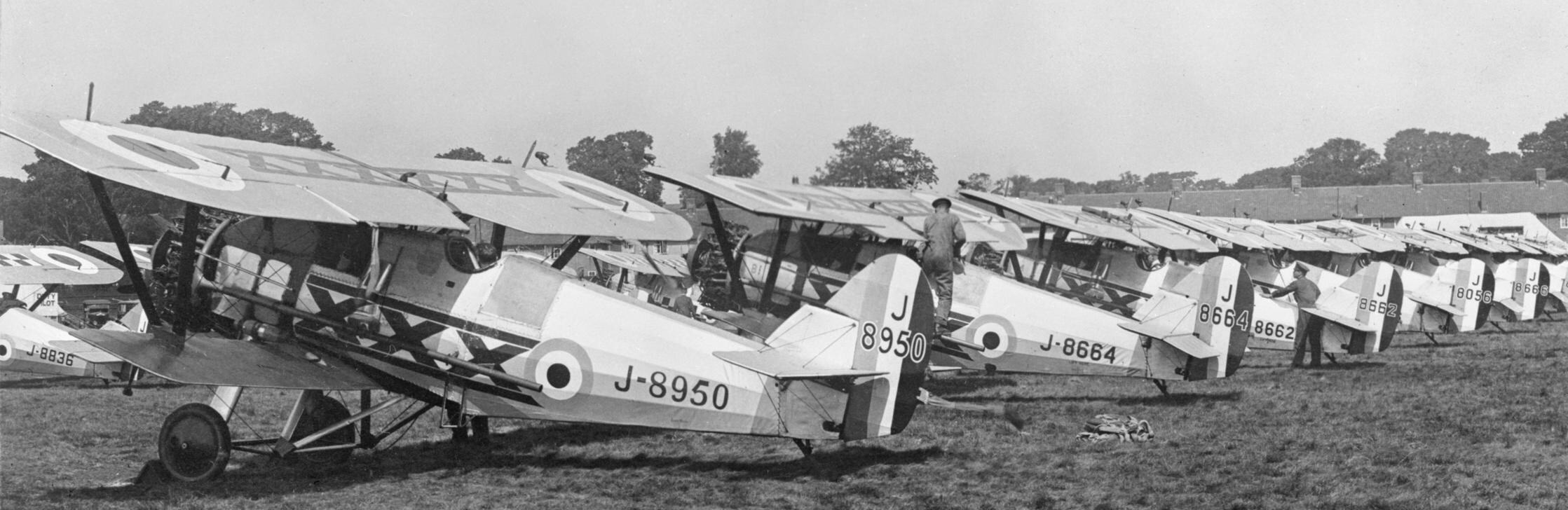
A line-up of No. 29 Squadron Armstrong Whitworth Siskin, in the late 1920s

No. 29 Squadron was reformed on 1 April 1923, initially equipped with Sopwith Snipes. These were replaced by Gloster Grebes in January 1925, In turn, these were replaced by the Armstrong Whitworth Siskin IIIA in March 1928 and Bristol Bulldogs in June 1932. In March 1935, nearly twenty years after it was first raised as a single-seat fighter squadron, the squadron received two-seater Hawker Demons, which it operated until 1938. This included service in Egypt from October 1935 to 1936, during the Abyssinian crisis. As part of the Royal Air Force's modernisation and expansion in the late 1930s, No. 29 Squadron received Bristol Blenheim IF heavy fighters in December 1938.

=== Second World War (1939–1945) ===
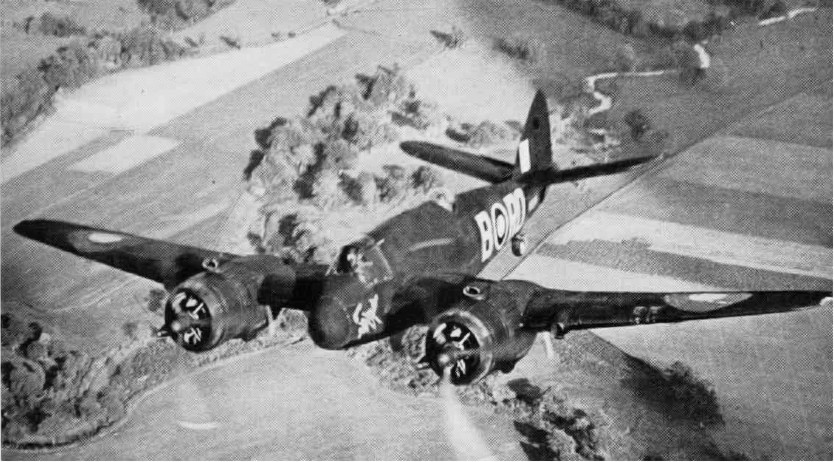
A Bristol Beaufighters Mk.IF of No. 29 Squadron during the Second World War.

No. 29 Squadron began the Second World War with its Blenheims, which at the period operated as day fighters – especially on convoy protection patrols. From June 1940, it became a night fighter squadron, receiving some of the first Bristol Beaufighters in November, though it was February 1941 before the squadron was fully equipped with the new fighter.

Various marks of the de Havilland Mosquito were flown by the squadron from May 1943 culminating in the Mosquito NF.30.

=== Post-war (1946–1990s) ===
During the immediate post-war years the squadron remained a night/all weather fighter unit. The Mosquitoes continued to serve until replaced by the Gloster Meteor NF11 in August 1951.

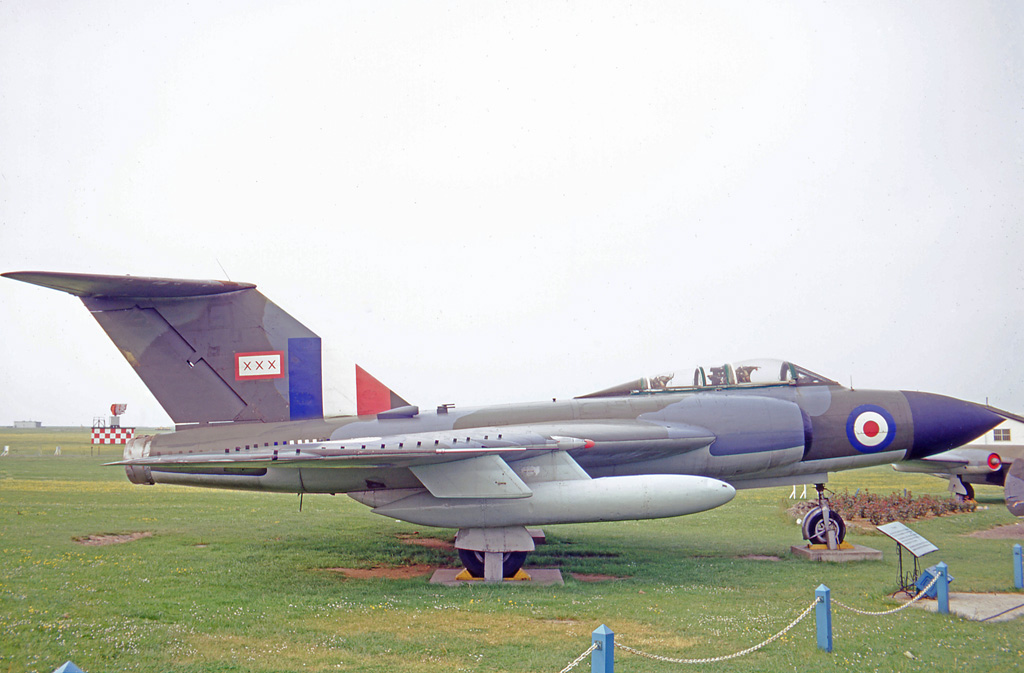
No. 29 Squadron operated the Gloster Javelin FAW.9 between 1957 and 1967

In November 1957, the squadron moved to RAF Acklington in Northumberland where it was re-equipped with Gloster Javelins. In July 1958, it relocated to RAF Leuchars in Fife. In February 1963, the squadron moved to Cyprus and in December 1965 went to Ndola in Zambia for nine months on detachment during the Rhodesian crisis. A single aircraft was written off when all undercarriage legs failed to come down on 2 June 1966.

From May 1967 the squadron operated the English Electric Lightning F.3 and were based at RAF Wattisham near Stowmarket in Suffolk. It remained at Wattisham until December 1974 when it re-equipped with the McDonnell F-4 Phantom and moved to RAF Coningsby in Lincolnshire.

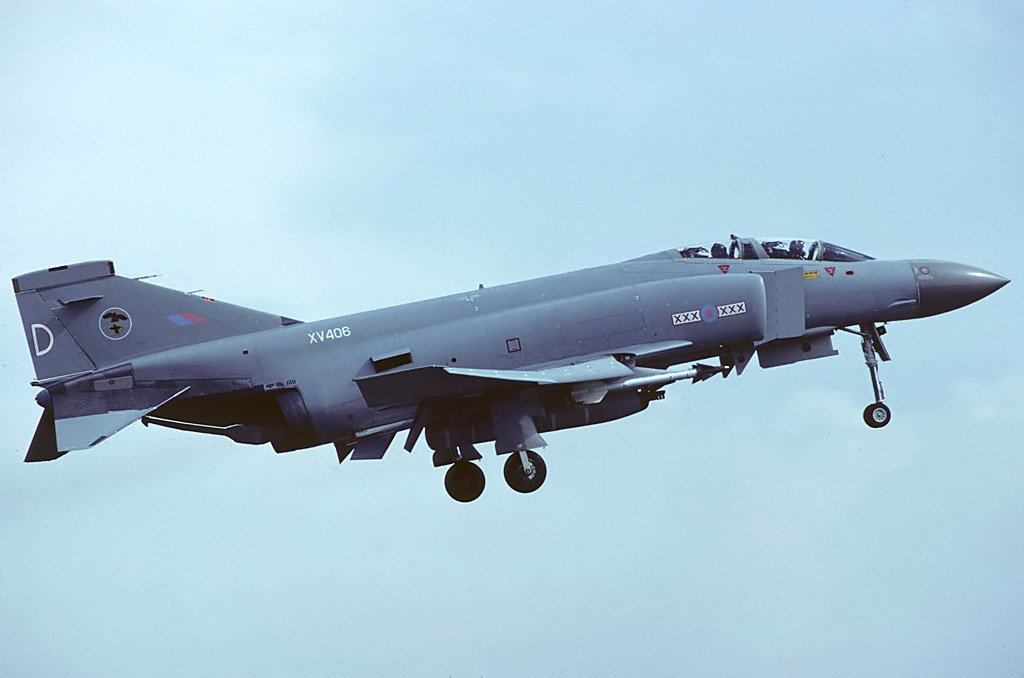
A No. 29 Squadron McDonnell Douglas F-4M Phantom FGR2 in 1983

In May 1982, a detachment of three Phantom FGR2 were deployed to RAF Ascension Island in the South Atlantic during the Falklands War. On completion of repairs to the runway at Port Stanley Airport in the Falkland Islands in August 1982, the squadron deployed ten aircraft south to the islands. The first arriving on 17 October 1982 flown by the then officer commanding Wing Commander Ian Macfadyen.

In 1987, No. 29 Squadron was one of the first RAF units to receive the Panavia Tornado F3, deploying to Saudi Arabia after the Iraqi invasion of Kuwait in August 1990 and thereafter participating in Operation Desert Storm. The squadron flew the Tornado until disbanding in 1998, as part of the Strategic Defence Review.

No. 29 Squadron was reformed in 2003, this time as the Typhoon operational conversion unit.

== Aircraft operated ==
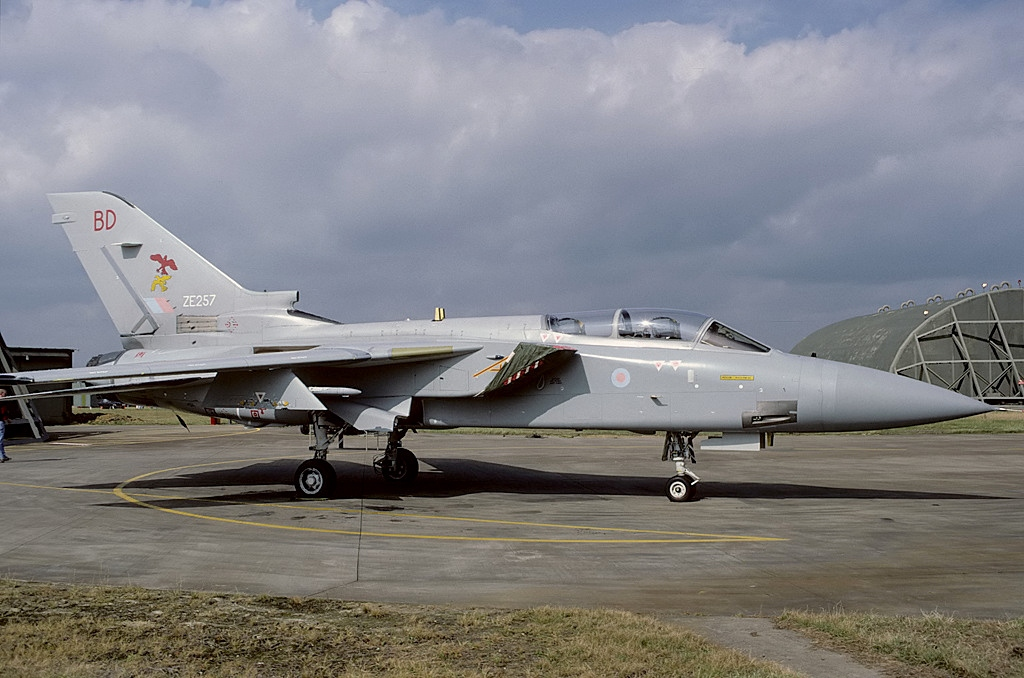
No. 29 Squadron operated the Panavia Tornado F3 between 1987 and 1998

- Royal Aircraft Factory B.E.2c (1915–1916)
- Airco DH.2 (1916–1917)
- Nieuport 17/24bis (1917–1918)
- Royal Aircraft Factory S.E.5a (1918–1919)
- Sopwith Snipe (1923–1925)
- Gloster Grebe (1925–1928)
- Armstrong Whitworth Siskin IIIA (1928–1932)
- Bristol Bulldog (1932–1935)
- Hawker Demon (1935–1938)
- Bristol Blenheim (1939–1940)
- Bristol Beaufighter (1940–1943)
- de Havilland Mosquito (1943–1951)
- Armstrong Whitworth Meteor NF.11 (1951–1958)
- Gloster Javelin FAW.9 (1957–1967)
- English Electric Lightning F.3 (1967–1974)
- McDonnell Douglas Phantom FGR.2 (1974–1987)
- Panavia Tornado F3 (1987–1998)
- Eurofighter Typhoon F2 (2003–present)
- Eurofighter Typhoon FGR4 (2007–present)

== Heritage ==
=== Badge and motto ===
The squadron's badge features an eagle in flight, preying on a buzzard. The eagle, attacking another bird of prey, is symbolic of air combat. The badge was approved by King George VI in April 1937, however the eagle had been used in an earlier version between 1914 and 1918.

The squadron's motto is Impiger et Acer (Latin for 'Energetic and keen').

=== Aircraft markings ===
Since the late 1920s, No. 29 Squadron has used markings with three red X's on its aircraft . Since "XXX" closely resembles the Roman numeral for "29" (XXIX) there is a belief among current squadron personnel that this originated as a misspelling of the Roman numeral.

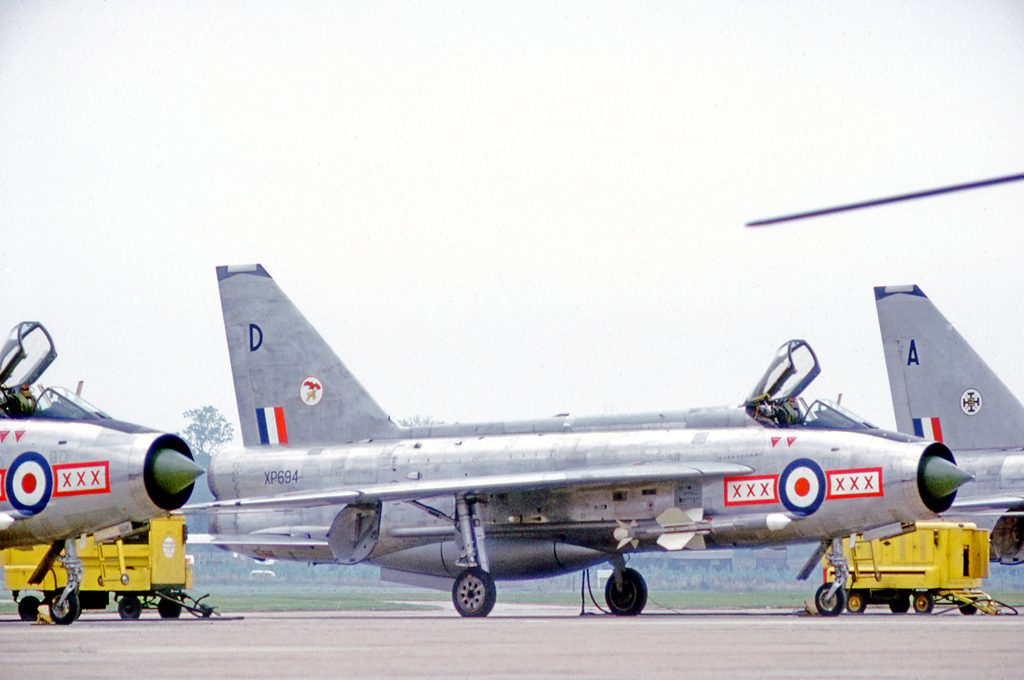
An English Electric Lightning F.3 wearing No. 29 Squadron markings at RAF Wattisham in 1972

Various explanations for the tradition have been suggested, the most common being a misunderstood instruction to ground crew to paint "2 X's in front of the roundel and IX behind it" meaning "X,X,(roundel), and 'IX' or 'one-X'" resulted in "XX(roundel)'one times' X". In fact, the marking was always applied as "XXX(roundel)XXX" or as "XXX(roundel)" on smaller types, such as the Armstrong Whitworth Siskin.

Another theory is that the original adoption of "XXX" for the 1930s squadron marking was not related to Roman numerals, but was a reference to the brewers' mark for "extra strong", frequently applied to kegs of beer, and that it is only a coincidence that this resembles the numeral for "29" (XXIX).

However, as the original squadron markings on the Gloster Grebe consisted of four X's, it is likely both versions above are genuine, and the four X's were just a suitable geometric shape that were shortened to three to fit the smaller space on the Armstrong Whitworth Siskin.

=== Call signs ===
As of March 2025, aircraft operated by No. 29 Squadron use the following peacetime air traffic control call signs within UK airspace: Anarchy, Beaufighter, Cobra, Gunfighter, Riot, Sherman, Triplex and Warlord. The Typhoon display aircraft uses the call sign Dragon for the 2026 display year.

== Battle honours ==
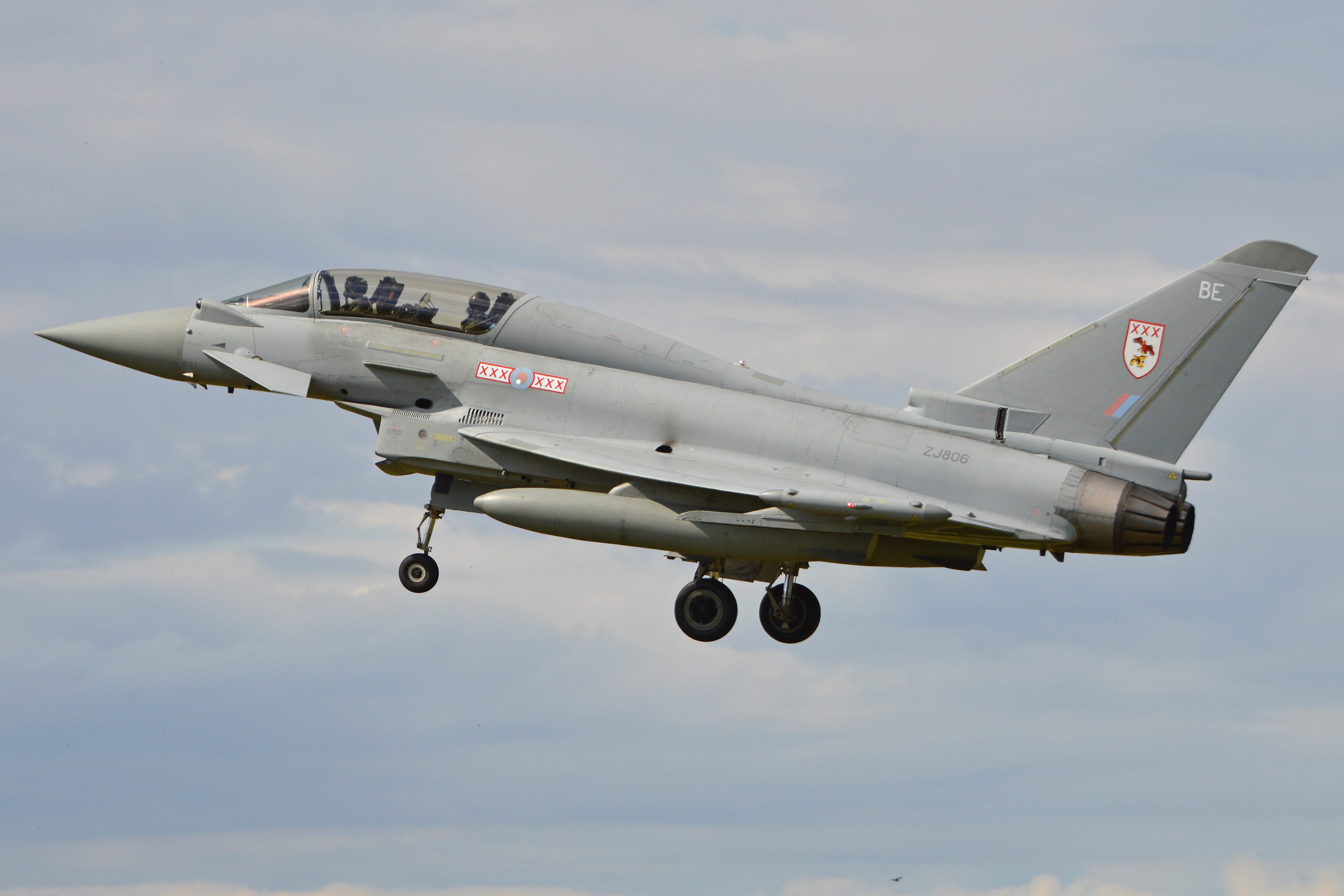
A Eurofighter Typhoon T3 in No. 29 Squadron markings in 2015

No. 29 Squadron has received the following battle honours. Those marked with an asterisk (*) may be emblazoned on the squadron standard.

- Western Front (1916–1918)*
- Somme (1916)*
- Arras (1917)*
- Ypres (1917)*
- Somme (1918)*
- Lys (1918)*
- Channel & North Sea (1939–1940)*
- Battle of Britain (1940)*
- Home Defence (1940–1945)*
- Fortress Europe (1943–1945)
- Normandy (1944)
- France and Germany (1944–1945)*
- Arnhem (1944)
- Afghanistan (2001–2014)

== See also ==
- List of Royal Air Force aircraft squadrons
