= Gribben =

Gribben is a surname of Irish origin (the original Irish form is Ó Gribín).

Notable people with the surname include:

- Alan Gribben, American literary scholar
- Darren Gribben (born 1986), Scottish football player
- Edward Gribben (1888-?), British military aviator
- James H. Gribben (1839-1878), American soldier

== See also ==
- Gribben Head, a promontory in the United Kingdom
