= Montrose Air Station Museum =

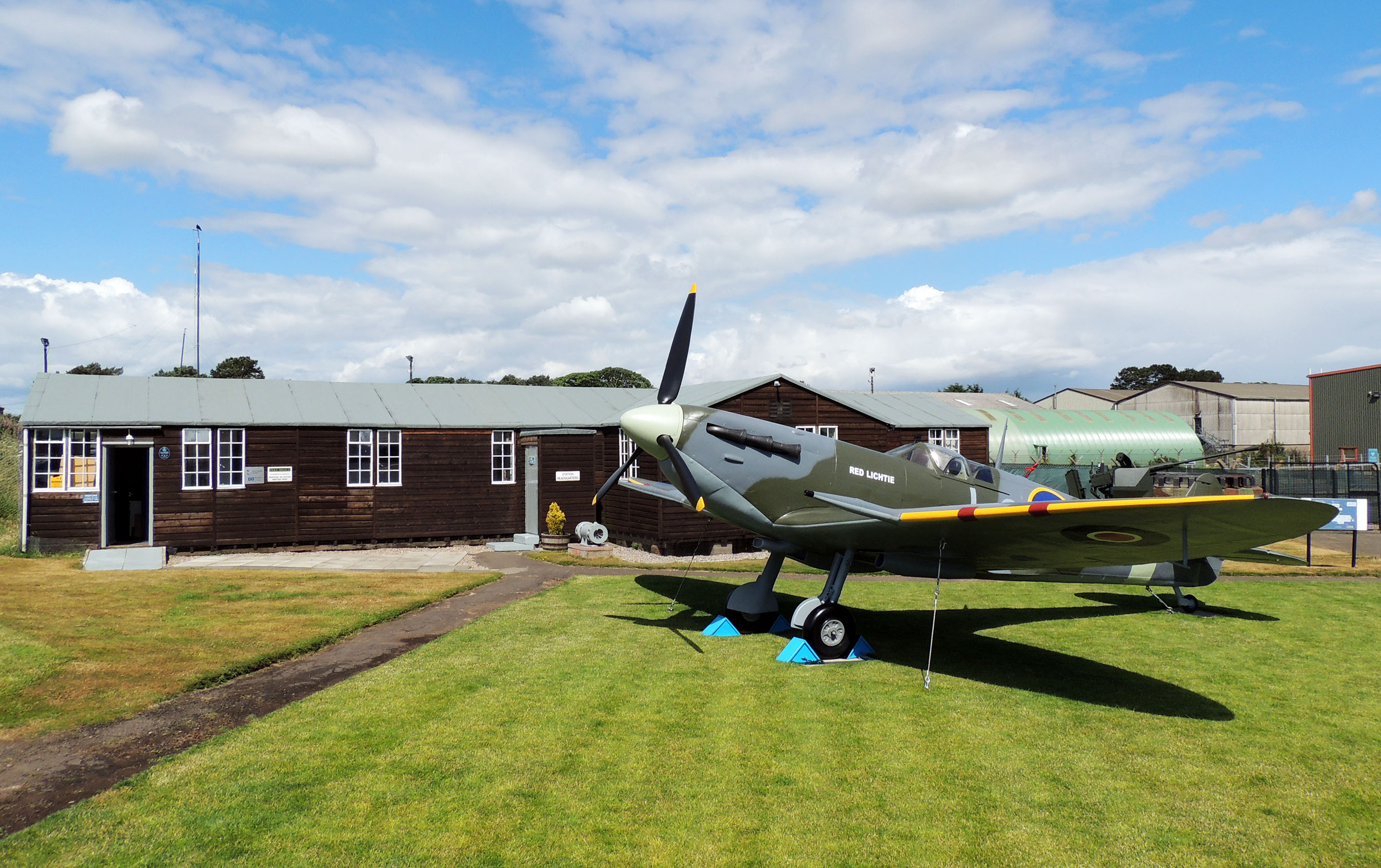

- Location within Scotland
- Established: 1983
- Location: Montrose, Angus
- Coordinates: 56.72600°N 2.46200°W
- Type: Aviation museum
- Website: www.rafmontrose.org.uk

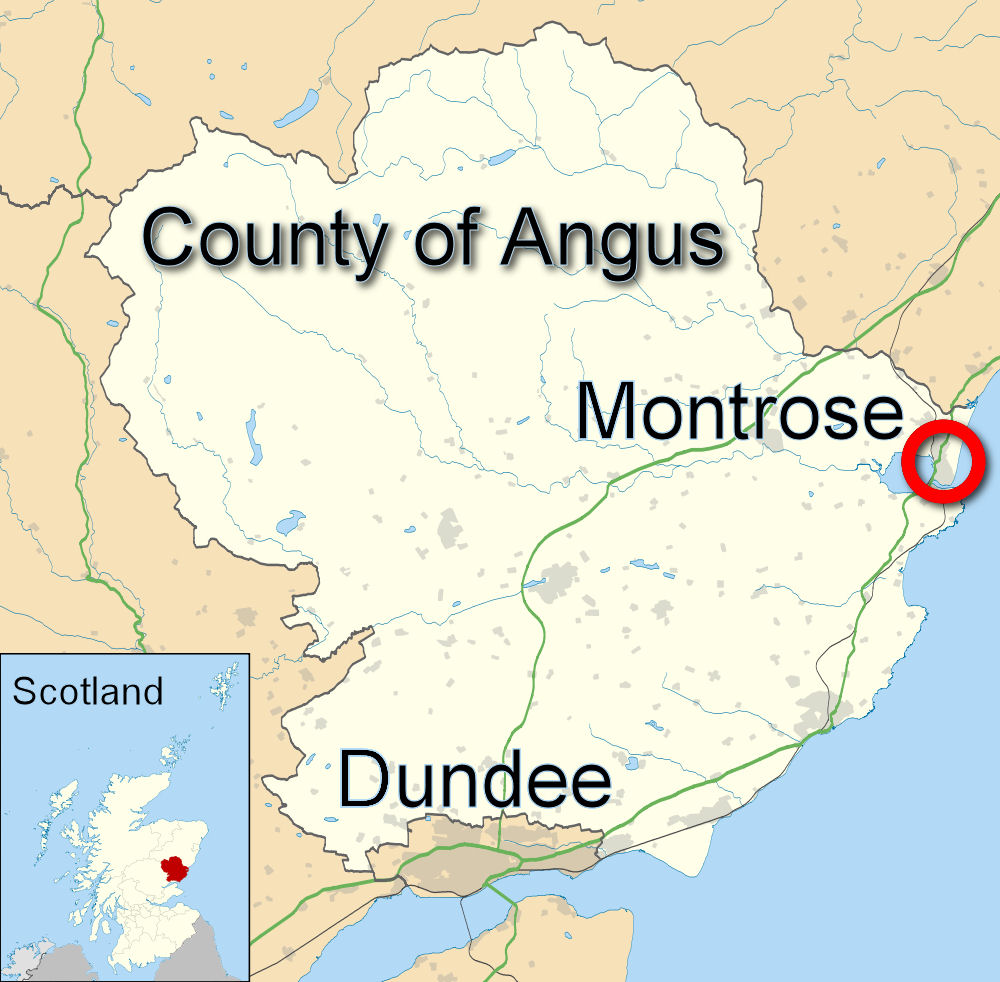
Location of Montrose, Angus, Scotland

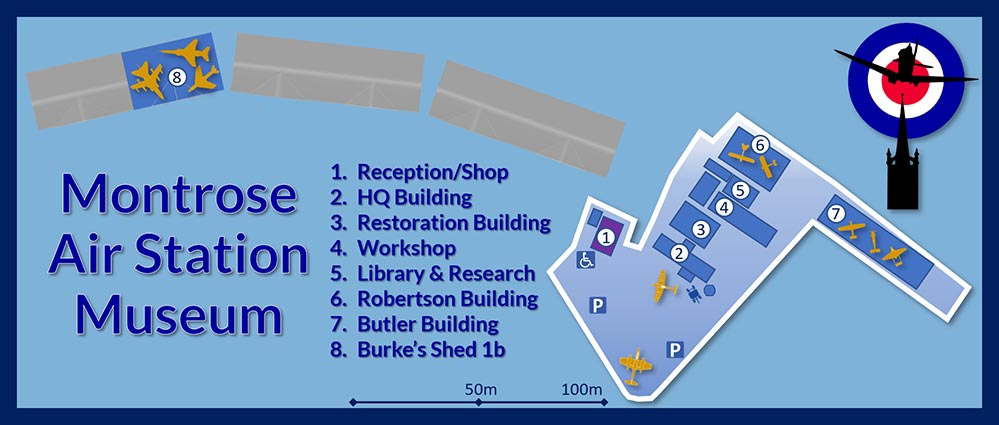
Montrose Air Station Museum Layout 2025

The Montrose Air Station Museum is located to the north of Montrose, Angus, Scotland. Montrose has the distinction of having the first operational military airfield in Great Britain and the Heritage Centre is located on the former airfield.

The Air Station Museum is a Scottish Charitable Incorporated Organisation (SCIO) SC040375. It is self-financing, relying on visitors fees and donations together with grants from local government and the Heritage Lottery Fund. The centre receives no regular financial support from local or national government.

== History ==
The airfield was first opened in 1913 when five aircraft of No.2 Squadron Royal Flying Corps arrived. Montrose became the first operational military airfield in Great Britain and the first military airfield in Scotland.

The air station closed in 1920 but was reopened in 1935 for use in the Second World War. After the war the airfield continued to be used as a maintenance unit until it closed on 4 June 1952.

In 1983 a group of local enthusiasts banded together to ensure that the history of Montrose Air Station would not be forgotten. A local man, Ian McIntosh, established the Montrose Air Station Heritage Trust, now known as the Ian McIntosh Memorial Trust and money was raised by the Montrose Aerodrome Museum Society.

In 1992 the trust purchased the Watch Office and ground which became the Montrose Air Station Museum. Over the years the museum has added more buildings to house its increasing collection of artefacts, memorabilia and models aided by donations, local government grants and the Heritage Lottery Fund.

On 19 May 2012 a memorial stone was unveiled at the air station in remembrance of the units and personnel who were stationed there. The memorial was provided by the Airfields of Britain Conservation Trust.

== Projects ==
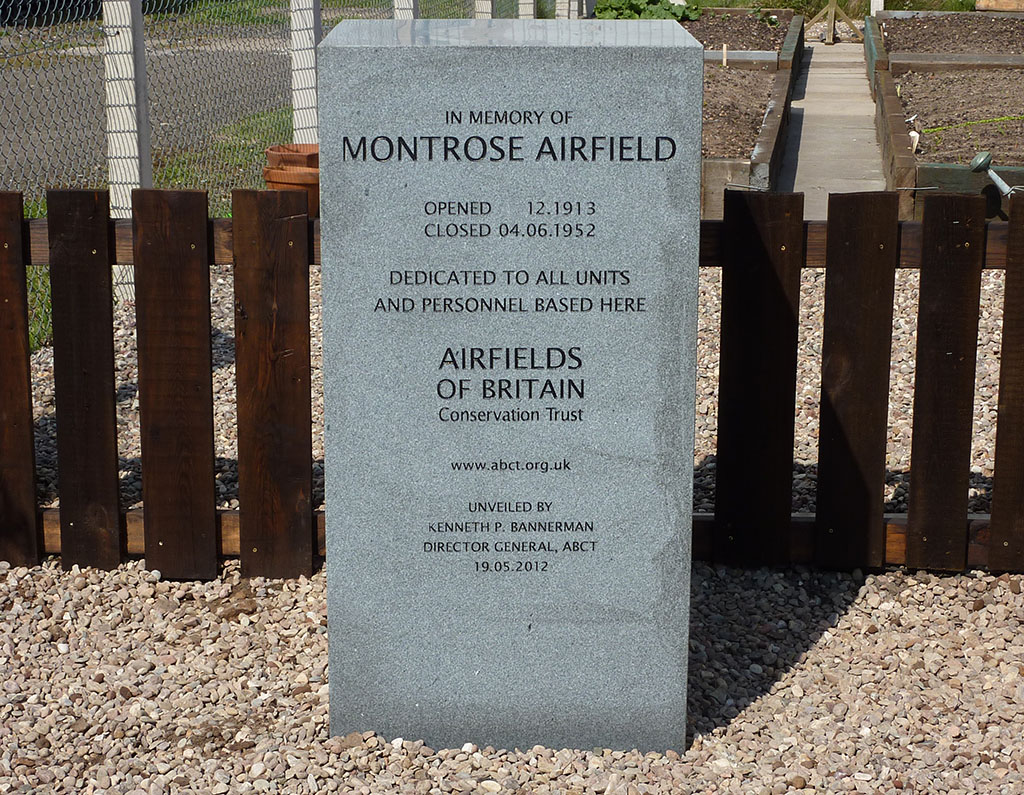
Airfields of Britain Memorial

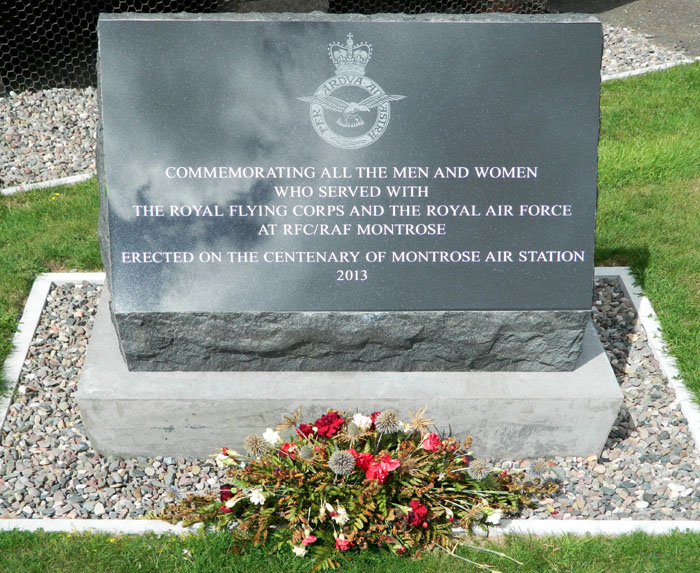
Memorial to the men and women who served at RFC/RAF Montrose

=== Training Pilots for War ===
This project was supported by the Heritage Lottery Fund as well as local benefactors. It commenced in June 2010 and involved extending the Romney Building to create room for new facilities. These included a Link Trainer, computer flight simulator and a learning zone with audio and video resources. It was completed in October 2012.

=== The Spitfire Fund ===
Similar to the wartime Spitfire Funds this was to raise money to purchase a full size replica Spitfire. Additional funding from Angus Council has enabled the purchase of the Spitfire which now sits at the front of the main building. The Aircraft, made by GB Replicas, stands as a monument to the many people who served there during two World Wars. It is in the colours and markings of the 602 Squadron (City of Glasgow) Red Lichtie Spitfire. The original Red Lichtie was purchased in 1942 by the people of Arbroath, Angus after they started a Spitfire fund and raised £5000. On 26 July 2013 HRH Prince Edward, Earl of Wessex visited the Heritage Centre and unveiled the Spitfire and a commemorative stone.

=== First in France 1914 ===
The first pilot to land in France after the declaration of war was Lieutenant H.D. Harvey-Kelly of No.2 Squadron RFC Montrose. The project is named after this event. A new building has been erected which will house the centre's artefacts from World War I including the Robertson Cross and the replica Sopwith Camel. They have also constructed a full size replica B.E.2a aircraft and put together a comprehensive exhibition. Also part of this project will involve the production of a Roll of Honour, an 'online' Book of Remembrance for pilots who were killed in accidents whilst flying at Montrose Air Station. The First in France 1914 project is supported by the Heritage Lottery Fund.

== Exhibits ==
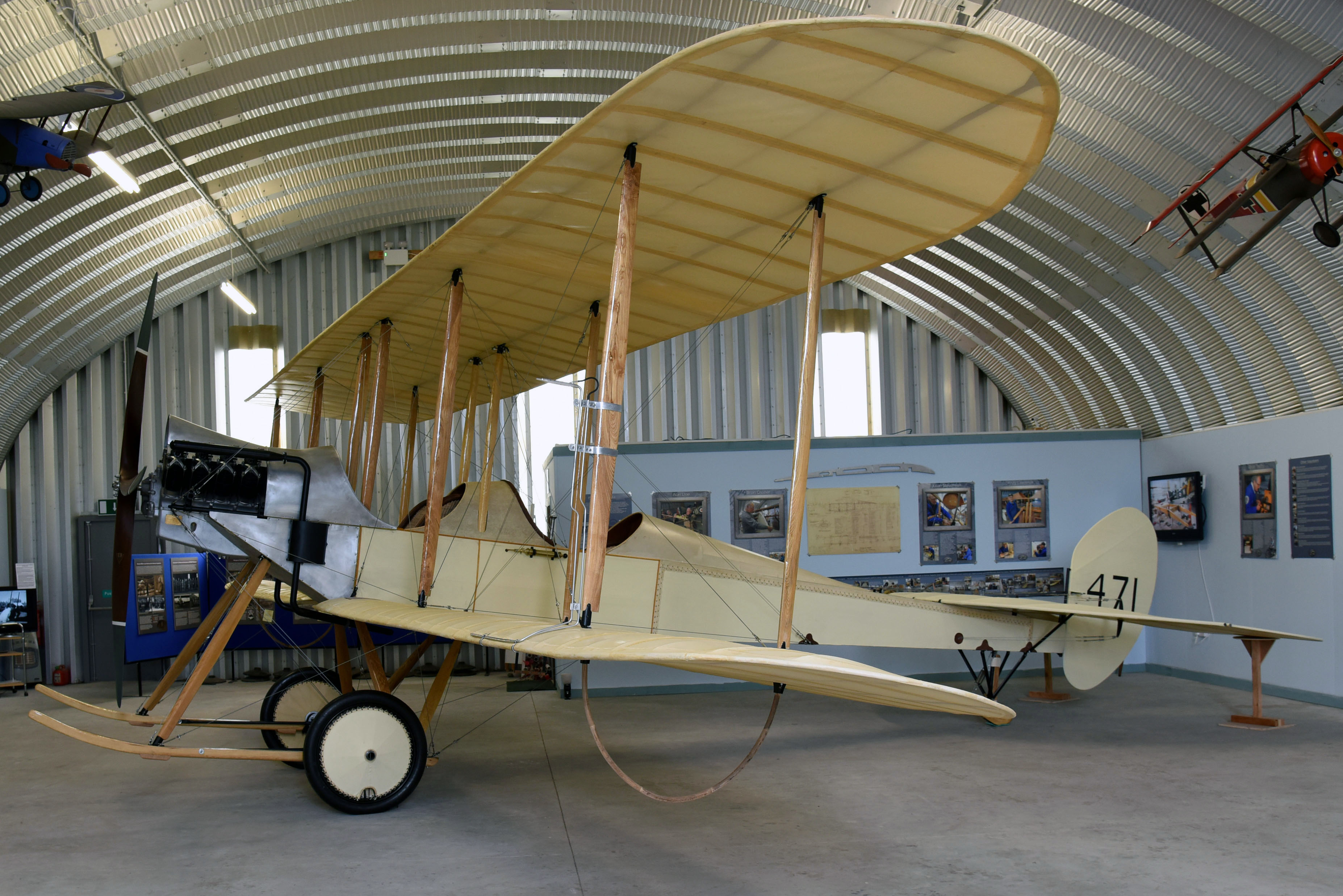
Replica of B.E.2a No.471 built by Heritage Centre volunteers from original plans.

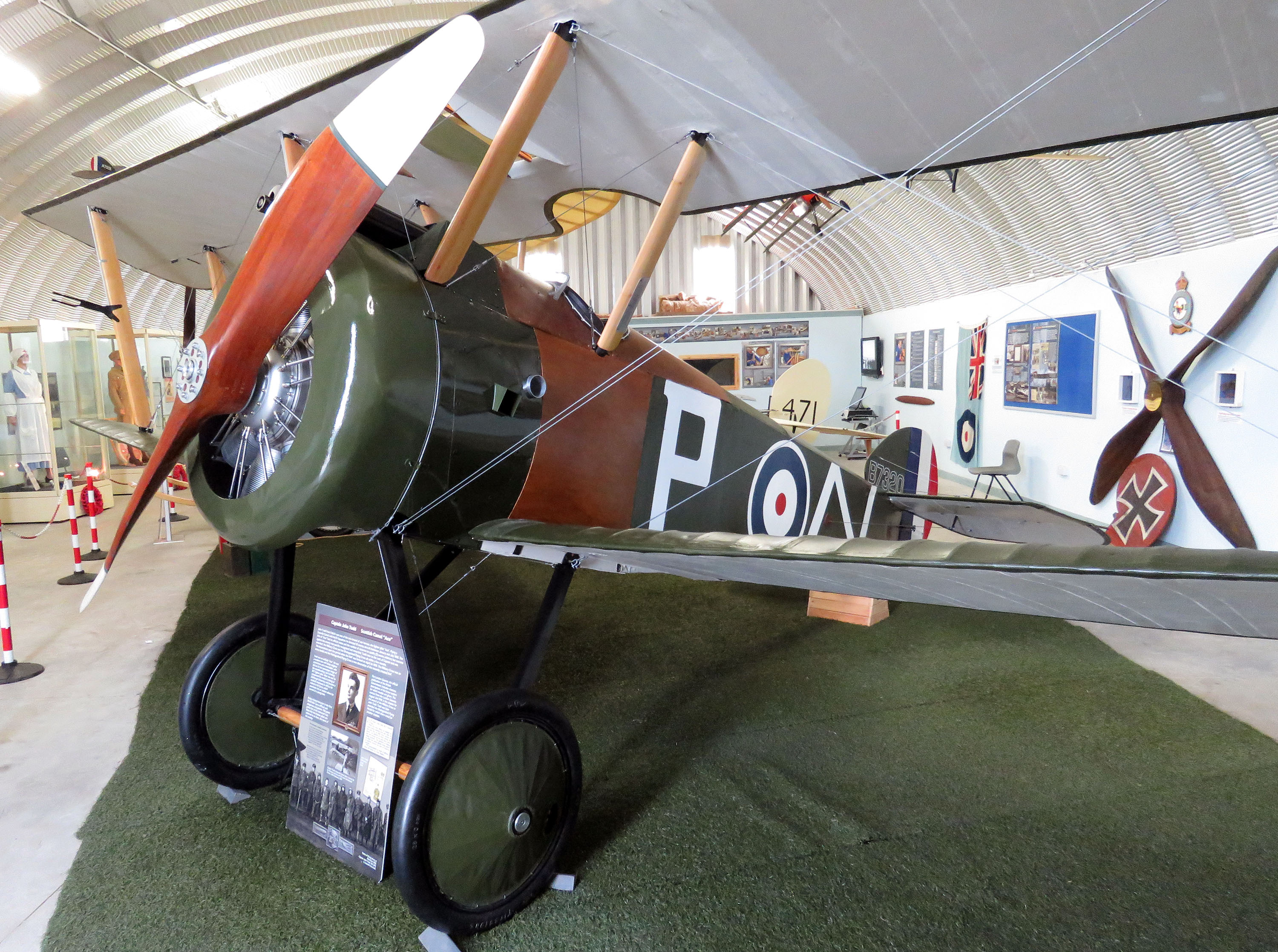
Replica Sopwith Camel B7320

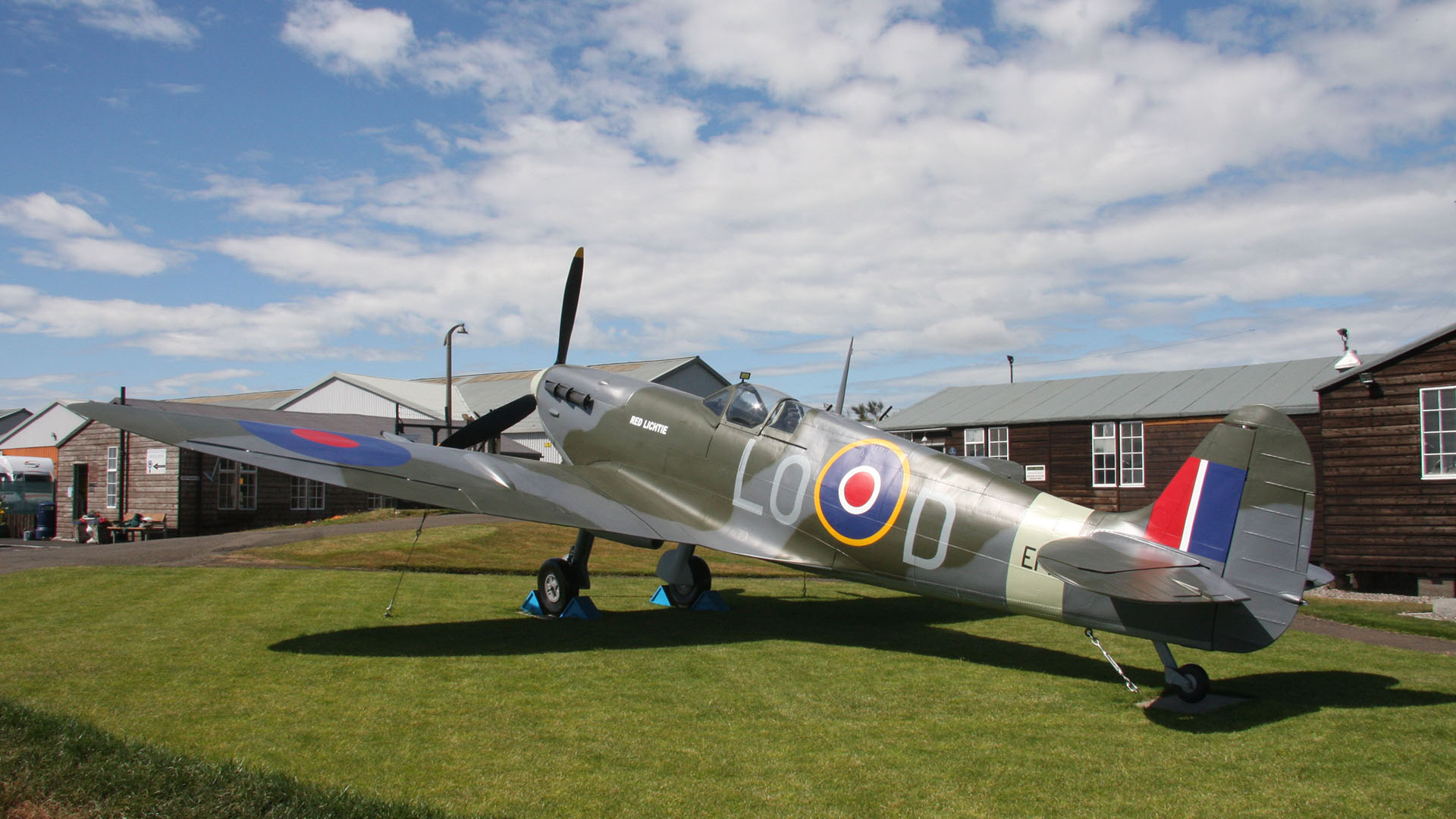
Replica Supermarine Spitfire

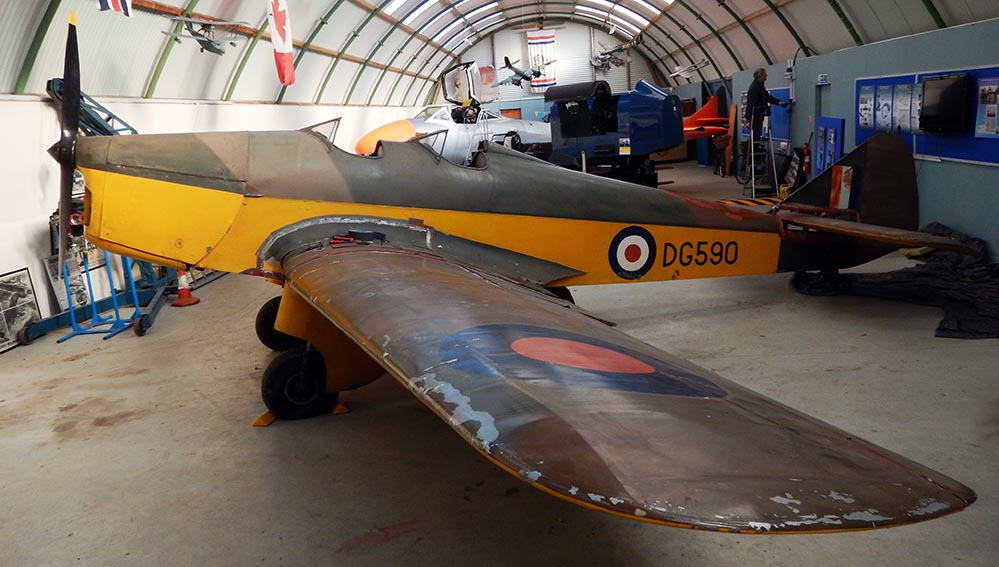
Miles M.2H Hawk Major DG590

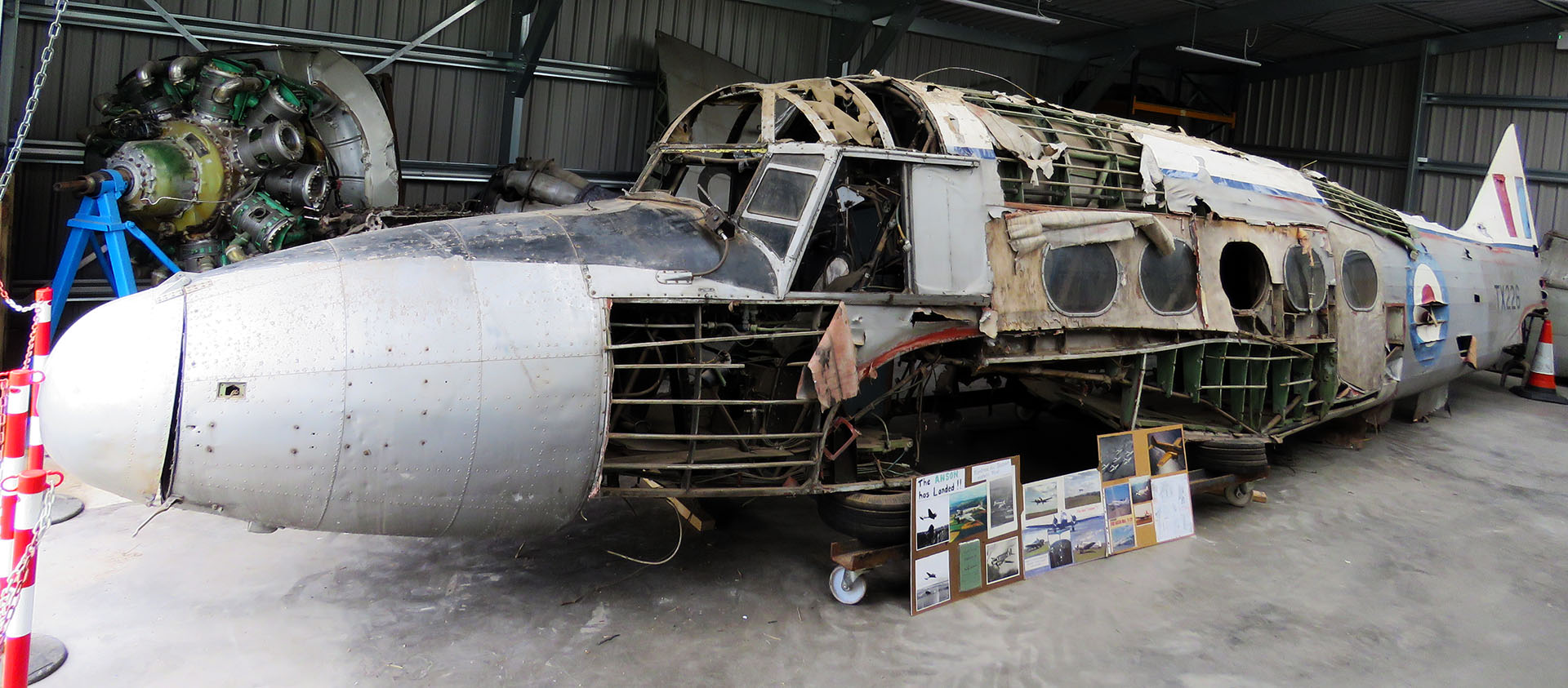
Avro Anson Mk.C19 No.TX266

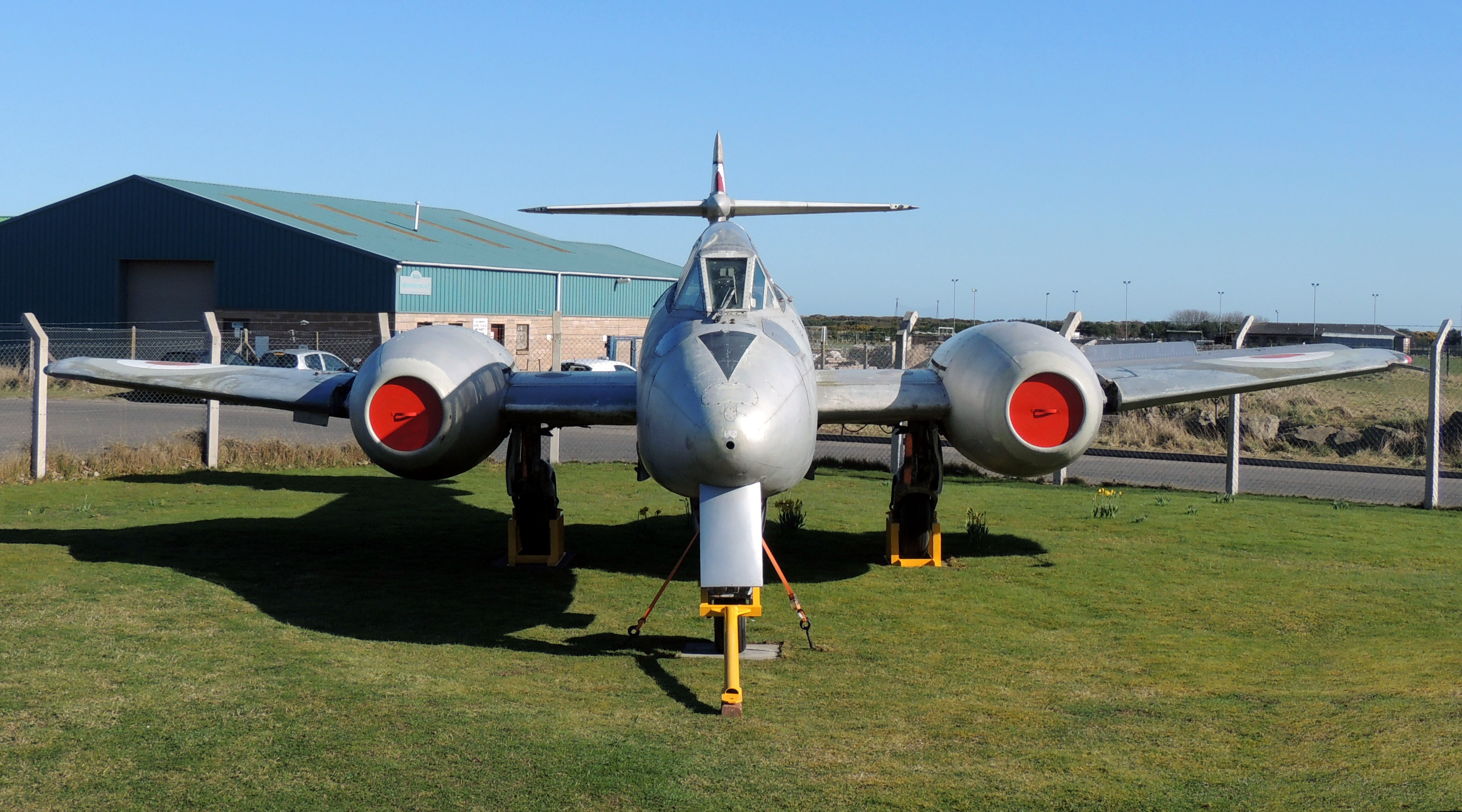
Gloster Meteor T.7 (WF 825)

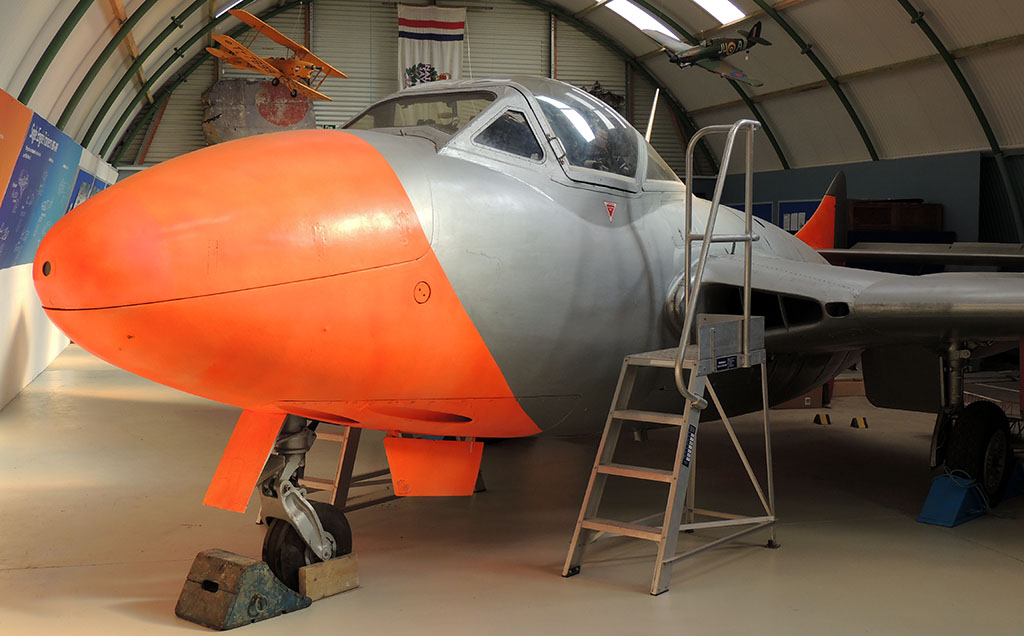
Royal Navy Fleet Air Arm de Havilland Sea Vampire T.22 (XA 109)

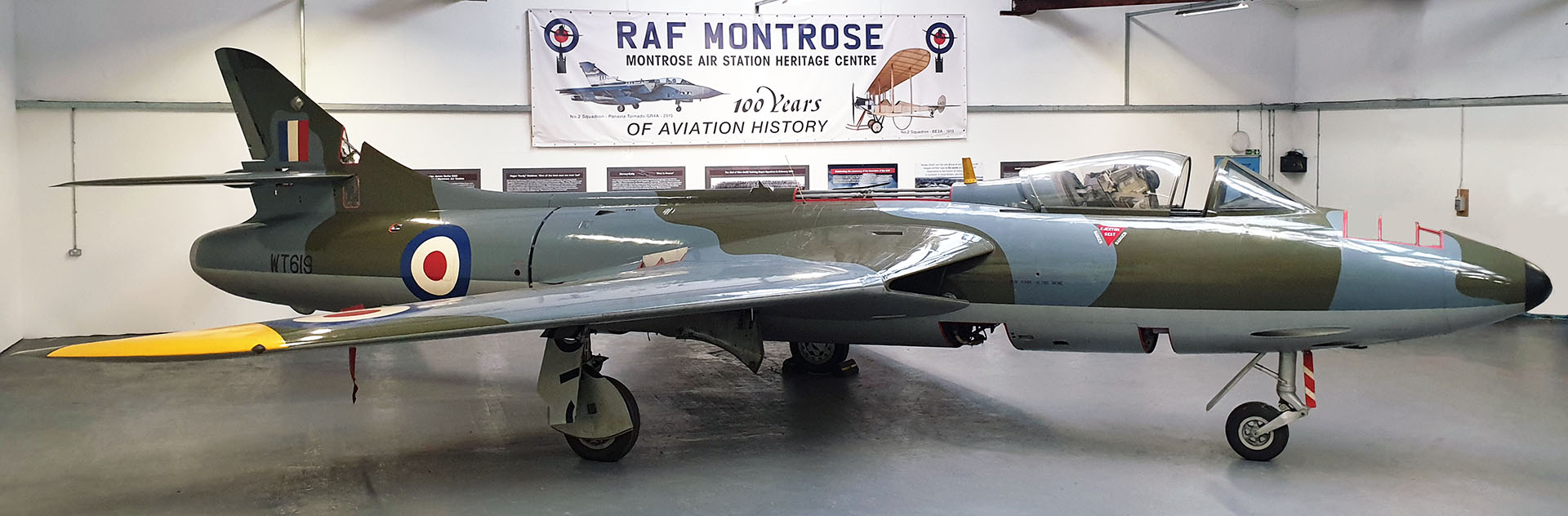
RAF Hawker Hunter F.1 (WT619)

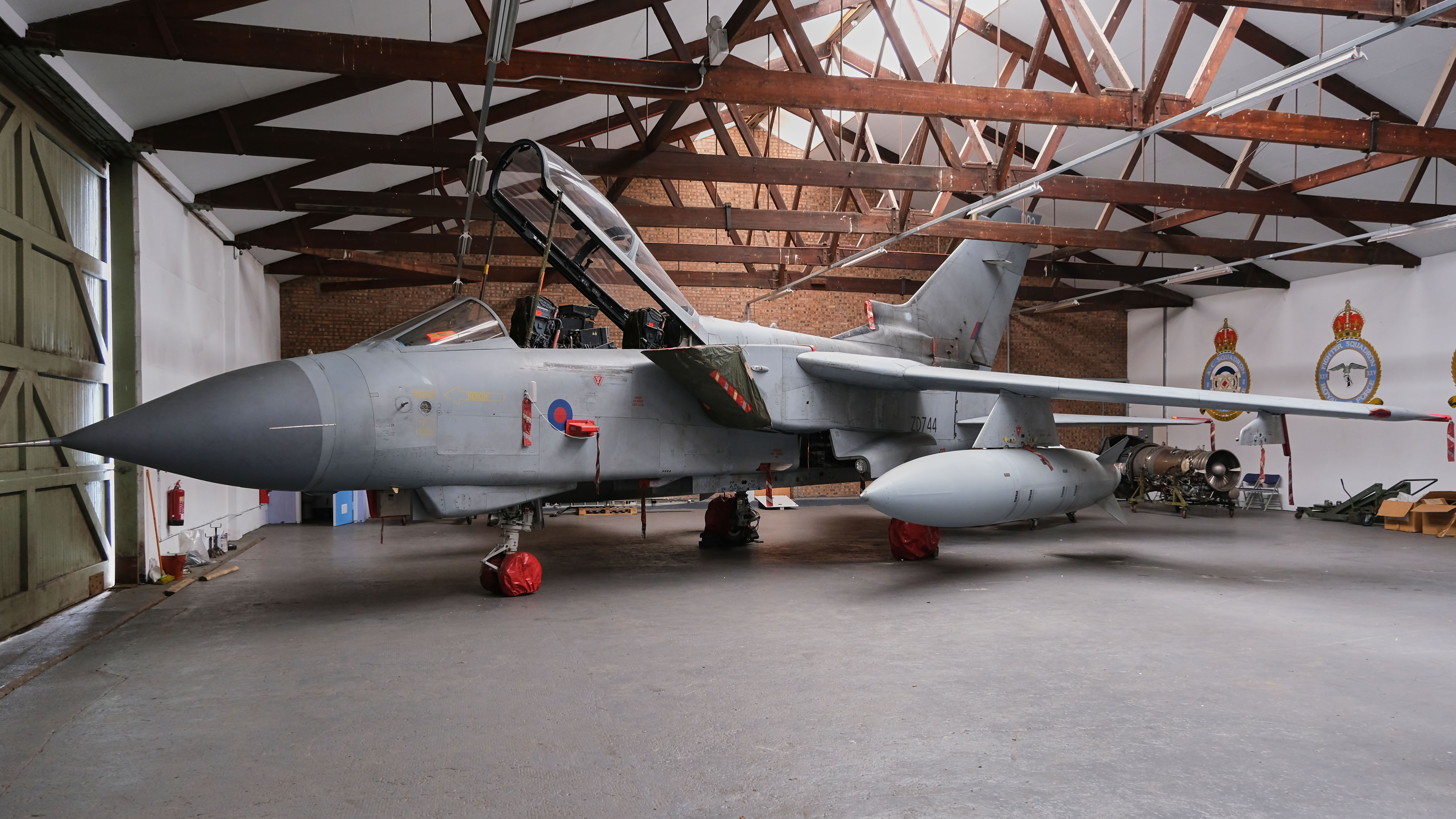
RAF Panavia Tornado GR4 (ZD744)

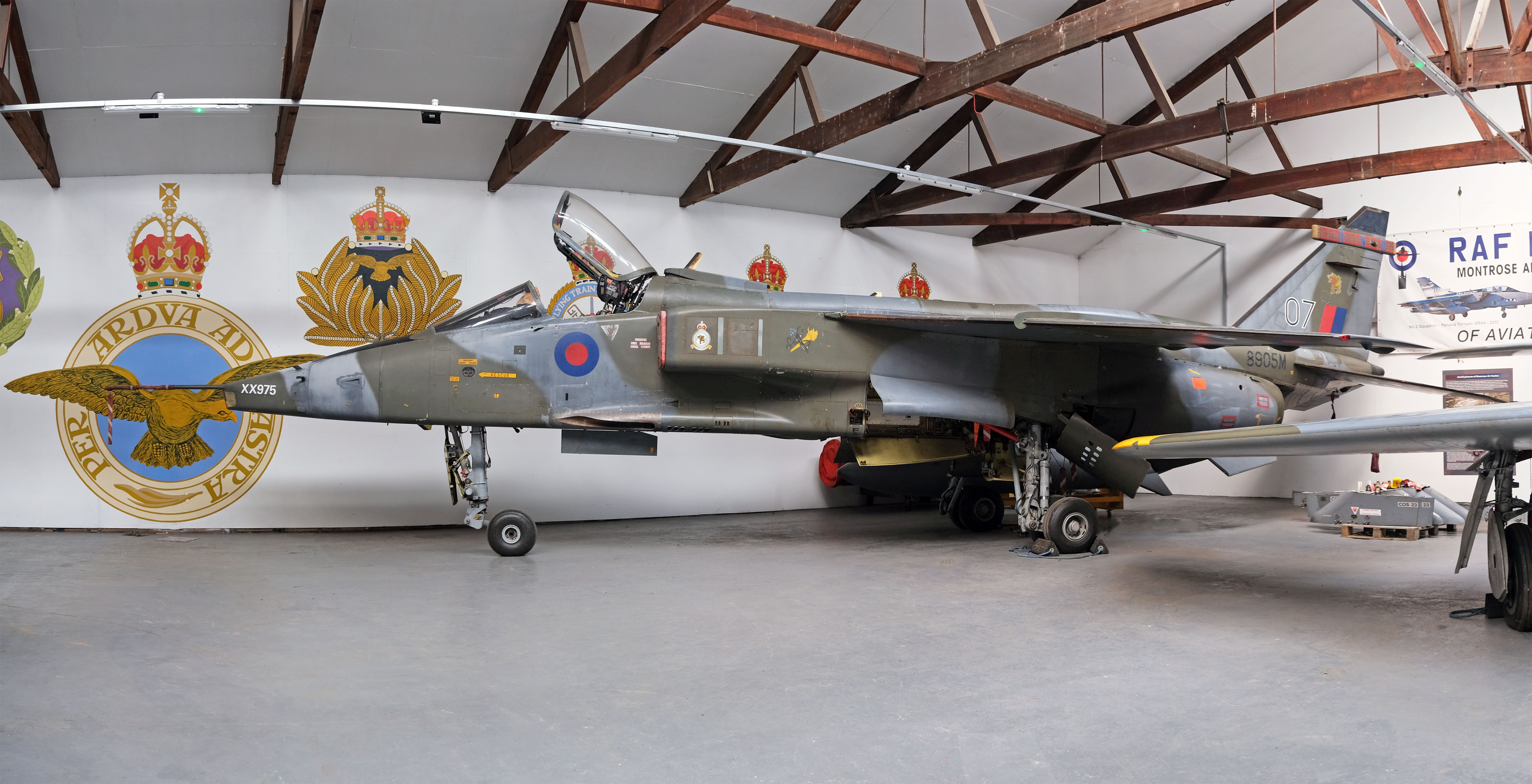
RAF SEPECAT Jaguar GR1 (XX975)

=== Aircraft on display ===
- Royal Aircraft Factory B.E.2a replica representing No.471 of No.2 Squadron RFC as flown by Major Harvey Kelly DSO
- Sopwith Camel F.1 replica representing B7320 of No.70 Squadron RFC as flown by WWI fighter ace Captain John Todd MBE MC DFC
- Miles M.2H Hawk Major (DG590) Civilian Registration was G-ADMW
- Avro Anson Mk.C19 No.TX266 on display whilst under renovation.
- Supermarine Spitfire MkVb full size replica LO-D (EP121) No.602 (City of Glasgow) Squadron RAF
- Gloster Meteor T.7 (WF825) from No.603 (City of Edinburgh) Squadron RAF
- de Havilland Sea Vampire T.22 (XA 109)
- Hawker Hunter F.1 (WT619).
- Panavia Tornado GR4 (ZD744).
- SEPECAT Jaguar GR1 (XX975)
- Royal Aircraft Factory S.E.5a 7/8th scale replica (G-SEVA)

=== Engines on display ===
- Rolls-Royce Merlin aero engine
- Rolls-Royce Derwent jet engine
- Rolls-Royce Spey jet engine
- Turbo-Union RB199 jet engine
- De Havilland Gipsy Queen aero engine
- Bristol Hercules radial engine – No 210016 series 264
- Bristol Hercules radial engine – No 210391 series 264

=== Other items ===
- Link Trainer
- 1941 David Brown Taskmaster World War II Airfield Tractor
- Robertson Cross

== Buildings ==
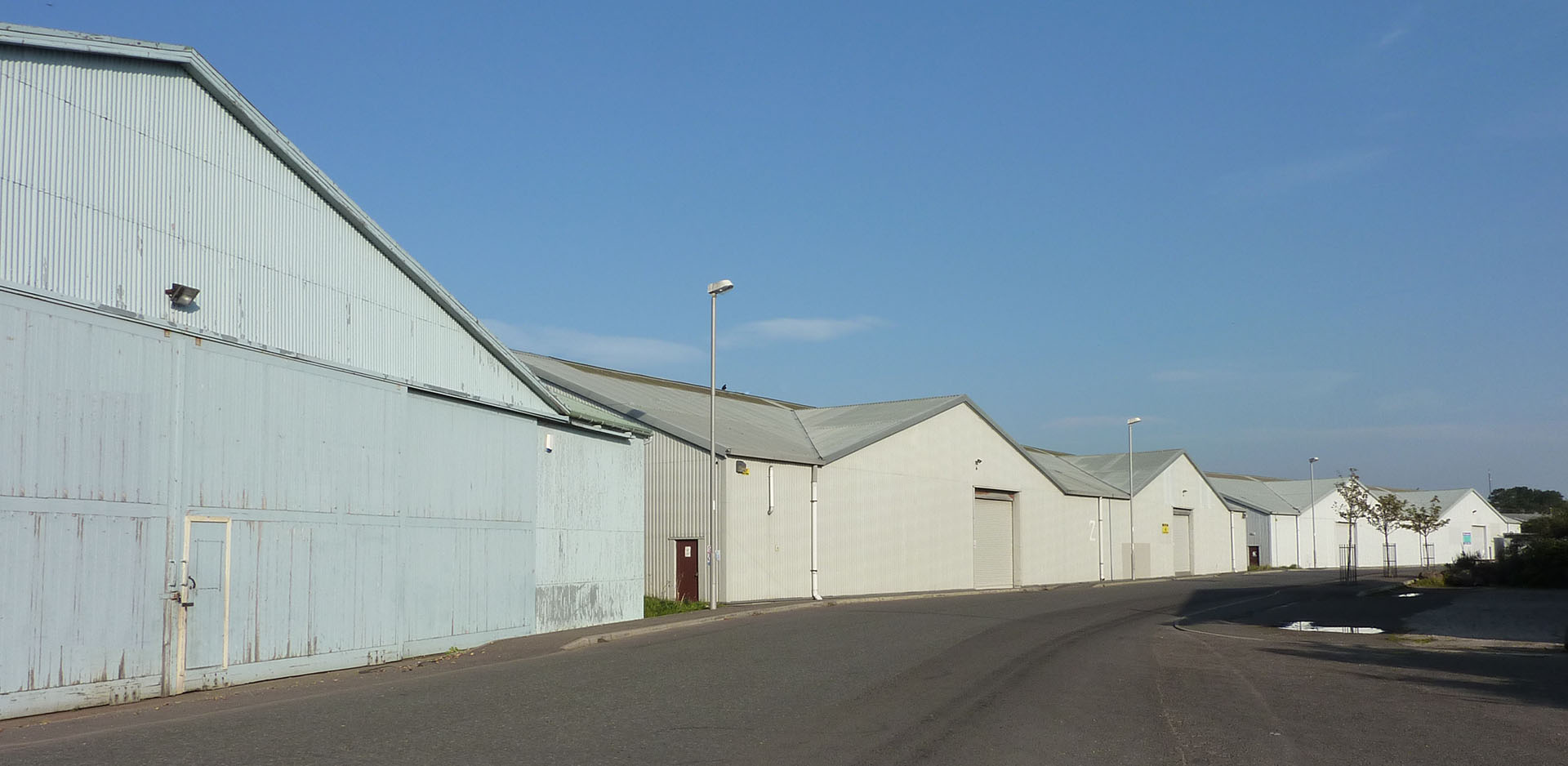
Historic Hangars - Burkes's Sheds date back to 1913

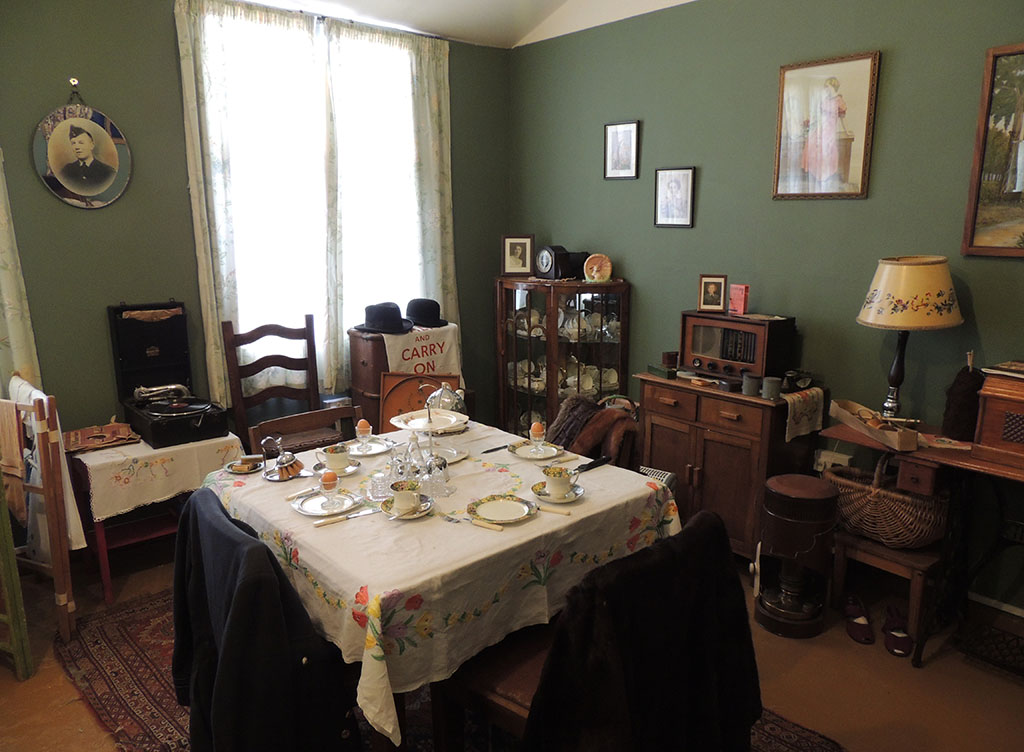
1940's room

=== MT Hut ===
The MT (Mechanised Transport) Hut can be seen in some of the oldest pictures of the air station and dates back to around 1915. After the closure of the air station in 1952 the hut fell into a state of disrepair. In 2009 volunteers started restoring the hut and it was formally reopened on 5 May 2012. The building is a category:C(S) Listed Building Historic Scotland Building ID: 38231

=== HQ Building ===
Built in 1915 this was the former headquarters building of the air station and now holds several exhibitions. The building is a category:C(S) Listed Building Historic Scotland Building ID: 38229

Exhibition Room 1

Formerly the Commanding Officers office, there is a display on the theme of the Home Front during World War II

Exhibition Room 2

Is used for temporary displays.

Exhibition Room 3

The largest display room tells the story of Montrose Air Station from its foundation in 1913 to its closure in 1952 and the people who served there. A new acquisition for 2013 is a large Diorama showing the layout of the airfield in 1940.

Exhibition Room 4

A pilots bedroom in 1940.

=== Wartime Pillbox and Anderson Shelter ===
The pillbox dates from 1949 and was an important part of the defences at Montrose. The Anderson shelter was designed in 1938 by William Paterson and Oscar Carl (Karl) Kerrison in response to a request from the Home Office. It was named after Sir John Anderson, then Lord Privy Seal with special responsibility for preparing air-raid precautions immediately prior to the outbreak of World War II, and it was he who then initiated the development of the shelter. It was widely used by the civilian population during World War II

=== Jack Drummond Workshop and Store ===
This is named after LAC Jack Drummond who was posted to Montrose in 1937. The Nissen hut is used for restoration projects and houses working machinery. For safety reasons it is not open to the public.

=== John Betty Library and Research Centre ===
Named after Squadron Leader John Betty, former Chief Flying Instructor at RAF Montrose, the library houses the largest private collection of aviation books in Scotland and the Heritage Centre's archives. It is accessible to visitors by arrangement and will eventually provide computer access to archives in the future for family history research.

=== David Butler Building ===
This building, a Romney Hut funded by the Heritage Lottery Fund, was named after David Butler who was a founder member of the Heritage Centre. It houses the Miles M.2H Hawk Major, T.22 de Havilland Sea Vampire and link trainer together with a display of aircraft engines. There is also a Pilot Training Display and a Learning Zone for visits from local schools.

=== Lt John Ross Robertson Building ===
The museum's newest building was erected in July 2014 and funded by the Heritage Lottery Fund. It was officially opened by the Lord Lieutenant of Angus, Mrs Georgiana Osborne, on 3 August 2014. The museum's World War I artefacts are on display in the building together with its full-size replica B.E.2a and Sopwith Camel aircraft. The building is named after Lt Robertson who learned to fly at Montrose and was killed in action on his fourth mission 5 months later on 12 May 1917. He was buried by the Germans and the cross they made for his grave is now on display in the building. It stands as a memorial not just for Lt Robertson but to all the people who served at Montrose.

=== Major Burke's Shed 1.b ===
On 14 January 2019 the museum entered into a long-term agreement with Angus Council for use of Major Burke's Shed 1.b. Sheds 1.a and 1.b form the first of three hangars build in late 1913. The hangar contains a Panavia Tornado GR4 (ZD744) as well as a SEPECAT Jaguar GR1 (XX975). and a Hawker Hunter F.1 (WF619).

=== Historic airfield buildings nearby ===
To the immediate south of the museum stand three aircraft hangars which are believed to be the oldest example of their type in the world. The hangars were built at the end of 1913 and first used in early 1914 to house No. 2 Squadron when they moved to the airfield from Upper Dysart. Their design was based on Indian Army Sheds modified by Major Burke to house aircraft and were pre-fabricated in Glasgow before being transported to Montrose. The buildings were constructed of wood with corrugated iron roofs and each one had two gabled openings. The hangars were built in a curve following the path of railway line which used to be at the rear of the buildings.

The hangar farthest away from the museum retains its original cladding. The building is a category:A Listed Building Historic Scotland Building ID: 38228

The other two hangars have had a steel cladding added in 1987-8 and on the 10 August 2018 were relisted from category:B to category:A in recognition of their historical importance Historic Scotland Building ID: 38227

== See also ==
- List of aerospace museums
- RAF Montrose
- Royal Flying Corps
