= Frederic Laurence =

British flying ace (1896–1982)

- Born: 9 March 1896; Marylebone, London, England
- Died: 22 October 1982 (aged 86); Shepway, Kent, England
- Military career
- Allegiance: United Kingdom
- Branch: British Army; Royal Air Force
- Service years: 1915–1945
- Rank: Group Captain
- Units: Worcestershire Regiment; No. 70 Squadron RFC; No. 27 Squadron RAF; No. 480 Flight RAF
- Commands: RAF Southampton; No. 204 Squadron RAF
- Conflicts: First World War; Western Front; Second World War
- Awards: Military Cross

Group Captain Frederic Hope Laurence, MC (9 March 1896 – 22 October 1982) was a British flying ace of the First World War, credited with five aerial victories.

== Early life and background ==
Laurence was born in Marylebone, London, the younger son of Mr. and Mrs. Gerard Laurence, later of Letchworth, Hertfordshire.

== First World War ==
Laurence was commissioned as a second lieutenant in the 6th (Extra Reserve) Battalion, Worcestershire Regiment, being confirmed in his rank on 6 March 1915. He was later seconded to the Royal Flying Corps, being appointed a flying officer on 23 May 1917. He then served as a flight commander in No. 70 Squadron, flying a Sopwith Camel single-seat fighter. He gained his first victory, shared with the rest of his flight, on 28 July 1917 by driving down a German two-seater over Ypres. On 20 October he drove down an Albatros D.V over the Roulers—Menin road, and another west of Roulers the following day. A week later, on 27 October, he scored twice, driving down two more D.Vs over Roulers, one solo and the other shared with Major Nethersole, Lieutenant Goode, and Second Lieutenants Frank Hobson, C. W. Primeau, and Edward Booth. On 26 November he was awarded the Military Cross.

== Inter-war career ==
Laurence remained in the Royal Air Force post-war, being granted a short service commission as a flight lieutenant on 24 October 1919, relinquishing his commission in the 6th Worcesters the same day. On 13 January 1922 his short service commission was cancelled, as he was granted a permanent commission, backdated to October 1919.

After serving at the Boys' Wing at RAF Cranwell, Laurence was transferred to the RAF Depot (Inland Area) as a supernumerary officer on 14 November 1922, before being posted to the No. 2 Flying Training School on 23 February 1923. From 1 to 13 September 1923 he was transferred to the half-pay list, pending embarkation overseas, then travelled to India to serve in No. 27 Squadron from 14 September 1923. In February 1924, in Bombay, he married Marjorie Vera ("Daidie") Rawlinson of Graythwaite Old Hall, Ulverston, Lancashire. On 26 January 1926 Laurence was transferred to RAF Headquarters, India, then to the Aircraft Depot on 1 September 1927, before returning to England.

On 5 March 1928 Laurence was posted to RAF Calshot, joining No. 480 Flight there on 15 August, flying the Supermarine Southampton. On 12 December 1928 he was promoted to squadron leader, taking command of No. 204 (Flying Boat) Squadron at RAF Cattewater on 1 February 1929. On 9 December 1930 he was posted to No. 3 Flying Training School at RAF Grantham, then to the Armament and Gunnery School at RAF Eastchurch on 29 October 1931.

1932 was a particularly active year for Laurence. On 8 February he was sent to the Central Flying School at RAF Wittering for a flying refresher course. Then, after a period on half-pay between 2 and 17 April he was posted to the RAF Depot at RAF Uxbridge while attending a course at Senior Officers' School at Sheerness, and was then attached to the office of the Judge Advocate General from 7 July. Laurence was on half-pay again from 23 to 30 September, before being posted to the Headquarters of RAF Transjordan and Palestine, based in Jerusalem, for personnel staff duties.

Laurence was promoted to wing commander on 1 July 1935, leaving his post at Jerusalem on 23 November 1935, and serving as Senior Personnel Staff Officer at the Headquarters of No. 2 (Bombing) Group at RAF Abingdon from 14 July 1936. On 1 March 1937 he was appointed station commander of RAF Southampton, and on 1 January 1939 was promoted to group captain.

== Second World War and later ==
Laurence served throughout the Second World War, before finally retiring from the RAF on 31 December 1945.

== See also ==
- List of World War I aces credited with 5 victories
- List of World War I flying aces from the British Empire

== Bibliography ==
- Shores, Christopher F.; Franks, Norman & Guest, Russell F. (1990). Above the Trenches: a Complete Record of the Fighter Aces and Units of the British Empire Air Forces 1915–1920. London, UK: Grub Street. ISBN 978-0-948817-19-9.
