= Sydney Liversedge =

English World War I Flying ace

Sydney Tyndall Liversedge
- Born: 15 August 1897; Honley, Yorkshire, England
- Died: 1979 (aged 81–82); Huddersfield, Yorkshire, England
- Military career
- Allegiance: United Kingdom
- Branch: British Army; Royal Air Force
- Service years: 1917–1919
- Rank: Captain
- Unit: No. 70 Squadron RAF
- Conflicts: World War I; Western Front

Captain Sydney Tyndall Liversedge (15 August 1897 – 1979) was an English World War I flying ace credited with 13 aerial victories.

== Biography ==
Liversedge was born in Honley, Kirklees, Yorkshire, the son of James Arthur Liversedge and Ethelinda (née Hirst). His father was a cashier at a woollen mill.

On 19 July 1917 he was commissioned from cadet to temporary second lieutenant (on probation) on the General List of the Royal Flying Corps, and was appointed a flying officer and confirmed in his rank on 31 August.

Liversedge was posted to No. 70 Squadron RFC, flying the Sopwith Camel, in March 1918, which on 1 April, following the merging of the Army's Royal Flying Corps (RFC) and the Royal Naval Air Service (RNAS) to form the Royal Air Force became No. 70 Squadron RAF. Between 6 April and 9 October, during which, on 6 September, he was promoted to acting captain, he claimed victories over 13 German aircraft. He was transferred to the RAF's unemployed list in January 1919. After the war, he worked as a mechanical engineer before he died in Huddersfield, Yorkshire, in 1979.

List of aerial victories
No.	Date/time	Aircraft	Foe	Result	Location	Notes
1	6 April 1918 @ 1545	Sopwith Camel s/n C8220	Albatros C	Driven down out of control	Bray	Shared with Captain Harry Robinson
2	15 May 1918 @ 0730	Sopwith Camel s/n C8266	Pfalz D.III	Driven down out of control	Achiet-le-Petit	Shared with Lieutenant G. C. Morris
3	27 May 1918 @ 1155	Sopwith Camel s/n C1602	LVG C	Set on fire & destroyed	Ribemont	
4	27 June 1918 @ 2030	Sopwith Camel s/n C8268	Albatros D.V	Driven down out of control	East of Albert	
5	@ 2040	Sopwith Camel s/n C8268	Pfalz D.III	Driven down out of control	East of Albert	
6	1 July 1918 @ 0920	Sopwith Camel s/n C8237	Albatros D.V	Driven down out of control	Bray	
7	14 July 1918 @ 0700	Sopwith Camel s/n C8268	Albatros C	Destroyed	East of Bailleul	
8	29 July 1918 @ 1915	Sopwith Camel s/n C8265	Fokker D.VII	Driven down out of control	East of Armentières	
9	2 August 1918 @ 0710	Sopwith Camel s/n C8268	Albatros C	Destroyed	South of Armentières	
10	3 September 1918 @ 0910	Sopwith Camel s/n E7167	Fokker D.VII	Destroyed	South of Roulers	
11	15 September 1918 @ 1815	Sopwith Camel s/n E7167	Fokker D.VII	Driven down out of control	Houthoulst	
12	9 October 1918 @ 0930	Sopwith Camel s/n E7161	LVG C	Destroyed	Inglemunster	
13	@ 0945	Sopwith Camel s/n E7161	Fokker D.VII	Captured	West of Mayerneine	Shared with Lieutenants Oscar Heron, E. A. Copp, A. Webster & Kenneth Watson

== See also ==
- List of World War I aces credited with 11–14 victories
