= John Todd (RAF officer) =

Scottish First World War flying ace

- Born: 12 January 1899; Falkirk, Stirlingshire, Scotland
- Died: 1980 (aged 80–81); St Cyrus, Kincardineshire, Scotland
- Burial place: St Cyrus, Scotland
- Military career
- Allegiance: United Kingdom
- Branch: British Army; Royal Air Force
- Service years: 1917–1919
- Rank: Captain
- Unit: No. 70 Squadron RFC/RAF
- Conflicts: World War I • Western Front
- Awards: Order of the British Empire; Military Cross; Distinguished Flying Cross
- Other work: Missionary doctor

Captain John Todd MBE, MC, DFC (1899–1980) was a Scottish First World War flying ace credited with 18 aerial victories.

== Military service ==
Todd was a medical student at the University of Edinburgh before he joined the Royal Flying Corps as a cadet. He was commissioned as a temporary second lieutenant (on probation) on the General List on 2 August 1917, and was confirmed in his rank on 3 November.

He was posted to No. 70 Squadron RFC to fly the Sopwith Camel single-seat fighter, and scored his first victory on 22 January 1918. Further victories followed, and Todd had brought his score up to five by the end of March, to make him an ace. On 1 April 1918, the Royal Flying Corps was merged with the Royal Naval Air Service to form the Royal Air Force, and his unit became No. 70 Squadron RAF. He gained three more victories by the end of the month, and on 7 May he was appointed a flight commander with the acting rank of captain. As such he gained six more victories in May, three in June, and his 18th and last on 1 July 1918. His final total was ten enemy aircraft destroyed (two shared), seven driven down out of control (one shared), and one captured. Fourteen of them were fighters and four were reconnaissance aircraft.

Todd was posted back to the Home Establishment in Britain to serve as an instructor in July 1918. On 3 August his award of the Distinguished Flying Cross was gazetted, followed by his Military Cross on 16 September. On 5 January 1919 he was transferred to the RAF's unemployed list.

A replica of the F.1 Sopwith Camel B7320 flown by Todd is on permanent display at Montrose Air Station Heritage Centre in Montrose, Angus

=== List of aerial victories ===
Combat record
No.	Date/Time	Aircraft/ Serial No.	Opponent	Result	Location	Notes
1	22 January 1918 @ 1430	Sopwith Camel (B3890)	Albatros D.V	Destroyed	North-East of Houthoulst Forest	Shared with Captain Frank Quigley.
2	28 January 1918 @ 1550	Sopwith Camel (B3890)	Fokker Dr.I	Out of control	North-West of Menen	
3	18 February 1918 @ 1215	Sopwith Camel (B7320)	Albatros D.V	Out of control	Staden	
4	12 March 1918 @ 1245	Sopwith Camel (C8213)	Albatros D.V	Out of control	North of Menen	
5	22 March 1918 @ 1550	Sopwith Camel (C8213)	Fokker Dr.I	Out of control	South-West of Cambrai	
6	22 April 1918 @ 1630	Sopwith Camel (C1670)	Type C	Destroyed	South-East of Wancourt	
7	23 April 1918	Sopwith Camel (C1670)	Two-seater	Destroyed		
8	29 April 1918 @ 1910	Sopwith Camel (C1670)	Type C	Captured	North-East of Querrieu	
9	27 May 1918 @ 1000	Sopwith Camel (C1670)	Albatros D.V	Out of control	Ribemont	Shared with Lieutenants Carl Falkenberg, Hugh Saunders, & V. C. Chapman.
10	27 May 1918 @ 1155	Sopwith Camel (C1670)	LVG C	Destroyed in flames	Ribemont	
11	30 May 1918 @ 1110	Sopwith Camel (C1670)	Albatros D.V	Destroyed in flames	Albert—Bruay	Shared with Lieutenant Sydney Liversedge.
12	30 May 1918 @ 1110	Sopwith Camel (C1670)	Albatros D.V	Destroyed	Albert—Bruay	
13	31 May 1918 @ 1000	Sopwith Camel (C1670)	Albatros D.V	Destroyed	South-East of Albert	
14	31 May 1918 @ 1800	Sopwith Camel (C1670)	Albatros D.V	Destroyed in flames	South-East of Albert	
15	27 June 1918 @ 2045	Sopwith Camel (C1670)	Albatros D.V	Destroyed	½ mi East of Lakes at Albert	
16	30 June 1918 @ 1835–1840	Sopwith Camel (C1670)	Albatros D.V	Out of control	Bray	
17	30 June 1918 @ 1835–1840	Sopwith Camel (C1670)	Fokker Dr.I	Destroyed	South of Bray	
18	1 July 1918 @ 0920	Sopwith Camel (C1670)	Albatros D.V	Out of control	Bray	

== Post-war career ==
After the war Todd returned to his medical studies. After graduating in 1922, he went to Livingstonia, Nyasaland, as a medical missionary. His work was rewarded by being made a Member of the Order of the British Empire in the 1955 Birthday Honours "for medical and missionary services in Northern Rhodesia."

== Awards and citations ==
Distinguished Flying Cross
Lieutenant (Temporary Captain) John Todd, MC. (formerly No. 70 Squadron).

"With four other officers he engaged ten enemy scouts, shooting down one; later, on the same day, he shot down another in flames. In addition to these, during the last two months he has shot down seven enemy machines. His gallantry in leading his flight into action against enemy patrols of superior numbers has been an inspiring example.

Military Cross
Second Lieutenant (Temporary Captain) John Todd, R.A.F.

"For conspicuous gallantry and devotion to duty. During recent operations he destroyed three enemy aircraft, forced one to land in our lines, and drove four down out of control. He did very fine work."

== Bibliography ==
- Franks, Norman (2003). Sopwith Camel Aces of World War I. Oxford, UK: Osprey Publishing. ISBN 978-1-84176-534-1.
