= Frank Granger Quigley =

Canadian flying ace

Frank Quigley
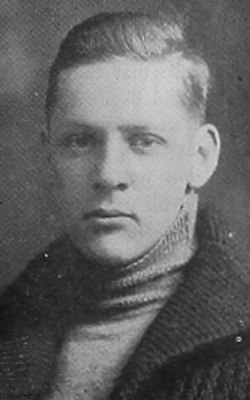
- Photo from 2 December 1914 issue of Queen's (University) Journal.
- Born: 10 July 1894; Toronto, Ontario, Canada
- Died: 20 October 1918 (aged 24); Liverpool, England
- Burial place: Mount Pleasant Cemetery, Toronto
- Military career
- Allegiance: Canada; United Kingdom
- Branch: Canadian Expeditionary Force (1914–17); British Army (1917–18); Royal Air Force (1918)
- Service years: 1914–1918
- Rank: Captain
- Unit: No. 70 Squadron
- Conflicts: First World War
- Awards: Distinguished Service Order; Military Cross & Bar

Francis Granger Quigley, DSO, MC & Bar (10 July 1894 – 20 October 1918) was a Canadian aviator and flying ace of the First World War, who was credited with 33 aerial victories. He was notable for scoring the majority of his victories against German fighter planes.

== Early life and service ==
Quigley was born in Toronto, Canada, on 10 July 1894, the youngest son of Robert John Quigley and Anne Jane Primrose. He attended St. Andrew's College in Aurora, Ontario, and was attending his second year at Queen's University in Kingston when the First World War broke out. He excelled at the sports of football and hockey.

== First World War ==
Quigley enlisted in the Canadian Expeditionary Force on 16 December 1914, and served with the 5th Field Company of the Canadian Army Engineers on the Western Front. In early 1917, he transferred to the Royal Flying Corps (RFC). On 12 September 1917, he was assigned to No. 70 Squadron RFC, flying the Sopwith Camel.

=== Service as a fighter pilot ===
In less than a month, on 10 October, Quigley scored his first victory by shooting down an Albatros D.V in flames, and driving another down out of control. They were the first of 21 victories he scored against the Albatros D.V. Quigley had three victories in October, one in November, and five in December. In recognition of these exploits, Quigley was awarded the Military Cross in February 1918. The citation for the award was published in a supplement to the London Gazette, reading:

For conspicuous gallantry and devotion to duty when engaging hostile .aircraft. On one occasion, while on patrol, he attacked an enemy two-seater, which, after close fighting and skilful manoeuvring, he crashed to the ground. He has within a short period destroyed, or driven down out of control, seven other enemy machines, and on all occasions has displayed high courage and a fine fighting spirit.

In 1918, Quigley scored eight times in January. On 6 January, he, William Fry, and P. G. Kemsley teamed up to shoot down and kill Leutnant Walter von Bülow-Bothkamp, himself an ace with 28 victories. Quigley triumphed once again in February, then 15 times between 8 and 23 March 1918. On 11 March alone, he helped destroy the only observation balloon of his career in the morning, then in the afternoon destroyed a Pfalz D.III and drove two others down out of control. For his work during this time Quigley was awarded a Bar to his Military Cross, the award citation reading:

For conspicuous gallantry and devotion to duty in aerial combats. He destroyed five enemy machines and one balloon, and drove down four enemy machines out of control. He showed splendid courage and initiative.

Quigley victory tally comprised 16 enemy fighter planes destroyed and ten others driven down out of control, four observation planes destroyed and two driven down out of control, as well as an observation balloon destroyed. Quigley was the antithesis of the lone wolf pilot, sharing victories not just with Fry and Kemsley, but with such other aces as Frank Gorringe, George R. Howsam, John Todd, Frank Hobson, Alfred Michael Koch, and Walter M. Carlaw.

=== Instructional appointments and death ===
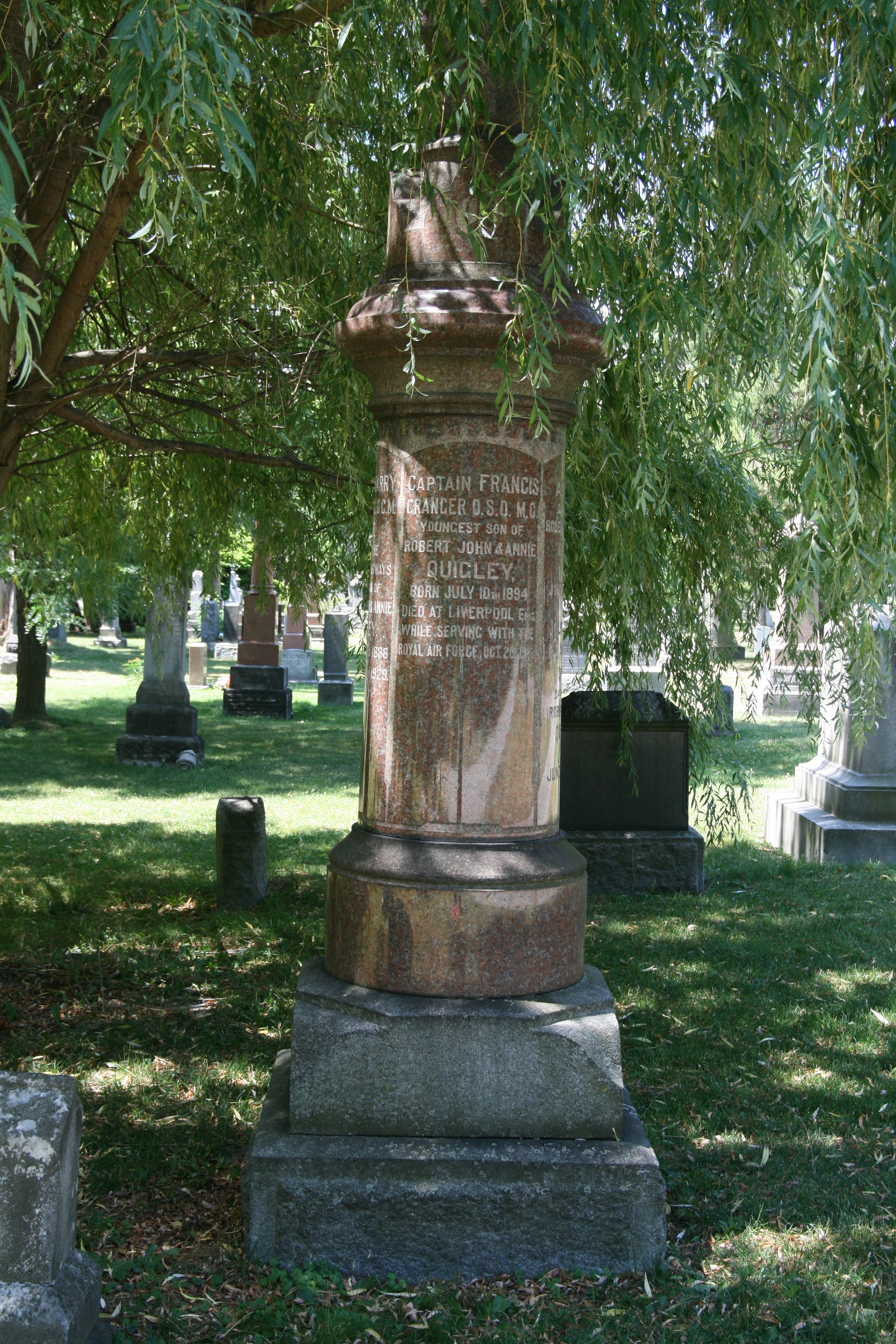
Quigley's grave at Mount Pleasant Cemetery in Toronto, Ontario

Quigley was wounded in action on 27 March 1918 and recovered in Le Touquet Hospital. He was returned to Canada to finish his recuperation from his shattered ankle. He served as an instructor at Armour Heights while he was in Canada. In June the London Gazette announced the award of the Distinguished Service Order to Quigley, the citation reading:

For conspicuous gallantry and devotion to duty. While leading an offensive patrol he attacked a very large number of enemy aeroplanes, destroyed one of them and drove another down out of control. On the following day, while on a low-flying patrol, he was attacked by several enemy scouts, one of which dived at him. He out-manoeuvred this machine and fired on it at very close range. He followed it down to 500 feet, firing on it, and it spiralled very steeply to the ground in a cloud of black smoke. During the three following days, while employed on low-flying work, he showed the greatest skill and determination. He fired over 3,000 rounds and dropped thirty bombs during this period, inflicting heavy casualties on enemy infantry, artillery and transport.

After his convalescence, Quigley requested a return to action in France. While returning to England in October 1918, Quigley came down with influenza and died in a hospital in Liverpool two days after his ship docked. He is buried at Mount Pleasant Cemetery in Toronto, Ontario.

== Bibliography ==
- Above the Trenches: A Complete Record of the Fighter Aces and Units of the British Empire Air Forces 1915–1920 Christopher F. Shores, Norman L. R. Franks, Russell Guest. Grub Street, 1990. ISBN 0-948817-19-4, ISBN 978-0-948817-19-9.
