= George R. Howsam =

Canadian First World War flying ace

George Roberts Howsam
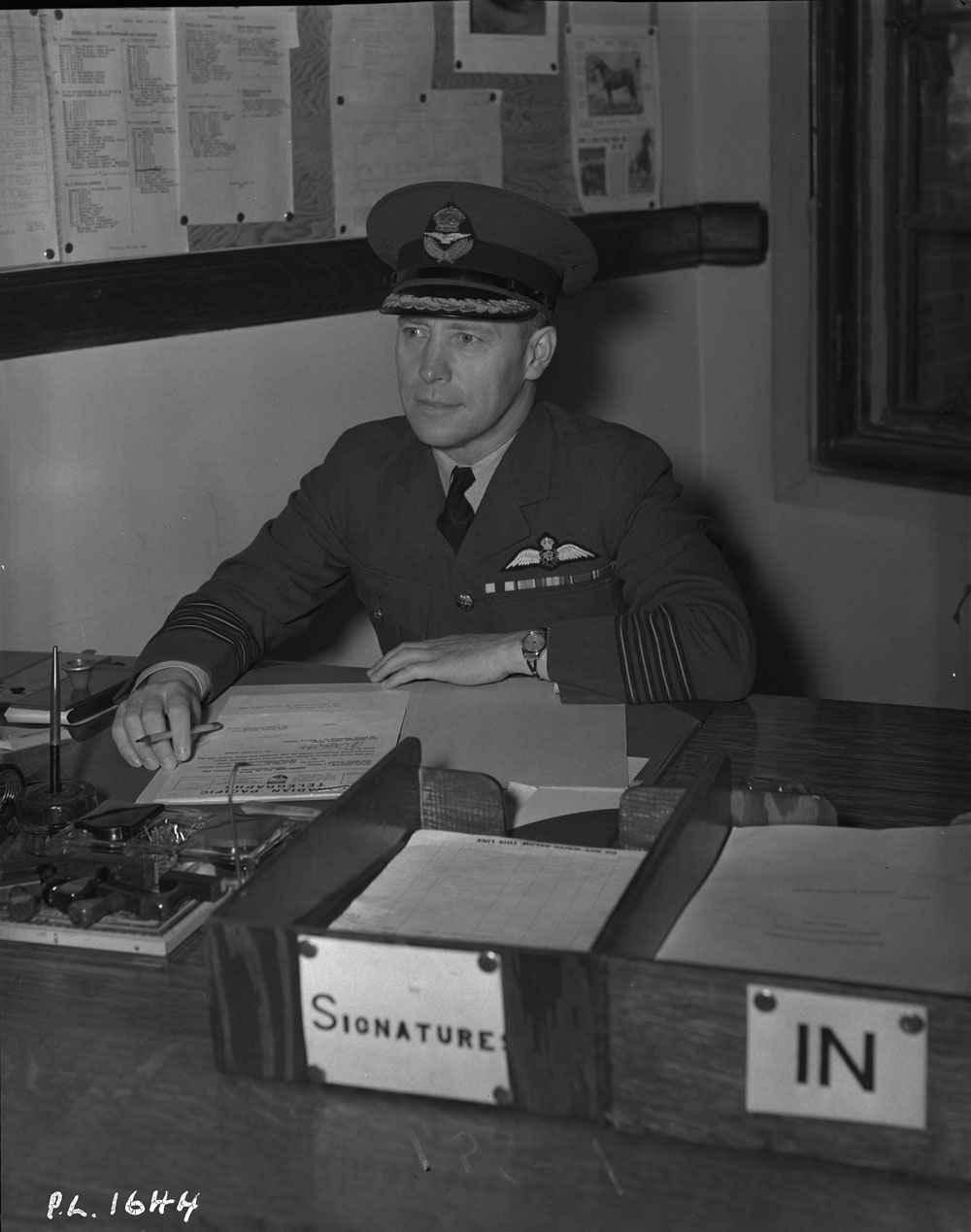
- Born: 29 January 1895; Reach, Ontario, Canada
- Died: 16 April 1988 (aged 93); Victoria, British Columbia, Canada
- Military career
- Branch: Canadian Expeditionary Force; Royal Flying Corps; Royal Air Force; Royal Canadian Air Force
- Service years: 1917–1945
- Rank: Air Vice Marshal
- Units: No. 43 Squadron RAF, No. 70 Squadron RAF
- Awards: Order of the Bath, Military Cross
- Other work: Air Vice Marshal in Royal Canadian Air Force

Air Vice Marshal George Roberts Howsam, CB, MC (29 January 1895 –16 April 1988) was a Canadian First World War flying ace, officially credited with 13 victories. Serving in the newly formed Royal Canadian Air Force in the inter-war years, Howsam served as the RCAF's Director of Training during World War II.

== Early life and service ==
George Roberts Howsam's parents were George and Ida Cutting Howsam. The younger George Howsam joined the Canadian Expeditionary Force right out of high school, on 23 March 1916. He gave his home address as Rural Route 4, Port Perry, Ontario. He is described as being a Methodist, five feet six inches tall, blue eyed, with fair complexion. He served successively with the 116th (Ontario County) Battalion, CEF and the 182nd (Ontario County) Battalion, CEF. He transferred to the Royal Flying Corps in Spring 1917, while he was still in Canada; he trained at Deseronto and Camp Borden.

== World War I aerial service ==
Howsam joined 70 Squadron in Autumn 1917 as a Sopwith Camel pilot. He barely made the 1917 scoring lists, destroying an Albatros two-seater over Zarren, Belgium on 28 December 1917 for his first win. He repeated on 19 January 1918, sending the Albatros down out of control at Moorslede, Belgium. Three days later, he flew three sorties, and scored every time. He destroyed an Albatros D.V at 1245; his next sortie set an observation plane aflame at 1315; on his last sortie, he and Captain Frank Granger Quigley cooperated in flaming one Albatros D.V and putting another down out of control. A victory apiece on the 24th and 25th, and Howsam ended January 1918 with eight wins. Another followed on 27 February. Howsam won a Military Cross, awarded 4 March. Within a week, he downed three more planes. On 24 March, he was wounded in action and withdrawn to Home Establishment. He would return to the front as a Flight Commander in 43 Squadron in October. Flying a Sopwith Snipe, he set a Fokker D.VII afire on 30 October to cap his career as an ace. His final total was eight German planes destroyed and five driven down out of control.

== Post World War I ==
Howsam did not return to Canada until May 1921. He attended the RAF Staff College in 1930. During World War II, he served as Director of Training for the RCAF. He retired in 1945.

== Text of citations ==
=== Military Cross ===
During his service in the General List and the Royal Flying Corps, T./2nd Lt. George Robert Howsam participated in several aerial engagements. Records indicate that he destroyed five enemy aircraft and forced others down. For these actions, he was recognized for his performance and initiative in combat.
