= Airfields of Britain Conservation Trust =

British non-profit organisation

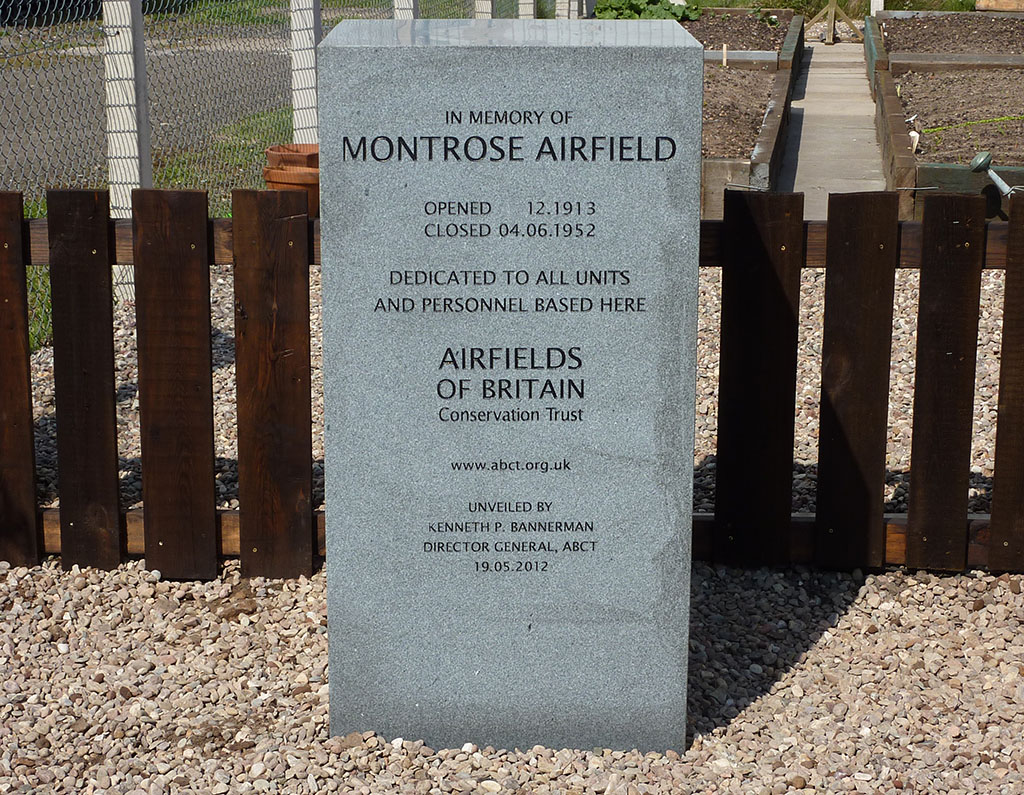
- Memorial placed by the Trust at Montrose Airfield
- Abbreviation: ABCT
- Founded: 25 January 2006; 20 years ago
- Founder: Kenneth Peacock Bannerman
- Type: Non-profit organisation
- Registration no.: 1156877
- Legal status: Charity
- Purpose: Former airfields
- Region served: Great Britain
- Services: Supply, installation and dedication of memorial stones
- Website: www.abct.org.uk

The Airfields of Britain Conservation Trust (ABCT), founded 2006, is a non-profit organisation that works to preserve and protect airfields in Great Britain, as well as educating people about their history. The Trust is a registered charity.

They place inscribed memorial stones on or near disused airfields, which have included a memorial at Fambridge, Essex in February 2009, at Windermere in Cumbria in 2011 and at Montrose Air Station Heritage Centre in May 2012. Other memorial locations include Harrowbeer, Hatfield, Lanark, Leavesden, Matlaske, Okehampton, Podington, Swannington, Westcott and Woburn Park.
