= Frank Gorringe =

British World War I flying ace

Frank Clifton Gorringe
- Born: 30 September 1889; Eastbourne, Sussex, England
- Died: January 1936 (aged 46) near Newhaven, Sussex England
- Military career
- Allegiance: George V of the United Kingdom
- Branch: Aviation
- Rank: Captain
- Units: No. 43 Squadron RFC, No. 70 Squadron RFC/No. 70 Squadron RAF, No. 210 Squadron RAF
- Awards: Military Cross, Distinguished Flying Cross

Captain Frank Clifton Gorringe was a British World War I flying ace credited with 14 aerial victories.

== Early life and enlistment ==
Frank Clifton Gorringe was born in Eastbourne, England on 30 September 1889.

Gorringe was working as an express clerk when he enlisted in the Canadian Expeditionary Force on 23 September 1914, a week shy of his 25th birthday. Frank J. Gorringe was listed as his next of kin, and obviously is his father. The enlistee was five feet six inches tall, had a fair complexion, light brown hair, hazel eyes, and professed to belong to the Church of England. He enlisted in the 11th Battalion, Canadian Expeditionary Force.

== Aerial service ==
Gorringe first trained as an observer and flew manning the observer's gun in a Sopwith 1½ Strutter with 43 Squadron in 1917. From there, he progressed to pilot's training at Hendon, receiving Aero Club certificate # 5035 on 29 July 1917. Once qualified to fly a Sopwith Camel, he was posted to Nol 70 Squadron RAF|No. 70 Squadron RFC]]. On 7 November 1917, he scored his first win; at the end of the year, on 28 December, he became an ace. He had driven down an enemy reconnaissance plane out of control, captured another, teamed with Frank Granger Quigley to set an Albatros D.V, and destroyed two other recce planes. He began the new year by helping to flame another recce plane; by 18 February 1918, on which date he burned one Albatros D.V and destroyed another, he had run his total to 14. His final tally was six planes set afire, five otherwise destroyed, two driven down out of control, and one captured. His Military Cross was gazetted on 16 August 1918. He was then returned to Home Establishment for a bit, not returning to action until 25 October 1918. In the waning days of the war, Gorringe flew ground attack sorties as a Flight Commander in 210 Squadron. On 9 November 1918, he actually landed just behind advancing friendly troops to brief them on the defenses they now faced. He won a Distinguished Flying Cross for his actions.

== Postwar career ==
After the war, Gorringe farmed in Kenya until he returned to England in 1935. He was found drowned on the shore near Newhaven in January 1936. An inquest into his death could not determine how he ended up in the water.

== Honours and awards ==
Text of citation for Military Cross (MC)

T./2nd Lt. Frank Clifton Gorringe, Gen. List and R.F.C.

For conspicuous gallantry and devotion to duty. He has destroyed several enemy machines, and has shot down others out of control. On several occasions also he has forced enemy aeroplanes to land, and has shown fine qualities of leadership and a keen offensive spirit.

Text for citation for Distinguished Flying Cross (DFC)

Lieut. (A./Capt.) Frank Clifton Gorringe, M.C. (FRANCE)

During recent operations this officer was conspicuous for his gallantry and initiative in attacking enemy troops, transport, etc., notably on 9 November, when, locating certain enemy troops dug in, he attacked them from 50 feet altitude, causing numerous casualties. He then landed close behind our infantry and informed them of the enemy's position.
