= Walter M. Carlaw =

Walter Macfarlane Carlaw
- Born: 8 March 1899; Glasgow, Scotland
- Died: 24 November 1956 (aged 57)
- Military career
- Allegiance: United Kingdom
- Branch: British Army; Royal Air Force
- Service years: 1917-1919; 1941-1945
- Rank: Squadron Leader
- Unit: No. 70 Squadron RAF
- Conflicts: World War I World War II
- Awards: Distinguished Flying Cross

Squadron Leader Walter Macfarlane Carlaw DFC (8 March 1899 – 24 November 1956) was a Scottish flying ace who served during World War I, and was credited with 12 confirmed aerial victories. He returned to RAF service during World War II.

== Early life ==
Walter Macfarlane Carlaw was the son of Walter and Jeannie Carlaw of Blythwood in Glasgow, Scotland.

== World War I ==
Carlaw joined the Royal Flying Corps in May 1917, and was confirmed in the rank of temporary second lieutenant on 9 November 1917. Posted to 70 Squadron in early 1918, his first success came three days after his nineteenth birthday, on 11 March 1918; he was one of four pilots credited with destroying a German observation balloon over Menen, Belgium. He shared the win with Frank Granger Quigley, Alfred Michael Koch, and Kenneth Seth-Smith. The following day, 12 March 1918, he single-handedly drove down an Albatros D.V out of control.

He was appointed a flight commander, with the acting rank of captain on 14 July 1918. On 29 July 1918, he destroyed an Albatros D.VII, which began a string of ten triumphs over the new advanced German fighter aircraft. By the time he ended his tally on 14 October 1918, he had destroyed seven Fokker D.VIIs and driven down three others out of control.

Carlaw was awarded the Distinguished Flying Cross, which was gazetted after the armistice, on 3 December 1918. The citation read:

A bold and skilful fighter who has accounted for five enemy machines—two in one engagement, which occurred on 31 July.

On 17 January 1919 Carlaw was transferred to the unemployed list, returning to Glasgow to have a successful career as a mechanical engineer.

== World War II ==
Carlaw returned to the colours during World War II, being commissioned into the Royal Air Force Volunteer Reserve on 28 November 1941, as a probationary acting-pilot officer in the Administrative and Special Duties Branch, being confirmed in the rank on 28 January 1942. He was promoted to flying officer on 1 October 1942, and to flight lieutenant on 1 October 1945.

After the war Carlaw remained on the list of reserve officers until relinquishing his commission on 10 February 1954, and was granted permission to retain the rank of squadron leader.

Carlaw died on 24 November 1956, and is buried at Cardross cemetery, Scotland.
