= Oscar Heron =

Irish World War I flying ace

Oscar Aloysius Patrick Heron
- Born: 17 September 1896; Banbrook, Armagh, Ireland
- Died: 5 August 1933 (aged 36); Phoenix Park, Dublin, Ireland
- Burial place: Glasnevin Cemetery, Dublin; 53°22′20″N 6°16′40″W
- Military career
- Allegiance: United Kingdom; Irish Free State
- Branch: British Army; Royal Air Force; Irish Air Corps
- Service years: c.1914–1922 1922–1933
- Rank: Captain
- Units: Connaught Rangers; No. 70 Squadron RAF; No. 3 Squadron RAF
- Conflicts: World War I; Western Front
- Awards: Distinguished Flying Cross; Croix de guerre (Belgium)

Captain Oscar Aloysius Patrick Heron DFC (17 September 1896 – 5 August 1933) was an Irish World War I flying ace of the British Royal Air Force, credited with thirteen confirmed aerial victories. He later served in the Irish Air Corps, until killed in a flying accident.

== Early life and background ==
Heron was born in Armagh, Ireland, the eldest of three sons born to Charles and Annie Heron. His father was the principal of St. Patrick's Boys School, while his mother headed the girls' section. The family lived in Banbrook Hill, and the 1911 census lists Oscar and his two brothers John and Charles, their parents, his mother's father Jeremiah McKenna, a cook, and two servant girls as residing there.

== World War I ==
=== Flying activities ===
Heron served for a period in the Connaught Rangers, before being commissioned from cadet to temporary second lieutenant (on probation) in the Royal Flying Corps on 13 December 1917. He was assigned to No. 70 Squadron to fly the Sopwith Camel single-seat fighter in May 1918. On 30 June, he gained his first victories, driving down an Albatros D.V and setting another ablaze. It would not be until 19 August that he would win again, when he destroyed a Fokker D.VII on an evening patrol. Again, there would be over a month's lapse, until he destroyed another Fokker D.VII on 28 September. On 1 October, Heron became an ace by destroying the only two-seater on his list; on the 7th he accounted for two more D.VII's, and three more on the 9th. For one of these, Heron cooperated with Captain Sydney Liversedge, Lieutenant Kenneth Watson and two other pilots to force down and capture a Fokker. Heron was appointed a flight commander with the temporary rank of captain on 23 October, going on to gain three more victories, two on 26 October, and his thirteenth and last on the 28th. In the end, besides the captured aircraft, Heron destroyed ten enemy machines and drove down two out of control.

Heron was subsequently awarded the Distinguished Flying Cross, which was gazetted on 7 February 1919. His citation read:

Second Lieutenant (Acting Captain) Oscar Alois [sic] Patrick Heron.

"An officer conspicuous for his skill and daring in aerial combats. He has accounted for eight enemy aeroplanes. On 28th September he attacked, single-handed, three Fokkers; one of these he shot down. On another occasion he, in company with five other machines, engaged six Fokkers, all six being destroyed, 2nd Lt. Heron accounting for two."

On 15 July 1919 Heron was granted permission to wear the Croix de guerre conferred by Belgium.

=== List of aerial victories ===
Combat record
No.	Date/Time	Aircraft/ Serial No.	Opponent	Result	Location	Notes
1	30 June 1918 @ 2035–2040	Sopwith Camel (D6492)	Albatros D.V	Out of control	East of Bray	
2	30 June 1918 @ 2035–2040	Sopwith Camel (D6492)	Albatros D.V	Destroyed in flames	East of Bray	
3	19 August 1918 @ 1955	Sopwith Camel (C3306)	Fokker D.VII	Destroyed	Houthem–Hollebeke	
4	28 September 1918 @ 1145	Sopwith Camel (D6696)	Fokker D.VII	Destroyed	North-east of Passchendaele	
5	1 October 1918 @ 1630	Sopwith Camel (E7201)	LVG C	Destroyed	South-west of Ardoye	
6	7 October 1918 @ 0845	Sopwith Camel (D6696)	Fokker D.VII	Destroyed in flames	Lichtervelde	
7	7 October 1918 @ 0845	Sopwith Camel (D6696)	Fokker D.VII	Destroyed in flames	Lichtervelde	
8	9 October 1918 @ 0940–0945	Sopwith Camel (E7277)	Fokker D.VII	Destroyed	East of Roulers	
9	9 October 1918 @ 0940–0945	Sopwith Camel (E7277)	Fokker D.VII	Destroyed	Roulers	
10	9 October 1918 @ 0940–0945	Sopwith Camel (E7277)	Fokker D.VII	Captured	West of Mayerneine	Shared with Captain Sydney Liversedge and Lieutenants E. A. Copp, A. Webster & Kenneth Watson.
11	26 October 1918 @ 1515	Sopwith Camel (C8201)	Fokker D.VII	Destroyed	South of Monchau	
12	26 October 1918 @ 1515	Sopwith Camel (C8201)	Fokker D.VII	Out of control	Montroeul-au-Bois	
13	28 October 1918 @ 1140	Sopwith Camel (B7883)	Fokker D.VII	Destroyed in flames	Quatres	

== Post-war career ==
Heron was transferred to the RAF's unemployed list on 10 August 1919, but was granted a short service commission with the rank of flying officer two months later on 24 October. He served in No. 3 Squadron RAF based in Ambala, India, from 1 April 1921. On 7 November 1922, on completion of his period of service, Heron was transferred to the Reserve of Air Force Officers. He then returned to Ireland to join the National Army Air Service, which became the Air Corps in 1924, and served as an instructor based at Baldonnel Airfield. He finally relinquished his RAF Reserve commission on 7 November 1926.

== Death ==
Heron was killed on 5 August 1933 while taking part in a mock aerial combat over Phoenix Park, Dublin, for Irish Aviation Day. Three days before, during practice flights, two aircraft collided, killing Lieutenant J. P. Twohig. Heron acted a pall-bearer at Twohig's funeral on the morning of the event. In the display Heron flew a Vickers Vespa, fighting off an attack by three Avro Cadets. At the end he made a low pass over the park, in front of a large crowd, including his wife, but span into the ground from a height of about five hundred feet (150 m). Heron and his air gunner were pulled from the wreckage, but he died almost immediately, while the air-gunner, Private Richard Tobin, died the following day. Heron was buried with full military honours at Glasnevin Cemetery on 8 August.

== Bibliography ==
- Shores, Christopher F.; Franks, Norman & Guest, Russell F. (1990). Above the Trenches: a Complete Record of the Fighter Aces and Units of the British Empire Air Forces 1915–1920. London, UK: Grub Street. ISBN 978-0-948817-19-9.
