= Alfred Michael Koch =

Swiss-born Canadian flying ace

- Born: 25 January 1894; Arosa, Graubünden, Switzerland
- Died: Post 1984; Vancouver, British Columbia, Canada
- Military career
- Allegiance: United Kingdom
- Branch: Royal Flying Corps
- Rank: Lieutenant
- Units: No. 1 Squadron RFC, No. 6 Squadron RFC, No. 70 Squadron RAF
- Awards: Military Cross

Lieutenant Alfred Michael Koch MC was a Swiss-born Canadian flying ace credited with ten aerial victories.

== Early life ==
Alfred Michael Koch was born on 25 February 1894 in Arosa, Graubünden, Switzerland. He moved to Canada at the age of four years with his father John Koch. The younger Koch enlisted in the 19th Alberta Dragoons on 23 September 1914 at Valcartier, Canada, and was assigned regimental number 2077. He listed a home address in Edmonton, Alberta, Canada, his profession as law student, and claimed prior military experience. His physical examination reported him as 5 feet 3 1/2 inches tall. He reportedly has dark complexion, with dark brown hair, grey eyes, and moles on his right arm.

== World War I ==
Koch was originally a trumpeter for the Alberta Dragoons. He transferred to the 1st Cavalry Division CEF and shipped out for the war zone.

He flew as an aerial observer in 6 Squadron, and was wounded in action on 22 October 1916. He made the transition to fighter pilot and was posted to fly 70 Squadron's Sopwith Camels. On 18 October 1917, he began a decade of successes that carried him through to 23 March 1918. He succeeded against nine German fighter planes as well as destroying one of their observation balloons. However, he was not awarded the Military Cross for these victories. When his Military Cross citation was gazetted on 22 June 1918, it read:

"...During ten days' operations he carried out eleven reconnaissances at low altitudes. He continually attacked and disorganised enemy troops and transport, and on one occasion he dispersed a battalion of enemy infantry which was marching along a road. On a later occasion, after he had completed a reconnaissance and bombed an enemy position, he was attacked by an enemy patrol. Though his tanks were pierced, and he was wounded, he succeeded in flying his machine back to the aerodrome. He showed splendid courage and initiative."

The last known information about Koch is that he was wounded once again in 1918.

== List of aerial victories ==
All victories scored while flying a Sopwith Camel fighter plane for No. 70 Squadron RAF.

No.	Date/time	Aircraft	Foe	Result	Location	Notes
1	18 October 1917 @ 0900 hours	Sopwith Camel serial number B2399	Albatros D.V fighter plane	Destroyed	Westrozebeke, Belgium	
2	20 October 1917 @ 1130 hours	Sopwith Camel s/n B2399	Albatros D.V fighter	Driven down out of control	Abeele	
3	8 November 1917 @ 1145 hours	Sopwith Camel s/n B2444	Albatros D.V fighter	Driven down out of control	Westrozebeke, Belgium	
4	24 January 1918 @ 1130 hours	Sopwith Camel s/n B9138	Albatros reconnaissance plane	Driven down out of control	Westrozebeke, Belgium	
5		Sopwith Camel s/n/B1938	Two-seater reconnaissance plane	Driven down out of control	Dadizeele	
6	11 March 1918 @ 1230 hours	Sopwith Camel	Observation balloon	Destroyed by fire	Menen, Belgium	Victory shared with aces Frank Granger Quigley, Kenneth Seth-Smith, Walter M. Carlaw
7	11 March 1918 @ 1700 hours	Sopwith Camel	Pfalz D.III fighter	Destroyed	Passendale, Belgium	Victory shared with Frank Quigley
8	22 March 1918 @ 1525 hours	Sopwith Camel s/n C1672	Albatros reconnaissance plane	Driven down out of control	Vicinity of Cagnicourt, France	
9	22 March 1918 @ 1535 hours	Sopwith Camel s/n C1672	Albatros D.V fighter	Destroyed	Southeast of Lagnicourt, France	
10	23 March 1918 @ 0835 hours	Sopwith Camel s/n C1672	Albatros D.V fighter	Driven down out of control	Northwest of Cambrai, France	
