= James H. Gribben =

- Civil War era Army Medal of Honor
- Born: April 1839; Ireland
- Died: August 6, 1878 (aged 39)
- Burial place: Cypress Hills Cemetery; Brooklyn, New York, US
- Military career
- Allegiance: United States of America
- Branch: United States Army
- Service years: 1861 - 1865
- Rank: First Lieutenant
- Units: (New York (state)) Company C, 2nd New York Volunteer Cavalry Regiment
- Conflicts: American Civil War: Battle of Sayler's Creek
- Awards: Medal of Honor

James Henry Gribben (April 1839 - August 6, 1878) was an American soldier who fought in the American Civil War. Gribben received his country's highest award for bravery during combat, the Medal of Honor. Gribben's medal was won for capturing the flag of the Confederate 12th Virginia Infantry at the Battle of Sayler's Creek in Virginia on April 6, 1865. He was honored with the award on May 3, 1865.

Gribben was born in Ireland. He joined the US Army from New York City in September 1861, and was discharged in June 1865. He was buried at Cypress Hills Cemetery in Brooklyn. Green-Wood Cemetery was mistakenly recorded on his death certificate.

== Medal of Honor citation ==
The President of the United States of America, in the name of Congress, takes pleasure in presenting the Medal of Honor to First Lieutenant (Cavalry) James H. Gribben, United States Army, for extraordinary heroism on 6 April 1865, while serving with Company C, 2d New York Cavalry, in action at Deatonsville (Sailor's Creek), Virginia, for capture of flag of 12th Virginia Infantry (Confederate States of America).

== See also ==
- List of American Civil War Medal of Honor recipients: G–L
