= Kenneth Bowman Watson =

Canadian World War I flying ace

- Born: 5 June 1897; Hamilton, Ontario, Canada
- Died: 5 March 1960 (aged 62)
- Military career
- Allegiance: Canada
- Branch: Royal Flying Corps
- Service years: 1917–1919
- Rank: Lieutenant
- Unit: No. 70 Squadron RAF
- Awards: Distinguished Flying Cross

Lieutenant Kenneth Bowman Watson was a Canadian World War I flying ace. He was credited with nine aerial victories. On 9 October 1918, he achieved the extraordinary feat of capturing two enemy airplanes during a dogfight.

== Personal life ==
Kenneth Bowman Watson was born in Hamilton, Ontario, Canada on 5 June 1897. He died on 5 March 1960. Watson is buried in Bethesda Lutheran Cemetery, Markham, Ontario, Canada. His wife, Hilda V. Darby Watson, is buried there with him.

== World War I ==
Watson underwent his aviation training while still in Canada. He was posted overseas to France in 1917. On 13 August 1917, Watson was commissioned as a second lieutenant in the Royal Flying Corps. He trained as a fighter pilot and was initially assigned to No. 28 Squadron in Italy. However, Watson would not achieve his first aerial success until after his transfer to No. 70 Squadron in France. After becoming an ace on 8 October, he scored two victories the following day. In an extraordinary feat, he singlehandedly drove down a Fokker D.VII and its German pilot into captivity and simultaneously cooperated with four other British pilots in a second capture of a D.VII and pilot. Watson earned the Distinguished Flying Cross for his valor, though not for the twin captivities. The DFC would not be promulgated until after war's end.

== List of aerial victories ==
See also Aerial victory standards of World War I

No.	Date/time	Aircraft	Foe	Result	Location	Notes
1	31 May 1918 @ 1750 hours	Sopwith Camel serial number C8218	Albatros D.V	Destroyed	Southeast of Bapaume	
2	29 June 1918 @ 0920 hours	Sopwith Camel s/n C8218	Albatros D.V	Driven down out of control	Iries	
3	4 September 1918 @ 1815 hours	Sopwith Camel s/n E7173	Fokker D.VII	Set afire; destroyed	Escaillon	
4	29 September 1918 @ 1140 hours	Sopwith Camel s/n E7173	Fokker D.VII	Destroyed	Oostnieuwkerke	
5	8 October 1918 @ 1750 hours	Sopwith Camel s/n E7173	German reconnaissance plane	Destroyed	East of Menen	
6	9 October 1918 @ 0945 hours	Sopwith Camel s/n E7173	Fokker D.VII	Captured	South of Roulers	
7	9 October 1918 @ 0945 hours	Sopwith Camel s/n E7173	Fokker D.VII	Captured	West of Mayerneine	Victory shared with Oscar Heron, three other pilots
8	28 October 1918 @ 1145 hours	Sopwith Camel s/n E7173	Fokker D.VII	Destroyed	Bois du Biez	
9	4 November 1918 @ 1145 hours	Sopwith Camel s/n E7173	Fokker D.VII	Destroyed	Southwest of Renaix	No. 70 Squadron's final victory for the war

== Post World War I ==
Watson's Distinguished Flying Cross was gazetted on 8 February 1919:

On 28th October, when on offensive patrol, this officer took part in an engagement between six of our machines and twenty-two Fokkers. In the combat that ensued four of the latter were destroyed, Lieut. Watson accounting for one. In addition to the foregoing he has four other machines to his credit.

On 12 July 1919 Kenneth Bowman Watson transferred to the unemployed list of the Royal Air Force and vanished into obscurity for the remainder of his life.
