= Edward Gribben =

- Born: 10 September 1890; County Down, Ireland
- Military career
- Allegiance: United Kingdom
- Branch: British Army; Royal Air Force
- Service years: 1914–1920; 1930–1938; 1939–1945
- Rank: Lieutenant-Colonel (Army); Squadron Leader (RAF)
- Units: Royal Irish Rifles; No. 70 Squadron RFC; No. 44 Squadron RFC; No. 41 Squadron RAF
- Commands: 18th Battalion, London Regiment (London Irish Rifles)
- Conflicts: World War I World War II
- Awards: Military Cross

Edward Gribben was a World War I flying ace credited with five aerial victories. He became a lieutenant-colonel in the Territorial Army between the wars, returning to the RAF in World War II, and rising to the rank of squadron leader.

== Biography ==
=== Early life and background ===
Gribben was born in County Down, Ireland, and in the 1911 Census was recorded as resident at Dunnanew, Rossconor, unmarried, aged 23, and working as a draper's assistant in Castlewellan. He was living with his mother Alice Gribben, father Thomas, and six siblings.

=== World War I ===
Gribben joined the army soon after the outbreak of World War I, being commissioned as a second lieutenant (on probation) in the 5th Battalion, Royal Irish Rifles on 15 August 1914. He was promoted to lieutenant on 22 May 1915, and was later seconded to the Royal Flying Corps to train as a pilot, being appointed a flying officer on 24 December 1916.

Gribben was posted to No. 70 Squadron in early 1917. He flew a Sopwith Camel to score five victories between 17 July and 13 August, his final tally being two enemy aircraft destroyed, and three driven down out of control. On 9 September, he returned to England to serve with No. 44 Squadron as a night fighter pilot flying a Camel. On 26 September he was awarded the Military Cross, which was gazetted on 8 January 1918. His citation read:

Military Cross
Lieutenant Edward Gribben, Royal Irish Rifles, Special Reserve, and Royal Flying Corps.

For conspicuous gallantry and devotion to duty on offensive patrols. In every combat he has been most conspicuous, continually attacking superior numbers of the enemy, destroying some and driving others down out of control. He fights with great dash and skill, and whenever any machine of his formation is in difficulties, he is invariably at hand to render assistance.

On 1 January 1918 he was appointed a flight commander with the temporary rank of captain. Gribben then served as a test pilot at the Royal Aircraft Establishment at Farnborough. He returned to combat on 2 October 1918 as a flight commander in No. 41 Squadron. Two days later, he and his Camel were badly shot up by a Fokker D.VII; although wounded in the arm, Gribben crash-landed safely.

=== Inter-war career ===
Gribben left the RAF on 24 January 1920, being transferred to the unemployed list. He relinquished his army commission in what was now the Royal Ulster Rifles on 1 April 1920. On 4 May 1920 he was granted a short service commission in the RAF with the rank of flight lieutenant, but this was cancelled on 10 August 1920.

Gribben return to the military when appointed a captain in the 18th Battalion, London Regiment (London Irish Rifles), a Territorial Army unit, on 15 March 1930. On 1 November 1934 he was promoted to lieutenant colonel. On 1 November 1938 Gribben retired from the London Irish, giving up his command.

=== World War II and after ===
Just prior to the outbreak of World War II Gribben joined the Royal Air Force Volunteer Reserve, being commissioned as a flight lieutenant on 1 September 1939. He was promoted to squadron leader on 16 December 1941. He remained a member of the Air Force Reserves post-war, finally relinquishing his commission on 10 February 1954, at the age of 65.
