= No. 70 Squadron RAF =

Flying squadron of the Royal Air Force

No. LXX Squadron RAF
- Active: 22 Apr 1916 – 2 Jan 1920; 1 Feb 1920 – 31 Mar 1946; 15 Apr 1946 – 1 Apr 1947; 1 May 1948 – 8 Sep 2010; 1 Oct 2014 – present
- Country: United Kingdom
- Branch: Royal Air Force
- Role: Strategic and tactical air transport
- Part of: No. 2 Group RAF
- Home station: RAF Brize Norton
- Nicknames: Usquam (Latin for 'Anywhere')
- Aircraft: Airbus A400M Atlas C1

Insignia
- Squadron badge heraldry: A demi-wing lion erased. Developed from an unofficial winged lion badge probably derived from the squadron's long dependence on the Napier Lion engine during the 1920s.

No. 70 or LXX Squadron (Note: Although 'LXX' is an archaic term (Roman numerals for '70'), raf.mod.uk will redirect any enquiries for 70 squadron to a page headed 'LXX squadron' (October 2024)) RAF operates the Airbus A400M Atlas C.1, to provide strategic air transport worldwide. It is based at RAF Brize Norton.

== History ==
=== First World War ===
The squadron was formed on 22 April 1916 at Farnborough, and was equipped with the Sopwith 1½ Strutter two seat fighter. The shortage of effective fighter aircraft on the Western Front resulted in the squadron being deployed to France piecemeal, with a first flight arriving at Fienvillers in Northern France on 22 April 1916, with the remaining two flights being deployed on 29 June and 30 July respectively. These were the first 1½ Strutters of the RFC, and the first aircraft of the RFC equipped with interrupter gear to arrive in France. In 1917 it re-equipped with Sopwith Camels.

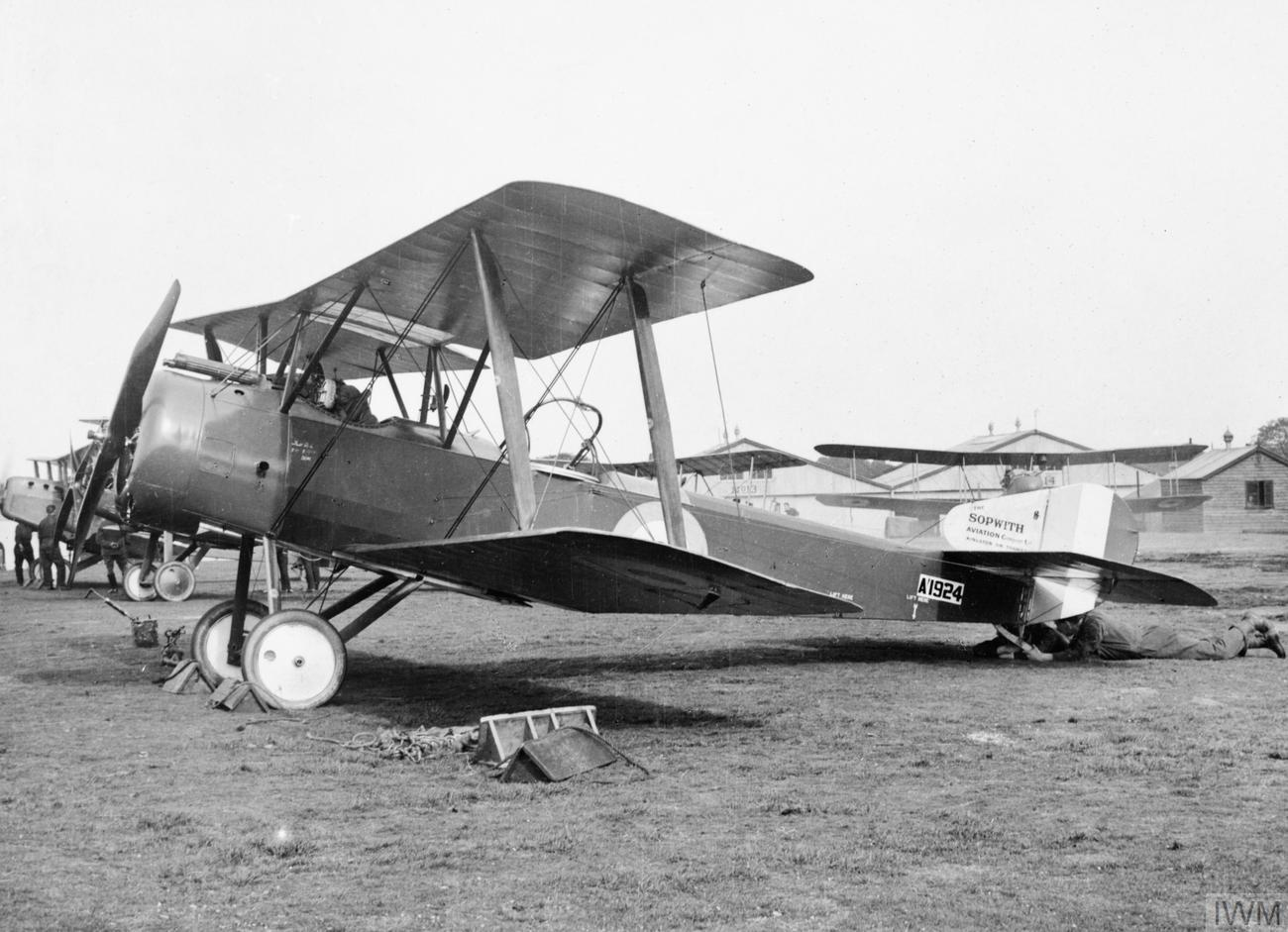
A Sopwith 1½ Strutter #A1924 of 70th Squadron RAF. Wrecked 20 October 1916

During the First World War, the squadron claimed 287 victories, and had as members nineteen aces, including Frank Granger Quigley, John Todd, Frank Hobson, Oscar Heron, Frank Gorringe, Walter M. Carlaw, George Robert Howsam, Clive Franklyn Collett, Alfred Michael Koch, Kenneth Bowman Watson, Noel Webb, Edward Gribben, and Frederic Laurence.

=== Inter-war years ===
The squadron briefly disbanded in January 1920, reforming nine days later at Heliopolis, Egypt, by the renumbering of No. 58 Squadron. 70 squadron was now a bomber-transport unit operating two types of bomber, the Vickers Vimy and the Handley Page Type O/400. The squadron moved to Baghdad West Aerodrome on the 16th January 1922 and then to the newly-completed RAF Hinaidi on the 31st May 1922. In November 1922, the squadron was re-equipped with the Vickers Vernon which was gradually phased out by various variants of the Vickers Victoria from January 1924 until November 1935 when the squadron was re-equipped with the Vickers Valentia flying boat.

In addition to providing heavy transport facilities to both air and ground units they were used as air ambulances and were responsible for maintaining the Cairo-Baghdad airmail route. The squadron was commanded by Group Captain Eric Murray DSO MC. In 1929, he flew the first route to the Cape on behalf of Imperial Airways who were seeking routes for the civil flights.

In December 1928, a coup against the Amir of Afghanistan by Habibullah Kalakani supported by Ghilzai peoples led to the first large scale air evacuation, the Kabul Airlift. Over two months Victoria troop-carriers of 70 squadron played central role in the airlift of 586 British and European officials and civilians flying over mountains at a height of up to 10,000 feet (3,000 m) often in severe weather.

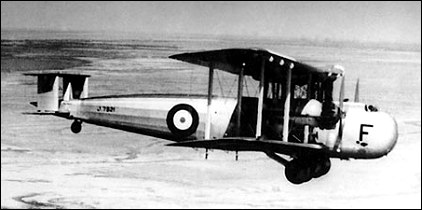
Vickers Type 264 Valentia transport

70 Squadron was based at RAF Hinaidi in Baghdad from May 1922 until the 16th October 1937, almost the entire time that RAF Hinaidi was the centre of operations for all British Forces in Mesopotamia. No other squadron matched that record, though No. 1 Squadron RAF was the first squadron to take up residence at RAF Hinaidi on 20 April 1921, before the base was fully operational. No. 1 Squadron remained at RAF Hinaidi until it was disbanded on 1 November 1926.

On 16 October 1937, 70 Squadron moved from Hinaidi to the newly completed British Forces centre of operations at RAF Dhibban, the name quickly changed to RAF Habbaniya. The squadron remained at RAF Habbaniya until the 30th August 1939 when it returned to Helwan in Egypt.

In the time that 70 Squadron was based at RAF Hinaidi, eleven of its men lost their lives and were buried at the base's cemetery, located on the southern border of the RAF cantonment on land still owned by the British Ministry of Defence. Originally named the Hinaidi RAF Peace Cemetery, the cemetery was renamed the Ma’Asker Al Raschid RAF Cemetery in 1961.

According to the Commonwealth War Graves Commission Annual Reports the cemetery at Ma’Asker was last maintained in 1974 and is now in a derelict condition, though a new wall was constructed around the used part of the cemetery in October 2021. A total of 77 headstones have survived at the cemetery today but only six of these headstones are for 70 Squadron burials.

=== Second World War ===
At the outbreak of war in September 1939, No. 70 squadron had just moved to RAF Helwan, in a suburb of Cairo, Egypt. Italy entered the war on 10 June 1940, and on that date the squadron switched to RAF Heliopolis, still in Cairo, and still flying the obsolescent Valentia transport aircraft. On 1 September 1940 the role of the squadron changed when they started to receive modern equipment in the shape of six Vickers Wellington bombers. Later that month they undertook the first bombing mission, beginning operations with an attack on targets in the Dodecanese Islands (Greece).

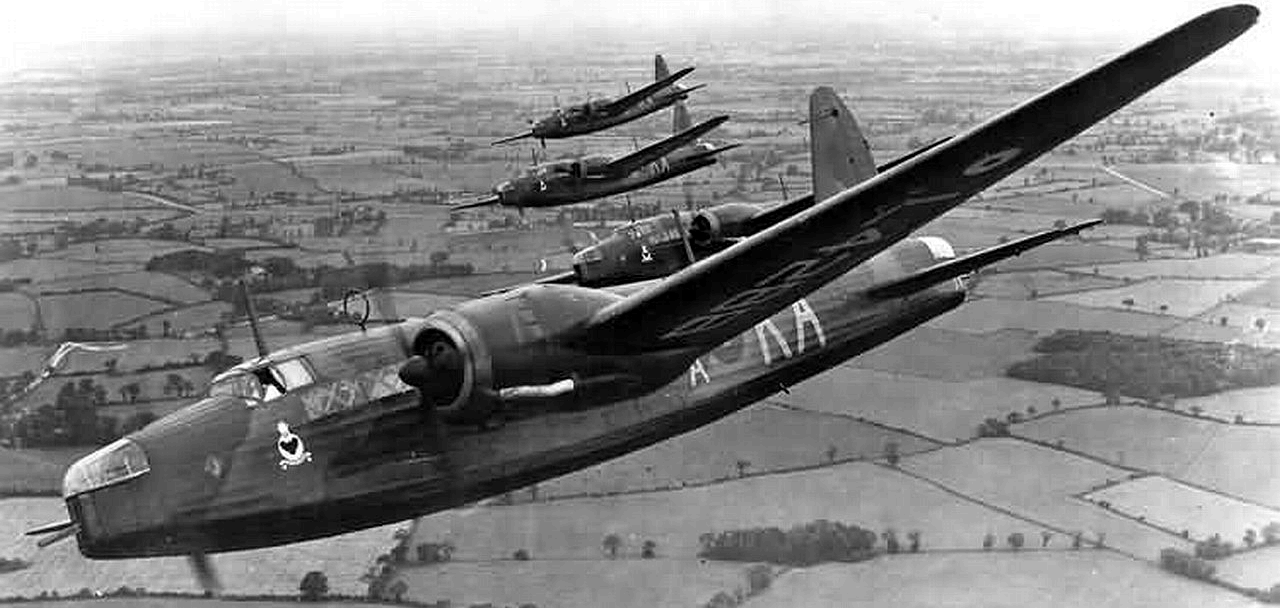
Vickers Wellington bombers in flight

In 1940 A detachment was sent to Tatoi Airport, just north of Athens, in support of Allied forces defending Greece and in 1941 the squadron was involved in the campaign to conquer Vichy-occupied Syria and the Rashid Ali rebellion in Iraq.

70 Squadron relocated frequently in support of the 8th Army's westward advance, first into Libya then Tunisia. In November 1943 it relocated to Djedeida 20 miles west of Tunis, putting industrial targets in the North of Italy within easy reach. Between December 1943 and October 1945 the squadron relocated to Tortorella Airfield, Italy where the Wellingtons were replaced by the long range Liberators.

=== Post Second World War ===
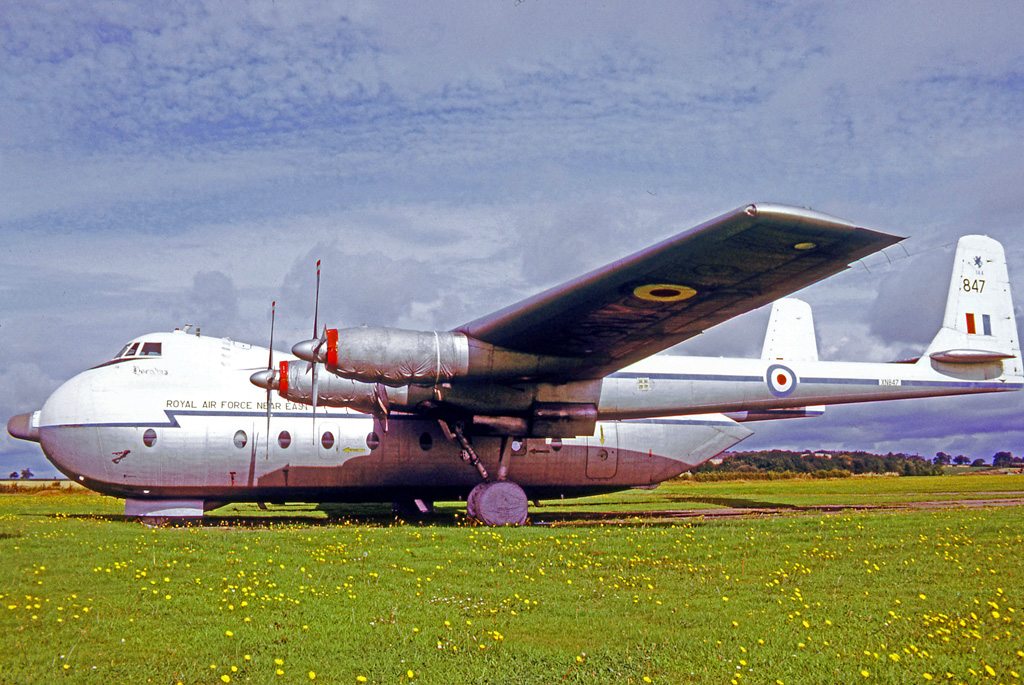
Armstrong Whitworth Argosy C.1 of 70 Squadron RAF named Horatius in 1971

The squadron disbanded in April 1947 and was reformed in May 1948, at RAF Kabrit, Egypt when No. 215 Squadron was renumbered No. 70 Squadron. The squadron was equipped with Douglas Dakotas until 1950, when it re-equipped with Vickers Valettas. In 1955, the squadron moved to RAF Nicosia, Cyprus and re-equipped with the Handley Page Hastings, Vickers Valetta and later used the Percival Pembroke twin engined communication aircraft. In 1966 the squadron moved to RAF Akrotiri. While there they won the Lord Trophy at RAF El Adem in competition with five other medium range transport squadrons. After a brief period operating Armstrong Whitworth Argosy C.1s, the squadron began conversion to the Lockheed C-130 Hercules in 1970, and moved to RAF Lyneham in 1975, after 55 years overseas. After 35 years of operating the Hercules C1/C3 from Lyneham, the squadron disbanded in September 2010.

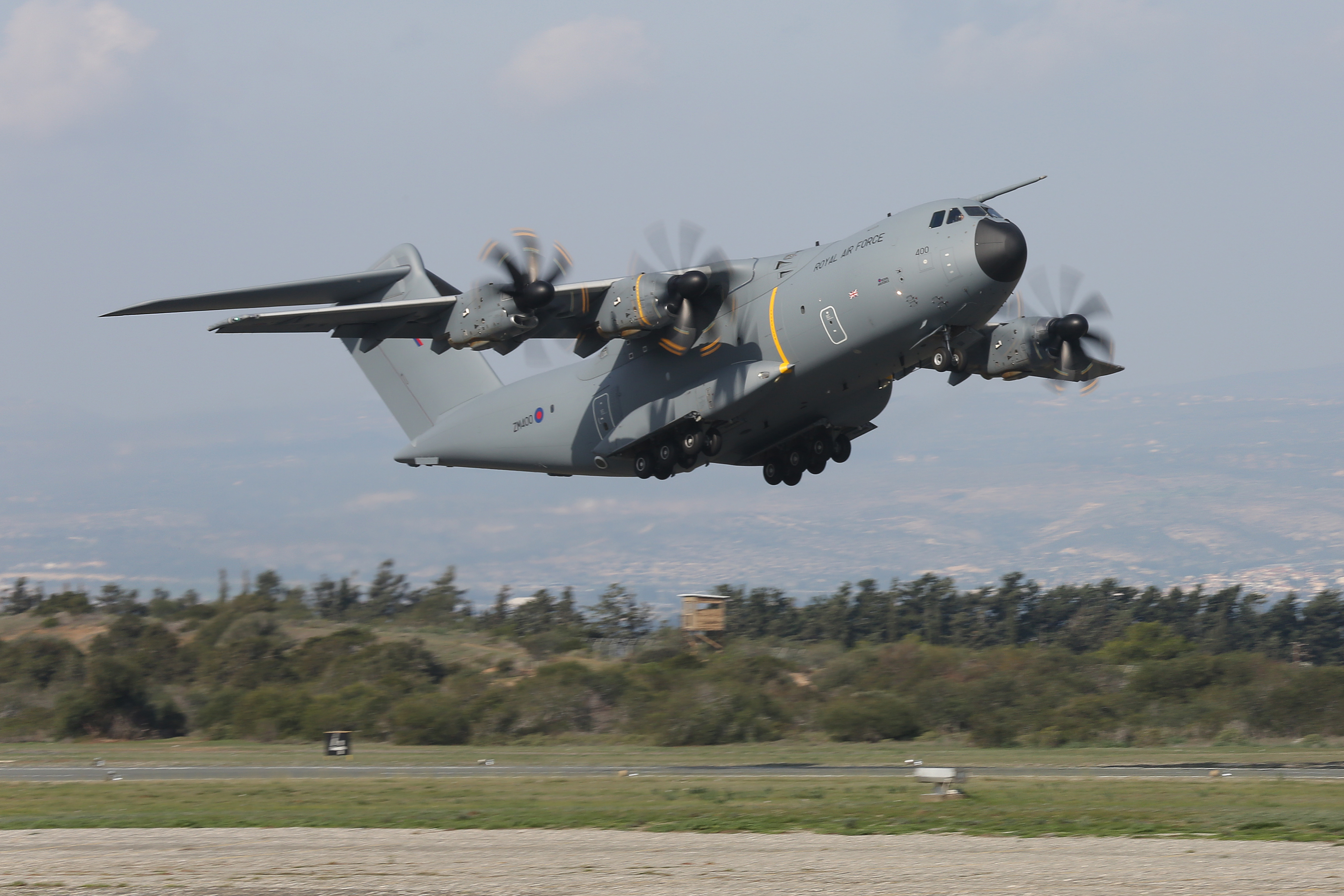
Royal Air Force A400M Atlas of LXX Squadron, taking off from RAF Akrotiri

The squadron reformed on 1 October 2014 and was officially "stood up" on 24 July 2015 by presentation with a new standard by Princess Anne becoming the Royal Air Force's first frontline A400M squadron.

In 2017 the squadron was part of Op Ruman, the humanitarian aid relief after Hurricane Irma.

In August 2021, the squadron was deployed forward Al Minhad Air Base in Dubai, United Arab Emirates, sending two aircraft to assist with Operation Pitting. This was the largest Royal Air Force airlift since the Berlin Airlift, helping to evacuate British Nationals and vulnerable Afghanis from Kabul Airport.

== Battle Honours ==
First World War	Western Front (1916–1918)*, Somme (1916)*, Arras, Ypres (1917), Somme (1918)
Inter-war years	Kurdistan (1922-1924), Iraq (1918–1929), Kurdistan (1930–1931), Northern Kurdistan (1932), North West Frontier (1937)
Second World War	Mediterranean (1940–1943), Egypt and Libya (1940–1943)*, Greece (1940–1941), Syria (1941), Iraq (1941)*, El Alamein, North Africa (1942–1943)*, El Hamma, Sicily (1943), *Italy (1943–1945)*, Salerno, Anzio and Nettuno, Gustav Line, Gothic Line, South East Europe (1944–1945)*
1946–2011	South Atlantic (1982), Gulf (1991), Iraq (2003–2011)

* Honours marked with an asterisk may be emblazoned on the Squadron Standard

== Aircraft operated ==
Dates	Aircraft	Variant	Notes
1916–1917	Sopwith 1½ Strutter		Single-engined biplane fighter
1917–1919	Sopwith Camel		Single-engined biplane fighter
1919	Sopwith Snipe		Single-engined biplane fighter
1920	Handley Page 0/400		Twin-engined biplane bomber
1920–1922	Vickers Vimy		Twin-engined biplane bomber
1922–1926	Vickers Vernon		Twin-engined biplane transport
1924–1926; 1926–1934; 1928–1934; 1930–1935; 1931–1935	Vickers Victoria	I III; IV; V V	Twin-engined biplane transport
1935–1940	Vickers Valentia		Twin-engined biplane transport
1940–1943; 1943–1945	Vickers Wellington	Ic; III; X	Twin-engined medium bomber
1945–1946	Consolidated Liberator	VI	Four-engined bomber
1946–1947	Avro Lancaster	B1(FE)	Four-engined bomber
1948–1950	Douglas Dakota		Twin-engined transport
1950–1956	Vickers Valetta	C1	Twin-engined transport
1956–1968	Handley Page Hastings	C1 and C2	Four-engined transport
1967–1975	Armstrong Whitworth Argosy	C1	Four-engined transport
1970–1980	Lockheed Hercules	C1	Four-engined transport
1980–2010	Lockheed Hercules	C1 and C3	Four-engined transport
2014–present	Airbus A400M Atlas	C1	Four-engined transport

== See also ==
- List of RAF squadrons
