= Frank Hobson =

British flying ace

- Born: 8 October 1894; Leeds, England
- Died: 5 May 1951 (aged 56); Leicester, England
- Military career
- Allegiance: United Kingdom
- Branch: British Army; Royal Air Force
- Rank: Captain
- Units: Royal Engineers; No.65 and 70 Squadron RFC
- Conflicts: First World War; Western Front
- Awards: Military Cross

Frank Hobson, MC (8 October 1894 – 5 May 1951) was a British flying ace of the First World War, credited with 15 aerial victories.

== Biography ==
Frank Hobson (note-not Frank Harold) was born in Leeds, Yorkshire on 8 October 1894, son of Walter Hobson, a pinafore manufacturer and his wife Kate nee Walley He attended Nottingham High School and Sawley Old Grammar School He originally served in the Royal Engineers as a Corporal Motorcycle despatch rider, but transferred to the Royal Flying Corps, being commissioned a temporary second lieutenant (on probation) on 10 May 1917. In September 1917, he scored his first victory while he was assigned to No. 65 Squadron RFC. Flying Sopwith Camel No. B2305, he drove down an Albatros D.V out of control. He then scored triumphs in every month between then and March 1918, except for February. A summary of his record shows ten enemy aircraft destroyed and five driven down out of control. He was awarded the Military Cross on 4 March 1918. Note that the biographical details given by The Aerodrome are incorrect, confusing him with Aircraftman 1st Class Frank Harold Hobson.

Following his last victory on 25 March 1918, Hobson was removed from combat duty and assigned to No. 72 Training Squadron in the Home Establishment in England. He ended his duty and left the service in February 1919. He was mentioned for valuable services in the Air Ministry List published 29 Aug 1919 After the war he became a driving instructor in Leicester. In 1939 he re-joined the RAF becoming a temporary Flight Lieutenant 1 January 1943. He was mentioned in Despatches in 1945 He died in Leicester on 5 May 1951. An obituary published in the Leicester Mercury, 5 May 1951, appears to contain a number of inaccuracies but states that he served during WW2 at Bawtry RAF station as a flight controller.

== Honours and awards ==
Military Cross
Temporary 2nd Lieutenant Frank Hobson, General List and Royal Flying Corps.

For conspicuous gallantry and devotion to duty. He has destroyed several enemy aeroplanes and driven others down out of control. On one occasion he descended to a height of 100 feet and attacked a party of the enemy with his machine gun, inflicting several casualties on them. He has shown splendid resource and determination on all occasions.
