= List of World War I aces credited with 20 or more victories =

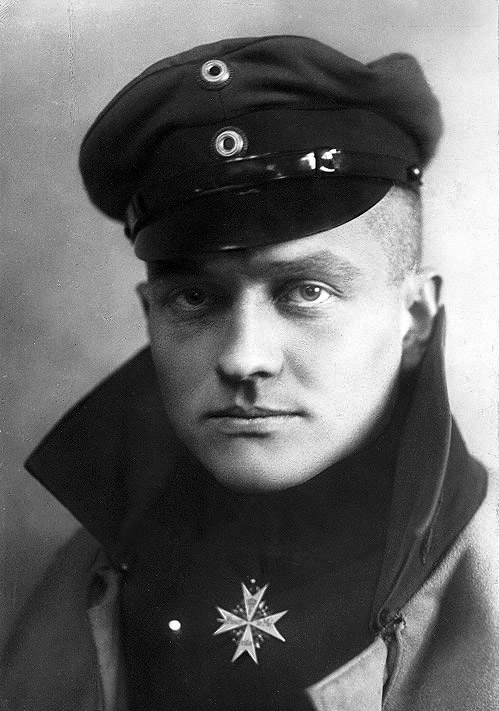
Manfred von Richthofen, the most successful flying ace of World War I wearing the Pour le Mérite, Prussia's highest military order in this official portrait, c. 1917

The term ace (now commonly flying ace) was first used by French newspapers during World War I, describing Adolphe Pégoud as l'as ('the ace'), after he downed five German aircraft. When aircraft began to shoot or force down other aircraft, systems to count "air victories" were subsequently developed. The American qualification of five victories eventually became the standard, even though other air services had previously used differing figures.

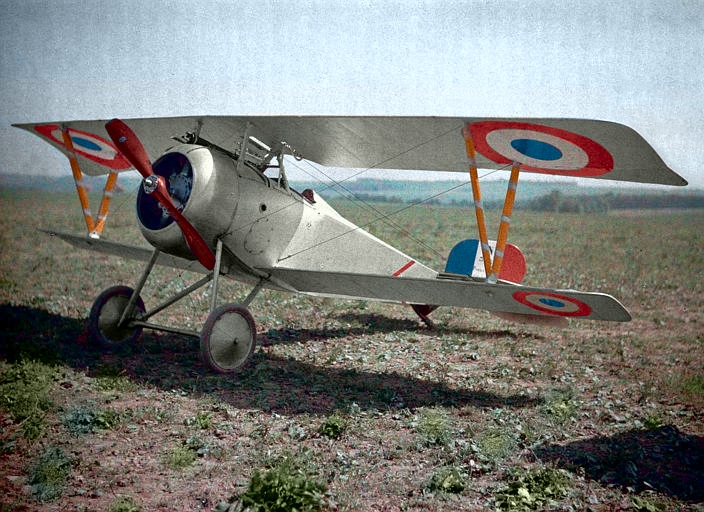
The Nieuport 17, a French biplane fighter aircraft from World War I

While "ace" status was most often won by fighter pilots, bomber and reconnaissance crews, and observers in two-seater aircraft such as the Bristol F.2b ("Bristol Fighter"), also destroyed enemy aircraft. If a two-seater aircraft destroyed an aircraft, both crew members were credited with a victory. Because pilots usually teamed with differing observer/gunners in two-seater aircraft, an observer might be an ace when his pilot was not, and vice versa. The few aces among combat aviators have historically accounted for the majority of air-to-air victories in military history.

Loss of records by mischance and the passage of time complicates reconstructing the actual count for given aces. The scores presented in the list cannot be definitive, but are based on itemized lists that are the best available sources of information. Aces are listed after verifying the date and location of combat, and the foe vanquished, for every victory accredited by an aviator's home air service using their own aerial victory standards. Those victories for which the evidence is unavailable or fragmentary have been excluded from the victory count.

== Aces ==
This along with the symbolic dagger †, indicates that the pilot was known to be either killed in action, missing in action, died of wounds, or killed in a flying accident during World War I.

Name	Country	Air service(s)	Victories	Note
Manfred von Richthofen†	German Empire	Luftstreitkräfte	80	The Red Baron; PLM plus 22 other awards
René Fonck	France	Aéronautique Militaire	75	Top Allied and French ace CdeLd'h, MM(Fr), CdeG, BCdeG, MC, MM.
Billy Bishop	Canada	Royal Flying Corps, Royal Air Force	72 (Note: Speculation about Bishop's claims, particularly his 2 June 1917 mission which earned him a Victoria Cross (VC), have persisted.)	Top Canadian and British Empire ace VC, CB, DSO*, MC, DFC.
Ernst Udet	German Empire	Luftstreitkräfte	62	PLM, HOH, IC
Mick Mannock†	United Kingdom	Royal Flying Corps, Royal Air Force	61	Top British ace VC DSO & Two Bars MC & Bar.
Raymond Collishaw	Canada	Royal Naval Air Service, Royal Air Force	60	Top Royal Naval Air Service ace DSO*, DSC, DFC, OSA, CdeG
James McCudden†	United Kingdom	Royal Flying Corps, Royal Air Force	57	VC, DSO*, MC*, MM, CdeG
Andrew Beauchamp-Proctor	South Africa	Royal Flying Corps, Royal Air Force	54	Top South African ace VC, DSO, MC*, DFC
Erich Loewenhardt†	German Empire	Luftstreitkräfte	54	PLM, IC
Donald MacLaren	Canada	Royal Flying Corps, Royal Air Force	54	DSO, MC*, CdeLd'h, CdeG
Georges Guynemer†	France	Aéronautique Militaire	53	CdeLd'h, MM(Fr), CdeG, DSO, OLII
William George Barker	Canada	Royal Flying Corps, Royal Air Force	50	VC, DSO*, MC**, MMV*(Silver), CdeG
Josef Jacobs	German Empire	Luftstreitkräfte	48	PLM, IC
Werner Voss†	German Empire	Luftstreitkräfte	48	PLM, HOH, IC
Robert A. Little†	Australia	Royal Naval Air Service, Royal Air Force	47	Top Australian ace DSO*, DSC*, CdeG
George McElroy†	United Kingdom	Royal Flying Corps, Royal Air Force	47	Top Irish ace MC**, DFC*
Fritz Rumey†	German Empire	Luftstreitkräfte	45	PLM, IC
Albert Ball†	United Kingdom	Royal Flying Corps	44	VC, DSO**, MC, OSG
Rudolf Berthold	German Empire	Luftstreitkräfte	44	PLM, MOSH, IC
Bruno Loerzer	German Empire	Luftstreitkräfte	44	PLM, HOH, IC
Paul Bäumer	German Empire	Luftstreitkräfte	43	PLM, MMC(P), IC, WB
Tom F. Hazell	United Kingdom	Royal Flying Corps, Royal Air Force	43	DSO, MC, DFC*
Charles Nungesser	France	Aéronautique Militaire	43	CdeLd'h, MM(Fr), CdeG, DSC, MC, BCdeG, DSC(US)
Georges Madon	France	Aéronautique Militaire	41	CdeLd'h, MM(Fr), CdeG
Oswald Bölcke†	German Empire	Luftstreitkräfte	40	PLM, IC
Franz Büchner	German Empire	Luftstreitkräfte	40	PLM, MOSH, HOH, IC
Philip F. Fullard	United Kingdom	Royal Flying Corps, Royal Air Force	40	DSO, MC*, AFC
Lothar von Richthofen	German Empire	Luftstreitkräfte	40	PLM, HOH, IC
Roderic Dallas†	Australia	Royal Naval Air Service, Royal Air Force	39 (Note: Although various claim-by-claim analyses ascribe Dallas a score of 32 aircraft shot down, he was officially credited with 39, and his actual tally could number in the 50s.)	DSO, DSC*
Charles George Gass	United Kingdom	Royal Flying Corps, Royal Air Force	39	Top observer ace MC
John Inglis Gilmour	United Kingdom	Royal Flying Corps, Royal Air Force	39	DSO, MC**
Heinrich Gontermann†	German Empire	Luftstreitkräfte	39	PLM, HOH, MOMJ, IC
William Lancelot Jordan	South Africa	Royal Naval Air Service, Royal Air Force	39	DSC*, DFC
Carl Menckhoff	German Empire	Luftstreitkräfte	39	PLM, HOH, IC
Alfred Atkey	Canada	Royal Flying Corps, Royal Air Force	38	Leading 2 seater pilot of war MC*
William Gordon Claxton	Canada	Royal Flying Corps, Royal Air Force	37	DSO, DFC*
Willy Coppens	Belgium	Belgian Military Aviation	37	Top Belgian and balloon busting ace of war OL, OWE, OC, CdeG, BCdeG, CdeLd'H, DSO, MC
James Ira Thomas Jones	United Kingdom	Royal Flying Corps, Royal Air Force	37	DSO, MC, DFC*, MM
Carl Bolle	German Empire	Luftstreitkräfte	36	PLM, HOH, IC
Julius Buckler	German Empire	Luftstreitkräfte	36	PLM, MMC(P), IC, sole award of Gold WB
Joseph Stewart Temple Fall	Canada	Royal Naval Air Service, Royal Air Force	36	DFC**, AFC
Max Ritter von Müller†	German Empire	Luftstreitkräfte	36	PLM, MOMJ, IC
Maurice Boyau†	France	Aéronautique Militaire	35	CdeLd'h, MM(Fr), CdeG
Godwin von Brumowski	Austria-Hungary	Luftfahrtruppen	35	Top Austro-Hungarian ace OIC, OL, MFB, MMM, IC
Gustav Dörr	German Empire	Luftstreitkräfte	35	MMC(P), IC
Otto Könnecke	German Empire	Luftstreitkräfte	35	PLM, MMC(P), HOH, IC
Frederick McCall	Canada	Royal Flying Corps, Royal Air Force	35	DSO, MC*, DFC
Eduard Ritter von Schleich	German Empire	Luftstreitkräfte	35	PLM, IC, MOMJ
Emil Thuy	German Empire	Luftstreitkräfte	35	PLM, HOH, IC
Josef Veltjens	German Empire	Luftstreitkräfte	35	PLM, HOH, IC
Henry Winslow Woollett	United Kingdom	Royal Flying Corps, Royal Air Force	35	DSO, MC*, CdeLd'h
Francesco Baracca†	Italy	Corpo Aeronautico Militare	34	Top Italian ace MMV(Gold), MMV**(Silver), MC, CdeG, OC
Michel Coiffard†	France	Aéronautique Militaire	34	CdeLd'h, MM(Fr), MC
Heinrich Bongartz	German Empire	Luftstreitkräfte	33	PLM, HOH, IC
Heinrich Kroll	German Empire	Luftstreitkräfte	33	PLM, HOH, IC
Frank Granger Quigley†	Canada	Royal Flying Corps, Royal Air Force	33	DSO, MC*
Kurt Wolff†	German Empire	Luftstreitkräfte	33	PLM, HOH, IC
Julius Arigi	Austria-Hungary	Luftfahrtruppen	32	MFB (1 gold and 4 silver)
Geoffrey Hilton Bowman	United Kingdom	Royal Flying Corps, Royal Air Force	32	DSO, MC*, DFC
Hermann Frommherz	German Empire	Luftstreitkräfte	32	MOSH, IC
Samuel Kinkead	South Africa	Royal Naval Air Service, Royal Air Force	32	DSO, DSC*, DFC*
Theodor Osterkamp	German Empire	Marinefliegerkorps	32	Also World War II ace PLM, IC
Paul Billik	German Empire	Luftstreitkräfte	31	IC
Andrew Edward McKeever	Canada	Royal Flying Corps, Royal Air Force, Canadian Air Force	31	Top two-seater ace for UK; DSO, MC*, DFC
Gotthard Sachsenberg	German Empire	Marinefliegerkorps	31	PLM, HOH, IC
Karl Allmenröder†	German Empire	Luftstreitkräfte	30	PLM, HOH, IC
Carl Degelow	German Empire	Luftstreitkräfte	30	PLM, HOH, IC
Josef Mai	German Empire	Luftstreitkräfte	30	IC
Ulrich Neckel	German Empire	Luftstreitkräfte	30	PLM, IC
Karl Emil Schäfer†	German Empire	Luftstreitkräfte	30	PLM, HOH, IC
Samuel Frederick Henry Thompson†	United Kingdom	Royal Flying Corps, Royal Air Force	30	MC, DFC
Harald Auffarth	German Empire	Luftstreitkräfte	29 (Note: Auffarth may actually 31.)	HOH, IC, WB
Charles Dawson Booker†	United Kingdom	Royal Naval Air Service, Royal Air Force	29	DSC, CdeG
Percy Jack Clayson	United Kingdom	Royal Flying Corps, Royal Air Force	29	MC, DFC
Harry Cobby	Australia	Australian Flying Corps	29	DSO, DFC**
Leonard Henry Rochford	United Kingdom	Royal Naval Air Service, Royal Air Force	29	DSC*, DFC*
Walter Blume	German Empire	Luftstreitkräfte	28	PLM, IC
Léon Bourjade	France	Aéronautique Militaire	28	CdeLd'h, CdeG
Walter von Bülow-Bothkamp†	German Empire	Luftstreitkräfte	28	PLM, MOSH, IC
Albert Desbrisay Carter†	Canada	Royal Flying Corps, Royal Air Force	28	DSO*, CdeG
Benno Fiala Ritter von Fernbrugg	Austria-Hungary	Luftfahrtruppen	28	OIC, OL, MMC(AH), MMM, MFB, IC
Robert Ritter von Greim	German Empire	Luftstreitkräfte	28	PLM, IC, MOMJ
John Everard Gurdon	United Kingdom	Royal Flying Corps, Royal Air Force	28	DFC
Reginald Hoidge	Canada	Royal Flying Corps, Royal Air Force	28	MC*
Dennis Latimer	United Kingdom	Royal Flying Corps, Royal Air Force	28	MC, DFC
Arthur Laumann	German Empire	Luftstreitkräfte	28	PLM, HOH, IC
Friedrich Ritter von Röth	German Empire	Luftstreitkräfte	28	PLM, HOH, IC, MOMJ
Fritz Otto Bernert	German Empire	Luftstreitkräfte	27	PLM, IC
Otto Fruhner	German Empire	Luftstreitkräfte	27	MMC(P), IC
Hans Kirschstein†	German Empire	Luftstreitkräfte	27	PLM, HOH, IC
Frank Linke-Crawford†	Austria-Hungary	Luftfahrtruppen	27	OIC
Clifford McEwen	Canada	Royal Flying Corps, Royal Air Force	27	MC, DFC*, MMV
Thomas Percy Middleton	United Kingdom	Royal Flying Corps	27	DFC
Armand Pinsard	France	Aéronautique Militaire	27	CdeLd'h, MM(Fr), CdeG, MC
Arthur Rhys Davids†	United Kingdom	Royal Flying Corps	27	DSO, MC*
Frank Ormond Soden	Canada	Royal Flying Corps, Royal Air Force	27	DFC*
Karl Thom	German Empire	Luftstreitkräfte	27	PLM, MMC(P), HOH, IC
Adolf Ritter von Tutschek†	German Empire	Luftstreitkräfte	27	PLM, HOH, IC, MOMJ
Arthur Whealy	Canada	Royal Naval Air Service, Royal Air Force	27	DSC*, DFC
Kurt Wüsthoff	German Empire	Luftstreitkräfte	27	PLM, HOH, IC
Oskar Freiherr von Boenigk	German Empire	Luftstreitkräfte	26	PLM, IC
Eduard Ritter von Dostler†	German Empire	Luftstreitkräfte	26	PLM, HOH, IC, MOMJ
Ronald Malcolm Fletcher	United Kingdom	Royal Flying Corps	26	Observer ace DFM
William Frederick James Harvey	United Kingdom	Royal Flying Corps	26	MC, DFC*
Elwyn King	Australia	Australian Flying Corps	26	DSO, DFC
Gerald Joseph Constable Maxwell	United Kingdom	Royal Flying Corps	26	DFC, MC, AFC
Max Näther†	German Empire	Luftstreitkräfte	26	HOH, IC
Eddie Rickenbacker	United States	US Army Air Service	26	Top US ace MOH, DSC(US), CdeLd'h, CdeG
Silvio Scaroni	Italy	Corpo Aeronautico Militare	26	MMV(Gold), MMV*(Silver)
William Ernest Staton	United Kingdom	Royal Flying Corps	26	DSO*, MC, DFC*
William McKenzie Thomson	Canada	Royal Flying Corps, Royal Air Force	26	MC, DFC
Olivier Freiherr von Beaulieu-Marconnay†	German Empire	Luftstreitkräfte	25	PLM, IC
Keith Caldwell	New Zealand	Royal Flying Corps, Royal Air Force	25	Top New Zealander ace MC, DFC*
Robert J. O. Compston	United Kingdom	Royal Flying Corps	25	DSC**, DFC
Georg von Hantelmann	German Empire	Luftstreitkräfte	25	HOH, IC
Fritz Pütter†	German Empire	Luftstreitkräfte	25	PLM, IC
Stanley Wallace Rosevear†	Canada	Royal Naval Air Service, Royal Air Force	25	DSC*
Erwin Böhme†	German Empire	Luftstreitkräfte	24	PLM, HOH, IC
Peter Carpenter	United Kingdom	Royal Flying Corps, Royal Air Force	24	DSO, MC*, MMV
George S. L. Hayward	United Kingdom	Royal Flying Corps	24	Observer ace MC
Harry G. E. Luchford†	United Kingdom	Royal Flying Corps	24	MC*
Georg Meyer	German Empire	Luftstreitkräfte	24	IC
Tom Cecil Noel†	United Kingdom	Royal Flying Corps, Royal Air Force	24	Observer ace. All victories in 1918; MC*. First MC awarded while junior infantry officer.
Pier Ruggero Piccio	Italy	Corpo Aeronautico Militare	24	MMV**(Silver)
William Ernest Shields	Canada	Royal Flying Corps, Royal Air Force	24	DFC*
James Anderson Slater	United Kingdom	Royal Flying Corps	24	MC*, DFC
William Melville Alexander	Canada	Royal Naval Air Service, Royal Air Force	23	DSC
Hermann Becker	German Empire	Luftstreitkräfte	23	HOH, IC
William Charles Campbell	United Kingdom	Royal Flying Corps	23	DSO, MC*
René Dorme†	France	Aéronautique Militaire	23	CdeLd'h, MM(Fr), CdeG
Matthew Brown Frew	United Kingdom	Royal Flying Corps, Royal Air Force	23	DSO, MC*, AFC, MMV
Gabriel Guerin†	France	Aéronautique Militaire	23	CdeLd'h, MM(Fr), CdeG
Howard Percy Lale	United Kingdom	Royal Flying Corps	23	DSO, DFC*
Alexander Pentland	Australia	Royal Flying Corps, Royal Air Force	23	MC, DFC
Harold Whistler	United Kingdom	Royal Flying Corps	23	DSO, DFC*
Hermann Göring	German Empire	Luftstreitkräfte	22	PLM, HOH, IC
Thomas Sinclair Harrison	South Africa	Royal Flying Corps	22	DFC*, BCdeG
Marcel Haegelen	France	Aéronautique Militaire	22	CdeLd'h, MM(Fr), CdeG
Louis Fleeming Jenkin†	United Kingdom	Royal Flying Corps	22	MC*
Cecil Frederick King†	United Kingdom	Royal Flying Corps	22	MC, DFC, CdeG
Hans Klein	German Empire	Luftstreitkräfte	22	PLM, HOH, IC
John Leacroft	United Kingdom	Royal Flying Corps	22	MC*
Arthur Ernest Newland	United Kingdom	Royal Air Force	22	Observer ace DFM*
Hans Martin Pippart†	German Empire	Luftstreitkräfte	22	IC
Werner Preuss	German Empire	Luftstreitkräfte	22	HOH, IC
Pierre Marinovitch	France	Aéronautique Militaire	22	CdeLd'h, MM(Fr), CdeG
Benjamin Roxburgh-Smith	United Kingdom	Royal Flying Corps	22	DFC*, BCdeG
Karl Schlegel†	German Empire	Luftstreitkräfte	22	IC
Joseph Leonard Maries White	Canada	Royal Flying Corps, Royal Air Force	22	DFC*, BCdeG
Rudolf Windisch†	German Empire	Luftstreitkräfte	22	PLM, HOH, IC
Hans von Adam†	German Empire	Luftstreitkräfte	21	HOH
Friedrich Altemeier	German Empire	Luftstreitkräfte	21	MMC(P), IC, WB
Flavio Baracchini	Italy	Corpo Aeronautico Militare	21	MMV(Gold)
Francis Cubbon†	United Kingdom	Royal Flying Corps	21	Observer ace MC*
Harold Leslie Edwards	Canada	Royal Air Force	21	DFC, MM
Friedrich Friedrichs†	German Empire	Luftstreitkräfte	21	PLM, HOH, IC
Alfred Heurtaux	France	Aéronautique Militaire	21	CdeLd'h, CdeG
Charles Hickey†	Canada	Royal Naval Air Service, Royal Air Force	21	DFC*
Fritz Höhn†	German Empire	Luftstreitkräfte	21	HOH, IC
William John Charles Kennedy-Cochran-Patrick	United Kingdom	Royal Flying Corps	21	DSO, MC*
Richard Maybery†	United Kingdom	Royal Flying Corps	21	MC
Edgar McCloughry	Australia	Australian Flying Corps	21	DSO, DFC*
Richard Minifie	Australia	Royal Naval Air Service	21	DSC**
Friedrich T. Noltenius	German Empire	Luftstreitkräfte	21	HOH, IC
George Edwin Thomson†	United Kingdom	Royal Flying Corps	21	DSO, MC, DFC
Leonard Monteagle Barlow†	United Kingdom	Royal Flying Corps	20	MC**
Douglas John Bell†	South Africa	Royal Flying Corps	20	MC*
Hans Bethge	German Empire	Luftstreitkräfte	20	HOH, IC
Kenneth Burns Conn	Canada	Royal Flying Corps, Royal Air Force	20	DFC
Albert Deullin	France	Aéronautique Militaire	20	CdeLd'h, CdeG
Rudolf von Eschwege†	German Empire	Luftstreitkräfte	20	HOH, IC, Bulgarian Order for Bravery in War
Wilhelm Frankl†	German Empire	Luftstreitkräfte	20	PLM, HOH, IC
Hans von Freden	German Empire	Luftstreitkräfte	20	IC
Francis W. Gillet	United States	Royal Flying Corps, Royal Air Force	20	DFC*, BCdeG
Walter Göttsch†	German Empire	Luftstreitkräfte	20	HOH, IC
Oskar Hennrich	German Empire	Luftstreitkräfte	20	MMC, IC
Edgar Johnston	Australia	Australian Flying Corps	20	DFC
Alexander Kazakov	Russia	Imperial Army Air Service	20	Top Russian ace OSG, OSV, OSS, OSA, DSO, MC, DFC, CdeLd'h, CdeG
Otto Kissenberth	German Empire	Luftstreitkräfte	20	PLM, HOH, IC
Camille Lagesse	Canada	Royal Flying Corps, Royal Air Force	20	DFC*
Ian Donald Roy McDonald	United Kingdom	Royal Flying Corps	20	MC, DFC
Keith Park	New Zealand	Royal Flying Corps, Royal Air Force	20	MC*, DFC, CdeG
Wilhelm Reinhard†	German Empire	Luftstreitkräfte	20	HOH, IC
Charles G. Ross	South Africa	Royal Flying Corps, Royal Air Force, South African Air Force	20	CBE, DFC*, BCdeG
Fulco Ruffo di Calabria	Italy	Corpo Aeronautico Militare	20	MMV(Gold), MMV*(Silver), MMV***(Bronze)
Otto Schmidt	German Empire	Luftstreitkräfte	20	HOH, IC
Walter Southey	South Africa	Royal Flying Corps	20	DFC
Frederick Thayre†	United Kingdom	Royal Flying Corps	20	MC*

== Analysis ==
Group	Country	Pilots	Victories	Vic/Pil	Rank
Allied	Australia	8	226	28.25	8
Central Powers	Austria-Hungary	4	122	30.50	5
Allied	Belgium	1	37	37.00	1
Allied	Canada	24	785	32.71	3
Allied	France	14	467	33.36	2
Central Powers	German Empire	75	2296	30.61	4
Allied	Italy	5	125	25.00	9
Allied	New Zealand	2	45	22.50	11
Allied	Russia	1	20	20.00	12
Allied	South Africa	7	207	29.57	6
Allied	United Kingdom	45	1296	28.80	7
Allied	United States	2	46	23.00	10

Grouping	Pilots	Victories	Vic/Pil
Central Powers	79	2418	30.61
Allied	109	3254	29.85
TOTAL	188	5672	30.17
