= List of aerial victories of Fritz Höhn =

Fritz Höhn (1896-1918) was a German First World War fighter ace credited with 21 confirmed aerial victories. As one of the few pilots courageous enough to be a balloon buster, he destroyed ten of the crucial artillery direction posts, as well as we11 as 11 enemy airplanes. He scored his victories flying for four different fighter squadrons, the last three of which he commanded.

== The victory list ==
Fritz Höhn's victories are reported in chronological order, which is not necessarily the order or dates the victories were confirmed by headquarters.

No.	Date	Time	Foe	Unit	Location
1	1 December 1917		Bréguet 14		Southwest of Chattencourt
2	11 April 1918	1145 hours	Observation balloon (Note: Observation balloons, which granted wide fields of view to aerial observers, were vital assets for directing artillery barrages on the enemy. As such, they were primary targets for aerial attack to destroy them, and were heavily defended by antiaircraft cannons and machine guns, as well as fighter patrols (per Guttman, pp. 7-9).)	33e Compagnie de Aerostiers, Service Aéronautique	Merval, France
3	12 April 1918	0915 hours	Observation balloon		Southwest of Staubecken
4	12 April 1918	1815 hours	SPAD		South of Selens, France
5	20 April 1918	1405 hours	Observation balloon	75e Compagnie de Aerostiers, Service Aéronautique	South of Noyon, France
6	20 April 1918	1900 hours	Observation balloon	45e Compagnie de Aerostiers, Service Aéronautique	South of Chemin des Dames
7	20 August 1918	1725 hours	French observation balloon		South of Braisne, France
8	21 August 1918	1630 hours	Bréguet 14		South of Soissons, France
9	22 August 1918	1430 hours	Observation balloon		Selens, France
10	24 August 1918	1830 hours	SPAD		Northwest of Soissons, France
11	2 September 1918		SPAD		Courcy le Chateau, France
12	3 September 1918		SPAD		
13	15 September 1918		Observation balloon		
14	26 September 1918	0830 hours	SPAD two-seater		Somme-Py, France
15	28 September 1918	1215 hours	Observation balloon	21e Compagnie de Aerostiers, Service Aéronautique	Miraucourt
16	27 September 1918	1820 hurs	SPAD two-seater		Marfaux, France
17	28 September 1918	0810 hours	Observation balloon	67e Compagnie de Aerostiers, Service Aéronautique	Tahure, france
18	28 September 1918	0830 hours	Observation balloon	6th United States Balloon Company, USAAS	Béthelainville, France
19	1 October 1918		Enemy airplane		
20	2 October 1918		Enemy airplane		
21	3 October 1918		Enemy airplane		

Abbreviations were expanded by the editor creating this list.

== Sources ==
- Franks, Norman; Bailey, Frank; Guest, Russell (1993). Above the Lines: The Aces and Fighter Units of the German Air Service, Naval Air Service and Flanders Marine Corps, 1914–1918. London UK: Grub Street Publishing. ISBN 978-0-948817-73-1.
- Guttman, Jon (2005). Balloon-Busting Aces of World War 1. Oxford UK: Osprey Publishing. ISBN 978-1-84176-877-9.
