= Tom F. Hazell =

Flying Ace and Royal Air Force Squadron Leader (1892-1946)

Thomas Falcon Hazell
- Born: 7 August 1892; Roundstone, County Galway, Ireland
- Died: 4 September 1946 (aged 54); Newport, County Mayo, Ireland
- Burial place: Burrishoole Church of Ireland Cemetery, Newport, County Mayo, Ireland
- Military career
- Allegiance: United Kingdom
- Branch: British Army; Royal Air Force
- Service years: 1914–1927
- Rank: Squadron leader
- Units: South Irish Horse; Royal Inniskilling Fusiliers; No. 1 Squadron RFC; No. 24 Squadron RAF
- Commands: No. 203 Squadron RAF; No. 55 Squadron RAF; No. 45 Squadron RAF; No. 111 Squadron RAF
- Conflicts: World War I; Western Front; World War II
- Awards: Distinguished Service Order; Military Cross; Distinguished Flying Cross & Bar

Thomas Falcon Hazell DSO, MC, DFC & Bar (7 August 1892 – 4 September 1946) was a fighter pilot with the Royal Flying Corps, and later, the Royal Air Force during the First World War. Hazell scored 43 victories in 1917–18 making him the fifth most successful British "flying ace" of the war, and the third most successful Irish-born pilot, behind Edward Mannock and George McElroy, as well the only pilot to survive the war from both groups.

== Early life ==
Hazell was born in Roundstone, County Galway, on the west coast of Ireland, to Thomas Hazell and Cecile Buckley (daughter of VC recipient Cecil Buckley). He attended Tonbridge School until 1911.

== First World War ==
Upon the outbreak of the war in August 1914, Hazell volunteered for service as a private with the South Irish Horse. On 10 October he was commissioned as second lieutenant in the 7th Battalion, Royal Inniskilling Fusiliers. As part of the 49th Brigade in the 16th (Irish) Division, the 7th Inniskillings were initially based at Tipperary, where Hazell was promoted to lieutenant on 4 June 1915. His regiment moved to Finner Camp in August 1915, and moved to Woking in England in September. The regiment landed in France in February 1916.

Soon after Hazell transferred to the Royal Flying Corps. In April and May he was assigned to No. 5 Reserve Squadron, based at Castle Bromwich. He was appointed a flying officer on 5 June, and survived a severe crash before completing his training, and eventually joined No. 1 Squadron on the Western Front. Flying Nieuport 17 Scouts, he shot down 20 enemy aircraft between March and August 1917, being appointed a flight commander with the acting rank of captain on 25 May, and was awarded the Military Cross on 26 July. His citation read:

Temporary Lieutenant Thomas Falcon Hazell, General List and Royal Flying Corps. For conspicuous gallantry and devotion to duty. On several occasions he displayed marked courage and determination in attacking and destroying hostile aircraft.

Between 25 May and 25 June 1918 he served as an instructor at the Central Flying School, with the acting rank of major. He then took command of "A" Flight, No. 24 Squadron, flying the S.E.5a. On 22 August 1918, Hazell shot down an observation balloon despite its escort of seven Fokker D.VIIs. The escort was led by German ace Ernst Udet, who attacked and riddled Hazell's petrol tank, propeller, and two longerons with bullets. In spite of this Hazell fought his way back, eyes full of petrol, and landed safely. Udet thought that he had forced the British pilot to crash, and actually claimed him as his 60th victory. Hazell finished the war with 43 confirmed kills, the top British surviving ace of the 1914–18 war (excluding Dominion airmen).

His claims tally consisted of one captured enemy aircraft; ten enemy observation balloons destroyed (two of which were shared); 18 enemy aircraft destroyed (including one shared); and fourteen aircraft driven down 'out of control' (including three shared).

Hazell was twice awarded the Distinguished Flying Cross, and both were gazetted on 2 November 1918. His citations read:

Lieutenant (Temporary Captain) Tom Falcon Hazell, MC. This officer is conspicuous for his bravery and skill, having destroyed twenty enemy machines and four kite balloons. On one occasion, while attacking troops on the ground, he observed seven enemy scouts above him; he at once engaged them, shooting down one out of control. Some days later he, with another pilot, attacked a kite balloon, driving it down in flames; they then attacked a second balloon, driving it down in a deflated condition.

Lieutenant (Temporary Captain) Tom Falcon Hazell, MC, DFC. This officer has accounted for twenty-seven enemy machines and four kite balloons. On the 8th August he shot down two machines out of control, and destroyed a third in the air. In these combats he was so heavily engaged that all his instruments were wrecked, and only one strand of his elevator control cable was intact. Relentless in attack, Capt. Hazell displays disregard of personal danger in a marked degree.

On 22 October he was appointed a squadron commander with the acting rank of major, taking command of No. 203 Squadron, flying Sopwith Camels, remaining there until 2 April 1919.

On 8 February 1919 he was awarded the Distinguished Service Order. His citation read:

Captain (Acting Major) Tom Falcon Hazell, MC, DFC. A brilliant fighter, distinguished for his bold determination and rare courage, he has accounted for twenty-nine enemy machines, twenty being destroyed and nine driven down out of control; he has also destroyed ten balloons. On 4th September he rendered exceptionally valuable service in leading his flight to attack hostile balloons that were making a certain road impassable. Within an hour three of these balloons were destroyed, Major Hazell accounting for two.

== Post-war career ==
On 1 August 1919 Hazell was granted a permanent commission in the Royal Air Force as a captain, returning to No. 24 Squadron. In June 1920 he took part in the RAF's Aerial Pageant at Hendon, in which he shot down a kite balloon from a Sopwith Snipe.

He was promoted from flight lieutenant to squadron leader on 30 June 1922, and commanded No. 55 Squadron, and briefly No. 45 Squadron, as part of Iraq Command. On 22 July 1923 he was posted to the RAF Depot, on his return to the Home Establishment. On 1 December 1923 he was appointed to command of No. 111 Squadron, based at Duxford. On 11 June 1927 he returned to the RAF Depot at Uxbridge, and on 20 July was placed on the retired list at his own request.

== Later life and death ==
In 1944, at the age of 52, Hazell became the commander of "D" Company, 24th (Tettenhall) Battalion, South Staffordshire Home Guard during the later part of the Second World War.

Hazell died in Newport, County Mayo, Ireland, on 4 September 1946, and is buried at the Burrishoole Church of Ireland Cemetery there. In 2014 his grave, which had been largely forgotten and neglected, was restored, repaired, and re-dedicated in a ceremony which was held on 4 August 2014, the 100th anniversary of the declaration of the First World War.

== See also ==
- List of World War I aces credited with 20 or more victories
