= Thomas Sinclair Harrison =

- Born: 8 January 1898; King William Town, Cape Colony
- Died: Unknown
- Military career
- Allegiance: British Empire
- Branch: South African Army; British Army; Royal Air Force
- Rank: Major
- Unit: No. 29 Squadron RAF
- Conflicts: World War I • Western Front; World War II • East African Campaign
- Awards: Distinguished Flying Cross & Bar; Croix de guerre (Belgium)

Major Thomas Sinclair Harrison DFC* (born 8 January 1898 in Cape Colony) was a World War I fighter ace credited with 22 aerial victories. He was a balloon buster, as he destroyed two enemy observation balloons. This made him the fourth highest scoring South African.

== Military service ==
Harrison originally served with an artillery regiment in German East Africa. He then joined the Royal Flying Corps in April 1917. From cadet he was commissioned as a temporary second lieutenant (on probation) on 12 August 1917, and was confirmed in his rank and appointed a flying officer on 12 March 1918.

In May he was assigned to No. 29 Squadron RAF. His timing was impeccable; the squadron was newly equipped with brand new RAF SE.5as. Beginning his victories the following month, he became the squadron's leading ace out of 26. While his 22 triumphs did not make up an overpowering part of the squadron's 385 victories, he was a steady scorer.

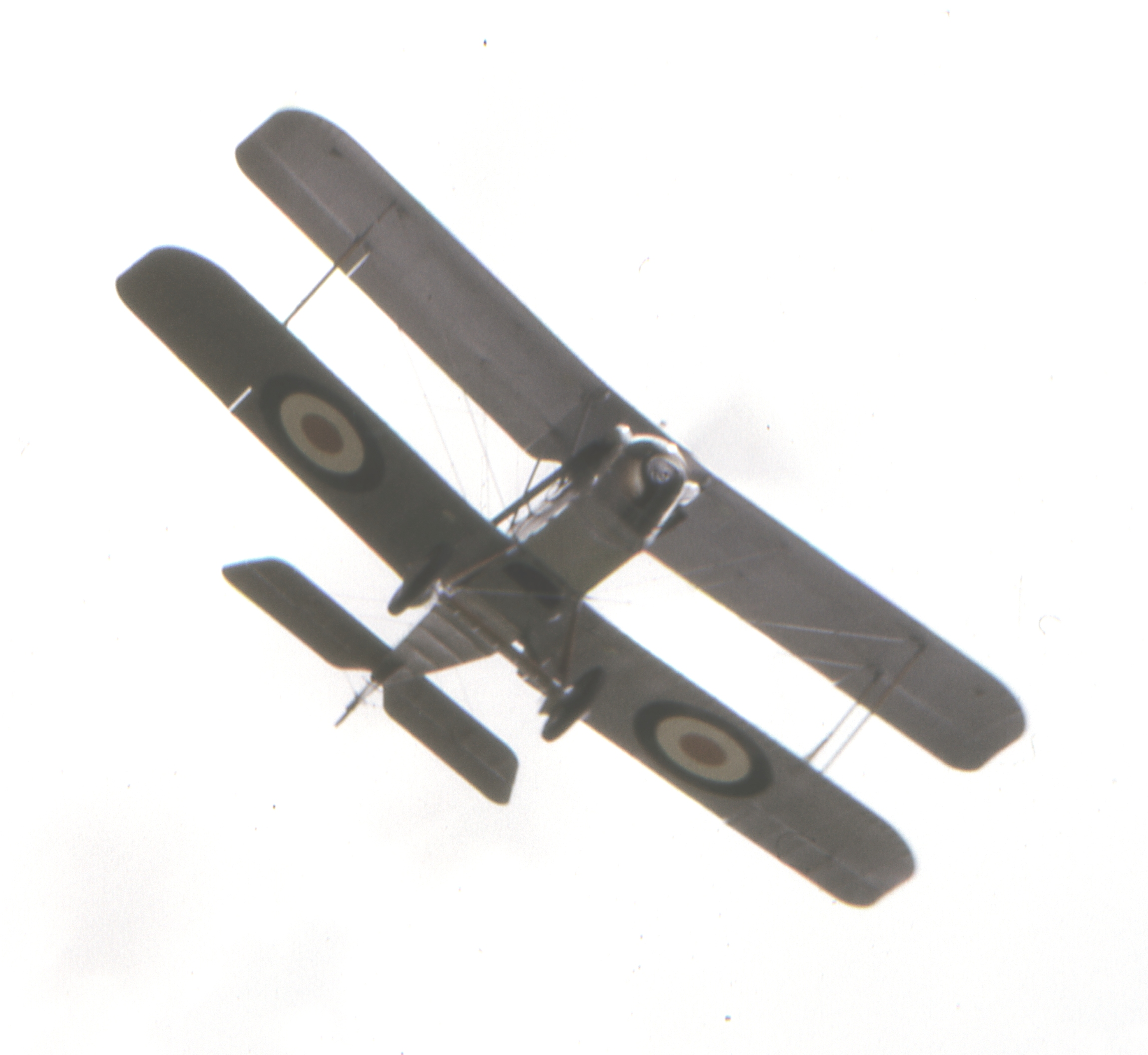
A surviving SE5a, such as Harrison flew, in flight.

His first victory was on 27 June 1918, when he flamed a Halberstadt C, using RAF SE.5a serial 8859 to deadly effect. He destroyed a Hannover C on 1 July. On 4 July, he was flying a signals intelligence sortie of "wireless interception duty," in SE.5a serial 3915. He destroyed the LVG carrying the airborne radio, and burned one of its pair of escort Pfalz D.IIIs. He was awarded his Distinguished Flying Cross for this mission.

On 8 July, he became an ace. By the middle of August, he was a double ace, scoring his tenth win on 13 August 1918. Two of these victories were over balloons. He ended August at an even dozen.

By now, he had a favourite plane, serial number E5947. He would run off a series of seven victories in it, with the last being his 13th win on 6 September 1918. A squadron-mate then ruined it with a fast hard landing.

In four different aircraft, Harrison scored six times in October, before being appointed a flight commander with the acting-rank of captain on the 29th, and three more times in November, his last on the 10th, the day before the armistice.

His 22 victories tallied 13 enemy aircraft destroyed single-handed, four of which burned; two destroyed in conjunction with another pilot; four planes driven down out of control; two balloons destroyed single-handed.

Harrison was awarded the Belgian Croix de guerre in July 1919.

== World War II service ==
Harrison returned to military service during World War II as an intelligence officer in the South African Air Force, serving in Air Headquarters East Africa during the East African Campaign in 1941.

== Honours and awards ==
Distinguished Flying Cross
Lieutenant Thomas Sinclair Harrison.

When on wireless interception duty this officer engaged three enemy machines, shooting down one in flames. He was then attacked by three scouts and a two-seater; the latter he shot down. During the last few weeks he has further accounted for three hostile aeroplanes and a balloon, displaying vigour and gallantry in attack.

Bar to the Distinguished Flying Cross
Lieutenant Thomas Sinclair Harrison, DFC.

Bold in attack, skilful in manoeuvre, this officer never hesitates to engage the enemy, however superior in numbers. On 2 October he, with three other machines, took part in an engagement with eight Fokkers; four of these were destroyed, Lieut. Harrison accounting for one. On another occasion he, in company with four others, engaged a large formation of Fokkers; three of these were destroyed, one by this officer. In all he has destroyed twenty enemy machines.

== See also ==
- List of World War I aces credited with 20 or more victories
