= List of aerial victories of Otto Kissenberth =

Otto Kissenberth was a German First World War fighter ace credited with 20 confirmed aerial victories. He began his career as an ace in spectacular fashion; at a time when an aerial victory was still a marvel, he shot down three enemy airplanes in a single afternoon on 12 October 1916. Transferred to a fighter squadron, Jagdstaffel 16, he shot down two opposing airplanes, as well as an observation balloon. Promoted to command of Jagdstaffel 23, he shot down 14 more opposing aircraft before being sidelined by an aviation accident.

== The victory list ==
Otto Kissenberth's victories are reported in chronological order, not the order or dates the victories were confirmed by headquarters.

No.	Date	Time	Foe	Unit	Location
1	12 October 1916	ca. 1520 hours	Farman	Escadrille F.123, Service Aéronautique	Widensolen, France
2	October 1916	ca. 1521 hours	Farman	Escadrille F.123, Service Aéronautique	Ihringen, Germany
3	October 1916	1659 hours	Bréguet 5	No. 3 Naval Wing, RNAS	Oberenzen, France
4	26 May 1917		SPAD		Somme-Py, France
5	19 June 1917		Observation balloon (Note: Because observation balloons were so important for intelligence gathering, they were protected from attack by antiaircraft guns, machine guns and fighter patrols.)	38 Compagnie, Service Aéronautique	Aubreville, France
6	16 July 1917	1235 hours	SPAD S.VII	Escadrille Spa.85, Service Aéronautique	Morte Homme
7	12 August 1917	1810 hours	SPAD S.VII		Avecourt Wood
8	17 August 1917		Nieuport 17		Morte Homme
9	19 August 1917	1735 hours	SPAD S.VII		Morte Homme
10	20 August 1917	1015 hours	SPAD S.VII		Morte Homme
11	20 August 1917	1950 hours	SPAD S.VII	Escadrille Spa.84, Service Aéronautique	Haumont, France
12	22 August 1917	1216 hours	Paul Schmitt		Hill 304, Verdun, France
13	6 September 1917	1402 hours	SPAD S.VII		Beaumont, France
14	19 September 1917	1640 hours	SPAD S.VII		Montzéville, France
15	22 September 1917	1430 hours	SPAD S.VII		Vaux, France
16	23 September 1917	0950 hours	Sopwith 1 1/2 Strutter		Hill 304, Verdun, France
Unconfirmed	23 September 1917		Caudron		Fort Marre
17	23 September 1917	0815 hours	SPAD S.VII		East of Vaqois
18	2 October 1917		Sopwith 1 1/2 Strutter		South of Avecourt
19	25 January 1918	1250 hours	SPAD		Hill 304, Verdun, France
20	16 May 1918	1055 hours	Royal Aircraft Factory SE.5a		Between Tilly and Neuville, France

Abbreviations were expanded by the editor creating this list.

== Sources ==
- Franks, Norman; Bailey, Frank; Guest, Russell (1993). Above the Lines: The Aces and Fighter Units of the German Air Service, Naval Air Service and Flanders Marine Corps, 1914–1918. London UK: Grub Street Publishing. ISBN 978-0-948817-73-1.
