= Harold Whistler =

British World War I flying ace

Harold Alfred Whistler
- Born: 30 December 1896; Theddlethorpe, Lincolnshire, England
- Died: 1 March 1940 (aged 43); Over the Gulf of Oman
- Military career
- Allegiance: United Kingdom
- Branch: British Army; Royal Air Force
- Service years: 1916–1940
- Rank: Group Captain
- Nickname: Willy
- Units: No. 3 Squadron RFC; No. 80 Squadron RAF
- Commands: No. 55 Squadron RAF
- Conflicts: World War I • Western Front; World War II
- Awards: Distinguished Service Order; Distinguished Flying Cross & 2 Bars

Group Captain Harold Alfred Whistler, DSO, DFC & Two Bars (30 December 1896 – March 1940) was an English fighter pilot and flying ace in the First World War.

== Early life ==
Alfred Harold Whistler was born in 1896 in Theddlethorpe, Lincolnshire, the son of Alfred James Whistler, a clergyman, and his wife Mary Maud. In the 1901 Census for Louth he is listed as Harold Alfred Whistler aged 4 with his parents, older brother and two older sisters living at the Rectory, Little Carlton. Whistler was educated at Oundle School near Peterborough and then at the Royal Military College, Sandhurst.

== First World War ==
Upon passing out from Sandhurst, Whistler was commissioned a second lieutenant in the Dorsetshire Regiment on 19 July 1916. He subsequently transferred to the Royal Flying Corps to be trained as a pilot, and was seconded to the RFC on 29 September with the appointment of flying officer. He was soon on operations and was wounded in action on 29 January 1917 when he was with 3 Squadron RFC. When he recovered he joined 80 Squadron RFC. He was promoted to the temporary rank of lieutenant (while serving with the RFC) on 1 August 1917, and was appointed a flight commander on 27 August, flying the Sopwith Camel. Promoted to the permanent rank of lieutenant on 19 January 1918, he returned to operations in France that year. He was credited with 23 victories (1 balloon, 13 destroyed, 9 'out of control') between March 1918 and October 1918, all while flying the Sopwith Camel.

== Post war ==
With the end of the war he stayed in the Royal Air Force as an instructor with various units. On 1 August 1919, he received a permanent commission in the new Royal Air Force in the rank of captain (subsequently regraded to flight lieutenant). He was promoted to squadron leader on 1 July 1927.

In the late 1920s he commanded 55 Squadron in operations against the Najd Bedouin tribesmen. He was promoted to wing commander on 1 July 1934 and to group captain on 1 July 1938. By 1940 he was chief of staff of RAF India as an acting air commodore. On a return trip to the United Kingdom from India on an Imperial Airways Handley Page H.P.42, it disappeared without trace over the Gulf of Oman on 1 March 1940 with eight aboard.

His name is inscribed on the Singapore Memorial at the Kranji War Cemetery.

Whistler was born Alfred Harold Whistler and his medal citations reflect that but other records list him as Harold Alfred Whistler.

== See also ==
- List of people who disappeared mysteriously at sea

== Honours and awards ==
- 3 August 1918

Lt. (temp. Capt.) Alfred Harold Whistler is awarded the Distinguished Flying Cross.

"A very courageous and enterprising patrol leader, who has rendered valuable services. He has done exceptionally good work in attacking ground targets, which he engages at very low altitudes. During the past month his patrol attacked eight enemy scouts who were flying above him. He attacked a triplane and brought it down in a crash, and whilst thus himself engaged another of his pilots destroyed a second enemy machine. The remainder of the enemy formation were then driven off."

- 2 November 1918

Capt. Alfred Harold Whistler, DFC. (Dorset Regt.) is appointed a Companion of the Distinguished Service Order.

"During recent operations this officer has rendered exceptionally brilliant service in attacking enemy aircraft and troops on the ground. On 9 August he dropped four bombs on a hostile battery, engaged and threw into confusion a body of troops, and drove down a hostile balloon, returning to his aerodrome after a patrol of one and a half hours duration with a most valuable report. He has in all destroyed ten aircraft and driven down five others out of control."

- 8 February 1919

Capt. Alfred Harold Whistler, DSO, is awarded a bar to the Distinguished Flying Cross.

"This officer has twenty-two enemy machines and one balloon to his credit. He distinguished himself greatly on 29 September, when he destroyed two machines in one combat, and on 15 September, when, following two balloons to within twenty feet of the ground, he destroyed one and caused the observer of the second to jump out and crash. He has, in addition, done arduous and valuable service in bombing enemy objectives and obtaining information. Captain Whistler is a gallant officer of fine judgment and power of leadership."

- 15 March 1929

Awarded a Second Bar to the Distinguished Flying Cross

"In recognition of gallant and distinguished services rendered in connection with the operations against the Akhwan in the Southern Desert, Iraq, during the period November 1927 – May 1928."
