= List of aerial victories of Karl Schlegel =

Karl Schlegel (1893-1918) was a German First World War fighter ace credited with confirmed aerial victories over eight enemy airplanes and 14 observation balloons while flying combat for Jagdstaffel 45. Two combat claims for his final fatal dogfight on 27 October 1918 went unconfirmed.

== The victory list ==
Karl Schlegel's victories are reported in chronological order, which is not necessarily the order or dates the victories were confirmed by headquarters.

No.	Date	Time	Foe	Unit	Location
1	14 June 1918		Observation balloon (Note: Observation balloons were crucial posts for directing artillery fire upon enemy forces. They were well defended by zeroed-in antiaircraft guns, and protected by fighter patrols. (per Guttman, pp. 7-9))		Villers-Cotterêts, France
2	4 July 1918	1845 hours	Observation balloon	French 45 Compagnie	Comblizy, France
3	6 July 1918		Observation balloon	2nd United States Balloon Company	Bezu
4	15 July 1918	1640 hours	SPAD		Comblizy, France
5	15 July 1918	1650 hours	SPAD		Comblizy, France
6	19 July 1918	0805 hours	Observation balloon	French 92 Compagnie	Creuves
7	20 July 1918		Observation balloon	French 25 Compagnie	Neuilly, France
8	22 July 1918		Bréguet 14		Gland, France
9	25 July 1918	0700 hours	Bréguet 14		Missy-aux-Bois, France
10	25 July 1918	0715 hours	Observation balloon	1st United States Balloon Company	La Croix
11	29 July 1918	1700 hours	Bréguet 14		Armentières, France
12	30 July 1918	1210 hours	Bréguet 14		Grisolles, France
13	4 August 1918	0810 hours	SPAD S.XI	1st United States Balloon Company	Braisne, France
14	6 August 1918	1250 hours	Observation balloon		Between Marcuilen and Dole, France
15	12 August 1918	1830 hours	Observation balloon		Drocy
16	12 August 1918	1840 hours	Observation balloon		Loupeigne, France
17	21 August 1918	1755 hours	Observation balloon	French 33 Compagnie	Brangex
18	21 August 1918	1835 hours	Observation balloon	French 83 Compagnie	Vic, France
19	29 August 1918	0950 hours	SPAD		Fismes, France
20	1 September 1918	1005 hours	Observation balloon	French 29 Compagnie	Œuilly, France
21	4 September 1918	French 26 Compagnie	Observation balloon		Sarcy, France
22	5 September 1918	1730 hours	Observation balloon		Fismes, France
Unconfirmed	27 October 1918	1540 hours	Observation balloon		La Malmaison, France
Unconfirmed	27 October 1918	1545 hours	SPAD S.XI		La Malmaison, France

Abbreviations were expanded by the editor creating this list.

== Sources ==
- Franks, Norman; Bailey, Frank; Guest, Russell (1993). Above the Lines: The Aces and Fighter Units of the German Air Service, Naval Air Service and Flanders Marine Corps, 1914–1918. London UK: Grub Street Publishing. ISBN 978-0-948817-73-1.
- Guttman, Jon (2005). Balloon-Busting Aces of World War 1. Oxford UK: Osprey Publishing. ISBN 978-1-84176-877-9.
