= List of aerial victories of Friedrich Friedrichs =

Friedrich Friedrichs (1895-1918) was a German First World War fighter ace credited with either 20 or 21 confirmed aerial victories as a member of fighter squadron Jagdstaffel 10. As one of the few pilots courageous enough to be a balloon buster, he destroyed 11 of the crucial artillery direction posts.

== The victory list ==
The victories of Friedrich Friedrichs are reported in chronological order, which is not necessarily the order or dates the victories were confirmed by headquarters.

No.	Date	Time	Foe	Unit	Location
Unconfirmed	18 March 1918		Sopwith Camel		Awoingt, France
1	21 March 1918	1355 hours	Observation balloon (Note: Observation balloons, which granted wide fields of view to aerial observers, were vital assets for directing artillery barrages on the enemy. As such, they were primary targets for aerial attack to destroy them, and were heavily defended by antiaircraft cannons and machine guns, as well as fighter patrols.)		Ruyalcourt
2	27 March 1918	1030 hours	Royal Aircraft Factory SE.5a	No. 40 Squadron RAF	North of Pozieres, France
3	3 May 1918	1850 hours	Airco DH.9		Fontaine-lès-Cappy, France
4	15 May 1918	0815 hours	Sopwith Camel	No. 70 Squadron RAF	Northwest of Albert, France
5	18 May 1918	0730 hours	Observation balloon	35th Section, 12th Company, 3rd Balloon Wing RAF	Ransart
6	28 May 1918	1730 hours	Observation balloon		South of Chavigny, France
7	5 June 1918	1120 hours	Observation balloon		North of Villers-Cotterêts, France
8	5 June 1918	2010 hours	Observation balloon		North of Villers-Cotterêts, France
9	6 June 1918	0725 hours	Observation balloon		South of Domans
10	8 June 1918	0710 hours	Observation balloon	73 Compagnie, Service Aéronautique	Rosnay, France
11	9 June 1918	1630 hours	Bréguet 14		West of Villers Allerend, France
12	16 June 1918	0700 hours	Observation balloon		Vendresse, France
13	23 June 1918	0945 hours	SPAD		West of Fossoy, France
14	25 June 1918	2040 hours	Observation balloon	55 Compagnie, Service Aéronautique	Rocheswald
15	27 June 1918	0900 hours	SPAD		La Ferté-Milon, France
16	27 June 1918	1300 hours	SPAD		Neuilly, France
17	28 July 1918	0830 hours	SPAD		Longpont, France
18	30 June 1918	1040 hours	Observation balloon	43 Compagnie, Service Aéronautique	Fleury, France
19	30 June 1918	1555 hours	Observation balloon	54 Compagnie, Service Aéronautique	Château-Thierry, France
20	2 July 1918	0820 hours	Nieuport 28		Etrepilly, France
Unconfirmed or 21 (Note: The Aerodrome website reports this claim as unconfirmed; Above the Lines confirms it and reports its squadron.)	8 July 1918	1230 hours	Nieuport 28	147th Aero Squadron, USAAS	South of Sarcy, France

Abbreviations were expanded by the editor creating this list.
