= List of aerial victories of Heinrich Kroll =

Heinrich Kroll (1894-1946) was a German First World War fighter ace credited with 33 confirmed aerial victories. He shot down his first five opponents while flying combat for the fighter squadron Jagdstaffel 9, beginning in November 1916. On 1 July 1917 he was transferred to command Jagdstaffel 24. By the time a severe wounding removed him from flight duty on 14 August 1918, he had scored an additional 28 victories.

== List of victories ==
Victories are reported in chronological order, which is not necessarily the dates the victories were confirmed by headquarters.

This list is complete for entries, though obviously not for all details. Background data was abstracted from Above the Lines: The Aces and Fighter Units of the German Air Service, Naval Air Service and Flanders Marine Corps, 1914–1918, ISBN 978-0-948817-73-1, pp. 150–151, and The Aerodrome webpage on Heinrich Kroll . Abbreviations were expanded by the editor creating this list.

No.	Date	Time	Foe	Unit	Location	Remarks
1	1 May 1917	1935 hours	SPAD		West of Moronvillers	
2	7 May 1917	1125 hours	SPAD		East of Auberive, France	
3	7 May 1917	1420 hours	SPAD		Saint-Hilaire-le-Grand, France	
4	20 May 1917	1850 hours	SPAD		Saint-Hilaire-le-Petit, France	
5	25 May 1917	2015 hours	SPAD S.VII	Escadrille SPA.3, Service Aéronautique	Fort de la Pompelle, France	French ace René Dorme KIA
Unconfirmed	30 May 1917				South of Moronvillers	
6	20 July 1917	2100 hours	Royal Aircraft Factory SE.5a	No. 56 Squadron RFC	North of Zandvoorde	
7	12 August 1917	0900 hours	Sopwith Triplane		North of Ypres, Belgium	
8	15 August 1917	1855 hours	Royal Aircraft Factory FE.2d	No. 20 Squadron RFC	North of Ypres, Belgium	
9	9 September 1917	1835 hours	Sopwith Triplane	No. 1 Naval Squadron, RNAS	Northwest of Bellewaarde Lake, Belgium	
10	12 September 1917	1315 hours	SPAD	No. 23 Squadron RFC	Southwest of Linselles, France	
11	20 September 1917	1104 hours	SPAD		West of Zonnebeke, Belgium	
12	25 September 1917		Sopwith Pup	No. 54 Squadron RFC	Southwest of Langemarck	
13	12 November 1917	1305 hours	Sopwith Camel	No. 65 Squadron RFC	Northeast of Armentières, France	
14	13 November 1917	1435 hours	Sopwith Camel		North of Zillebeke Lake, Belgium	
15	4 December 1917	1605 hours	Royal Aircraft Factory SE.5a		East of Cantaing, France	
16	13 January 1918	1107 hours	Royal Aircraft Factory SE.5a	No. 84 Squadron RFC	Flesquieres, France	
17	25 January 1918	1735 hours	Bristol F.2 Fighter		Northwest of Saint Quentin, France	
18	29 January 1918	1135 hours	Sopwith Camel	No. 3 Squadron RFC	Southwest of Saint Quentin, France	
19	30 January 1918	1425 hours	Bristol F.2 Fighter		Hesbécourt, France	
20	18 February 1918	1220 hours	Sopwith Camel		Between Rumigny and Vendeuil, France	
21	17 March 1918	1100 hours	Sopwith Camel	No. 80 Squadron RFC	Attily, west of Saint Quentin, France	English ace Saint Cyprian Tayler KIA
22	22 March 1918	1500 hours	Royal Aircraft Factory RE.8	No. 53 Squadron RFC	Genlis Wood	
23	1 April 1918	0815 hours	SPAD		Northwest of Noyon, France	
24	31 May 1918	1830 hours	Bréguet 14		Remy	
25	7 June 1918	0825 hours	SPAD		Foret de Laigne	
26 and 27	9 Jun 1918	1015 hours	SPAD		Between Ellincourt and Moreuil, France	
28	29 June 1918	2125 hours	Royal Aircraft Factory RE.8	No. 53 Squadron RFC	West of Villers-Bretonneux, France	
29	29 June 1918	2135 hours	Royal Aircraft Factory SE.5a		West of Villers-Bretonneux, France	
30	5 July 1918	2145 hours	SPAD		South of Cournay	
31	8 August 1918	0940 hours	Royal Aircraft Factory RE.8		West of Villers-Bretonneux, France	
32	8 August 1918	1625 hours	Royal Aircraft Factory SE.5a			
33	9 August 1918	0820 hours	Royal Aircraft Factory SE.5a		West of Le Quesnel, France	
