= List of aerial victories of Friedrich Altemeier =

Friedrich Altemeier was a German fighter ace during World War I. While flying combat with Jagdstaffel 24 (Fighter Squadron 24), he scored 21 confirmed aerial victories between 3 March 1917 and 10 November 1918. Another two combat claims went unconfirmed.

== List of victories ==
This list is complete for entries, though obviously not for all details. Information was abstracted from Above the Lines: The Aces and Fighter Units of the German Air Service, Naval Air Service and Flanders Marine Corps, 1914–1918, pp. 60–61, Norman Franks, Frank W. Bailey, Russell Guest. Grub Street, 1993. ISBN 978-0-948817-73-1 and from The Aerodrome webpage on Friedrich Altemeier Abbreviations from those sources were expanded by editor creating this list.

No.	Date/time	Victim	Squadron	Location
1	3 March 1817	Nieuport 17		Bois Morel
2	7 July 1917 @ 1105 hours	Sopwith Triplane	No. 1 (Naval) Squadron	Bousbecque, France
3	12 July 1917 @ 200 hours	Spad S.VII		Zillebeke Lake, Belgium
4	17 August 1917 @ 2010 hours	RE.8	No. 7 Squadron RFC	North of Zillebeke Lake, Belgium
5	17 August 1917 @ 2040 hours	Spad S.VII		South of Zillebeke Lake, Belgium
6	9 September 1917 @ 1840 hours	Spad S.VII		Ypres, Belgium
7	20 September 1917 @ 1104 hours	DH.5	No. 32 Squadron RFC	West of Zonnebeke, Belgium
8	25 September 1917 @ 0950 hours	Spad		Langemarck, Belgium
9	26 September 1917	Sopwith Triplane	French Naval Escadrille	Comines
10	19 February 1918 @ 1125 hours	SE.5a		Saint-Gobian Forest, France
11	24 February 1918 @1415 hours	RE.8	No. 52 Squadron RFC	Marcy, Aisne, France
12	12 March 1918 @ 1140 hours	Bristol F.2 Fighter	No. 48 Squadron RFC	Villeret, France
13	22 March 1918 1440 hours	RE.8	No. 53 Squadron RFC	Essigny le Grand
14	24 March 1918 @ 1545 hours	Sopwith Camel	No. 46 Squadron RFC	Northeast of Chauny, France
15	8 August 1918 @ 1930 hours	DH.4		Hayencourt
16	12 August 1918 @ 1810 hours	SE.5a	No. 41 Squadron RAF	Southwest of Roye, France
Unconfirmed	23 September 1918 @ 1040 hours	Bristol F.2 Fighter		
17	27 September 1918 @ 1020 hours	Bristol F.2 Fighter	No. 62 Squadron RAF	Marcy-Fontaine
18	29 September 1918 @ 1040 hours	"Scout"		Montbrehain, France
19	8 October 1918 @ 1730 hours	Bristol F.2 Fighter	No. 20 Squadron RAF	Brancourt, France
Unconfirmed	27 October 1918	Bristol F.2 Fighter	Possibly Sopwith Snipe- William George Barker WIA 201 Squadron	Forêt de Mormal.
20	28 October 1918 @ 0920 hours	RE.8		West of Happengarbes
21	10 November 1918 @ 1050 hours	RE.8		Solre, France
