= List of aerial victories of Hans Bethge =

Hans Bethge (1890-1918) was a German First World War fighter ace credited with 20 confirmed aerial victories. He scored his first three aerial victories as a member of Germany's first dedicated fighter squadron, Jagdstaffel 1. On 14 January 1917, he was posted to command of a forming squadron, Jagdstaffel 30. He would score 17 more victories while in their lead. His 20th victory, a week before his death on 17 March 1918, qualified him for Germany's highest military honor, the Pour le Merite, or Blue Max, but his death in action scotched the award.

== The victory list ==
Hans Bethge's victories are reported in chronological order, which is not necessarily the order or dates the victories were confirmed by headquarters.

No.	Date	Time	Foe	Unit	Location
1	29 August 1916	1205 hours	Royal Aircraft Factory BE.2c	No. 15 Squadron RFC	South of Auchonvillers, France
2	31 August 1916	0815 hours	Martinsyde G.100	No. 27 Squadron RFC	Fins, France
Unconfirmed	20 December 1916		Enemy airplane		
3	26 December 1916	1210 hours	Royal Aircraft Factory BE.2d		Beugny, France
4	28 March 1917	1024 hours	Nieuport Scout	No. 1 Squadron RFC	Roubaix, France
5	6 April 1917	1048 hours	Sopwith 1 1/2 Strutter	No. 45 Squadron RFC	Vicinity of Tournai, Belgium
6	25 May 1917	2055 hours	Nieuport Scout		Vicinity of Douai, France
7	1 June 1917	2130 hours	Royal Aircraft Factory FE.8	No. 41 Squadron RFC	Warneton
8	5 June 1917	1245 hours	SPAD		Frelinghen
9	15 July 1917	2110 hours	Sopwith Camel	No. 8 Naval Squadron RNAS	BetweenLoison, France and Harnes, France
10	20 July 1917	2130 hours	Sopwith Pup		Diernacourt
11	15 August 1917	2045 hours	Nieuport		West of Annay, France
12 and 13	17 August 1917	1905 hours	Two Sopwith Camels collided	No. 8 Naval Squadron RNAS	Wingles, France
14	21 August 1917	0805 hours	Martinsyde G.100		Seclin, France
15	4 September 1917	1945 hours	Bristol F.2 Fighter		La Bassée, France
16	4 September 1917	1950 hours	Bristol F.2 Fighter		La Bassée, France
17	18 September 1917	1035 hours	Airco DH.5	No. 41 Squadron RFC	Viz-en-Artois
18	31 October 1917	1310 hours	Royal Aircraft Factory RE.8		Blouvain
19	19 February 1918	1405 hours	Sopwith Camel	No. 80 Squadron RFC	North of Lorgies, France
20	10 March 1918	1210 hours	Airco DH.4	No. 18 Squadron RFC	Allennes, France

Abbreviations were expanded by the editor creating this list.

== Sources ==
- Franks, Norman; Bailey, Frank; Guest, Russell (1993). Above the Lines: The Aces and Fighter Units of the German Air Service, Naval Air Service and Flanders Marine Corps, 1914–1918. London UK: Grub Street Publishing. ISBN 978-0-948817-73-1.
