= List of aerial victories of Otto Könnecke =

List of aerial victories of Otto Könnecke

Vizefeldwebel, and later Leutnant, Otto Könnecke (1892-1956) was a German First World War fighter ace credited with 35 confirmed and two unconfirmed aerial victories. After service on the Italian Front with Jagdstaffel 25, he transferred to Jagdstaffel 5 in France to score 33 more victories. His victories, added to those of his two sergeant pilot friends Josef Mai and Fritz Rumey, totaled over 100, and comprised about half the squadron's victory roll. They were dubbed The Golden Triumvirate.

Otto Könnecke's victories are reported in chronological order, which is not necessarily the order or dates the victories were confirmed by headquarters.

This list is complete for entries, though obviously not for all details. Background data was abstracted from Above the Lines: The Aces and Fighter Units of the German Air Service, Naval Air Service and Flanders Marine Corps, 1914–1918, ISBN 978-0-948817-73-1, p. 148; and The Aerodrome webpage on Otto Könnecke . Abbreviations were expanded by the editor creating this list.

No.	Date	Time	Foe	Unit	Location
Unconfirmed	9 January 1917		Enemy airplane		
1	5 February 1917		Farman	Serbian Air Park No. 30	Northwest of Moglia, Italy
2	6 February 1917		Farman	Serbian Escadrille Flik 98	Monastir
3	28 May 1917	1350 hours	Royal Aircraft Factory FE.2b	No. 25 Squadron RFC	Beaumont, France
4	4 June 1917	0720 hours	Royal Aircraft Factory FE.2b	No. 22 Squadron RFC	South of Vendhuile, France
5	10 August 1917	0740 hours	Airco DH.5	No. 59 Squadron RFC	Malassise Ferme
6	18 August 1917	1050 hours	Airco DH.5		Ribecourt, France
7	21 August 1917	1605 hours	Royal Aircraft Factory RE.8	No. 24 Squadron RFC	Northwest of Vaucelles Wood, France
8	17 October 1917		Two-seater		Origny, France
9	22 November 1917	0840 hours	Sopwith Camel	No. 59 Squadron RFC	Anneux, France
10	23 November 1917	1320 hours	Airco DH.5		Fontaine
11	5 December 1917		Sopwith Camel	No. 3 Squadron RFC	Seranvillers, France
12	28 January 1918	1450 hours	Royal Aircraft Factory SE.5a		Tilloy, France
Unconfirmed	3 February 1918	1230 hours	Airco DH.4		Villers-Guislain, France
13	17 March 1918	1320 hours	Royal Aircraft Factory RE.8		Graincourt, France
14	23 March 1918	1125 hours	Royal Aircraft Factory RE.8		Hervilly, France
15	24 March 1918		Royal Aircraft Factory RE.8		
16	1 April 1918	1245 hours	Royal Aircraft Factory SE.5a	No. 56 Squadron RAF	Albert
17	11 April 1918	1715 hours	Royal Aircraft Factory SE.5a		Bapaume, France
18	12 April 1918	1850 hours	Royal Aircraft Factory SE.5a	No. 84 Squadron RAF	North of Albert, France
19	19 May 1918		Airco DH.9	No. 49 Squadron RAF	Villers-Bretonneux, France
20	30 May 1918		Airco DH.9		Demancourt
21	30 May 1918		Sopwith Camel		Ribécourt
22	9 July 1918		Bristol F.2 Fighter	No. 48 Squadron RAF	Northeast of Albert
23	19 July 1918	1755 hours	Sopwith Camel		Northeast of Etinehem
24	8 August 1918	0905 hours	Bristol F.2 Fighter		Mericourt, France
25	8 August 1918	1145 hours	Royal Aircraft Factory SE.5a		West of Mericourt, France
26	8 August 1918	1845 hours	Royal Aircraft Factory SE.5a		Northwest of Roman Camp
27	9 August 1918		Royal Aircraft Factory SE.5a		
28	9 August 1918	1620 hours	Bristol F.2 Fighter		
29	9 August 1918		Royal Aircraft Factory SE.5a		
30	12 August 1918		"Scout"		
31	14 August 1918		Bristol F.2 Fighter		
32	24 August 1918	1920 hours	Royal Aircraft Factory SE.5a	No. 56 Squadron RAF	Northeast of Bapaume
33	18 October 1918	1745 hours	Royal Aircraft Factory SE.5a		Southeast of Le Cateau, France
34	1 November 1918		Airco DH.4	No. 25 Squadron RAF	
35	4 November 1918	1145 hours	Airco DH.4		Mormal Wood, France
