= List of aerial victories of Franz Büchner =

Franz Büchner was a German First World War fighter ace credited with 40 confirmed aerial victories. After scoring his initial aerial victory while flying with Jagdstaffel 9 of the Luftstreitkräfte, he transferred to Jagdstaffel 13 to score the remainder of his victories.

== The victory list ==
This list is complete for entries, though obviously not for all details. Double break in list marks transition between jagdstaffeln. Information was abstracted from Above the Lines: The Aces and Fighter Units of the German Air Service, Naval Air Service and Flanders Marine Corps, 1914–1918, ISBN 0-948817-73-9, ISBN 978-0-948817-73-1, pp. 86–87, and from The Aerodrome webpage on Franz Büchner . Abbreviations from those sources were expanded by editor creating this list.

No.	Date/time	Victim	Squadron	Location	Remarks
1	17 August 1917 @ 1230 hours	Nieuport		Southeast of Chappy	
2	15 October 1917	SPAD		Margivil	
3	10 June 1918	SPAD		South of Vauxallion	
4	11 June 1918	SPAD			
5	28 June 1918 @ 2100 hours	Royal Aircraft Factory SE.5a	No. 56 Squadron RAF		
6	1 July 1918	Sopwith			
7	2 July 1918 @ 1045 hours	Sopwith Dolphin	No. 87 Squadron RAF	Contay, France	Ace Joseph Cruess Callaghan KIA
8	7 July 1918 @ 1115 hours	Sopwith Camel	No. 209 Squadron RAF	Near Hamel, France	Ace Merrill Samuel Taylor KIA
9 and 10	16 July 1918	Two Breguet 14s			
11	19 July 1918	SPAD			
12	29 July 1918 @ 1840 hours	Sopwith Camel	No. 73 Squadron RAF	Venizel, France	
13	9 August 1918 @ 1820 hours	SPAD two-seater		Lignieres	
14	10 August 1918 @ 1125 hours	Bristol F.2 Fighter			
15	11 August 1918 @ 1908 hours	Sopwith		Roye, France	
16	11 August 1918 @ 1910 hours	SPAD		Estrees, France	
17	14 August 1918 @ 1840 hours	Sopwith Camel	No. 46 Squadron RAF	Chaulnes, France	
18	19 August 1918 @ 1006 hours	Breguet or Airco DH.9		Pertain, France	
19	20 August 1918	SPAD			
20	20 August 1918	Breguet 14			
21	12 September 1918	Airco DH.4	8th Aero Squadron, USAAS	North of Hattonville	
22	12 September 1918	Airco DH.4		Vieville-en-Haye, France	
23	12 September 1918	Breguet 14		East of Thiaucourt, France	
24	13 September 1918	SPAD		Allamont, France	
Unconfirmed	13 September 1918	SPAD		Allamont, France	
25	14 September 1918	Two-seater reconnaissance aircraft		Mars-la-Tour, France	
26	14 September 1918	Breguet 14		Latour, France	
27	15 September 1918	SPAD 13		Thiaucourt, France	
28	15 September 1918	SPAD 13		Lachaussee, France	
29	17 September 1918	Salmson 2A2		Dampvitoux, France	
30	18 September 1918	SPAD		Dampvitoux, France	
31	18 September 1918 @ 1725 hours	SPAD		Chambley-Bussières, France	
32	18 September 1918 @ 1730 hour	SPAD		West of Chambley-Bussières, France	
33	26 September 1918	SPAD 13	27th Aero Squadron, USAAS	Consenvoye, France	
34	26 September 1918	SPAD 13	94th Aero Squadron, USAAS	Charpentrie	
35	26 September 1918	SPAD 13	94th Aero Squadron, USAAS	Gercourt-et-Drillancourt, France	
36	26 September 1918	SPAD 13	22nd Aero Squadron, USAAS	Étreillers, France	
37	28 September 1918	Salmson 2A2	88th Aero Squadron, USAAS	Nantillois, France	
38	1 October 1918	Salmson 2A2			
39	21 October 1918	Enemy aircraft		Argonne, France	
40	22 October 1918	Two-seater reconnaissance aircraft			
