= List of aerial victories of Friedrich Ritter von Röth =

Friedrich Ritter von Röth (1894–1918) was a German First World War fighter ace credited with 28 confirmed aerial victories, 20 of which were observation balloons. The observation balloons were extremely hazardous to attack; they were fleeting targets hooked to motors to draw them rapidly earthward to safety when threatened. They were also ringed with pre-sighted antiaircraft guns, and their vicinity was patrolled by fighter units. Röth was notable as the premier balloon buster of the Imperial German Air Service. Notably, he eschewed single victories over the gasbags, once downing a pair, three times destroying a trio, once a quartet—and on 29 May 1918, he torched five observation balloons within 15 minutes. Overall, Röth made his first ten victories with Jagdstaffel 23 before transferring to Jagdstaffel 16 for his remaining 18 victories.

== The victory list ==
Friedrich Ritter von Röth's victories are reported in chronological order, which is not necessarily the order or dates the victories were confirmed by headquarters.

No.	Date	Time	Foe	Unit	Location
1	25 January 1918	1257 hours	Observation balloon	French 55th Compagnie	Recicourt, France
2	25 January 1918	1301 hours	Observation balloon	French 59th Compagnie	Betheleville
3	25 January 1918	1305 hours	Observation balloon	French 80th Compagnie	Framereville
4	28 February 1918	1250 hours	Royal Aircraft Factory RE.8	No. 16 Squadron RFC	Mericourt, France
5	21 March 1918	1130 hours	Observation balloon	British 44th Section, 19th Company, 1st Balloon Wing	Marcoing, France
6	21 March 1918		Observation balloon	British 1st Section, 18th Company, 3rd Balloon Wing	Beugny, France
7	1 April 1918	1730 hours	Observation balloon	British 10th Section, 2nd Company, 1st Balloon Wing	Cambrin, France
8	1 April 1918	1735 hours	Observation balloon	British 8th Section, 1st Company, 1st Balloon Wing	Hulluch, France
9	1 April 1918	1737 hours	Observation balloon	British 20th Section, 1st Company, 1st Balloon Wing	Loos, France
10	1 April 1918	1740 hours	Observation balloon	British 24th Section, 2nd Company, 1st Balloon Wing	South of Loos, France
11	29 May 1918	1600 hours	Observation balloon	1st Belgian	Between Poperinge (Poperinghe) and Diksmuide, Belgium
12	29 May 1918	1604 hours	Observation balloon		Between Diksmuide and Poperinge, Belgium
13	29 May 1918	1609 hours	Observation balloon	British 25th Section, 5th Company, 2nd Balloon Wing	Between Diksmuide and Poperinge, Belgium
14	29 May 1918	1612 hours	Observation balloon	British 39th Section, 8th Company, 2nd Balloon Wing	Between Poperinge, Belgium and Hazebrouck, France
15	29 May 1918	1615 hours	Observation balloon		Between Poperinge, Belgium and Hazebrouck, France
16	25 July 1918	0950 hours	Bristol F.2 Fighter	No. 20 Squadron RAF	Gheluvelt, Belgium
17	29 July 1918	2035 hours	Airco DH.9	No. 206 Squadron RAF	Gheluvelt, Belgium
18	30 July 1918	2100 hours	Bristol F.2 Fighter	No. 20 Squadron RAF	South of Ypres, Belgium
19	12 August 1918	0840 hours	Royal Aircraft Factory SE.5a	No. 85 Squadron RAF	Langemarck (Langemark), Belgium
20	13 August 1918	1920 hours	Observation balloon	6th Belgian	Lampernisse, Belgium
21	13 August 1918	1922 hours	Observation balloon	2nd Belgian	Lampernisse, Belgium
22	13 August 1918	1925 hours	Observation balloon	3rd Belgian	Lampernisse, Belgium
23	4 September 1918	0930 hours	Airco DH.9	No. 107 Squadron RAF	Neuf-Berquin, France
24	8 October 1918		Royal Aircraft Factory RE.8	No. 7 Squadron RAF	Gheluvelt, Belgium
25	10 October 1918	1730 hours	Observation balloon	British 38th Section, 7th Company, 2nd Balloon Wing	Between Ypres and Staden, Belgium
26	10 October 1918	1731 hours	Observation balloon	French 25th Compagnie	Between Ypres and Staden, Belgium
27	10 October 1918	1733 hours	Observation balloon	French 25th Compagnie	Between Ypres and Staden, Belgium
28	14 October 1918		Airco DH.9	No. 108 Squadron RAF	Ledegem, Belgium

This list is complete for entries, though obviously not for all details. Background data was abstracted from Above the Lines: The Aces and Fighter Units of the German Air Service, Naval Air Service and Flanders Marine Corps, 1914–1918, ISBN 978-0-948817-73-1, pp. 192–193; and The Aerodrome webpage on Friedrich Ritter von Röth . Added facts are individually cited. Abbreviations were expanded by the editor creating this list.
