= List of aerial victories of Walter von Bülow-Bothkamp =

Walter von Bülow-Bothkamp (1894-1918) was a German First World War fighter ace credited with 28 confirmed aerial victories. He began his aerial victory career in 1915, shooting down a couple of enemy airplanes in October. Transferred from France to the Middle East, he scored a couple of victories in Egypt during 1916. Shifted back to France in December, Bülow-Bothkamp joined a fighter squadron, Jagdstaffel 18. He shot down eight more enemy airplanes and an observation balloon by mid-1917. He then went to another fighter squadron, Jagdstaffel 36, to destroy two more observation balloons and 13 more enemy airplanes before being killed in action on 6 January 1918.

== The victory list ==
Walter von Bülow-Bothkamp's victories are reported in chronological order, which is not necessarily the order or dates the victories were confirmed by headquarters.

No.	Date	Time	Foe	Unit	Location	Remarks
1	11 October 1915		Voisin		Metz, France	
2	11 October 1915		Farman			
3	8 August 1916		Enemy airplane		El Arish, Egypt	
4	17 September 1916		Sopwith Baby	HMS Ben-my-Chree	East of Al Arish, Egypt	
Unconfirmed	17 September 1916		Sopwith Baby		East of El Arish, Egypt	Damaged; forced to land on sea
5	23 January 1917		Sopwith 1½ Strutter	No. 45 Squadron, RFC	Gheluvelt, Belgium	
6	23 January 1917	p.m.	Royal Aircraft Factory FE.8	No. 41 Squadron RFC	Bixschoote, Belgium	
7	26 January 1917		Sopwith 1½ Strutter	No. 45 Squadron RFC	Recham	
8	7 February 1917	1325 hours	Sopwith 1½ Strutter	No. 45 Squadron RFC	Linselles, France	
9	11 March 1917	1430 hours	Observation balloon	9th Kite Balloon Section	North of Armentières, France	
10	7 April 1917	1815 hours	Royal Aircraft Factory FE.2d	No. 20 Squadron RFC	South of Ploegsteert, Belgium	
11	8 April 1917	p.m.	Nieuport 12	No. 46 Squadron RFC	East of Ypres, Belgium	
12	24 April 1917	0940 hours	Royal Aircraft Factory FE.2d	No. 20 Squadron RFC	Ypres, Belgium	
13	7 May 1917	1200 hours	Royal Aircraft Factory FE.2d		Menen, Belgium	Downed on Jagdstaffel 18's home airfield
14 and 15	21 May 1917		Two observation balloons		Bouvancourt, France	French balloons
16	6 July 1917		SPAD S.VII	No. 23 Squadron RFC	Saint Julien	
17	7 July 1917	1940 hours	Royal Aircraft Factory FE.2d	No. 20 Squadron RFC	Hooge, Belgium	
18	3 September 1917	0830 hours	Sopwith Camel		Tenbreilen	
19	13 September 1917	0810 hours	Sopwith Camel	No. 10 Naval Squadron, RNAS	Vicinity of Becelaere, France	10 Naval Squadron later became No. 210 Squadron RAF
20	23 September 1917		Nieuport 23		Warneton	
21	26 September 1917	a.m.	Royal Aircraft Factory RE.8	No. 21 Squadron RFC	Polygon Wood, Belgium	
22	18 October 1917	1045 hours	SPAD S.VII	Escadrille SPA.73, Service Aéronautique	East of Passchendaele, Belgium	
23	24 October 1917	0950 hours	SPAD	No. 19 Squadron RFC	Near Arras, France	
24	24 October 1917	1005 hours	SPAD	No. 19 Squadron RFC	Linselles, France	
25	8 November 1917	0950 hours	SPAD	No. 19 Squadron RFC	Houthem	
26	23 November 1917	1630 hours	Sopwith Camel	No. 65 Squadron RFC	West of Moorslede, Belgium	
27	29 November 1917	1635 hours	SPAD S.VII	No. 19 Squadron RFC	Passchendaele, Belgium	
28	2 December 1917	1135 hours	Bristol F.2 Fighter	No. 20 Squadron RFC	Becelaere, Belgium	Ace Harry G. E. Luchford KIA; J. E. Johnston POW

This list is complete for entries, though obviously not for all details. Background data was abstracted from Above the Lines: The Aces and Fighter Units of the German Air Service, Naval Air Service and Flanders Marine Corps, 1914–1918, ISBN 978-0-948817-73-1, p. 74; and The Aerodrome webpage on Walter von Bülow-Bothkamp . Added facts are individually cited. Abbreviations were expanded by the editor creating this list.
