= List of aerial victories of Paul Bäumer =

Paul Bäumer was a German First World War fighter ace credited with 43 aerial victories. He won his first three aerial victories while flying for Jagdstaffel 5. He then transferred to Jagdstaffel 2, where he scored the remaining 40 victories of his combat career. Three of Bäumer's victims were opposing aces: Ronald Sykes, his fifth victory, and Lynn Campbell and William Hodgkinson, his 43rd.

== List of victories ==
This list is complete for entries, though obviously not for all details. Change of jagdstaffeln is indicated by doubled lines in chart. Information was abstracted from Above the Lines: The Aces and Fighter Units of the German Air Service, Naval Air Service and Flanders Marine Corps, 1914–1918, p. 67, Norman Franks, Frank W. Bailey, Russell Guest. Grub Street, 1993. ISBN 978-0-948817-73-1 and from The Aerodrome webpage on Paul Bäumer Abbreviations from those sources were expanded by editor creating this list.

No.	Date/time	Victim	Squadron	Location
1	12 July 1917 @ 1010 hours	Observation balloon		Nurlu, Somme, France
2	13 July 1917 @ 1700 hours	Observation balloon	41st Company	Saint-Quentin, France
3	15 July 1917 @ 1840 hours	Observation balloon	45th Company	Saint-Quentin, France
4	9 September 1917 @ 1525 hours	Royal Aircraft Factory R.E.8	No. 52 Squadron RFC	Mannessvere
5	20 September 1917 @ 1510 hours	Sopwith Camel	No. 9 (Naval) Squadron	Ramskapelle, Belgium
6	21 September 1917 @ 1750 hours	Sopwith Camel		Boesinghen
7	5 November 1917 @ 1250 hours	Sopwith Camel		Saint-Julien
8	6 November 1917 @ 0825 hours	Sopwith Camel	No. 65 Squadron RFC	Vierlavenhoek, Belgium
9	6 November 1917 @ 1150 hours	SPAD VII	No. 19 Squadron RFC	East of Zonnebeke, Belgium
10	7 November 1917 @ 0810 hours	Royal Aircraft Factory R.E.8	No. 4 Squadron RFC	Morslede, Belgium
11	8 November 1917 @ 1645 hours	SE.5a	No. 84 Squadron RFC	Zillebeke, Belgium
12	8 November 1917 @ 1650 hours	SE.5a	No. 60 Squadron RFC	Zonnebeke, Belgium
13	18 November 1917 @ 0920 hours	Royal Aircraft Factory R.E.8		Northeast of Zillebeke Lake, Belgium
14	19 November 1917 @ 1600 hours	Royal Aircraft Factory R.E.8		Diksmuide, Belgium
15	28 November 1917 @ 1400 hours	Royal Aircraft Factory R.E.8	No. 7 Squadron RFC	North of Gheluvelt, Belgium
16	7 December 1917 @ 1155 hours	SPAD	No. 23 Squadron RFC	Zonnebeke, Belgium
17	16 December 1917 @ 1410 hours	Royal Aircraft Factory R.E.8		North of Boesinghen
18	18 December 1917 @ 1600 hours	Sopwith Camel		West of Becelaere, Belgium
19	9 March 1918 @ 1110 hours	Sopwith Camel		North of Zonnebeke, Belgium
20	23 March 1918 @ 1330 hours	Sopwith Camel	No. 46 Squadron RFC	South of Saint-Leger
21	23 March 1918 @ 1545 hours	Royal Aircraft Factory R.E.8		North of Tilloy
22	23 March 1918 @ 1615 hours	Royal Aircraft Factory R.E.8		South of Douai, France
23	5 September 1918 @ 1840 hours	DH.4	No. 57 Squadron RAF	South of Douai, France
24	6 September 1918	Bristol F.2 Fighter	No. 11 Squadron RAF	West of Cantaing-sur-Escaut, France
25	14 September 1918	Royal Aircraft Factory R.E.8		Cantaing-sur-Escaut, France
26	16 September 1918	Bristol F.2 Fighter or DH.4		Northeast of Henin-Lietard
27	20 September 1918 @ 1550 hours	Sopwith Camel	148th Aero Squadron, USAAS	East of Rumancourt
28	21 September 1918	DH.9	No. 205 Squadron RAF	East of Bourlon Wood, France
29	21 September 1918	DH.9		East of Lagnicourt-Marcel, France
30	21 September 1918	DH.9		East of Morchies, France
31	24 September 1918	Sopwith Camel		Sailly, France
32	24 September 1918	DH.9		Southwest of Clary, Nord, France
33	27 September 1918	Sopwith Snipe		South of Cisy
34	27 September 1918	DH.4	No. 25 Squadron RAF	West of Cambrai, France
35	27 September 1918	SE.5a		West of Cambrai, France
36	29 September 1918	Bristol F.2 Fighter	No. 11 Squadron RFC	Marcoing, France
37	29 September 1918	SE.5a		Bourlon Wood, France
38	29 September 1918	Sopwith Camel		South of Sailly, France
39	3 October 1918 @ 1430 hours	SE.5a		Rumilly, France
40	4 October 1918	SE.5a	No. 85 Squadron RAF	Montbrehain, France
41	4 October 1918	Bristol F.2 Fighter	No. 11 Squadron RAF	Cambrai Station, France
42	8 October 1918	Sopwith Camel		Bautigny
43	9 October 1918	Bristol F.2 Fighter	No. 62 Squadron RAF	Presau
