= List of aerial victories of Eduard Ritter von Dostler =

Eduard Ritter von Dostler (1892–1917) was a German First World War fighter ace credited with 26 confirmed aerial victories. In addition to his prowess as an ace, he was entrusted with the successive command of three of the German Empire's fighter squadrons.

== The victory list ==
The victories of Eduard Ritter von Dostler are reported in chronological order, which is not necessarily the order or dates the victories were confirmed by headquarters.

No.	Date	Time	Foe	Unit	Location	Remarks
1	17 December 1916		Nieuport Scout		Verdun, France	Scored while flying a Roland C.II for Schutzstaffel 27
2	22 January 1917		Caudron		Nixeville, France	Scored while assigned to fly bombers for Kampfstaffel 36.
3	24 March 1917	1230 hours	Caudron G.4	Escadrille C.18, Service Aéronautique	Rupt-en-Woëvre, France	Scored while assigned to fly bombers for Kampfstaffel 36.
4	24 March 1917	1231 hours	Caudron G.4	Escadrille C.18, Service Aéronautique	North of Ancremont	First of his string of 23 victories scored for Jagdstaffel 6
Unconfirmed	13 April 1917	1830 hours	Observation balloon		Genicourt, France	Artillery direction post
5	14 April 1917		Nieuport Scout	Escadrille N.315, Service Aéronautique	Southwest of Saint-Mihiel, France	
6	24 April 1917		Caudron		Foret d'Aublanville	
7	24 May 1917		Nieuport		Dieulouard, France	
8	3 June 1917		SPAD		Southwest of Belrupt, France	
9	16 June 1917	1850 hours	Royal Aircraft Factory FE.2b	No. 20 Squadron RFC	Ypres, Belgium	
10	16 June 1917	1905 hours	Sopwith 1½ Strutter	No. 45 Squadron RFC	't Korentje between Houthem and Comines (Komen)	
11	17 June 1917	2120 hours	Royal Aircraft Factory FE.2d	No. 20 Squadron RFC	St. Eloi	
12	20 June 1917	1800 hours	Observation balloon	4th Section, 6th Company, 2nd Balloon Wing	Bailleul, France; West of Nieppe, France	British artillery direction post
13	5 July 1917	1820 hours	Observation balloon	4th Section, 13th Company, 5th Balloon Wing	North of Ypres, Belgium	British artillery direction post
14	7 July 1917	1200 hours	Airco DH.4	No. 55 Squadron RFC	Southwest of Warneton, France	
15	12 July 1917	1150 hours	Nieuport Scout	No. 29 Squadron RFC	Houthem	
16	12 July 1917	2145 hours	Sopwith		Zillebeke, Belgium	
17	13 July 1917	1135 hours	Sopwith 1½ Strutter	No. 70 Squadron RFC	South of Beselare (Becelaere), Belgium	
18	13 July 1917	1140 hours	Nieuport 23	No. 29 Squadron RFC]	North of Zonnebeke, Belgium	
19	28 July 1917	1850 hours	Airco DH.4	No. 57 Squadron RFC	Northeast of Kortrijk, Belgium	One of six victories scored in an attack led by Dostler.
20	28 July 1917	1900 hours	Airco DH.4	No. 57 Squadron RFC	Oostrozebeke, Belgium	Another of the six victories in the Jagdstaffel 6 dogfight.
21	31 July 1917	1405 hours	Nieuport		West of Bellewaarde Vijver, Ypres	
22	9 August 1917	1855 hours	Nieuport 23	No. 29 Squadron RFC	Poelkapelle (Poelcapelle), Belgium	
23	12 August 1917	1555 hours	SPAD	No. 19 Squadron RFC	West of Gheluve	
24	14 August 1917	1930 hours	Royal Aircraft Factory SE.5	No. 56 Squadron RFC	Northeast of Saint-Julien	
25	17 August 1917	0810 hours	Airco DH.4	No. 57 Squadron RFC	North of Menen, Belgium	
26	18 August 1917	2015 hours	Airco DH.4		East of Roeselare (Roulers), Belgium	

Abbreviations were expanded by the editor creating this list.
