= List of aerial victories of Julius Buckler =

Julius Buckler PlM (1894-1960) was a German fighter ace during World War I. He was credited with 36 confirmed aerial victories flying with Jagdstaffel 17. As one of the few pilots daring enough to undertake the highly hazardous assaults on opposing observation balloons, he counted seven of them among his three dozen victories.

== List of victories ==
As the primary arena for aerial combat on the Western Front was over the German trenches and rear works, German aerial and ground observers could usually verify German victories in considerable detail. Aviation historians cited have further researched the war's victory claims, using archives from all sides.

Confirmed victories in this list are numbered and listed chronologically.

This list is complete for entries, though obviously not for all details. Abbreviations from sources utilized were expanded by editor creating this list. Sources: Norman Franks, Frank Bailey, Russell Guest (1993). Above the Lines: The Aces and Fighter Units of the German Air Service, Naval Air Service and Flanders Marine Corps, 1914–1918. Grub Street Publishing, London. ISBN 0-948817-73-9, ISBN 978-0-948817-73-1, pp. 87–88; as well as The Aerodrome's webpage on Buckler

No.	Date	Time	Foe	Squadron	Location	Notes
1	17 December 1916	1620 hours	Caudron		Bras	
2	14 February 1917		Caudron		West of Facq Wood	
3	15 February 1917		Caudron		Pont-a-Mousson, France	
4	15 April 1917		SPAD		Prouvais, France	
5	16 April 1917		Nieuport		Berry-au-Bac, France	
6	26 April 1917	0920 hours	Observation balloon	36 Compagnie, Service Aéronautique	Bois de Génicourt, France	French observation balloon
Unconfirmed	6 May 1917		SPAD		Pont-a-Vert	
7	12 May 1917	1840 hours	Nieuport		La Malmaison, France	
8	11 July 1917	0850 hours	Sopwith Triplane		Southeast of Zillebeke, Belgium	
9	13 July 1917	1320 hours	Royal Aircraft Factory FE.2d		Stuivenskerke, Belgium	
10	14 July 1917	1750 hours	Royal Aircraft Factory BE.2		Leffinghe	
11	14 July 1917	0730 hours	Sopwith Pup	No. 54 Squadron RFC	Keyem	
12	9 August 1917	0745 hours	Sopwith Camel	No. 9 Naval Squadron, Royal Naval Air Service	Southeast of Nieuwpoort, Belgium	
13	11 August 1917	1415 hours	Royal Aircraft Factory RE.8	No. 52 Squadron RFC	West of Spermalie	
14	29 September 1917	1805 hours	Airco DH.5	No. 41 Squadron RFC	Fleubair	
15	30 September 1917	1155 hours	Sopwith		Between Lens and Arras, France	
16	11 October 1917	0945 hours	Royal Aircraft Factory RE.8	No. 5 Squadron RFC	Rodincourt	
17	11 October 1917	1740 hours	Sopwith Camel	No. 28 Squadron RFC	Armentières, France	
18	17 October 1917	1120 hours	Bristol F.2 Fighter	No. 11 Squadron RFC	Rocourt	
19	24 October 1917	1620 hours	Royal Aircraft Factory RE.8	No. 16 Squadron RFC	Mericourt, France	
20	28 October 1917	1705 hours	Royal Aircraft Factory RE.8	No. 16 Squadron RFC	Mont-Saint-Éloi, France	
21	29 October 1917	0914 hours	Observation balloon	20th Section, First Company, 1st Balloon Wing	Neuville, France	British observation balloon
22	29 October 1917	1210 hours	Nieuport	No. 1 Squadron RFC	East of Houthem	
23	31 October 1917	1130 hours	Armstrong Whitworth F.K.8	No. 10 Squadron RFC	La Bassée, France	
24	31 October 1917	1620 hours	Observation balloon	42nd Section, 4th Company, 1st Balloon Wing	Laventie, France	British observation balloon
25	12 November 1917	1545 hours	Royal Aircraft Factory RE.8		Oostkerke, Belgium	
26	15 November 1917	0845 hours	Royal Aircraft Factory RE.8	No. 21 Squadron RFC	Ypres, Belgium	
27	18 November 1917	0910 hours	Observation balloon	36th Section, 17th Company, 2nd Balloon Wing	Ypres, Belgium	British observation balloon
28	18 November 1917	0925 hours	Observation balloon		Dickebusch, Belgium	Unknown nationality
29	18 November 1917	1415 hours	Royal Aircraft Factory R.E.8		Bixschoote, Belgium	
30	29 November 1917	1205 hours	Observation balloon		Bapaume, France	Unknown nationality
31	16 April 1918	1635 hours	Bréguet 14		Vaux, France	
32	21 April 1918	1230 hours	Bréguet 14		Mareuil, France	
33	3 May 1918	2100 hours	Observation balloon		Tricot, Oise, France	Unknown nationality
34	5 October 1918	1715 hours	Salmson 2A2			
35	24 October 1918		Bréguet 14		Mery	
36	30 October 1918		Enemy airplane			
Unconfirmed	8 November 1918		Royal Aircraft Factory R.E.8			
