= List of aerial victories of Friedrich Noltenius =

Friedrick Noltenius was a German fighter ace of World War I. He shot down eight enemy aircraft and four observation balloons in six weeks fighting for Jagdstaffel 27. During a transfer to Jagdstaffel 6, he shot down an enemy airplane and an observation balloon four days apart. Posted to Jagdstaffel 11, he won six more aerial combats. By war's end, Friedrich Noltenius was credited with 21 confirmed aerial victories, as well as six uncredited ones.

== List of victories ==
This list is complete for entries, though obviously not for all details. Double break in list marks transition between jagdstaffeln. Information was abstracted from: Above the Lines: The Aces and Fighter Units of the German Air Service, Naval Air Service and Flanders Marine Corps, 1914–1918, Norman Franks, Frank W. Bailey, Russell Guest Grub Street, 1993, ISBN 978-0-948817-73-1; Aces of Jagdgeschwader III, Greg VanWyngarden, Osprey Publishing, 2016, ISBN 978-1-4728-0843-1. Abbreviations from those sources were expanded for reader comprehension by editor creating this list.

No.	Date/time	Victim	Squadron	Location
unconfirmed	18 July 1918	Breguet 14		West of Saint-Crespin, France
unconfirmed	9 August 1918 @ 0810 hours	Airco DH.9		Herleville, France
1	10 August 1918 @ 1040 hours	Sopwith Dolphin	No. 87 Squadron RAF	Puzeaux, France
2	20 August 1918 @ 1255 hours	Observation balloon	71st Company	North of Forest of Retz, France
unconfirmed	27 August 1918 @ 0840 hours	Royal Aircraft Factory S.E.5a	No. 40 Squadron RAF	Herleville, France
3	30 August 1918 @ 1750 hours	Airco DH.4	No. 57 Squadron RAF	South of Etaing, France
4	31 August 1918 @ 1505 hours	Royal Aircraft Factory S.E.5a	No. 64 Squadron RAF	Rœux, France
5	2 September 1918 @ 1100 hours	Sopwith Camel		Etaing, France
6	2 September 1918 @ 1130 hours	Sopwith Camel		Rumaucourt, France
unconfirmed	3 September 1918 after 1100 hours	Royal Aircraft Factory RE.8		Beugnatre-Beugny, France
unconfirmed	4 September 1918	Sopwith Camel		Recourt, France
7	14 September 1918 @ 1740 hours	Observation balloon		Vis-en-Artois, France
8	16 September 1918	Bristol F.2 Fighter or Airco DH.4		
9	17 September 1918 @ 1530 hours	Observation balloon		
10	18 September 1918 @ 1510 hours	Observation balloon		
11	20 September 1918 @ 0745 hours	Sopwith Camel		Marcoing, France
12	20 September 1918 @ 1445 hours	Sopwith Camel		Aubigny-au-Buc
Unconfirmed	21 September 1918 @ 1830 hours	Sopwith Camel		Gavrelle, France
13	25 September 1918	Sopwith Camel		Cambrai, France
14	6 October 1918 @ 1115 hours	Observation balloon	10th U.S. Balloon Company	Bois de Puvenelle
15	10 October 1918 @ 1505 hours	SPAD		Fontaine, France
16	23 October 1918 @ 1245 hours	Observation balloon	5th U.S. Balloon Company	Chatel-Chéhéry, France
17	23 October 1918 @ 1605 hours	SPAD	Escadrille Spa.159, Service Aéronautique	
18	23 October 1918 @ 1735 hours	Observation balloon	2nd U.S. Balloon Company	Baulny, France
19	28 October 1918 @ 1700 hours	Observation balloon	8th U.S. Balloon Company	Eglisfontaine
20	3 November 1918 @ 1515 hours	Airco DH.4		Barricourt, France
21	4 November 1918 @ 1650 hours	Airco DH.4	11th Aero Squadron, United States Army Air Service	Carignan, Ardennes, France
