= List of aerial victories of Rudolf von Eschwege =

Rudolf von Eschwege (1895–1917) was a German flying ace during World War I credited with 20 confirmed and six unconfirmed aerial victories as the only German fighter pilot on the entire Macedonian front, where he was opposed by over 160 enemy aircraft. Among his aerial combats were three highly hazardous successful attacks on observation balloons serving as artillery direction posts. The fourth one he attacked was loaded with explosives; when it was detonated from the ground, it blew him out of the sky.

== The victory list ==
Confirmed victories in this list are numbered and listed chronologically, rather than in order of confirmation.

No.	Date	Foe	Location
Unconfirmed	25 October 1916	Nieuport 12	Drama, Greece
1	19 November 1916	Nieuport 12	Drama, Greece
2	27 December 1916	Farman	Drama Aerodrome
3	9 January 1917	Fsrman	Vicinity of Drama, Greece
4	18 February 1917	Royal Aircraft Factory BE.12	Drama, Greece
Unconfirmed	19 February 1917	Nieuport 12	Drama, Greece
Unconfirmed	8 March 1917	Nieuport 12	Lake Tahino
5	22 March 1917	Nieuport 12	Doksat, Greece
6	30 March 1917	Sopwith 1½ Strutter	Xanthi, Greece
7	10 May 1917	Royal Aircraft Factory BE.12	West of Lake Tahino
8	12 May 1917	Royal Aircraft Factory BE.12	Lake Tahino
9	20 May 1917	Farman	Offshore, northwest of Thasos, Greece
10	5 June 1917	Farman	Offshore of Kap Kojunnakla
11	11 June 1917	Royal Aircraft Factory FE	Ahinos
12	12 June 1917	Sopwith 1½ Strutter	Delta of the Mesta River
13	9 August 1917	Royal Aircraft Factory BE.12	Vicinity of Iveron
Unconfirmed	9 August 1917	Royal Aircraft Factory BE	Forced to land in British territory
14	20 August 1917	Sopwith Camel	Thasos Island, near Tasli
15	12 September 1917	Sopwith 1½ Strutter	Struma River Estuary
16	3 October 1917	Royal Aircraft Factory BE.2e	West of Sarmusakli, Greece
Unconfirmed	23 October 1917	Enemy airplane	Kopiva
17	28 October 1917	Observation balloon	Kopiva
Unconfirmed	9 November 1917	Observation balloon	Kopiva
18	15 November 1917	Observation balloon	Vicinity of Orljak
19	19 November 1917	Sopwith 1½ Strutter	Kalendra, west of Seres
20	21 November 1917	Observation balloon	Orljak

Abbreviations from sources utilized were expanded by editor creating this list.

== Bibliography ==
- Franks, Norman; Bailey, Frank; Guest, Russell (1993). Above the Lines: The Aces and Fighter Units of the German Air Service, Naval Air Service and Flanders Marine Corps, 1914–1918. London UK: Grub Street Publishing. ISBN 978-0-948817-73-1.
- Guttman, Jon (2005). Balloon-Busting Aces of World War 1. Osprey Publishing. ISBN 978-1-84176-877-9.
