= List of aerial victories of Olivier Freiherr von Beaulieu-Marconnay =

Olivier Freiherr von Beaulieu-Marconnay (1898-1918) was a German First World War fighter ace credited with 25 confirmed aerial victories. A trusted wingman for the redoubtable Rudolf Berthold, "Bauli" was World War I's youngest winner of Germany's highest award for valor, the Pour le Mérite, or Blue Max.

== The victory list ==
The victories of Olivier Freiherr von Beaulieu-Marconnay are reported in chronological order, which is not necessarily the order or dates the victories were confirmed by headquarters.

| No. | Date | Time | Foe | Unit | Location |
|---|---|---|---|---|---|
| 1 | 28 May 1918 | 1115 hours | Dorand AR2 | | Soissons, France |
| 2 | 6 June 1918 | 1105 hours | Airco DH.4 | No. 27 Squadron RAF | Assainvillers, France |
| 3 | 6 June 1918 | 1950 hours | Royal Aircraft Factory SE.5a | No. 32 Squadron RAF | Southwest of Montdidier, France |
| 4 | 7 June 1918 | 1150 hours | Sopwith Camel | No. 80 Squadron RAF | South of Noyon, France |
| 5 | 11 June 1918 | 1510 hours | Sopwith Camel | No. 73 Squadron RAF | Méry, France |
| 6 | 12 June 1918 | 1315 hours | Sopwith Camel | No. 43 Squadron RAF | Northeast of Rémy, France |
| 7 | 16 June 1918 | 1200 hours | Airco DH.4 | | Roye, France |
| 8 | 18 June 1918 | 1155 hours | Royal Aircraft Factory SE.5a | | Villers-Bretonneux, France |
| 9 | 9 August 1918 | 1800 hours | SPAD two-seater | | Northwest of Tricot, France |
| 10 | 9 August 1918 | 1815 hours | Sopwith Camel | No. 201 Squadron RAF | North of Beaucourt, France |
| Unconfirmed | 10 August 1918 | | Royal Aircraft Factory SE.5a | No. 56 Squadron RAF | Chaulnes, France |
| 11 | 11 August 1918 | 1240 hours | Royal Aircraft Factory SE.5a | No. 56 Squadron RAF | Gruny, France |
| 12 | 16 August 1918 | 1220 hours | SPAD | | Southeast of Tracy-le-Val, France |
| 13 | 21 August 1918 | 1650 hours | Bréguet 14 | | Chauny, France |
| 14 | 7 September 1918 | 1325 hours | Salmson 2A2 | | Northeast of Montsec, France |
| 15 | 13 September 1918 | 1720 hours | Bréguet | | Charay |
| 16 | 13 September 1918 | 1930 hours | SPAD | | Jaulny, France |
| 17 | 14 September 1918 | | Bréguet 14 | | Jonville, France |
| Unconfirmed | 15 September 1918 | | SPAD S.XIII | | Petry |
| 18 | 16 September 1918 | 1755 hours | Bréguet 14 | | Southwest of Briey, France |
| 19 | 16 September 1918 | | Bréguet 14 | | Fleville, France |
| Unconfirmed | 16 September 1918 | | Bréguet 14 | | |
| 20 | 23 September 1918 | 1010 hours | Bréguet 14 | 96th Aero Squadron USAAS | Pont-a-Mousson, France |
| 21 | 28 September 1918 | 1030 hours | SPAD S.XIII | | Dannevaux |
| 22 | 2 October 1918 | 1130 hours | Bréguet 14 | 96th Aero Squadron USAAS | Brabant |
| 23 | 3 October 1918 | 1630 hours | SPAD S.XIII | | Liny, France |
| 24 | 9 October 1918 | 1730 hours | SPAD S.XIII | | Crepion, France |
| 25 | 10 October 1918 | 1700 hours | SPAD S.XIII | | Landres, France |

Abbreviations were expanded by the editor creating this list.
