= List of aerial victories of Wilhelm Reinhard =

Wilhelm Reinhard was a German First World War fighter ace credited with 20 confirmed aerial victories.

== The victory list ==
Wilhelm Reinhard's victories are reported in chronological order, not the order or dates the victories were confirmed by headquarters.

No.	Date	Time	Foe	Unit	Location
1	22 July 1917	1130 hours	Sopwith 1½ Strutter	No. 45 Squadron RFC	Warneton, French/Belgian border
2	13 August 1917	1045 hours	Sopwith 1½ Strutter	No. 45 Squadron RFC	Grotenmolen
3	14 August 1917	1040 hours	Royal Aircraft Factory RE.8	No. 9 Squadron RFC	Boesinghe, Belgium
4	14 August 1917	1045 hours	SPAD	Escadrille SPA.73, Service Aéronautique	North of Boesinghe, Belgium
5	26 August 1917	1005 hours	Royal Aircraft Factory RE.8	No. 9 Squadron RFC	Bixschoote
6	1 September 1917	0815 hours	Sopwith Camel		Zonnebeke, Belgium
7	4 January 1918	1220 hours	Bristol F.2 Fighter		South of Niergnies, France
8	16 February 1918	1345 hours	Bristol F.2 Fighter	No. 48 Squadron RFC	West of Saint Quentin, France
9	18 March 1918	1105 hours	Airco DH.4	No. 4 Naval Squadron RNAS	Saint-Souplet, France
10	27 March 1918	1140 hours	Royal Aircraft Factory RE8		South of Morcourt, France
11	1 April 1918	1305 hours	Royal Aircraft Factory SE.5a	No. 56 Squadron RAF	Martinpuich, France
12	12 April 1918	1330 hours	SPAD		North of Roye, France
13	9 May 1918	2000 hours	Sopwith Camel	No. 43 Squadron RAF	West of Morlancourt, France
14	31 May 1918	1945 hours	SPAD 2-seater		Bonneserle
15	2 June 1918	1745 hours	SPAD 2-seater		South of Bonnes, France
16	2 June 1918	2030 hours	Bréguet 14		Buisson-de-Borny
17	2 June 1918	2100 hours	SPAD 2-seater		La Ferté-Milon, France
18	4 June 1918	1725 hours	SPAD 2-seater		Dammard, France
19	9 June 1918	0900 hours	SPAD		Dommieres
20	12 June 1918		SPAD 2-seater		

Abbreviations were expanded by the editor creating this list.

== Sources ==
- Franks, Norman; Bailey, Frank; Guest, Russell (1993). Above the Lines: The Aces and Fighter Units of the German Air Service, Naval Air Service and Flanders Marine Corps, 1914–1918. London UK: Grub Street Publishing. ISBN 978-0-948817-73-1.
