= List of aerial victories of Walter Göttsch =

Walter Göttsch (1896–1918) was a German First World War fighter ace credited with 20 confirmed aerial victories.

== The victory list ==
Walter Göttsch's victories are reported in chronological order, not the order or dates the victories were confirmed by headquarters.

No.	Date	Time	Foe	Unit	Location
1	14 November 1916		Belgian observation balloon (Note: Observation balloons were important artillery direction posts. Accordingly, they were prime targets for aerial attack, and were well defended by antiaircraft guns, small arms fire, and patrolling fighter planes.)		Oostvleteren
2	17 November 1916		Airco DH.2	No. 29 Squadron RFC	Southwest of Ypres, Belgium
3	5 January 1917	1100 hours	Royal Aircraft Factory BE.2e	No. 6 Squadron RFC	Voormezele
4	7 January 1917	1300 hours	Royal Aircraft Factory FE.2d	No. 20 Squadron RFC	Between Ypres, Belgium and Kemmel
5	1 February 1917	P.M.	Royal Aircraft Factory FE.2d	No. 20 Squadron RFC	East of Moorslede, Belgium
6	1 February 1917	P.M.	Royal Aircraft Factory FE.2d	No. 20 Squadron RFC	Bondues, France, north of Lille, France
Uncounted	7 March 1917		Runaway German observation balloon		
7	6 April 1917		Royal Aircraft Factory FE.2d	No. 20 Squadron RFC	Northeast of Polygon Wood
8	8 April 1917		Royal Aircraft Factory BE.2		East of Diksmuide, Belgium
9	24 April 1917	0910 hours	Royal Aircraft Factory FE.2d	No. 20 Squadron RFC	East of Ypres, Belgium
10	3 May 1917	P.M.	Royal Aircraft Factory FE.8		North of Lille, France
11	4 May 1917	1317 hours	Sopwith 1 1/2 Strutter		North of Lille, France
12	5 May 1917		Royal Aircraft Factory FE.2d	No. 20 Squadron RFC	Above Schaapbalie
13	17 July 1917	1250 hours	Nieuport		Southwest of Sint-Jan, also known as Saint-Jean
14	31 July 1917	1340 hours	Royal Aircraft Factory FE.2d	No. 20 Squadron RFC	Moorslede, Belgium
15	6 September 1917	0910 hours	Sopwith		Elverdinge
16	10 September 1917	1810 hours	SPAD		Frezenberg (also known as Frezenburg in English), Ypres
17	16 September 1917		Sopwith Camel	No. 70 Squadron RFC	Houthulst Forest, Belgium
18	31 March 1918		Dorand AR2		East of Montdidier, France
19	1 April 1918		Bréguet 14		Montdidier, France
20	10 April 1918		Royal Aircraft Factory RE.8		Amiens, France

Background information from Above the Lines and The Aerodrome website. Supplemental information cited in individual victories and claims. Abbreviations were expanded by the editor creating this list.

== Sources ==
- Franks, Norman; Bailey, Frank; Guest, Russell (1993). Above the Lines: The Aces and Fighter Units of the German Air Service, Naval Air Service and Flanders Marine Corps, 1914–1918. London UK: Grub Street Publishing. ISBN 978-0-948817-73-1.
- Guttman, Jon. Balloon-Busting Aces of World War 1 . Osprey Publishing, 2005. ISBN 1841768774, ISBN 978-1841768779
- VanWyngarden, Greg (2005). Jagdgeschwader II: Jagdgeschwader "Berthold". Oxford UK: Osprey Publishing. ISBN 9781841767277.
