= List of aerial victories of Georg von Hantelmann =

Georg von Hantelmann (1898-1924) was a German First World War fighter ace credited with 25 confirmed aerial victories. Most notably, he shot down ten opponents within a week, including three aces.

== The victory list ==
The victories of Georg von Hantelmann are reported in chronological order, which is not necessarily the order or dates the victories were confirmed by headquarters.

| No. | Date | Time | Foe | Unit | Location | Remarks |
|---|---|---|---|---|---|---|
| Unconfirmed | 29 May 1918 | | SPAD | | | |
| 1 | 6 June 1918 | 1140 hours | Airco DH.4 | No. 27 Squadron RAF | Ferrieres, France | |
| 2 | 10 June 1918 | 2010 hours | SPAD | | Plessis Brion, France | |
| 3 | 12 June 1918 | 1315 hours | Sopwith Camel | No. 43 Squadron RAF | Compiègne, France | |
| Unconfirmed | 12 June 1918 | | Bréguet 14 | | | |
| 4 | 18 June 1918 | 1135 hours | SPAD | | Ressons, France | |
| 5 | 26 June 1918 | | Bréguet 14 | 96th Aero Squadron USAAS | | |
| Unconfirmed | 16 August 1918 | 1220 hours | SPAD | | Carlepont, France | |
| 6 | 17 August 1918 | 1720 hours | SPAD | | West of Roye, France | |
| Unconfirmed | 2 September 1918 | | SPAD | | | |
| 7 | 12 September 1918 | 1135 hours | SPAD S.XIII | 93rd Aero Squadron USAAS | West of Conflans, France | |
| 8 | 12 September 1918 | 1935 hours | SPAD | 139th Aero Squadron USAAS | Limey, France | American ace David Endicott Putnam KIA |
| 9 | 13 September 1918 | 1805 hours | SPAD S.XIII | | Southwest of Thiaucourt, France | |
| 10 | 14 September 1918 | 0900 hours | Airco DH.4 | 11th Aero Squadron USAAS | North of Gorz | |
| 11 | 14 September 1918 | 1145 hours | SPAD S.XIII | | Saint-Benoît, France | |
| 12 | 14 September 1918 | 1615 hours | SPAD S.XIII | 22nd Aero Squadron USAAS | Lachaussee, France | |
| 13 | 15 September 1918 | 1215 hours | Airco DH.9 | No. 104 Squadron RAF | South of Metz, France | |
| 14 | 16 September 1918 | 1120 hours | SPAD | Escadrille Spa.77, Service Aéronautique | Southwest of Conflans | French ace Maurice Boyau KIA |
| 15 | 17 September 1918 | 1510 hours | SPAD | 95th Aero Squadron USAAS | North of Gorz | |
| 16 | 18 September 1918 | 1645 hours | SPAD | 27th Aero Squadron USAAS | Vionville, France | American ace Joseph Wehner KIA |
| 17 | 23 September 1918 | 1120 hours | Airco DH.4 | | South of Metz, France | |
| 18 | 26 September 1918 | 1215 hours | SPAD | 139th Aero Squadron USAAS | Étain, France | |
| 19 | 1 October 1918 | 1640 hours | SPAD | | Buzancy, France | |
| 20 | 9 October 1918 | 1615 hours | SPAD | | Montfaucon, France | |
| 21 | 18 October 1918 | 1625 hours | Airco DH.4 | | Grand Pre, France | |
| 22 | 21 October 1918 | 1615 hours | SPAD | | Remonville | |
| 23 | 22 October 1918 | 1700 hours | SPAD | 94th Aero Squadron | Brieulles, France | Raymond Saunders Billings, MT (KIA) |
| Unconfirmed | 30 October 1918 | | SPAD | | | |
| 24 | 30 October 1918 | | SPAD two-seater | 12th Aero Squadron USAAS | Buzancy | |
| 25 | 4 November 1918 | | SPAD | | | |

Abbreviations were expanded by the editor creating this list.
