= List of aerial victories of Oskar Hennrich =

Oskar Hennrich was a German First World War fighter ace credited with 20 confirmed aerial victories. As one of the foremost German balloon busters, he destroyed 13 of the crucial intelligence posts despite their being heavily defended.

== The victory list ==
Oskar Hennrich's victories are reported in chronological order, not the order or dates the victories were confirmed by headquarters.

No.	Date	Time	Foe	Unit	Location
1	14 May 1918		Observation balloon	1st Section, 18th Company, 3rd Balloon Wing	West of Albert, France
2	18 May 1918	a.m.	Sopwith Camel	No. 65 Squadron RAF	Southeast of Albert, France
3	29 May 1918		Observation balloon		Northwest of Albert, France
Unconfirmed	29 May 1918		Observation balloon		Northwest of Albert, France
4	30 July 1918		Royal Aircraft Factory RE.8		Northwest of the Roman Road
5	1 August 1918	1755 hours	Observation balloon	43rd Section, 15th Company, 5th Balloon Wing	Southwest of Bonnay, France
6	1 August 1918	1758 hours	Observation balloon		Daours, France
7	8 August 1918		Royal Aircraft Factory SE.5a		Morcourt, France
8	9 August 1918		Sopwith Camel		
9	18 August 1918	1845 hours	Observation balloon	12th Section, 16th Company, 5th Balloon Wing	Marcelcave, France
Unconfirmed	21 August 1918	1830 hours	Two-seated reconnaissance aircraft		Ayette, France
10	25 August 1918	1210 hours	Observation balloon	1st Section, 18th Company, 3rd Balloon Wing	West of Albert, France
11	3 September 1918	2035 hours	Royal Aircraft Factory SE.5a		Southwest of Noreuil, France
12	6 September 1918	1455 hours	Observation balloon	14th Section, 4th Wing, 5th Balloon Wing	South of Le Mesnil
13	15 September 1918	1540 hours	Observation balloon	44th Section, 19th Company, 5th Balloon Wing	Bertincourt, France
14	24 September 1918	1120 hours	Observation balloon	31st Section, 18th Company, 3rd Balloon Wing	Étricourt-Manancourt, France
15	24 September 1918	1610 hours	Observation balloon	1st Section 18th Company, 3rd Balloon Wing	Fins, France
16	24 September 1918	1612 hours	British Observation balloon		Fins, France
17	26 September 1918	1645 hours	Observation balloon	6th Section, 15th Company, 5th Balloon Wing	Lieramont, France
18	27 September 1918	1600 hours	Bristol F.2 Fighter	No. 22 Squadron RAF	Neuvilly, France
19	29 September 1918	1020 hours	Royal Aircraft Factory SE.5a		
20	1 October 1918	1610 hours	Observation balloon	31st Section, 18th Company, 3rd Balloon Wing	Gouzeaucourt, France

Background information from Above the Lines and The Aerodrome website. Abbreviations were expanded by the editor creating this list.

== Sources ==
- Franks, Norman; Bailey, Frank; Guest, Russell (1993). Above the Lines: The Aces and Fighter Units of the German Air Service, Naval Air Service and Flanders Marine Corps, 1914–1918. London UK: Grub Street Publishing. ISBN 978-0-948817-73-1.

== Further readinbg ==
- Guttman, Jon. Balloon-Busting Aces of World War 1 . Osprey Publishing, 2005. ISBN 1841768774, ISBN 978-1841768779
