= List of aerial victories of Hans Martin Pippart =

Hans Martin Pippart (1888-1918) was a German First World War fighter ace credited with confirmed aerial victories over 15 enemy airplanes and seven observation balloons. Unusually, he first became an ace before joining a fighter squadron, scoring six victories with Kampfstaffel 1. Also unusually, he destroyed four observation balloons in this string of six victories. After a transfer to Jagdstaffel 13, he scored his first four victories as a fighter pilot. Transferred to command Jagdstaffel 19, he would score 12 more wins before his death in action on 11 August 1918.

== The victory list ==
Hans Martin Pippart's victories are reported in chronological order, which is not necessarily the order or dates the victories were confirmed by headquarters.

No.	Date	Time	Foe	Unit	Location
1	25 May 1917		Farman		Troscianiac, northwest of Silvko
2	20 June 1917		Observation balloon (Note: With their wide fields of view, observers in observation balloons were deadly components for artillery direction. The balloons were accordingly well defended by anti-aircraft guns and patrolling fighters (per Guttman, pp. 7-9))		Kolodzie Jowska
3	26 June 1917		Observation balloon		Delejow, near Lany
4	25 August 1917		Observation balloon		Ryngacz, east of Czernowitz
5	4 October 1917		Sopwith		Cermanowka
6	23 October 1917		Observation balloon		Syzrowzy
7	21 February 1918	1635 hours	Observation balloon	3rd Section, 13th Company, 5th Balloon Wing (British)	Northwest of La Fere, France
8	6 March 1918	1040 hours	Royal Aircraft Factory SE.5a		Fort Mayot, France
9	1 April 1918	1820 hours	Observation balloon	89 Compagnie, Service Aéronautique	West of Montdidier, France
10	20 April 1918	1500 hours	Bréguet 14		West of Chauny, France
11	2 May 1918	1315 hours	Bréguet 14		Between Roye, France and Noyon, France
12	4 May 1918	2000 hours	SPAD S.XIII	Escadrille Spa.77, Service Aéronautique	Southeast of Montdidier, France
13	6 May 1918	2030 hours	SPAD S.XIII	Escadrille Spa.96, Service Aéronautique	Northwest of Montdidier, France
14	30 May 1918		Bréguet 14		Between Charlepont and Cuts, France
15	12 June 1918		Royal Aircraft Factory SE.5a	No. 2 Squadron AFC	Lagny, France
16	15 July 1918		SPAD S.XIII		Northwest of Sainte-Menehould, France
17	16 July 1918		SPAD S.XII		Suippes, France
18	17 July 1918	1215 hours	Bréguet 14		
19	19 July 1918	1930 hours	SPAD S.XIII	Escadrille SPA.85, Service Aéronautique	Between Chassins and Dormans, France
20	22 July 1918	1030 hours	Caudron R.11		Between Dormans, France and Moumelon
21	22 July 1918	1035 hours	SPAD S.XIII		Moumelon
22	11 August 1918	1700 hours	Observation balloon	12th Section, 16th Company, 5th Balloon Wing (British)	Vrely, France

Abbreviations were expanded by the editor creating this list.

== Sources ==
- Franks, Norman; Bailey, Frank; Guest, Russell (1993). Above the Lines: The Aces and Fighter Units of the German Air Service, Naval Air Service and Flanders Marine Corps, 1914–1918. London UK: Grub Street Publishing. ISBN 978-0-948817-73-1.
- Guttman, Jon (2005). Balloon-Busting Aces of World War 1. Oxford UK, Osprey Publishing. ISBN 978-1-84176-877-9.
