= List of aerial victories of Hans Ritter von Adam =

Hans Ritter von Adam (1886–1917) was a German First World War fighter ace credited with confirmed aerial victories over 20 enemy airplanes and an observation balloon.

== The victory list ==
Hans Ritter von Adam's victories are reported in chronological order, which is not necessarily the order or dates the victories were confirmed by headquarters.

No.	Date	Time	Foe	Unit	Location
1	24 March 1917	1235 hours	Caudron G.4	Escadrille C.18, Service Aéronautique	Woëvre
2	14 April 1917		Observation balloon (Note: Observers in balloon gondolas could direct deadly accurate artillery barrages. They were heavily defended by antiaircraft guns and patrolling fighter planes (per Guttman p. 7-9).)	57 Compagnie, Service Aéronautique	Verdun, France
3	3 June 1917		Caudron G.4		West of Belrupt, France
4	12 July 1917	1835 hours	Sopwith 1 1/2 Strutter	No. 43 Squadron RFC	Dikkebus (Dickebusch), Belgium
5	13 July 1917	1135 hours	Nieuport 17	No. 29 Squadron RFC	East of Polygon Wood
6	16 July 1917	2005 hours	Sopwith Camel		Ypres, Belgium
7	20 July 1917	0740 hours	Royal Aircraft Factory FE.2d	No. 20 Squadron RFC	Southwest of Ypres, Belgium
8	25 July 1917	1820 hours	SPAD	No. 19 Squadron RFC	Vicinity of Ypres, Belgium
9	28 July 1917	1210 hours	Nieuport 17	No. 29 Squadron RFC	Beselare (Becelaere), Belgium
10	28 July 1917	1855 hours	Airco DH.4		Oostroosebeke, Belgium
11	12 August 1917	2100 hours	Airco DH.4		Poperinge, Belgium
12	14 August 1917	1930 hours	Royal Aircraft Factory SE.5	No. 56 Squadron RFC	Houthulst Forest, Belgium
13	31 August 1917	1950 hours	Royal Aircraft Factory SE.5	No. 56 Squadron RFC	Zonnebeke, Belgium
14	3 September 1917	1950 hours	Nieuport Scout	No. 1 Squadron RFC	Koelenburg
15	15 September 1917	1900 hours	Sopwith Camel	No. 70 Squadron RFC	North of Ypres, Belgium
16	19 September 1917	1000 hours	Royal Aircraft Factory RE.8	No. 4 Squadron RFC	West of Ypres, Belgium
17	19 September 1917	1005 hours	Sopwith Camel	No. 10 Naval Squadron RNAS	Houthulst Forest
18	20 September 1917	0940 hours	Airco DH.5	No. 32 Squadron RFC	West of Zonnebeke, Belgium
19	20 September 1917	0950 hours	Royal Aircraft Factory SE.5	No. 60 Squadron RFC	Zonnebeke, Belgium
20	23 September 1917	1045 hours	Royal Aircraft Factory RE.8		North of Ypres, Belgium
21	6 November 1917	0850 hours	Nieuport Scout	No. 29 Squadron RFC	West of Passchendaele

Abbreviations were expanded by the editor creating this list.
