= List of aerial victories of Fritz Pütter =

Fritz Pütter (1895–1918) was a German First World War fighter ace credited with 25 confirmed aerial victories, including eight observation balloons. Notably, he began his combat career by the rare feat of downing five observation balloons to become an ace. After scoring ten victories with Jagdstaffel 9, he was transferred to command another fighter squadron, Jagdstaffel 68, to score his remaining triumphs. On 16 July 1918, incendiary ammunition aboard his airplane was set off by extremely hot weather, inflicting lingering mortal wounds on Pütter.

== The victory list ==
The victories of Fritz Pütter are reported in chronological order, which is not necessarily the order or dates the victories were confirmed by headquarters.

No.	Date	Time	Foe	Unit	Location
1	14 April 1917	1140 hours	Observation balloon (Note: With their wide fields of view, observers in observation balloons were deadly components for artillery direction. The balloons were accordingly well defended by antiaircraft guns and patrolling fighters (per Guttman, pp. 7-9))	48 Compagnie, Service Aéronautique	East of Suippes, France
2	18 August 1917	1535 hours	Observation balloon	48 Compagnie, Service Aéronautique	South of Vauquois, France and Parois, France
3	19 August 1917	1500 hours	Observation balloon	48 Compagnie, Service Aéronautique	Between Vraincourt, France and Brancourt, France
4	1 November 1917	1225 hours	Observation balloon	65 Compagnie, Service Aéronautique	Between Massiges, France and Saint-Jean, France
5	1 November 1917	1226 hours	Observation balloon	67 Compagnie, Service Aéronautique	Hans, France
6	12 January 1918		SPAD		Binarville, France
7	12 January 1918	1205 hours	Observation balloon	53 Compagnie, Service Aéronautique	Mourmelon-le-Petit, France
8	14 January 1918	1030 hours	Observation balloon	56 Compagnie, Service Aéronautique	Vraincourt, France
9	19 January 1918	1610 hours	Nieuport		East of Tahure
10	27 January 1918	1730 hours	Nieuport		Dontrien, France
11	18 March 1918		Airco DH.5		Beaurevoir, France
12	21 March 1918	1430 hours	Royal Aircraft Factory SE.5a		Holnon Wood, France
13	24 March 1918	1700 hours	Sopwith Camel	No. 73 Squadron RFC	Assevillers, France
14	30 March 1918	0950 hours	Observation balloon	64 Compagnie, Service Aéronautique	Assainvillers, France
15	31 March 1918	1410 hours	Bréguet 14		Guerbigny, France
16	3 April 1918		SPAD S.XIII		Hergicourt
17	6 April 1918		SPAD S.XIII	Escadrille Spa.154, Service Aéronautique	Moreuil, France
18	7 April 1918	1540 hours	Caudron R.9	Escadrille C.66, Service Aéronautique	Moreuil, France
19	7 April 1918	1545 hours	Royal Aircraft Factory SE.5a	No. 24 Squadron RAF	Moreuil, France
20	11 April 1918	1925 hours	Sopwith Camel	No. 73 Squadron RAF	Villers-aux-Erables, France
21	12 April 1918	1810 hours	Royal Aircraft Factory SE.5a	No. 84 Squadron RAF	Villers-aux-Erables
22	3 May 1918	1025 hours	SPAD S.XIII		Southeast of Mailly, France
23	19 May 1918	1040 hours	Royal Aircraft Factory SE.5a	No. 84 Squadron RAF	Bois de Hangard
24	30 May 1918	1120 hours	Bristol F.2 Fighter	No. 48 Squadron RAF	Between Castel and Montigny
25	30 May 1918	1305 hours	SPAD		Lassigny, France

Abbreviations were expanded by the editor creating this list.

== Sources ==
- Franks, Norman; Bailey, Frank; Guest, Russell (1993). Above the Lines: The Aces and Fighter Units of the German Air Service, Naval Air Service and Flanders Marine Corps, 1914–1918. London UK: Grub Street Publishing. ISBN 978-0-948817-73-1.
- Guttman, Jon (2005). Balloon-Busting Aces of World War 1. Oxford UK, Osprey Publishing. ISBN 978-1-84176-877-9.
