= List of aerial victories of Fritz Otto Bernert =

Fritz Otto Bernert was a German fighter ace of the First World War, notable for shooting down five enemy airplanes in 20 minutes. Invalided from infantry service after suffering four wounds, he turned to aviation service. Despite wearing pince-nez and having the use of only one arm, he became a pilot. After his first victory with Kampfeinsitzerkommando Vaux, he switched to Jagdstaffel 4, scoring six more victories during 1916. In 1917, he claimed an additional 20 victories between March and May 1917.

== The victory list ==
This list is complete for entries, though obviously not for all details. Doubled lines in list marks transition between units. Data was abstracted from Above the Lines: The Aces and Fighter Units of the German Air Service, Naval Air Service and Flanders Marine Corps, 1914–1918, ISBN 0-948817-73-9, ISBN 978-0-948817-73-1, p. 70, and from The Aerodrome webpage Abbreviations from those sources were expanded by editor creating this list.

No.	Date/time	Victim	Squadron	Location
1	17 April 1916	Nieuport		
2	6 September 1916	Caudron		Dompierre, France
3	11 September 1916 @ 1100 hours	Nieuport		Allenes
4	21 October 1916 @ 1630 hours	Caudron		Chaulnes, France
5	9 November 1916 @ 1030 hours	Airco DH.2	No. 29 Squadron RFC	La Sars
6	Afternoon of 9 November 1916	Airco DH.2	No. 40 Squadron RFC	Haplincourt, France
7	Afternoon of 9 November 1916	Royal Aircraft Factory F.E.8	No. 29 Squadron RFC	Martinpuich, France
8	19 March 1917 @ 0925 hours	Sopwith		Écourt-Mory
9	24 March 1917 @ 1630 hours	Royal Aircraft Factory B.E.2d		Pronville, France
10	1 April 1917 @ 1045 hours	Observation balloon		Villers-au-Flers
11	2 April 1917 @ 0830 hours	Nieuport		Queant, France
12	3 April 1917 @ 1910 hours	Observation balloon		Ervillers, France
13	3 April 1917 @ 1912 hours	Observation balloon		Northwest of Bapaume
14	6 April 1917 @ 1015 hours	Royal Aircraft Factory R.E.8	No. 59 Squadron RFC	Rouex
15	7 April 1917 @ 1715 hours	Nieuport		Rouex
16	8 April 1917 @ 1510 hours	Bristol F.2 Fighter	No. 48 Squadron RFC	Remy, France
17	8 April 1917 @ 1515 hours	Nieuport 12	No. 46 Squadron RFC	Remy, France
18	11 April 1917 @ 1230 hours	Royal Aircraft Factory FE.2b		Arras, France
19	11 April 1917 @ 1240 hours	Morane Type P	No. 3 Squadron RFC	Moreuil, France
20	24 April 1917 @ 0830 hours	Sopwith 1 1/2 Strutter	No. 70 Squadron RFC	Vaucelles, France
21	24 April 1917 @ 0840 hours	Royal Aircraft Factory B.E.2e	No. 9 Squadron RFC	East of Joncourt, France
22	24 April 1917 @ 0842 hours	Royal Aircraft Factory B.E.2e	No. 9 Squadron RFC	West of Bellincourt
23	24 April 1917 @ 0845 hours	Royal Aircraft Factory B.E.2e	No. 9 Squadron RFC	West of Boni
24	24 April 1917 @ 0850 hours	Airco DH.4	No. 55 Squadron RFC	North of Levergies, France
25	2 May 1917 @ 0830 hours	Nieuport		South of Saint-Quentin, France
26	4 May 1917 @ 1845 hours	Observation balloons		Vauxtin, France
27	7 May 1917 @ 1540 hours	Royal Aircraft Factory B.E.2e		North of Saint-Quentin, France
Unconfirmed	19 May 1917 @ 1720 hours	Royal Aircraft Factory B.E.2b	No. 22 Squadron RFC	Villers-Guislain, France
