= List of aerial victories of Max Näther =

Max Näther (1899–1919) was a German First World War fighter ace credited with 26 confirmed aerial victories. Between 16 May and 29 October 1918, he shot down 16 enemy airplanes, including 11 first-rate fighters—ten SPAD S.XIIIs and a Sopwith Dolphin. He also destroyed ten observation balloons; they were crucial artillery observation and direction posts. As such, they were so heavily defended that attacks on them were considered near-suicidal. In addition to carefully calibrated antiaircraft guns defending these posts, a fighter patrol usually lurked nearby to pounce on intruders.

== The victory list ==
The victories of Max Näther are reported in chronological order, which is not necessarily the order or dates the victories were confirmed by headquarters.

No.	Date	Time	Foe	Unit	Location
1	16 May 1918	1100 hours	SPAD S.XIII		Trigneires
2	1 June 1918		Observation balloon	54 Compagnie, Service Aéronautique	Cuvilly, France
3	5 June 1918	1445 hours	French observation balloon		Cuvilly, France
4	7 June 1918		Observation balloon		Montigny, France
5	16 June 1918	1002 hours	Observation balloon		Amienois
6	27 June 1918	0951 hours	Observation balloon		Ailly, France
7	28 June 1918	0915 hours	Observation balloon	51 Compagnie, Service Aéronautique	Mesnil, France
8	1 July 1918	1250 hours	Sopwith Dolphin	No. 23 Squadron RAF	Guerbigny, France
9	15 July 1918	1500 hours	SPAD S.XIII		Prosnes, France
10	16 July 1918	1217 hours	SPAD S.XIII		Thuizy
11	22 July 1918	1250 hours	SPAD S.XIII		Courtagnon, France
12	6 September 1918	1842 hours	Bréguet 14		Silllery
13	14 September 1918	1635 hours	Observation balloon	76 Compagnie, Service Aéronautique	Mailly, France
14	26 September 1918	0710 hours	SPAD S.XIII		Trescauvoux
15	26 September 1918	1535 hours	Observation Balloon		Thienville (Thionville?)
16	26 September 1918	1545 hours	SPAD S.XIII		Avencourt
17	27 September 1918		SPAD S.XIII		Montzeille
18	9 October 1918	1740 hours	Observation balloon	7th United States Balloon Company	Montfaucon, France
19	9 October 1918	1745 hours	SPAD S.XIII		Montfaucon, France
20	10 October 1918	1203 hours	Bréguet 14		Haumont, France
21	10 October 1918	1223 hours	SPAD S.XI		Haumont, France
22	18 October 1918	1425 hours	SPAD S.XIII		Gercourt, France
23	23 October 1918	1340 hours	Observation balloon	7th United States Balloon Company	Cierges, France
24	29 October 1918		SPAD S.XIII		Exermont, France
25	29 October 1918		Airco DH.9		Sivry
26	29 October 1918		Airco DH.9		Montfaucon, France

Abbreviations were expanded by the editor creating this list.
