= List of aerial victories of Carl Menckhoff =

List of victories of Carl Menckhoff

Carl Menckhoff was a German flying ace of the First World War. He scored 20 aerial victories as a sergeant-pilot for Jagdstaffel 3 before becoming an officer commanding Jagdstaffel 72. While leading this fighter squadron, he scored 19 more aerial victories. His 39 aerial victories are listed below.

This list is complete for entries, though obviously not for all details. Doubled lines in list marks transition between jagdstaffeln. Information was abstracted from Above the Lines: The Aces and Fighter Units of the German Air Service, Naval Air Service and Flanders Marine Corps, 1914–1918, ISBN 0-948817-73-9, ISBN 978-0-948817-73-1, pp. 163–164, and from The Aerodrome webpage Abbreviations from those sources were expanded by editor creating this list.

| No. | Date/time | Victim | Squadron | Location |
|---|---|---|---|---|
| 1 | 5 April 1917 @ 1915 hours | Nieuport 23 | No. 29 Squadron RFC | Athies, France |
| 2 | 6 April 1917 @ 1030 hours | Royal Aircraft Factory R.E.8 | No. 59 Squadron RFC | Thélus-Rouvroy, France |
| 3 | 30 April 1917 @ 1850 hours | Nieuport 17 | No. 29 Squadron RFC | Cantin, France |
| 4 | 7 May 1917 @ 1500 hours | Royal Aircraft Factory R.E.8 | | Tilloy, France |
| 5 | 9 May 1917 @ 0850 hours | Sopwith Triplane | No. 8 (Naval) Squadron | Farbus, France |
| 6 | 28 July 1917 @ 1120 hours | Sopwith Camel | | Gravenstafel, Belgium |
| 7 | 26 August 1917 @ 0645 hours | SPAD VII | No. 19 Squadron RFC | Zonnebeke, Belgium |
| 8 | 26 August 1917 @ 1005 hours | Royal Aircraft Factory R.E.8 | No. 9 Squadron RFC | Langemarck, Belgium |
| 9 | 11 September 1917 @ 0950 hours | Sopwith Camel | No. 45 Squadron RFC | Moorseele, Belgium |
| 10 | 13 September 1917 @ 1520 hours | SPAD | | Zillebeke, Belgium |
| 11 | 14 September 1917 @ 1905 hours | Royal Aircraft Factory S.E.5a | No. 56 Squadron RFC | De Ruiter |
| 12 | 25 September 1917 @ 1525 hours | SPAD | | Nordschoote, Belgium |
| 13 | 12 October 1917 @ 1020 hours | Sopwith Triplane | No. 1 (Naval) Squadron | Zonnebeke, Belgium |
| 14 | 12 October 1917 @ 1025 hours | Royal Aircraft Factory R.E.8 | No. 4 Squadron RFC | Broodseinde, Belgium |
| 15 | 27 October 1917 @ 1550 hours | Royal Aircraft Factory S.E.5a | No. 60 Squadron RFC | Bellewarde |
| 16 | 28 November 1917 @ 1140 hours | Bristol F.2 Fighter | Possibly No. 9 Squadron RFC | Pilckem, Belgium |
| 17 | 5 December 1917 @ 1015 hours | Royal Aircraft Factory S.E.5a | | Passchendaele, France |
| 18 | 29 December 1917 @ 1120 hours | SPAD VII | No. 19 Squadron RFC | Draaibank |
| 19 | 22 January 1918 @ 1305 hours | Armstrong Whitworth F.K.8 | No. 35 Squadron RFC | South of Draaibank |
| 20 | 4 February 1918 @ 1220 hours | Royal Aircraft Factory S.E.5a | | Poelcapelle, Belgium |
| 21 | 1 April 1918 | Breguet 14 | | Mesnil, France |
| 22 | 6 April 1918 | Letord | | |
| 23 | 7 April 1918 | | | Montdidier, France |
| 24 | 11 April 1918 @ 1535 hours | Nieuport | | Belle Assise |
| 25 | 22 April 1918 @ 1840 hours | SPAD | | Godenvillers, France |
| 26 | 19 May 1918 @ 1840 hours | SPAD | | |
| 27 | 21 May 1918 | Breguet 14 | | |
| 28 | 31 May 1918 | SPAD | | Soissons, France |
| 29 | 1 June 1918 | Breguet 14 | | Soissons, France |
| 30 | 2 June 1918 | SPAD | | |
| 31 | 2 June 1918 | Sopwith Camel | | Forêt de Laigue, France |
| 32 | 5 June 1918 | Breguet 14 | | Saint-Leger |
| 33 | Afternoon of 11 June 1918 | Sopwith Camel | No. 73 Squadron RAF | Faverolles, France |
| 34 | 15 June 1918 | SPAD | | Rethondes, France |
| 35 | 4 July 1918 @ 2000 hours | Sopwith Camel | No. 54 Squadron RAF | Estrées, France |
| 36 | 15 July 1918 | SPAD | | Bony, France |
| 37 | 15 July 1918 | SPAD | | |
| 38 | 16 July 1918 | SPAD | | Reims |
| 39 | 19 July 1918 @ 1225 hours | SPAD | | South of Mont Voisin |
