= Sarcy =

- Commune
- Location of Sarcy
- Location within France Location within Grand Est
- Coordinates: 49°12′27″N 3°49′32″E
- Country: France
- Region: Grand Est
- Department: Marne
- Arrondissement: Reims
- Canton: Dormans-Paysages de Champagne
- Intercommunality: CU Grand Reims

Government
  - Mayor (2020–2026): Thierry Jobart
- Area^{1}: 6.9 km^{2} (2.7 sq mi)
- Elevation: 110 m (360 ft)
- Population (2023): 268
  - Density: 39/km^{2} (100/sq mi)
- Time zone: UTC+01:00 (CET)
  - Summer (DST): UTC+02:00 (CEST)
- INSEE/Postal code: 51523 /51170
- ^{1} French Land Register data, which excludes lakes, ponds, glaciers > 1 km^{2} (0.386 sq mi or 247 acres) and river estuaries.

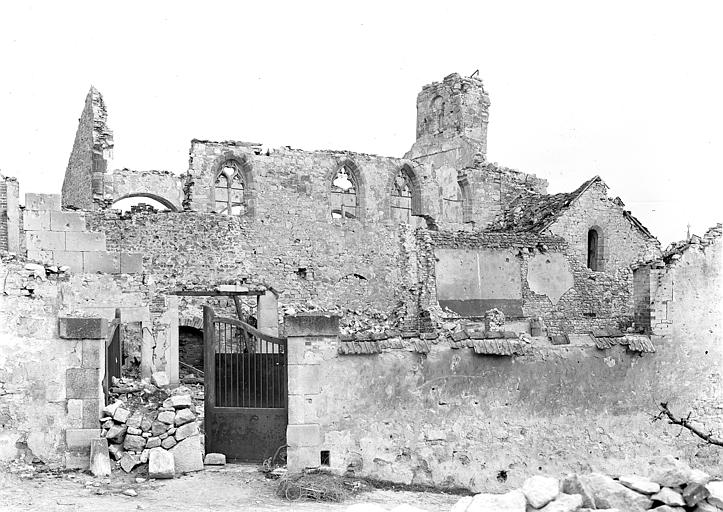
A church in the southern part of Sarcy

Sarcy (French pronunciation: [saʁsi]) is a commune in the Marne department in north-eastern France.

== See also ==
- Communes of the Marne department
- Montagne de Reims Regional Natural Park
