= Sommepy-Tahure =

- Commune
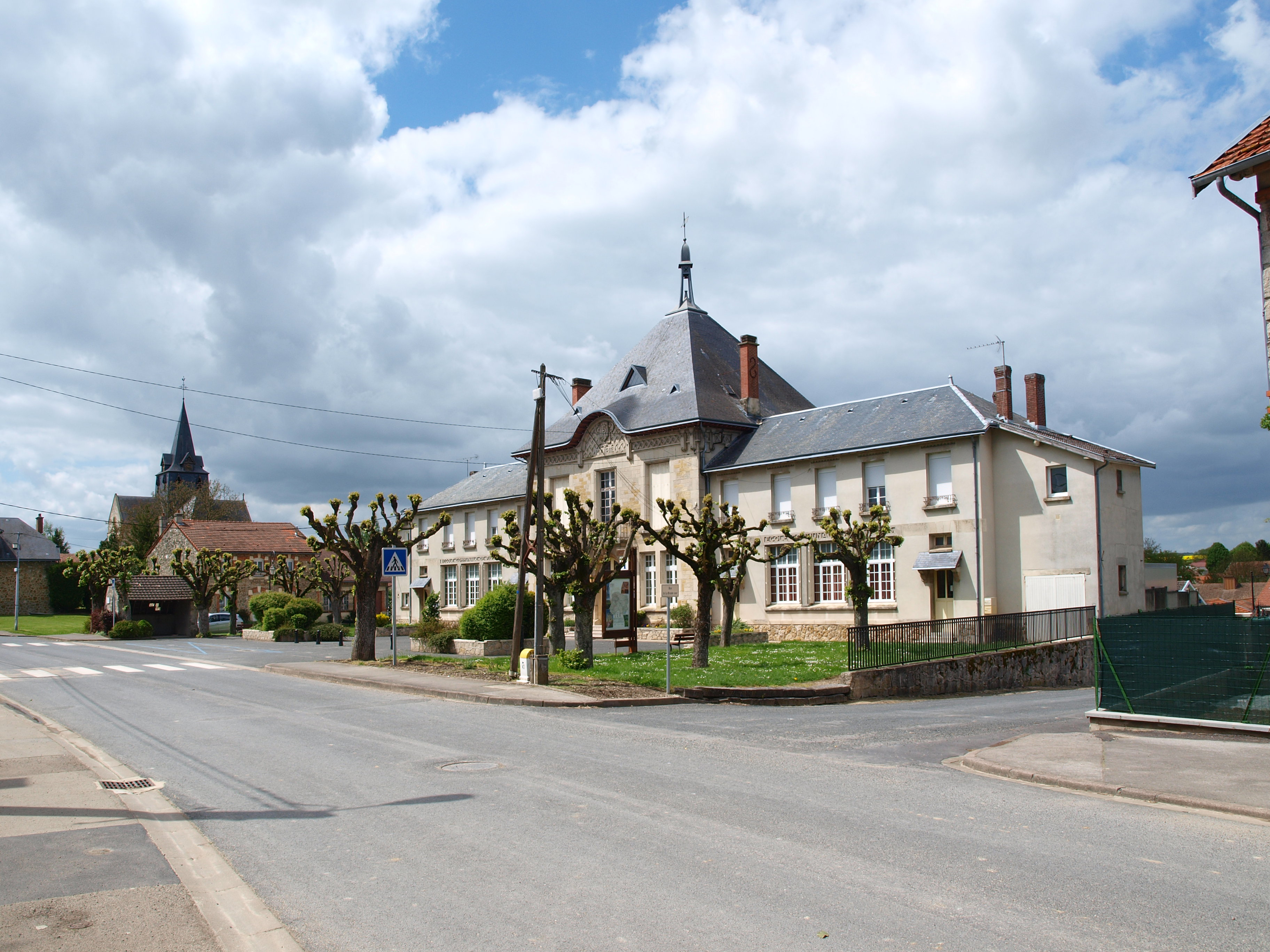
- The town hall in Sommepy-Tahure
- Location of Sommepy-Tahure
- Location within France Location within Grand Est
- Coordinates: 49°15′09″N 4°33′29″E
- Country: France
- Region: Grand Est
- Department: Marne
- Arrondissement: Châlons-en-Champagne
- Canton: Argonne Suippe et Vesle
- Intercommunality: Région de Suippes

Government
  - Mayor (2020–2026): Olivier Soudant
- Area^{1}: 68.24 km^{2} (26.35 sq mi)
- Elevation: 140 m (460 ft)
- Highest elevation: 210 m (690 ft)
- Population (2023): 663
  - Density: 9.72/km^{2} (25.2/sq mi)
- Time zone: UTC+01:00 (CET)
  - Summer (DST): UTC+02:00 (CEST)
- INSEE/Postal code: 51544 /51600
- ^{1} French Land Register data, which excludes lakes, ponds, glaciers > 1 km^{2} (0.386 sq mi or 247 acres) and river estuaries.

Sommepy-Tahure (French pronunciation: [sɔmpi tayʁ]) is a commune in the Marne department in north-eastern France. It was formed in 1950 by the merger of the former communes Sommepy and Tahure which were both destroyed during World War I.

== See also ==
- Communes of the Marne department
