= Dennis Waight =

British military officer (1895-1984)

Dennis Edward Francis Waight
- Born: 15 February 1895; London, England
- Died: October 1984 (aged 89); Liskeard, Cornwall, England
- Military career
- Allegiance: United Kingdom
- Branch: British Army; Royal Air Force
- Service years: 1914–1955
- Rank: Colonel
- Units: Northumberland Fusiliers, No. 22 Squadron RAF
- Conflicts: World War I World War II
- Awards: Military Cross

Colonel Dennis Edward Francis Waight MC (15 February 1895 – October 1984) was a British Army professional infantryman. After being decorated for valor while serving as a fusilier early in World War I, he flew in combat as an aerial observer until war's end. No details of his transfer and training are known; however, he was credited with 12 aerial victories, making him a flying ace.

He continued in service both at home and in India through, and beyond, World War II, finally being retired from service postwar for age.

== Early life ==
Waight was reared in St John's Wood, London. He was a member of Beevors House at Aldenham School, which he attended from 1911–1913. He played first string football while there.

== World War I ==
Waight was commissioned as a temporary second lieutenant on 22 September 1914. Waight was serving as a temporary lieutenant when he was promoted to temporary captain on 16 September 1916 while he was serving in the Northumberland Fusiliers.

He earned a Military Cross while serving with the unit; he then transferred to the Royal Flying Corps in March 1918. His Military Cross was gazetted on 3 June 1918 in the 1918 Birthday Honours.

Waight was assigned to 22 Squadron as an observer; he sat in the back seat of a two-seated Bristol F.2 Fighter and manned the rear machine guns to ward off attacks from behind. On 10 July 1918, Waight scored his first victory while piloted by ace T. W. Martin; he drove down a German Pfalz D.III fighter over Lille.

Waight would not score again until he was involved in the British offensive at the Battle of Amiens. On 8 August 1918, while piloted by William Frederick James Harvey, Waight shared in the destruction of two Pfalz D.IIIs in a dogfight northeast of Vitry; at least one of the shared wins was credited to another crew from 22 Squadron, John Everard Gurdon and Charles George Gass. On the evening of 11 August, he sent down a Fokker D.VII out of control southeast of Armentières, France for his fourth win. On the 13th, he destroyed a Rumpler and drove down its Pfalz D.III escort out of control northwest of Cambrai for victories five and six. The next day, a German two-seater fell from his guns, out of control southwest of Lille. Two days later, Waight destroyed a Pfalz D.III southeast of Lille. On 21 August, the victim was another unidentified German two-seater down out of control, this time over Ervillers. The next day, 22 August 1918, the crew of Waight and Harvey scored their last victory together; teamed with other crews from 22 Squadron, they destroyed a Halberstadt reconnaissance two-seater northeast of Bailleul. Waight finished out August 1918 by destroying a Fokker D.VII over Douai while piloted by South African ace Ian Oliver Stead

Waight would score one more victory, a week before the Armistice; piloted by Stanley Wallage, he drove down a Pfalz D.XII out of control northwest of Bavay for the final victory for both himself and his squadron. Waight's personal victory score tallied as six enemy planes destroyed, two of which were shared; he also drove down six enemy planes out of control.

== Post World War I ==
On 16 March 1922, Lieutenant Waight's commission as second lieutenant in the Fusiliers was backdated to 22 June 1915.

On 28 March 1922, his commission as lieutenant was backdated to 1 July 1917 and his precedence ranked on that day's seniority list. The following day, he was promoted to captain.

On 13 November 1929, Captain Waight was seconded from the Northumberland Fusiliers to staff duty. He vacated his appointment on the Indian Army staff on 1 March 1931, and returned to the Fusiliers the next day.

On 11 January 1932, he was appointed adjutant of the Fusiliers' 6th Battalion. The next issue of the London Gazette specified that his service as Adjutant would be with the Territorial Army. Waight was relieved from his post of Adjutant on 11 January 1936. He returned to his regimental establishment 21 January 1936. On 29 September 1936, Waight was promoted to Major–still in the Fusiliers.

== World War II and beyond ==
On 16 November 1942, Major Waight became Lieutenant Colonel Waight.

On 16 November 1945, Waight was retained on full pay as a supernumerary.

On 28 September 1947, Lieutenant Colonel Waight was retired as too old to continue serving his nation. He was granted a retirement promotion to honorary colonel.

His release from the Reserve of Officers, based on his age, came on 15 February 1950.

Colonel Waight died in Liskeard, Cornwall in October 1984.
