= William Frederick James Harvey =

British flying ace in World War I

- Born: 8 January 1897; Portslade, Sussex, England
- Died: 21 July 1972 (aged 75); Wingham, Kent, England
- Military career
- Allegiance: United Kingdom
- Branch: Royal Flying Corps; Royal Air Force; Royal Artillery
- Service years: 1914–1919; 1939–1952
- Rank: Major
- Nickname: Jim
- Conflicts: World War I World War II
- Awards: Distinguished Flying Cross & Bar; Military Cross; Member of the Order of the British Empire

William Frederick James Harvey (8 January 1897 – 21 July 1972) was a British flying ace in World War I credited with twenty-six victories. He was the first recipient of the Distinguished Flying Cross & Bar and was also awarded the Military Cross.

== Involvement in World War I ==
Harvey served with the Signal Company of the Royal Engineers until he transferred to the RFC in December 1916. In December 1917 he was posted as a pilot to No. 22 Squadron flying Bristol F.2B fighters. His first air victory, a downed Pfalz D.III, was recorded 16 March 1918, followed by an Albatros D.V two days later.

With three more kills in March Harvey established himself as a flying ace. In May 1918 he was promoted to captain and commanded 'B' Flight. In the last decade of May Harvey, flying with Lt. George Thomson as his flight observer, downed two observation balloons and four German airplanes; on 20 June he downed three enemy airplanes. Shortly after this success Thomson was replaced with Captain Dennis Waight, who remained Harvey's teammate until the end of campaign. The crew scored 9 kills during the Battle of Amiens in August 1918.

Of his twenty-six victories (comprising 3 balloons, 12 and 2 shared destroyed, and 9 'out of control') credited to Harvey, eighteen were achieved utilising his front gun.

== Later military service ==
After the war, Harvey served as an instructor with 33 TD Squadron of the Army of the Rhine. On leaving the RAF he became a farmer. During the Second World War he was awarded the MBE for his service. When the war ended he retired to Kent, writing many aviation-related articles and the history of his old RAF Squadron, No. 22, entitled 'Pi in the Sky'.

Harvey married Mary Gurdon, sister of his squadron mate John Everard Gurdon, in 1920.

== Honours and awards ==
- 3 August 1918 - Distinguished Flying Cross - Lt. William Frederick James Harvey:

"As a fighting pilot this officer has the real offensive spirit regardless of personal danger. He has destroyed several enemy machines whilst fighting against superior numbers."

- 3 December 1918 - Bar to the Distinguished Flying Cross - Lieut. (A./Capt.) William Frederick James Harvey, D.F.C. (FRANCE.)

"A brilliant fighting pilot, who has proved himself a capable leader in many offensive patrols. During the August operations he personally accounted for seven enemy machines and, in company with another pilot, destroyed an eighth, displaying courage and tenacity of high order."

- 10 April 1945 - Member of the Order of the British Empire - Captain (temporary Major) William Frederick James Harvey, D.F.C. (73684), Royal Artillery, Territorial Army.
