= Josiah Lewis Morgan =

Welsh WW1 fighter ace

- Born: 1893; Porth, Glamorgan, Wales
- Died: 11 May 1982 (aged 88–89); Cardiff, Wales
- Military career
- Allegiance: United Kingdom
- Branch: British Army; Royal Air Force
- Rank: Lieutenant
- Units: South Wales Borderers; No. 22 Squadron RAF
- Awards: Military Cross

Lieutenant Josiah Lewis Morgan MC (1893 – 11 May 1982) was a Welsh flying ace in the Royal Air Force. He was credited with 12 official victories during World War I. He served as an observer/gunner for Hiram Frank Davison for all but one of his victories.

== World War I ==
On 13 January 1918, Morgan was transferred from the South Wales Borderers to the Royal Flying Corps; his seniority as a temporary second lieutenant was fixed at 10 October 1917.

Morgan joined No. 22 Squadron on 13 January 1918. He scored his first aerial victory on 6 March 1918, manning the observer's guns and driving down a German Albatros D.V over Douai. Two days later, he and Davison drove down two more Albatros D.Vs, and destroyed a Pfalz D.III. On the 13th, they set a Pfalz D.III afire for their fifth victory in Bristol F.2 Fighter serial number B1152. Morgan next scored on the 18th, while flying in Bristol number C4808, helping William Frederick James Harvey set an Albatros D.V aflame over Carvin. Between 25 and 29 March, Morgan scored his last six wins; one each on the 25th and 26th, and pairs of wins on both 27 and 29 March 1918. He achieved these last half dozen wins in Bristol number A7243 with Davison at the controls. Morgan's final tally was five enemy fighters and a reconnaissance plane destroyed, with an equal slate being driven down out of control. Morgan always modestly claimed that he was personally responsible for only two victories. On 4 April 1918 Morgan was returned to Home Establishment in England to instructor duty at No. 6 School of Aviation for the rest of the war.

== Post World War I ==
On 11 April 1919, Lewis was transferred to the Royal Air Force's unemployed list.

As chairman, Lewis presided over the dissolution of J. P. Morgan Company in Cardiff, Wales, on 29 June 1926.

Josiah Lewis Morgan died in Cardiff, Wales on 11 May 1982.

== Awards and citations ==
Military Cross
Temporary Second Lieutenant Josiah Lewis Morgan, RAF.

"For conspicuous gallantry and devotion to duty when carrying out many low-flying and offensive patrols, and engaging enemy troops, transports, etc., with machine-gun fire, and inflicting heavy casualties. On many occasions he attacked and destroyed, or drove down out of control, hostile machines, and he invariably displayed a dash and determination worthy of the highest praise."
