= Frank George Gibbons =

British WWI pilot

- Born: 13 June 1899; Peterborough, England
- Died: 21 May 1932 (aged 32); Stanton, Suffolk, England
- Military career
- Allegiance: United Kingdom
- Branch: British Army; Royal Air Force
- Service years: 1917–1932
- Rank: Flight lieutenant
- Units: No. 22 Squadron RAF; No. 111 Squadron RAF; No. 208 Squadron RAF; Aden Flight; No. 19 Squadron RAF; No. 204 Squadron RAF
- Conflicts: World War I; Western Front
- Awards: Distinguished Flying Cross

Flight Lieutenant Frank George Gibbons DFC (13 June 1899 – 21 May 1932) was a British First World War flying ace credited with fourteen aerial victories. He served in the Royal Air Force post-war, until killed in a flying accident during an air race.

== World War I service ==
Gibbons joined the Royal Flying Corps as an air mechanic (cadet) in June 1917, and was commissioned as a second lieutenant in November. After completing his flying training Gibbons was posted to No. 22 Squadron RFC to fly the Bristol F.2b two-seater fighter. He was promoted to lieutenant in April 1918, and gained his first aerial victory on 31 May. This was the first in a string of victories that made him an ace by 5 June, gaining the required five victories in less than a week. He gained another victory at the end of June, and single victories in July and August, before scoring another string of six between 2 and 27 September. Such aces as John Jones, John Umney, Ronald Fletcher, Valentine Collins, Christopher Shannon, and James McDonald manned the observer's guns while teamed with Gibbons. In his final tally, he had destroyed six German fighter aircraft and driven eight others down out of control, although his front gun was responsible for only three or four of those. He was appointed a flight commander with the acting-rank of captain on 5 November 1918.

=== List of aerial victories ===
Combat record
No.	Date/Time	Aircraft/ Serial No.	Opponent	Result	Location	Notes
1	31 May 1918 @ 1915	Bristol F.2b (A7243)	Pfalz D.III	Out of control	South-east of Armentières	Observer: Sergeant John Jones
2	1 June 1918 @ 1915	Bristol F.2b (C961)	Pfalz D.III	Destroyed	Erquinghem	Observer: Second Lieutenant John Umney
3	1 June 1918 @ 1915	Bristol F.2b (C961)	Pfalz D.III	Destroyed	Erquinghem	Observer: Second Lieutenant John Umney
4	2 June 1918 @ 1050	Bristol F.2b (C901)	Pfalz D.III	Out of control	North-east of Lens	Observer: Sergeant John Jones
5	5 June 1918 @ 1915	Bristol F.2b (C929)	Pfalz D.III	Out of control	North-east of La Bassée	Observer: Sergeant Ronald Fletcher
6	28 June 1918 @ 1015	Bristol F.2b (C989)	Fokker Dr.I	Destroyed	North of Estaires	Observer: Lieutenant Valentine Collins
7	10 July 1918 @ 0945	Bristol F.2b (C989)	Fokker Dr.I	Out of control	Lille	Observer: Lieutenant Valentine Collins
8	27 August 1918 @ 1345	Bristol F.2b (E2454)	Fokker D.VII	Out of control	Douai	Observer: Lieutenant James McDonald
9	2 September 1918 @ 1115	Bristol F.2b (D7894)	Fokker D.VII	Destroyed	Haynecourt	Observer: Sergeant Christopher Shannon
10	2 September 1918 @ 1115	Bristol F.2b (D7894)	Fokker D.VII	Destroyed	Haynecourt	Observer: Sergeant Christopher Shannon
11	5 September 1918 @ 1700	Bristol F.2b (E2454)	Fokker D.VII	Out of control	Douai	Observer: Sergeant Christopher Shannon
12	16 September 1918 @ 1530	Bristol F.2b (E2454)	Fokker D.VII	Out of control	Quesnoy Wood	Observer: Sergeant Christopher Shannon
13	25 September 1918 @ 1810	Bristol F.2b (E2477)	Fokker D.VII	Destroyed	Bourlon Wood–Cambrai	Observer: Second Lieutenant J. A. Oliver
14	27 September 1918 @ 0730	Bristol F.2b (F6040)	Fokker D.VII	Out of control	Sensée Canal–Cambrai	Observer: Sergeant Christopher Shannon

== Post-war military career ==
Gibbons remained with No. 22 Squadron until returning to England in early 1919 when he was posted to No. 10 Training School, where in recognition of his wartime service he was awarded the Distinguished Flying Cross on 3 June. In July 1919 he was sent to the Middle East to serve in No. 111 Squadron based in Palestine, but was transferred to the unemployed list of the Royal Air Force on 2 March 1920. On 22 April, he was granted Royal Aero Club Aviators' Certificate No. 7860, and on 15 June he rejoined the Royal Air Force when granted a short service commission with the rank of flying officer with effect from 9 June 1920. Later that year he undertook the Instructor's Course at the Central Flying School.

On 7 August 1922, during the Seventh Aerial Derby at Croydon Aerodrome, he took part in an aerial relay race for the Air League Challenge Cup. Gibbons was flying an Avro as part of a three-man team representing RAF Uxbridge against RAF Kenley. Unfortunately his opponents Avro suffered an engine failure at takeoff and had to make a forced landing, writing off his undercarriage and propeller, and so the contest was abandoned.

Gibbons was granted a permanent commission in the RAF on 26 December 1922, and his short service commission was cancelled. On 16 May 1923 he was posted to No. 208 Squadron, then based at Constantinople, Turkey, flying Bristol F.2b fighters. On 14 August he was transferred to the Aden Flight, a detachment from No. 208 Squadron, based at RAF Khormaksar, Aden. On 15 April 1925 he returned to No. 208 Squadron, who were now based at RAF Ismailia, Egypt.

On 1 January 1926 Gibbons was promoted to flight lieutenant, and on 22 January he was transferred to RAF Heliopolis, Egypt. He was eventually transferred back to the Home Establishment, and posted to the RAF Depot at Uxbridge on 4 November 1926. On 16 April 1927 he was assigned to No. 19 Squadron, based at RAF Duxford, flying the Gloster Grebe, and then to the Home Aircraft Depot at RAF Henlow in 30 July, to attend an engineering course. Gibbons was elected to membership of the Royal Aero Club on 14 March 1928. On 1 August 1929 Gibbons was posted to No. 5 Flying Training School at RAF Sealand, serving on the staff for engineering duties. He was then posted to RAF Calshot, the seaplane base on Southampton Water, on 5 January 1931 to complete a course in navigation, before joining No. 204 Squadron, a coastal reconnaissance unit flying Supermarine Southampton flying boats from RAF Mount Batten in Plymouth Sound on 7 July 1931.

== Air racing ==
Aside from his RAF career Gibbons also developed an interest in the popular air races of the day. He competed in the 1930 King's Cup Air Race flying the Cirrus Hermes-engined Simmonds Spartan G-AAMG, but failed to complete the course. He also flew as navigator to Mr. H. T. Andrews, flying a Spartan Arrow in the Circuit of Europe competition in mid-1930.

The following year, on 30 May 1931, he took part in the London to Newcastle Air Race, flying the Hermes II-powered Spartan G-AAHA at an average speed of 118.7 miles per hour (191.0 km/h) and coming in 4th place. The next day he attended the Yorkshire Aeroplane Club's event at Sherburn-in-Elmet, taking part in a 30-mile air race in his Spartan, and coming third. On 25 July 1931 Gibbons took part in the King's Cup Air Race for the second time, again flying Spartan G-AAHA. He led for much of the race, but was finally overtaken in the final leg by Flying Officer E. C. T. Edwards, flying the Blackburn Bluebird IV G-AACC belonging to Robert McAlpine, and came second by only three minutes. On 3 October 1931 he took part in a race between Heston Aerodrome, London, and Cardiff, to mark the opening of the Cardiff Municipal Aerodrome. Gibbons was flying the Gipsy II-engined Spartan Three Seater G-ABTT, and came third, despite carrying Louis Strange and his wife as passengers.

On 21 May 1932 Gibbons was again flying the Three Seater G-ABTT in a race sponsored by The Morning Post, when his aircraft crashed into a tree near Stanton, Suffolk, killing him instantly. It was believed he was looking at a map inside the cockpit at the moment of the accident. The poor flying weather and the format of a point to point to point race would seem contributory factors. Gibbons' funeral took place at Ipswich on 25 May 1931. He was 32 years of age and unmarried.

== Bibliography ==
- Shores, Christopher F.; Franks, Norman & Guest, Russell F. (1990). Above the Trenches: a Complete Record of the Fighter Aces and Units of the British Empire Air Forces 1915–1920. London, UK: Grub Street. ISBN 978-0-948817-19-9.
