= James McDonald (RAF officer) =

British World War I flying ace

- Born: 23 July 1899; Renfrew, Scotland
- Died: Unknown
- Military career
- Allegiance: United Kingdom
- Branch: British Army; Royal Air Force
- Rank: Lieutenant
- Unit: No. 22 Squadron RAF
- Conflicts: World War I; Western Front
- Awards: Distinguished Flying Cross

Lieutenant James McDonald DFC (born 23 July 1899, date of death unknown) was a British World War I flying ace credited with eight aerial victories.

== Military service ==
McDonald served as an observer/gunner in No. 22 Squadron RAF, flying the Bristol F.2b two-seater fighter, and gained his first aerial victory on 31 May 1918 by shooting an Albatros D.V down in flames over Neuve-Chapelle. On 2 June he gained a double victory driving down an Albatros D.V and Albatros C south-east of La Bassée. In these victories he was piloted by Second Lieutenant Leslie Walter King. For his next two, on 3 and 23 June, he was piloted by Lieutenant John Everard Gurdon, driving down a Fokker D.VII east of La Bassée on both occasions. With Captain George William Bulmer he flamed another Albatros C north of Bois-de-Phalempin on 9 July, then with Lieutenant Frank George Gibbons he drove down two more Fokker D.VIIs over Douai on 27 August and 5 September.
