= John Howard Umney =

English flying ace

- Born: 11 April 1898; London, England
- Died: 14 August 1934 (aged 36); Reading, Berkshire, England
- Relatives: Constance Mary (daughter); Edwin John (son); Asher Louise (grand-daughter)
- Military career
- Allegiance: United Kingdom
- Branch: British Army; Royal Air Force
- Service years: 1917–1919
- Rank: Second lieutenant
- Unit: No. 22 Squadron RAF
- Awards: Military Cross

Second Lieutenant John Howard Umney MC (11 April 1898 – 14 August 1934) was an English flying ace from World War I. He flew as a gunner/observer in the rear seat of Bristol F.2B Fighters, and was credited with 13 official aerial victories.

== Early life ==
John Howard Umney was born on 11 April 1898, and raised in Sloane Square, London. He was married and living in Reading, Berkshire when he joined the Royal Flying Corps.

== World War I ==
John Umney joined the Royal Flying Corps as a cadet in late 1917, and on 3 January 1918 was appointed a probationary temporary second lieutenant (observer officer). Posted to No. 22 Squadron RFC, he scored his first victory while piloted by Lieutenant Ernest C. Bromley on 6 May 1918, by which time the RFC had merged with the RNAS to become the Royal Air Force. Umney, Bromley, and Bristol F.2 Fighter serial number C4747 would score four more victories in the next ten days; the destruction of two Pfalz D.IIIs over Douai on the 16th made both men aces. Umney was finally confirmed in his rank on 18 May 1918.

Umney and Bromley would stay teamed for five more wins; Umney also scored twice as a gunner for Lieutenant Frank George Gibbons and another time for Lieutenant O.S. Harris. By 25 August 1918, the date of Umney's final win, he had accounted for four Pfalz D.III's and a German two-seater reconnaissance plane destroyed, as well as eight other enemy aircraft driven down out of control. In September 1918 he was awarded the Military Cross for his gallantry. His citation read:

Second Lieutenant John Howard Umney, General List and Royal Air Force.
For conspicuous gallantry and devotion to duty. During recent operations he destroyed five enemy machines. By his untiring energy and keenness, both in the air and on the ground, he set a splendid example to other observers in the squadron, and greatly helped his pilot in successful encounters.

Umney left the RAF, being transferred to the unemployed list, on 17 January 1919.

== Post World War I ==
John Howard Umney married Maude Louise Webber, and had two children: Constance Mary (b. 6 July 1930) and Edwin John (b. 4 August 1932). John Howard Umney died on 14 August 1934 at 35 Northcourt Avenue, Reading, Berkshire, England. He died intestate; his widow, Maude Louise Umney, administered his estate.
