= Valentine Collins =

British flying ace (1894–1918)

Valentine St. Barbe Collins
- Born: 2 January 1894; Bermuda
- Died: 2 September 1918 (aged 24); France
- Military career
- Allegiance: United Kingdom
- Branch: British Army; Royal Air Force
- Rank: Lieutenant
- Units: No. 45 Squadron and No. 48 Squadron Royal Flying Corps; No. 22 Squadron RAF

Lieutenant Valentine St. Barbe Collins (2 January 1894 – 2 September 1918) was a World War I British flying ace credited with ten aerial victories who served with the Royal Flying Corps and the Royal Air Force.

== Background ==
Valentine St. Barbe Collins, son of Colonel Charles Bury Collins, CMG DSO (RE), and his wife Etheldred St. Barbe Collins, was born on 2 January 1894 in Bermuda. He studied at Wellington College, built as a national monument to the Duke of Wellington, in Crowthorne, Berkshire, England. In June 1916, his father, then a lieutenant colonel, was awarded the Distinguished Service Order; however, he died the following year, on 1 March 1917, at or near Dar es Salaam, East Africa. He was with the Corps of Royal Engineers and part of the East African Expeditionary Force stationed at Quetta in India.

== Military career ==
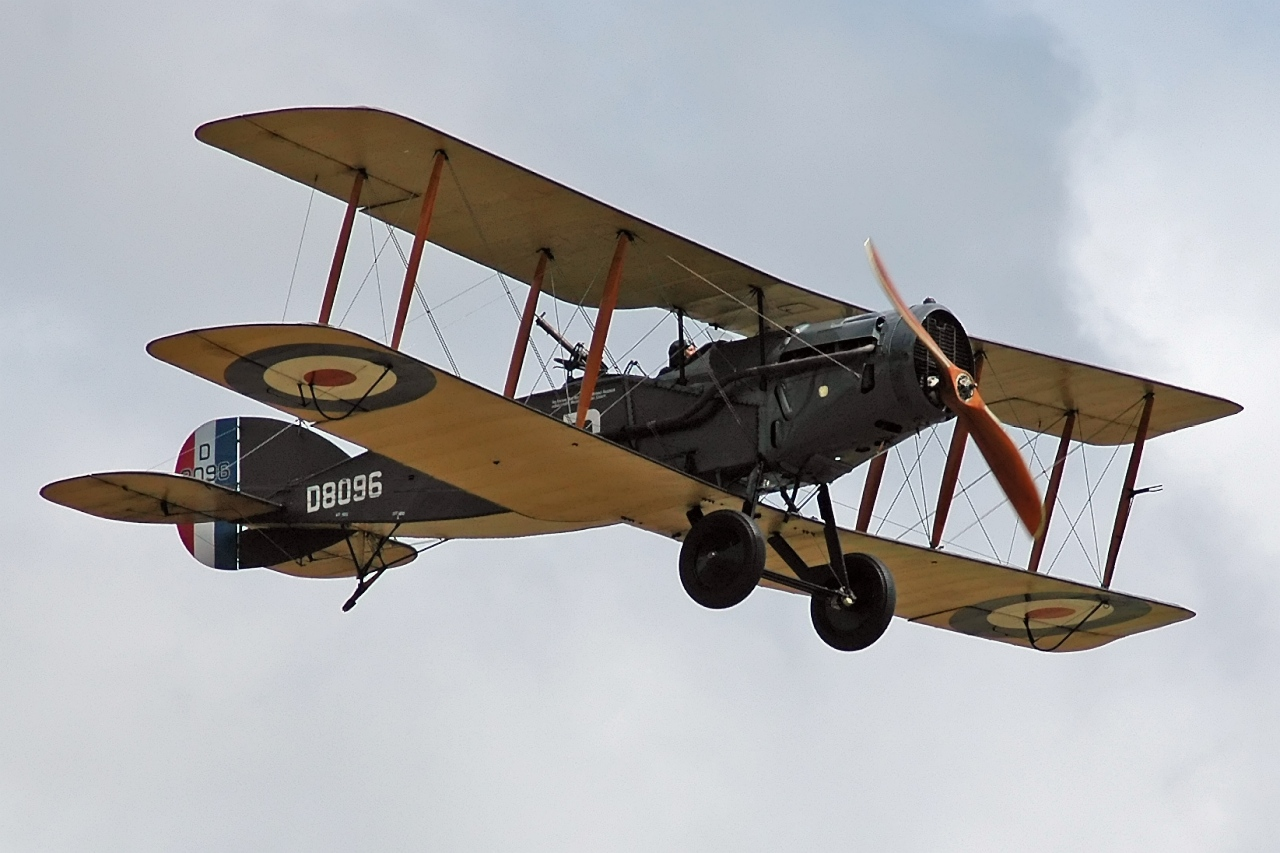
Collins scored all of his victories from a Bristol F.2b, a two-seat biplane

Valentine Collins joined the Royal Flying Corps in October 1916. He served with the RFC Special Reserve. He was posted first to No. 45 Squadron, but was injured on 29 November 1916. In 1917, he served with No. 48 Squadron in France, before his return to France in December 1917. After 1 April 1918 merger of the Royal Flying Corps with the Royal Naval Air Service, he served with No. 22 Squadron of the Royal Air Force. Lieutenant Collins is credited with ten aerial victories, all as an observer. The first three were with No. 48 Squadron of the Royal Flying Corps and the next seven were with No. 22 Squadron of the Royal Air Force. Collins scored all of his victories from a Bristol F.2b, a two-seat biplane fighter and reconnaissance aircraft, also known as a Bristol Fighter.

Each of his first three scores was against an Albatros D.V, from his Bristol F.2b piloted by Australian Second Lieutenant William Dowling Bostock. Pilot Bostock went on to become Air Vice Marshal, a senior commander in the Royal Australian Air Force, by the onset of World War II. Collins' first victory occurred on 4 September 1917 from his Bristol F.2b with serial number A7224, piloted by Bostock. His opponent's aircraft was sent out of control over Middelkerke and Ostend, both in West Flanders, Belgium. On 27 September 1917, Collins scored a double victory over Pervijze, West Flanders, again in a Bristol Fighter piloted by Bostock. One opponent's Albatros D.V was destroyed, and 15 minutes later another's was sent out of control.

Collins did not have another kill until June of the next year, as a member of No. 22 Squadron of the Royal Air Force. On 28 June 1918, his Bristol F.2b (C989) piloted by Lieutenant Frank George Gibbons, a flying ace credited with 14 aerial victories, destroyed a Fokker Dr.I, a single-seat triplane fighter, north of Estaires, Nord, France. The following month, on 10 July 1918, the same Bristol Fighter piloted by Gibbons sent another Fokker Dr.I out of control over Lille, Nord, France.

All of the aviator's remaining five victories were in aircraft piloted by Lieutenant Leslie Walter King, a flying ace credited with nine aerial victories. On 8 August 1918, Collins scored his sixth victory, from Bristol F.2b (D7894) piloted by King, when a Pfalz D.III was sent out of control south of Douai, Nord, France. Two days later, from the same Bristol Fighter piloted by King, Collins destroyed two Fokker D.VII aircraft southwest of Péronne, France. On 21 August 1918, Collins scored his ninth victory over Albert and Cambrai, Nord, France. His Bristol F.2b (E2454) piloted again by King sent a Fokker D.VII out of control. His tenth and last victory occurred on 27 August 1918. His Bristol F.2b piloted by Lieutenant King defeated a Fokker D.VII which was sent out of control over Senlemont.

== Death ==
Lieutenant Valentine St. Barbe Collins was killed in action at age 24 on 2 September 1918 in France. He is commemorated on the Arras Flying Services Memorial at the Faubourg d'Amiens Cemetery on the Boulevard du General de Gaulle in Arras, Pas-de-Calais, France. Killed with him was Captain Brian Laidley Dowling from Sydney, Australia, who was piloting D7790. He is commemorated on the same memorial.

== Gallery of aeroplanes downed ==
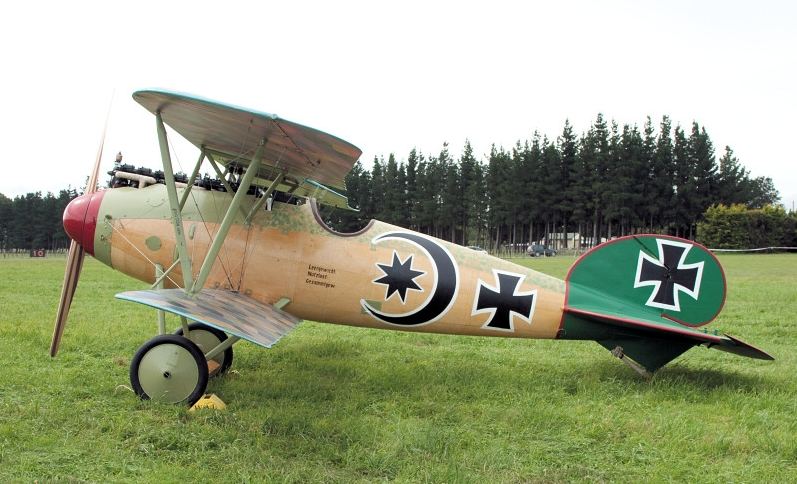
Albatros D.V
Victories 1–3

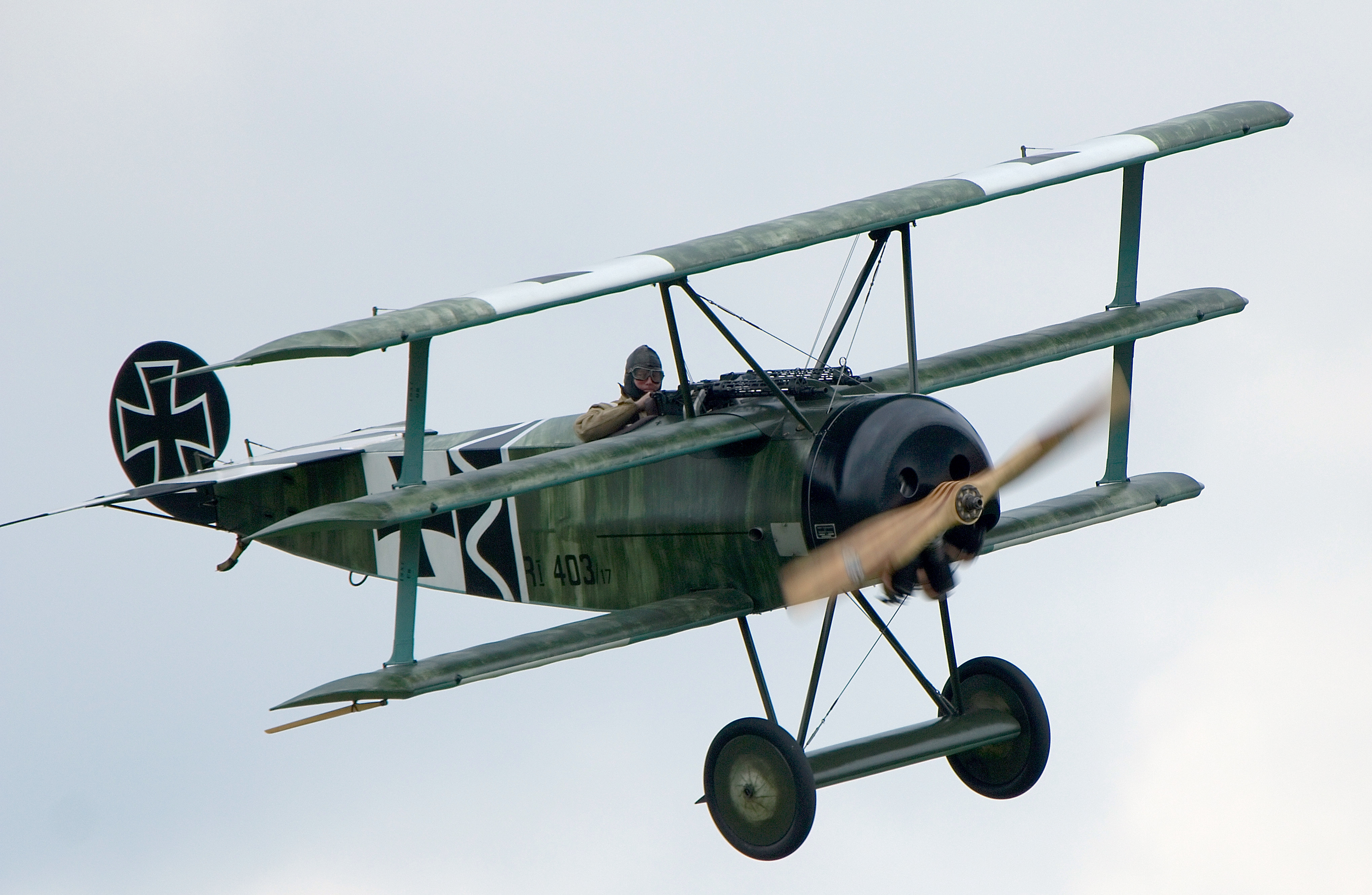
Fokker Dr.I
Victories 4,5

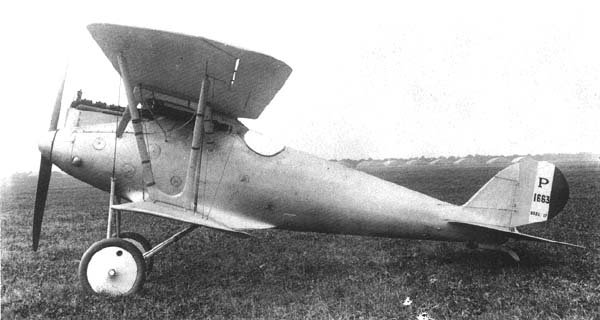
Pfalz D.III
Victory 6

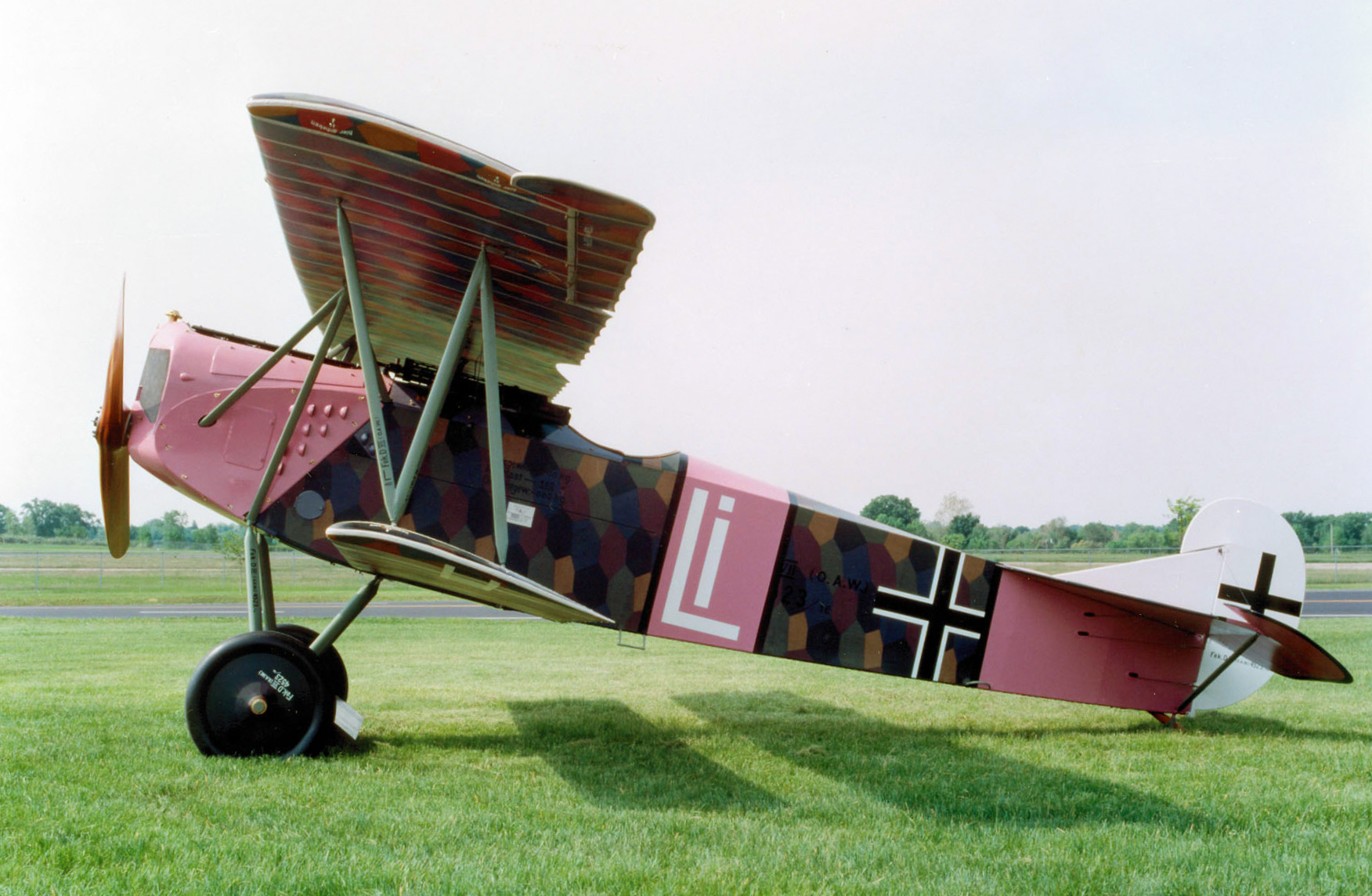
Fokker D.VII
Victories 7–10
