= Hiram Franklin Davison =

Canadian flying ace

- Born: January 12, 1894; Bastard and Burgess, Canada
- Died: January 1974; London, Ontario, Canada
- Military career
- Allegiance: George V of the British Empire
- Branch: Canadian Expeditionary Force; Royal Flying Corps
- Rank: Lieutenant
- Unit: No. 22 Squadron RAF
- Awards: Military Cross

Lieutenant Hiram Franklin Davison MC (sometimes mistakenly deemed Hiram Frank Davison) was a Canadian-born World War I flying ace credited with 11 official aerial victories in only 39 days.

== World War I ==
=== Enlistment ===
When Davison enlisted in the Canadian Expeditionary Force on 7 January 1916, he gave his profession as traveling salesman and his next of kin as his mother, Etta Davison, residing in Forfar. His father was R. J. Davison. Hiram Franklin Davison's physical examination measured him as five feet nine and a half inches tall; he was described as being of medium complexion, with blue-grey eyes and brown hair.

=== Aerial service ===
Davison was a Bristol F.2 Fighter pilot assigned to 22 Squadron when he scored his first aerial victory on 6 March 1918. With observer/gunner Josiah Lewis Morgan manning the guns in the rear seat of the two-seated fighter, Davison drove a German Albatros D.V down out of control over Douai. Morgan and Davison would remain teamed for ten more victories. The next three came on 8 March, with two more Albatros D.Vs driven out of control and a Pfalz D.III destroyed. On 13 March 1918, they set a Pfalz D.III afire over Annoeullin. From 25 through 29 March, they downed six more enemy planes. Davison's final tally was five enemy planes destroyed, and six driven down out of control.

Davison was wounded in action on 13 April 1918.

On 29 August 1919, Davison was invalided out of the Royal Air Force.

== Honors and awards ==
T./2nd Lt. Hiram Franklin Davison, R.F.C. For conspicuous gallantry and devotion to duty. During four days' operations, he destroyed two enemy aeroplanes and drove down two out of control, while his observer destroyed one and drove down another out of control. He also assisted other members of his squadron in destroying enemy machines. He showed splendid courage and leadership, and set an excellent example to his comrades.
