= George William Bulmer =

- Born: 1 September 1898; Dixon, Illinois, US
- Died: 5 April 1987 (aged 88); San Diego, California, US
- Military career
- Allegiance: Canadian
- Branch: Royal Flying Corps
- Rank: Captain
- Unit: No. 22 Squadron RAF
- Awards: Military Cross, Distinguished Flying Cross

Captain George William Bulmer (1 September 1898 – 5 April 1987) was an American-born Canadian flying ace in World War I. He was credited with nine aerial victories.

== Early life ==
George William Bulmer was born in Dixon, Illinois, US, on 1 September 1898. His parents were British. He worked as an accountant before enlisting in the Royal Air Force in Toronto, Canada, in 1917.

== World War I ==
By early 1918, Bulmer had completed training and been posted to 22 Squadron. He scored his first aerial victory on 6 March 1918, and continued to win through 9 July 1918. His exploits earned him a Military Cross, which was gazetted on 16 September 1918:

....In recent operations he destroyed seven enemy machines and an observation balloon. By his tenacity and zeal he set a magnificent example in his squadron.

== List of aerial victories ==
No.	Date/time	Aircraft	Foe	Result	Location	Notes
1	6 March 1918 @ 1115 hours	Bristol F.2 Fighter serial number C4810	Pfalz D.III	Driven down out of control	East of La Bassée	Gunner: 2 Lt S J Hunter
2	16 March 1918 @ 1030 hours	Bristol F.2 Fighter s/n C4810	Pfalz D.III	Driven down out of control	Henin-Lietard	Gunner: 2 Lt Percy Stanley Williams
3	16 March 1918 @ 1030 hours	Bristol F.2 Fighter s/n C4810	Pfalz D.III	Driven down out of control	Henin Lietard	Gunner: 2 Lt Percy Stanley Williams
4	23 March 1918 @ 1100 hours	Bristol F.2 Fighter s/n A7251	Albatros D.V	Destroyed	Bussy	Gunner: 2 Lt Percy Stanley Williams
5	6 May 1918 @ 1025 hours	Bristol F.2 Fighter s/n C4888	Pfalz D.III	Driven down out of control	Fresnoy	Gunner: Lt H E Elsworth
6	8 May 1918 @ 1015 hours	Bristol F.2 Fighter s/n C4888	Pfalz D.III	Destroyed	Brebieres	Gunner: 2 Lt Percy Stanley Williams
7	16 May 1918 @ 1045 hours	Bristol F.2 Fighter s/n C4888	Observation balloon	Destroyed	A mile northeast of Neuf-Berquin	Gunner: 2 Lt Percy Stanley Williams
8	17 May 1918 @ 1200 hours	Bristol F.2 Fighter s/n C4888	German reconnaissance plane	Destroyed	Southeast of Douai	Gunner: 2 Lt Percy Stanley Williams
9	9 July 1918 @ 1100 hours	Bristol F.2 Fighter s/n C4888	German reconnaissance plane	Set afire; destroyed	North of Bois-de-Phalempin	Gunner: James McDonald

== Post World War I ==
There is no reliable account of his later years, although it is known that he died in San Diego, California, US, on 5 April 1987.
