= John Jones (RAF airman) =

- Born: Unknown
- Died: Unknown
- Military career
- Allegiance: United Kingdom
- Branch: British Army; Royal Air Force
- Rank: Sergeant
- Unit: No. 22 Squadron RFC/No. 22 Squadron RAF
- Awards: Distinguished Flying Medal

Sergeant John Jones DFM was a World War I flying ace credited with 15 aerial victories.

John Jones served as an observer/gunner in the Bristol F.2 Fighters of No. 22 Squadron. Flying with such pilots as Second Lieutenants Frank George Gibbons, Sydney A. Oades, Stanley Wallage, Frank George Gibbons, and Captain William John Mostyn, Jones began his victory streak on 5 December 1917. Six months later, on 2 June 1918, he had run his total to four enemy aircraft and an observation balloon destroyed, and ten aircraft driven down out of control.
