= Ronald Malcolm Fletcher =

English WWI ace (1899–1952)

- Born: 22 February 1899; Ranskill, Nottinghamshire, England
- Died: 20 January 1952 (aged 52); Dore, Sheffield, West Riding of Yorkshire, England
- Military career
- Allegiance: United Kingdom
- Branch: British Army; Royal Air Force
- Service years: 1917–1919
- Rank: Second Lieutenant
- Units: 30th Training Reserve Battalion; No. 22 Squadron RAF
- Conflicts: World War I World War II
- Awards: Distinguished Flying Medal

Ronald Malcolm Fletcher DFM (22 February 1899 – 20 January 1952) was an English World War I observer/gunner ace in two-seater fighters who, in conjunction with his pilot, Lt. Samuel F.H. Thompson, gained 26 confirmed victories (16 destroyed, 10 'out of control'). He was notable for the fact that all but one of these victories were over enemy fighter aircraft.

== Early life and background ==
Fletcher was born in Ranskill, Nottinghamshire, the son of George Harrison Fletcher (1862–1924) and his second wife Ethel Sleath (1864–1941).

== Military service ==
Attached to the Royal Flying Corps from the 30th Training Reserve Battalion in November 1917, Fletcher was teamed with pilot Samuel Frederick Henry Thompson in May 1918. Thompson already had scored three victories. The team of Sergeant Fletcher and Lieutenant Thompson was to become a deadly one; Fletcher scored all but one of his 26 victories flying in the rear seat of Bristol F.2bs flown by Thompson. In turn, Thompson would become the leading ace of 22 Squadron with 30 victories.

The new team got off to an immediate success; on 16 May 1918, they destroyed three German Pfalz D.III fighters in ten minutes. Five days later, they destroyed another Pfalz and drove one down out of control, and Fletcher was an ace. Fletcher got two more wins in May, over German Albatros D.Vs. June then became a succession of multiple victory days—two each on the 1st and 2nd, three on the 5th, and two more on the 23rd, to end the month with a count of 16 wins.

There was a lapse in his tally until 8 August, when he shot down a Fokker Dr.I. He then tripled on the 13th and doubled on the 27th. His final four victories came in September, including yet another double on the 5th.

The final list of 26 victories with Thompson over German fighters was an impressive one. Three were shot down in flames; an Albatros D.V, a Pfalz D.III, and a Fokker D.VII. Thirteen others were claimed destroyed; four Pfalz D.IIIs, five Albatros D.Vs, two Fokker Dr.Is, and two Fokker D.VIIs. All other victories were classified as "driven down out of control".

The Thompson/Fletcher team thus destroyed the equivalent of more than an entire German fighter squadron. Research suggests Thompson claimed at least 18 of their 26 victories with his front gun, and Fletcher's personal score (taking into account claims with other pilots) was at least 11.

Fletcher was commissioned as a temporary second lieutenant (observer officer) on 8 October 1918.

He was awarded the Distinguished Flying Medal, which was gazetted on 2 November 1918. His citation read:

P22398 Serjt. Ronald Malcolm Fletcher (attached from Training Res. Bn.).

A most efficient and keen observer, in whom his pilots place implicit confidence. He has taken part in numerous combats with enemy aircraft, and invariably displays marked fearlessness and skill. He has personally accounted for seven enemy machines since 21 May.

Fletcher finally left the RAF, being transferred to the unemployed list, on 28 February 1919.

== Post World War I ==
Fletcher married Elsie Annie Newborn on 23 April 1924 in the Wesleyan Methodist church in Priory Place, Doncaster, England.

He returned to service during World War II, being commissioned as a probationary acting pilot officer, for the duration of hostilities, on 30 March 1941, in the RAF Volunteer Reserve, and served in the Air Training Corps. Fletcher died in Dore, Sheffield, West Riding of Yorkshire, England on 20 January 1952.

== Bibliography ==
- Franks, Norman; Guest, Russell F. & Alegi, Gregory (1997). Above the War Fronts: The British Two-seater Bomber Pilot and Observer Aces, the British Two-seater Fighter Observer Aces, and the Belgian, Italian, Austro-Hungarian and Russian Fighter Aces, 1914–1918. London, UK: Grub Street. ISBN 978-1-898697-56-5.
- Shores, Christopher F.; Franks, Norman & Guest, Russell F. (1990). Above the Trenches: a Complete Record of the Fighter Aces and Units of the British Empire Air Forces 1915-1920. London, UK: Grub Street. ISBN 978-0-948817-19-9.
- Guttman, Jon (2007). Bristol F2 Fighter Aces of World War I. Osprey Publishing. ISBN 978-1-84603-201-1.
