= Wallage =

Wallage is a surname. Notable people with the surname include:

- Jacques Wallage (1946–2026), Dutch politician and sociologist
- Stanley Wallage (1895–1926), British flying ace

== See also ==
- Wallace (surname)
