= Alfred Atkey =

Canadian World War I flying ace

- Born: 16 August 1894; Toronto, Ontario, Canada
- Died: 14 February 1971 (aged 76); Toronto, Ontario, Canada
- Burial place: Springcreek Cemetery, Mississauga; 43°31′21″N 79°38′06″W
- Military career
- Allegiance: United Kingdom
- Branch: British Army; Royal Flying Corps
- Service years: c.1914–1919
- Rank: Captain
- Units: 2/24th Battalion, London Regiment; No. 18 Squadron RFC/RAF; No. 22 Squadron RAF
- Conflicts: World War I; Western Front
- Awards: Military Cross & Bar

Alfred Clayburn Atkey, MC & Bar (16 August 1894 – 14 February 1971) was a Canadian First World War flying ace, officially credited with 38 aerial victories, making him the fifth highest scoring Canadian ace. However, all those above him flew in single-seat fighters, whereas Atkey gained all his victories in heavier two-seater aircraft, becoming the highest scoring two-seater pilot of the war.

== Early life and family background ==
Atkey was born in Toronto, Ontario, on 16 August 1894, the second of five children born to Alfred Atkey, a builder and farmer, and his wife Annie Evelyn (née Shaw). His grandfather, also Alfred, was born in Newport, Isle of Wight, in 1848, and had emigrated to Canada with his parents in the 1850s. In 1906, his family moved west to Nunebor, Saskatchewan. Atkey later returned to Toronto to work for the Toronto Evening Telegram as a journalist.

== Military service ==
Atkey enlisted into the British Army, joining the 2/24th Battalion, London Regiment, a Territorial Force unit that was stationed in England until sent to France in June 1916. On 19 October Atkey was commissioned as a second lieutenant (on probation) in the Royal Flying Corps, and was confirmed in his rank in September 1917. He was then posted to No. 18 Squadron to fly the Airco DH.4 day bomber. He and his gunners claimed nine victories between 4 February and 21 April 1918. He was then transferred to No. 22 Squadron to fly the Bristol F.2b fighter/reconnaissance aircraft in "A" Flight, paired with Lieutenant Charles George Gass as his gunner/observer. On 7 May Atkey and Gass took part in an historic dogfight north-east of Arras, known as the "Two Against Twenty", when Atkey and Gass, with John Gurdon and Anthony Thornton, fought twenty German scout aircraft. Atkey and Gass shot down five enemy aircraft while Gurdon and Thornton accounted for three. Two days later, Atkey and Gass again shot down five enemy aircraft in a single day. The next day, 10 May, Atkey was appointed a flight commander with the acting rank of captain. Atkey claimed a further 19 aircraft between 15 May and 2 June, and was then posted back to the Home Establishment in England.

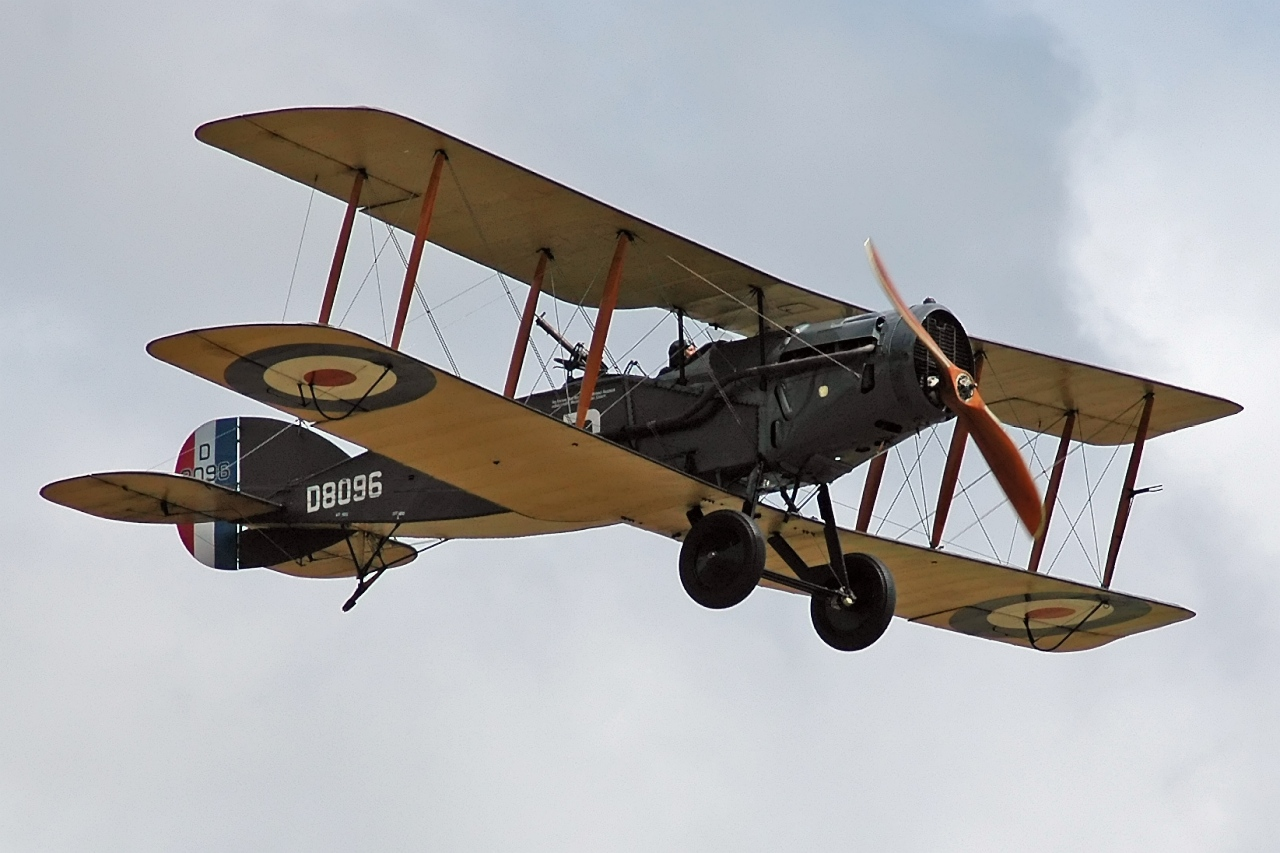
Bristol F.2b Fighter

Atkey was subsequently awarded the Military Cross and a Bar to the award. The first was gazetted on 22 June 1918. His citation read:

Second Lieutenant Alfred Clayburn Atkey, RFC, Special Reserve.
For conspicuous gallantry and devotion to duty. When engaged on reconnaissance and bombing work, he attacked four scouts, one of which he shot down in flames. Shortly afterwards he attacked four two-seater planes, one of which he brought down out of control. On two previous occasions his formation was attacked by superior numbers of the enemy, three of whom in all were shot down out of control. He has shown exceptional ability and initiative on all occasions.

The Bar was gazetted on 13 September 1918, reading:

Lieutenant (Temporary Captain) Alfred Clayburn Atkey, MC, RAF.
For conspicuous gallantry and devotion to duty. During recent operations he destroyed seven enemy machines. When engaged with enemy aircraft, often far superior in numbers, he proved himself a brilliant fighting pilot, and displayed dash and gallantry of a high order.

Atkey was transferred to the Royal Air Force unemployed list on 3 May 1919.

== Post-war life ==
In March 1919, Atkey married Irene E. Marshall (b. 1900 in London, England) in Portsmouth, Hampshire. They moved to the United States, and in 1920 were resident in Brooklyn, New York.

On 23 January 1924, Atkey was living in Los Angeles, employed as a writer, when he filed a "Declaration of Intention", the first step in becoming a naturalized American citizen. In the declaration he stated that he had arrived in Seattle from Vancouver aboard the SS Princess Victoria in November 1923, and had previously resided at North Battleford, Canada, and that his wife was currently living in Edmonton, Alberta, Canada.

It is unclear if Atkey actually became an American citizen, but on 26 August 1942 he was married for a second time to Dulcie May Boadway (b. circa 1914) in Toronto, Ontario. They had four children, Alfred (b. 1943), Donna (b. 1945), George (b. 1951) and Susan (b. 1953).

Atkey died in Toronto, on 10 February 1971, and is buried in Springcreek Cemetery, Mississauga, Ontario. His gravestone describes him as a flying officer in the Royal Canadian Air Force, though details of his later military service are unknown.
