= Edwin Claude Bromley =

- Born: 18 August 1888; Winnipeg, Manitoba, Canada
- Died: 14 April 1928 (aged 39); Calgary, Alberta, Canada
- Burial place: Burnsland Cemetery, Calgary, Alberta, Canada
- Military career
- Allegiance: Canada; United Kingdom (Note: Canadian airmen were required to complete an Attestation Paper in which they declared an oath of allegiance to King George V and agreed to serve in any arm of the service for the duration of the war between Great Britain and Germany.)
- Branch: Canadian Expeditionary Force; Royal Flying Corps
- Service years: 1915–1919
- Rank: Lieutenant
- Unit: No. 22 Squadron RFC/RAF
- Conflicts: World War I; Western Front
- Awards: Military Cross

Lieutenant Edwin Claude Bromley (18 August 1888 – 14 April 1928) was a Canadian World War I flying ace credited with twelve aerial victories. Bromley piloted a two-seater Bristol F.2b Fighter for No. 22 Squadron. The observers that manned the rear guns for Bromley were John Howard Umney, for ten victories, and Charles George Gass, for two.

== World War I ==
Bromley enlisted in the Canadian Expeditionary Force while in Montreal on 17 September 1915. His enlistment papers denote his father, living in Vancouver, as his next of kin. He was five feet seven inches tall, with dark hair and complexion, and gray eyes. He joined the 4th Overseas University Company. His first overseas assignment was as a sapper in the Canadian engineers.

Bromley joined the Royal Flying Corps as a cadet, and was commissioned as a temporary second lieutenant (on probation) on 17 May 1917. He flew solo on 16 July 1917, and was confirmed in his rank and appointed a flying officer on 16 October.

He was subsequently assigned to No. 22 Squadron RFC. On 8 November 1917, he and his observer were badly shot about in a dogfight and forced to land. Bromley's first success in aerial warfare took place on 6 May 1918, when he drove a German Albatros D.III down out of control. He ran off a string of a dozen victories in little less than a month, with his last wins coming on 5 June. His final total included five enemy planes destroyed, and seven driven down out of control.

Bromley was transferred to the unemployed list on 20 May 1919.

== Post-war life ==
Bromley returned to North America aboard the SS Scandinavian, disembarking in New York on 20 July 1919. After family visits, he returned to employment managing the Simmons mattress factory in Calgary. He married his fiancée, Elizabeth Ayling, in October 1920. They had a daughter together three years later.

In April 1928, Bromley went missing for two weeks. His body was eventually found on the Simmons factory roof in a crouched position. The cause of death was unknown. His death date was determined to be 14 April 1928. Edwin Claude Bromley was buried in Burnsland Cemetery in Calgary.

== Bibliography ==
- Guttman, Jon (2007). Bristol F 2 Fighter Aces of World War I. Oxford, UK: Osprey Publishing. ISBN 978-1-84603-201-1.
- Shores, Christopher F.; Franks, Norman & Guest, Russell F. (1990). Above the Trenches: a Complete Record of the Fighter Aces and Units of the British Empire Air Forces 1915–1920. London, UK: Grub Street. ISBN 978-0-948817-19-9.
