= Samuel Frederick Henry Thompson =

British World War I flying ace (1890–1918)

- Born: 30 August 1890; Bow, London, United Kingdom
- Died: 27 September 1918 (aged 28); Near Cambrai, France
- Burial place: Arras Flying Services Memorial
- Military career
- Allegiance: United Kingdom
- Branch: British Army; Royal Air Force
- Service years: 1915–1918
- Rank: Captain
- Nickname: Siffy
- Units: Army Service Corps; No. 20 Squadron RFC; No. 22 Squadron RFC/RAF
- Conflicts: World War I • Western Front
- Awards: Military Cross; Distinguished Flying Cross

Captain Samuel Frederick Henry "Siffy" Thompson MC, DFC (30 August 1890 – 27 September 1918) was a British World War I two-seater fighter ace who, in conjunction with his observer-gunners, was credited with thirty aerial victories (18 destroyed, 12 'out of control') before being shot down and killed. Despite having an active fighter career of only five months, he reached the rank of captain and was awarded two British military decorations.

== Early life ==
Thompson was born to Samuel Whitell Thompson, a medical practitioner, and his wife Florence Augusta Jane (née Evans) in Bow, London in 1890. In the 1911 census the family were resident in Blackheath, and the 20-year-old Thompson was studying to become a civil engineer.

== Military service ==
Thompson was commissioned as a temporary second lieutenant in the Army Service Corps on 22 March 1915, and was promoted to lieutenant on 25 August 1915.

On 7 June 1917 Thompson was transferred to the General List to serve in the Royal Flying Corps, and appointed a flying officer. After joining No. 20 Squadron in late 1917, Thompson's career started somewhat awkwardly, as he crashed his aircraft on 27 October, after which he was transferred to No. 22 Squadron.

Flying the Bristol F.2b, he scored his first victory, an Albatros D.V, east of Merville, France on 22 April 1918. An extremely aggressive pilot, in May 1918 he scored nine victories, including three Pfalz D.III aircraft around 10 a.m. on 16 May, near Douai. Also notable was his downing of two more D.IIIs on 21 May, south-west of Vitry-en-Artois. June 1918 was also fruitful for Thompson, as he scored eight victories mostly in the aircraft C929 (a Bristol F.2b). At Erquinghem-le-Sec on 1 June, he downed an Albatros C.III in addition to an Albatros D.V, and the next day (2 June) he got another two victories near Lens, Pas-de-Calais, this time two Pfalz D.IIIs. He scored only one victory in July, a Fokker Dr.I near Laventie on 26 July. In August he scored a further six victories at Dechy, the road connecting Arras and Cambrai, Douai and Senlemont. He shot down, amongst others, three Fokker D.VII aircraft. He was appointed a flight commander with the temporary rank of captain on 24 August 1918. September started off well for Thompson, with four victories against Fokker D.VIIs up until 24 September. He was awarded the Military Cross on 16 September.

On 27 September 1918, in aircraft E2243, he downed a Halberstadt C north of Noyelles, before being shot down east of Cambrai by Oberleutnant Otto Schmidt of Jasta 5. Thompson was posthumously awarded the Distinguished Flying Cross on 2 November. Having no known grave, he is commemorated on the Arras Flying Services Memorial.

== Observers ==
Thompson claimed at least 18 of his victories with the front gun, the rest being claimed by his gunners. He flew with Lieutenant Charles George Gass, the highest-scoring observer ace during the war, for two of his victories, on 22 April and 26 July 1918, as well as with Sergeant L. Kendrick for two victories in May 1918. The observer on his final flight was Second Lieutenant Clifford Tolman, an 'ace' with 8 victories, who was also killed in the crash.

However, for most of his time of service he flew with Observer Sergeant Ronald Malcolm Fletcher DFM, who recorded 26 victories during the war, and was crewed with Thompson on no fewer than 25 of the pilot's 30 victories, claiming at least six victories in his own right.

== Awards and citations ==
Military Cross
Temporary Lieutenant Samuel Frederick Henry Thompson, General List, Royal Air Force.

"For conspicuous gallantry and devotion to duty as a fighting pilot. During recent operations he destroyed five enemy machines. He showed great courage and skill, and by his keenness and dash set a fine example to all.

Distinguished Flying Cross
Lieutenant (Temporary Captain) Samuel Frederick Henry Thompson, MC.

"This officer has carried out numerous offensive patrols, displaying the most marked bravery and determination. His boldness in attack and utter disregard of personal danger affords a most inspiring example to his brother pilots. Since June last he has destroyed eleven enemy aeroplanes."

== See also ==
- Lists of World War I flying aces
