= Arras Flying Services Memorial =

World War I memorial located in Pas-de-Calais, in France

- Commonwealth War Graves Commission
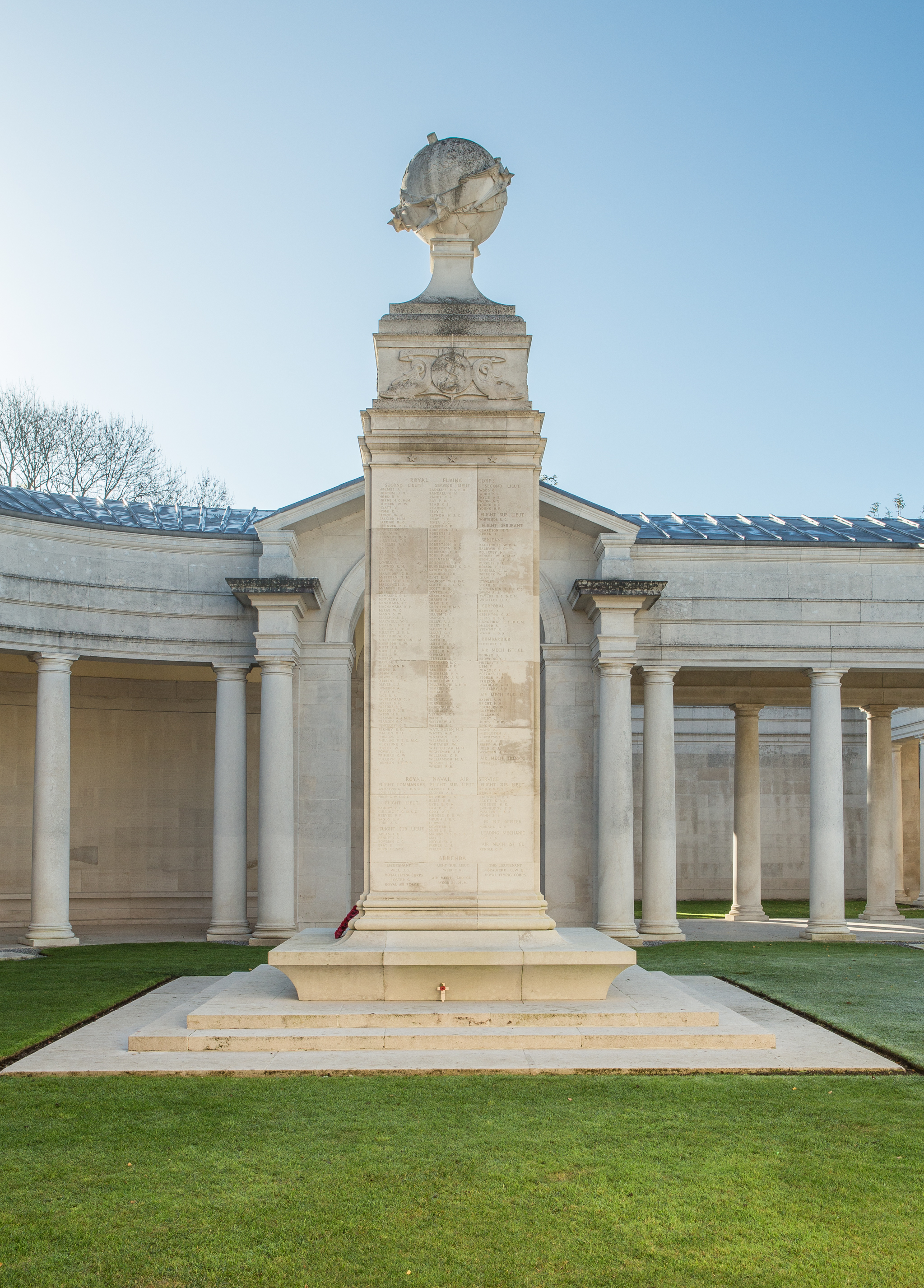
- Arras Flying Services Memorial in the Faubourg d'Amiens Cemetery
- For Royal Naval Air Service, the Royal Flying Corps, and the Royal Air Force who were killed on the whole Western Front and who have no known grave.
- Unveiled: 31 July 1932
- Location: 50°17′12″N 2°45′38″E near Arras, France
- Designed by: Edwin Lutyens
- Commemorated: 990

UNESCO World Heritage Site
- Official name: Funerary and memory sites of the First World War (Western Front)
- Type: Cultural
- Criteria: i, ii, vi
- Designated: 2023 (45th session)
- Reference no.: 1567-PC11

The Arras Flying Services Memorial Commonwealth War Graves Commission memorial in the Faubourg d'Amiens Cemetery, Arras, France. The memorial commemorates nearly 1,000 airmen from forces of the Commonwealth who were killed on the Western Front during World War I and who have no known grave. The memorial was designed by Edwin Lutyens, sculpted by William Reid Dick and unveiled by Hugh Trenchard, 1st Viscount Trenchard, Marshal of the Royal Air Force on 31 July 1932.

== Background ==
In the spring of 1916, French troops transferred the city of Arras in Pas-de-Calais, France, to the British armed forces. Construction of the British portion of Faubourg d'Amiens Cemetery in the western portion of Arras, near the Citadel designed by Vauban, began in March 1916, behind the existing French graveyard. After the Armistice, the cemetery was extended with graves that were transferred from the battlefield and from two smaller graveyards in the area. The graves in the French portion of the military cemetery were moved elsewhere after the war. The vacant land was then designated for two monuments, the Arras Memorial and the Arras Flying Services Memorial. The Faubourg d'Amiens Cemetery comprises 2,650 graves of the First World War, including 10 unidentified burials. In addition to 8 WWII burials from the United Kingdom and United States, there are 30 graves of other nationalities. The Arras Memorial commemorates nearly 35,000 servicemen from the United Kingdom, South Africa, and New Zealand who died between the spring of 1916 and 7 August 1918 (the eve of the Advance to Victory) in the Arras region and who have no known grave. (Missing Canadian and Australian servicemen are commemorated elsewhere.) The Arras Flying Services Memorial commemorates nearly 1,000 members of the Royal Naval Air Service, the Royal Flying Corps, and the Royal Air Force who were killed on the Western Front and who have no known grave.

== Design ==
Architect Sir Edwin Lutyens (1869–1944), of the Imperial War Graves Commission, designed the layout of the Faubourg-d'Amiens Cemetery. He also designed the Arras Memorial and the Arras Flying Services Memorial. The cemetery was planned and constructed before the two monuments were designed. As a result, the paths of the cemetery do not align with the Arras Memorial. The Flying Services Memorial is adjacent to the Arras Memorial. It is an obelisk with a globe which forms a finial on the top. The four sides of the obelisk are inscribed with the names of 990 airmen who were killed on the Western Front and have no known grave. Renowned Scottish sculptor Sir William Reid Dick (1879–1961) sculpted the globe with stars on top of the Arras Flying Services Memorial, as well as the badges on the monument. The globe measures four-foot six inches in diameter, weighing almost three tons. At the 1932 unveiling ceremony, it was revealed that the position of the globe on the obelisk parallels that of the Earth on the morning of the Armistice, 11 November 1918. The badges created by the Scottish sculptor are of the Royal Naval Air Service, the Royal Flying Corps, and the Royal Air Force, as well as the combined badges of Canada, Australia, New Zealand, and South Africa.

== Unveiling ceremony ==
Lord Trenchard performed the unveiling of the Arras Flying Services Memorial and the Arras Memorial on 31 July 1932. The unveiling had initially been scheduled for 15 May 1932; however, due to the assassination of French President Paul Doumer in early May, the ceremony had been postponed. During the first ceremony of the day, Lord Trenchard, accompanied by Lady Trenchard and their eleven-year-old son Hugh Trenchard, was received by the mayor and town council and placed a wreath on the local war memorial. The second ceremony took place in the apse of the cloister of the Arras Memorial, close to the obelisk. Royal Air Force bands played O God, Our Help in Ages Past. After prayers led by the chaplain, Major General Sir Fabian Ware, founder of the Imperial War Graves Commission, addressed Lord Trenchard and invited him to unveil the memorial. Trenchard gave a speech, and then proceeded with the unveiling. The chaplain dedicated the memorials and a hymn was sung. Five aeroplanes flew in a wide arc around the cemetery, and then in V formation shot over the monuments. After the benediction and prayers by Monseigneur Henri-Édouard Dutoit, Bishop of Arras, buglers of the 1st Battalion of the Durham Light Infantry sounded Last Post. Subsequently, pipers of the 1st Battalion of the Seaforth Highlanders played The Flowers of the Forest, followed by the buglers again with Reveille. After the national anthems of France and Britain, there was a procession of those bearing floral tributes, and the ceremony concluded.

== Notable airmen commemorated on the memorial ==
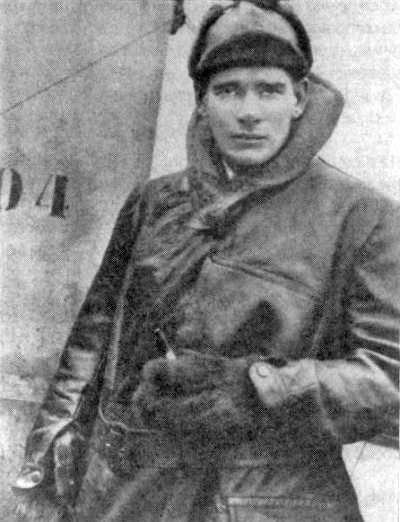
Flying ace "Mick" Mannock was killed in July 1918 and later awarded the Victoria Cross

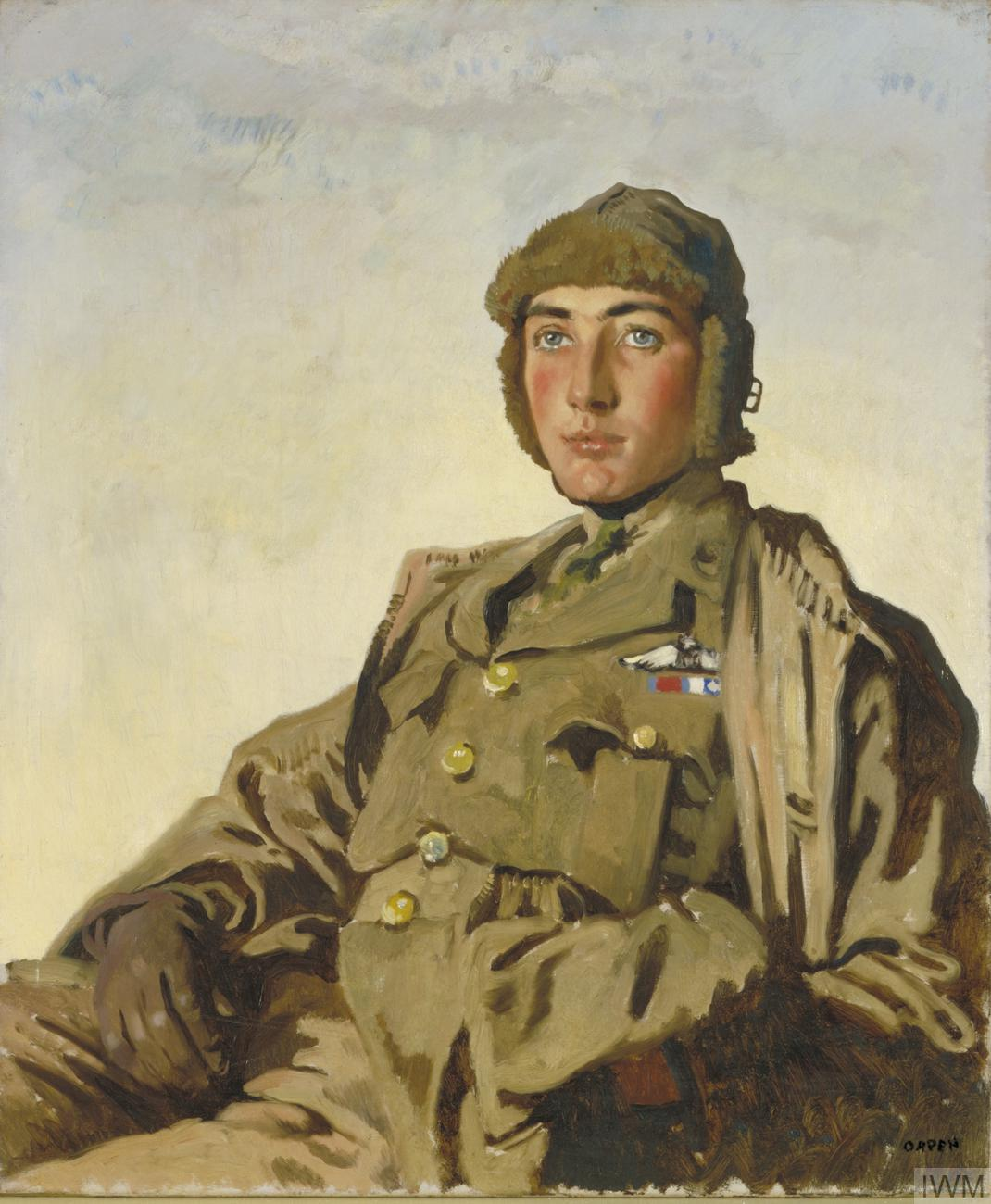
Flying ace Arthur Rhys-Davids is credited with 25 aerial victories.

Pilots represented on the Flying Services Memorial include:

- Douglas John Bell – No. 3rd Squadron RAF, died on 27 May 1918. He was awarded the Military Cross and Bar.
- Francis Cubbon – No.20 Squadron RFC, died on 9 June 1917. He was credited with 21 aerial victories, and was awarded the Military Cross and Bar.
- Lanoe Hawker – No. 24 Squadron RFC, died on 23 November 1916, . He was posted back to England in late 1915, with seven victories, making him the first British flying ace. He was awarded the Distinguished Service Order and the Victoria Cross. He died in duel with 'the Red Baron,' Manfred von Richthofen.
- Louis Fleeming Jenkin – No, 1 Squadron RFC, died on 11 September 1917. He was credited with 22 aerial victories, and was awarded the Military Cross and Bar.
- Harry George Ernest Luchford – No. 20 Squadron RFC died on 2 December 1917. He was credited with 24 aerial victories, and was awarded the Military Cross and Bar.
- Mick Mannock – No.85 Squadron RAF, died on 26 July 1918. He was awarded the Military Cross and Bar, the Distinguished Service Order and Two Bars, and the Victoria Cross.
- Arthur Rhys-Davids – 56 Squadron RFC, died on 27 October 1917. Military Cross and Bar and the Distinguished Service Order.
- Frederick Thayre – 20 Squadron RFC, died on 9 June 1917.Military Cross and Bar.
- Samuel Frederick Henry Thompson – No. 22 Squadron RAF, died 27 September 1918. Awarded the Military Cross and the Distinguished Flying Cross.
- Frederick Carr Armstrong
- Carleton Main Clement
- Valentine Collins
- Pruett Dennett
- Gordon Budd Irving
- Patrick Anthony Langan-Byrne
- John Joseph Malone
- Alfred Edwin McKay
- Maurice Mealing
- Guy Borthwick Moore
- Guy William Price
- Ellis Vair Reid
- Alfred Shepherd
- Noel Webb
- John George Will – Scotland rugby international.
- Herbert Gould
