= Sydney A. Oades =

British World War I flying ace

Sydney Arthur Oades
- Born: 27 September 1890; Brixton, London, England
- Died: 13 January 1961 (aged 70); Kingston upon Thames, Surrey, England
- Military career
- Allegiance: United Kingdom
- Branch: British Army; Royal Air Force
- Service years: 1915–1919, 1921, 1940–1941
- Rank: Flying Officer
- Units: Royal Engineers; No. 22 Squadron RFC
- Conflicts: World War I • Western Front; World War II
- Awards: Military Cross
- Other work: Retail costumier

Sydney Arthur Oades MC (27 September 1890 – 13 January 1961) was a British World War I flying ace credited with 11 official aerial victories. He made a brief return to service for World War II; ill health ended his military career.

== World War I ==
Oades enlisted into the Royal Engineers on 14 September 1915, serving as a sapper. He transferred to the Royal Flying Corps, and on 15 May 1917 was commissioned a temporary second lieutenant, and confirmed in his rank on 22 June.

By late 1917, he was posted to No. 22 Squadron as a Bristol F.2 Fighter pilot. On 27 October, he and his observer drove a German Rumpler reconnaissance aircraft down out of control for Oades' first aerial victory. He then teamed with John Jones for his next two wins; on both 5 and 6 December, they destroyed German reconnaissance aircraft. With a different observer manning the rear guns, he drove down an Albatros D.V north of Roulers, Belgium on 6 January 1918. Oades then crewed up with Stanton Bunting; the new pair began a run of seven successes on 30 January 1918 by driving down a German reconnaissance aircraft to make Oades an ace. On 17 February, they destroyed an Albatros D.V; the next day, they drove down another out of control. On the 26th, in two separate engagements, they burned an Albatros D.V and drove a second one down. On 5 March 1918, they destroyed two more German aircraft in an action that saw both RFC crewmen wounded. By now, Bunting was also an ace, though an undecorated one. Oades, on the other hand, would receive a Military Cross in April for his exploits. Oades was injured in an aircraft crash on 13 March 1918; he would not score another victory.

== Post World War I ==
Oades was transferred to the RAF's unemployed list on 11 April 1919, but was temporarily restored to active duty as a flying officer between 9 April and 5 June 1921.

== World War II and beyond ==
Oades was appointed a pilot officer on probation in the Royal Air Force Volunteer Reserve for the duration of hostilities on 22 July 1940. However, he was forced to surrender his commission on 12 December 1941 because of health issues.

He retired from the profession of retail costumier. He died on 13 January 1961 while residing in Kingston upon Thames, Surrey.

== Honours and awards ==
Military Cross
Temporary Second Lieutenant Sydney Arthur Oades, General List and R.F.C.

"For conspicuous gallantry and devotion to duty. On six different occasions during four months he has driven down three enemy machines which crashed on reaching the ground, and has destroyed two others, causing them to descend in flames. A sixth machine, after he had fired eighty rounds into it, turned over and went down spinning out of control, but owing to bad visibility it was not observed to crash. In addition to these he has brought down another three hostile machines out of control, and has always shown the most magnificent dash, gallantry, and determination."
