= Christopher Shannon (RAF airman) =

English World War I flying ace (1899–??)

Christopher James Shannon DFM
- Born: 1899; Stamford Hill, London, England
- Died: Unknown
- Military career
- Allegiance: United Kingdom
- Branch: British Army; Royal Air Force
- Rank: Sergeant
- Unit: No. 22 Squadron RFC
- Conflicts: World War I • Western Front
- Awards: Distinguished Flying Medal

Sergeant Christopher James Shannon DFM (born 1899, date of death unknown) was an English First World War flying ace credited with five aerial victories.

In 1917 Shannon was serving in No. 22 Squadron RFC, flying as an observer/gunner in the Bristol F.2b two-seater fighter. His first aerial victory came 21 August 1917 with pilot Lieutenant T. W. Martin, driving down out of control a Fokker D.VII north of Cambrai. His subsequent victories were gained with pilot Lieutenant Frank George Gibbons. He destroyed two D.VIIs over Haynecourt on 2 September, drove down another D.VII over Quesnoy Wood on 16 September, and drove down his fifth and final D.VII between Sensée Canal and Cambrai on 27 September.

On 31 December 1918 Shannon was awarded the Distinguished Flying Medal.
