= Stanley Wallage =

Stanley Harry Wallage
- Born: 24 July 1895; Ipswich, Suffolk, England
- Died: 17 April 1926 (aged 30); Amman, Jordan
- Military career
- Allegiance: United Kingdom
- Branch: British Army; Royal Air Force
- Service years: c.1917–1919 1921–1926
- Rank: Flight lieutenant
- Units: Suffolk Regiment; No. 22 Squadron RFC/RAF; No. 14 Squadron RAF
- Conflicts: World War I • Western Front
- Awards: Military Cross

Flight Lieutenant Stanley Harry Wallage MC (24 July 1895 – 17 April 1926) was a British flying ace credited with ten aerial victories in World War I. He would continue to serve in the RAF post-war until his death in a flying accident.

== Early life ==
Wallage was born in Ipswich, Suffolk, the son of Christopher and Mary Wallage.

== World War I ==
Wallage first served with the Suffolk Regiment, but on 3 May 1917 he was commissioned from cadet to temporary second lieutenant on the General List to serve in the Royal Flying Corps. On 26 July 1917 he was appointed a flying officer and confirmed in his rank.

After his training as a pilot, he was posted to No. 22 Squadron RFC to fly a Bristol F.2 Fighter. His first aerial victory came on 18 February 1918. His second and third came on 11 March, and he gained six more in May, bringing his total to nine. His exploits earned him the Military Cross, which was gazetted on 16 September 1918. His citation read:

Temporary Second Lieutenant Stanley Harry Wallage, General List and RAF.

"For conspicuous gallantry and devotion to duty during recent operations. He personally destroyed seven enemy machines. He showed a fine spirit of dash and tenacity, and his skill and success as a fighting pilot was a fine example to others in his squadron."

On 26 September 1918, he was promoted to temporary captain while so employed and gained his tenth and final victory on 4 November, just a week before the Armistice brought an end to the fighting.

He was again graded for purposes of pay and allowances as a captain on 1 May 1919, but he was then transferred to the unemployed list on 18 May.

=== List of aerial victories ===
Combat record
No.	Date/Time	Aircraft/ Serial No.	Opponent	Result	Location	Notes
1	18 February 1918 @ 1400 hours	Bristol F.2 Fighter (C4808)	German reconnaissance aircraft	Driven down out of control	Seclin, France	Observer/gunner: John Jones
2	11 March 1918 @ 1420 hours	Bristol F.2 Fighter (A7286)	Albatros D.V fighter	Driven down out of control	Lomme, France	Observer/gunner: John Jones
3	11 March 1918 @ 1420 hours	Bristol F.2 Fighter (A7286)	Albatros D.V fighter	Driven down out of control	Ligny, France	Observer/gunner: John Jones
4	8 May 1918 @ 1900 hours	Bristol F.2 Fighter (C795)	Pfalz D.III fighter	Destroyed	North of La Bassée, France	Observer/gunner: George Thomson
5	13 May 1918 @ 1040–1045 hours	Bristol F.2 Fighter (C795)	DFW reconnaissance aircraft	Driven down out of control	La Bassée, France	Observer/gunner: George Thomson
6	13 May 1918 @ 1040–1045 hours	Bristol F.2 Fighter (C795)	DFW reconnaissance aircraft	Driven down out of control	La Bassée, France	Observer/gunner: George Thomson
7	22 May 1918 @ 1030 hours	Bristol F.2 Fighter (C795)	Albatros D.V fighter	Destroyed	Hancourt, France	Observer/gunner: A. P. Stoyle
8	22 May 1918 @ 1030 hours	Bristol F.2 Fighter (C795)	Albatros D.V fighter	Driven down out of control	Hancourt, France	Observer/gunner: A. P. Stoyle
9	26 May 1918 @ 1945 hours	Bristol F.2 Fighter	Albatros D.V fighter	Destroyed	Southeast of Armentières, France	Observer/gunner: A. P. Stoyle
10	4 November 1918 @ 1415 hours	Bristol F.2 Fighter (E2454)	Pfalz D.XII fighter	Driven down out of control	Northwest of Bavay, France	Observer/gunner: Dennis Waight

== Post-war career ==
Wallage returned to the RAF on 21 January 1921 when granted a Short Service Commission with the rank of flying officer, and he was promoted to flight lieutenant on 1 January 1924. On 4 February 1925 he was granted a permanent commission.

On 17 April 1926 Wallage was serving in No. 14 Squadron when he and Squadron Leader Harley Alec Tweedie were killed when their Airco DH.9A crashed at Amman, Transjordan.
