= Herbert Gould =

British World War I flying ace

- Born: 23 December 1891; Sydney, Australia
- Died: 14 August 1918 (aged 26) (MIA) disappeared near Douai, France
- Burial place: Arras Flying Services Memorial, Pas de Calais, France
- Relatives: Nathaniel Gould (father)
- Military career
- Allegiance: United Kingdom
- Branch: British Army; Royal Air Force
- Service years: 1914–1918
- Rank: Captain
- Units: City of London Yeomanry; No. 18 Squadron RFC/RAF
- Conflicts: World War I
- Awards: Military Cross

Captain Herbert Ruska Gould (23 December 1891 – 14 August 1918) was a British World War I flying ace credited with six aerial victories.

== Biography ==
Gould was born in Sydney, Australia, the second son of English journalist and novelist Nathaniel "Nat" Gould and Elizabeth Madeline Gould (née Ruska). When he was four his family returned to England, living in Bedfont, Middlesex, where Gould attended the Highfields Road School in Chertsey. Gould then obtained a position as a clerk in an oil firm in the City of London, and joined the City of London Yeomanry as a private at the outbreak of World War I.

In mid-1917 Gould transferred to the Royal Flying Corps as a cadet, being appointed a probationary second lieutenant on 5 July 1917. He was confirmed in his rank, on completion of his training, on 8 October.

Gould was assigned to No. 18 Squadron on the Western Front, flying the Airco DH.4 day bomber. He gained his first victory on 26 March 1918 destroying an Albatros D.V over Bihucourt. On 12 April he took a share in the downing of two Pfalz D.III's over Estaires, and drove down another solo in the same area on 9 May. On 24 June he was appointed a flight commander with the temporary rank of captain. He drove down another Pfalz D.III over Douai, France on 31 July, and a shared in the driving down of a Fokker D.VII west of there on 9 August.

== Disappearance ==
Gould was reported missing in action near Douai on 14 August 1918, together with his gunner/observer Second Lieutenant Ewart William Frederick Jinman. As he has no known grave, his name is included on the Flying Services Memorial at Arras in northern France.

Gould was awarded the Military Cross, which was gazetted on 13 September, after his death. His citation read:

Temporary Lieutenant Herbert Ruska Gould, General List and Royal Air Force.

For conspicuous gallantry and devotion to duty. He has carried out 24 successful bombing raids, several of which he has led, and 26 low reconnaissance and bombing flights, as well as many low-flying, harassing and bombing patrols, during which many direct hits have been obtained and severe casualties inflicted. He has destroyed three enemy machines and has shown a very high spirit of zeal throughout.

== See also ==
- List of people who disappeared
