= Alfred Shepherd =

- Born: 13 April 1893; Nowra, New South Wales, Australia
- Died: 20 July 1917 (aged 24); Zonnebeke, Belgium
- Burial place: Arras Flying Services Memorial, France
- Military career
- Allegiance: Australia; United Kingdom
- Branch: Australian Imperial Force (1915–16); Royal Flying Corps (1916–17)
- Service years: 1915–1917
- Rank: Second Lieutenant
- Units: 30th Infantry Battalion AIF; 46th Infantry Battalion AIF; No. 29 Squadron RFC
- Conflicts: First World War
- Awards: Distinguished Service Order; Military Cross; Mentioned in Despatches

Alfred Seymour Shepherd, DSO, MC (13 April 1893 – 20 July 1917) was an Australian fighter ace of the First World War. He was credited with ten aerial victories. A civil engineer by profession, he enlisted in the Australian Imperial Force in 1915, and served with infantry battalions in France. He transferred to the Royal Flying Corps in 1916 and was posted to No. 29 Squadron, operating Nieuport fighters. After barely two months at the front, during which his victories earned him the Military Cross and the Distinguished Service Order, he was shot down and killed by a German ace in July 1917. He was buried in France.

== Early life and infantry service ==
Alfred Seymour Shepherd was born to James and Emma Shepherd on 13 April 1893 in Nowra, New South Wales. Educated at Bomaderry School, Shepherd went on to study at the University of Sydney, graduating with a Bachelor of Engineering degree; he also served four years in the Sydney University Scouts.

Shepherd was employed as a civil engineer and living in Petersham, New South Wales, when he enlisted in the Australian Imperial Force at Warwick Farm on 8 September 1915. He was commissioned a second lieutenant on 1 December. Promoted to lieutenant in the 30th Battalion on 16 January 1916, he sailed with the unit's 4th Reinforcements for the Middle East on 11 March. In May he was transferred to 46th Battalion, and deployed to France the following month. After service with the infantry, he transferred to the Royal Flying Corps (RFC) on 22 October 1916.

== Aerial service ==
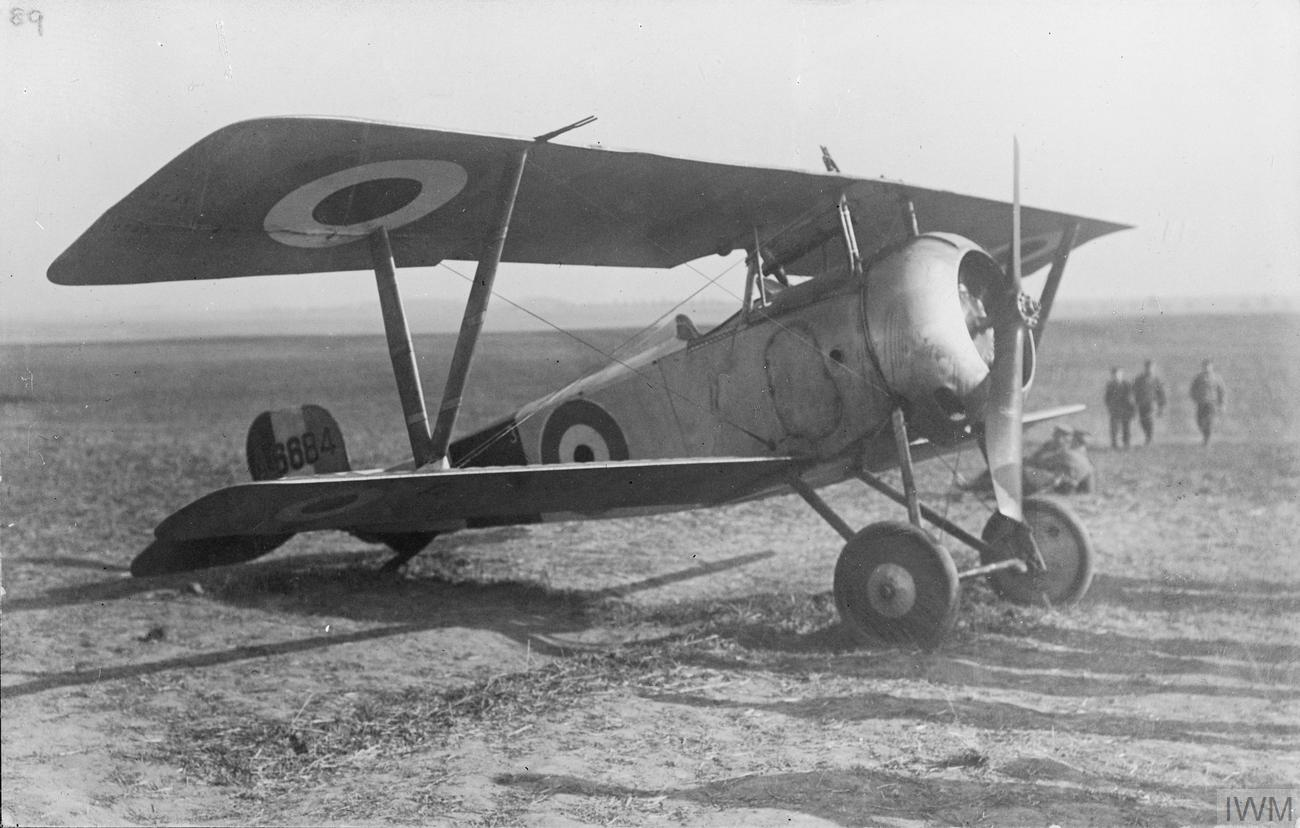
Nieuport fighter, which equipped No. 29 Squadron RFC beginning in March 1917

On 25 April 1917, Shepherd was posted to No. 29 Squadron RFC as a Nieuport fighter pilot. Operating from Le Hameau, the squadron had only re-equipped with Nieuports in March. In little more than two months Shepherd claimed ten aerial victories, starting with an Albatros D.III on 11 May, and was awarded the Military Cross (MC). The citation for his MC, promulgated in The London Gazette on 16 August 1917, read:

2nd Lt. Alfred Seymour Shepherd, R.F.C., Spec. Res. For conspicuous gallantry and devotion to duty. While on balloon attack he came under heavy fire from a rocket battery. He attacked this battery from a low altitude, silencing it, and dispersing the gunners. He then returned to the attack on a balloon, and fired all his ammunition, and though his machine was badly hit, crossed the line at 100 feet.

Shepherd was promoted to captain and appointed a flight commander on 13 July 1917. One week later, having just been awarded the Distinguished Service Order (DSO), he was shot down and killed in action near Zonnebeke, Belgium, by German ace Alfred Niederhoff, of Jasta 11. Shepherd's ten victories included four aircraft destroyed and six out of control. He is commemorated on the Arras Flying Services Memorial at the Pas de Calais, France, and in the Commemorative Roll at the Australian War Memorial, Canberra. The citation for his DSO, gazetted on 17 September 1917, read:

2nd Lt. Alfred Seymour Shepherd, M.C., R.F.C., Spec. Res. For conspicuous gallantry and devotion to duty on numerous occasions when engaged in combat with hostile aircraft. Though surrounded by enemy machines, he continued to fight for nearly an hour with the utmost gallantry and determination against two hostile formations, finally bringing down one of the enemy out of control. Within a month he brought down seven hostile machines completely out of control.

Shepherd scored all of his victories flying the Nieuport 23.
