= Listed buildings in Ranskill =

Ranskill is a civil parish in the Bassetlaw District of Nottinghamshire, England. The parish contains four listed buildings that are recorded in the National Heritage List for England. All the listed buildings are designated at Grade II, the lowest of the three grades, which is applied to "buildings of national importance and special interest". The parish contains the village of Ranskill and the surrounding area. All the listed buildings are in the village, and consist of houses and a pigeoncote.

== Buildings ==
Name and location	Photograph	Date	Notes
Old Hall; 53.38280°N 1.01659°W		Mid 18th century	The house is in red brick, rendered at the front, on a plinth, with a moulded cornice and a hipped pantile roof. There are three storeys and three bays, with sash windows in the lower two floors and casement windows in the top floor. To the right is a single-storey single-bay wing, at the rear are later extensions, and to the left is a rendered and stone-coped wall with an archway.
Pigeoncote, Old Hall; 53.38265°N 1.01644°W		Late 18th century	The pigeoncote is in red brick, partly rendered, with a floor band, dentilled eaves, and a pyramidal pantile roof with an iron wind vane. There are three storeys and a single bay. On the west side is a semicircular fixed light under which is a panel with pigeonholes and a wooden ledge. There are owl holes on the west and north sides.
High House Farmhouse; 53.38259°N 1.01850°W	—	Early 19th century	The farmhouse is rendered, on a plinth, with a modillion cornice and a slate roof. There are two storeys and three bays, the left bay projecting under a modillion pediment. The doorway has pilasters, a traceried fanlight, and a moulded arch. To its left is a canted bay window, and the other windows are sashes. At the rear are two- and single-storey wings.
Old Poplar Farmhouse; 53.38174°N 1.01914°W		c. 1840	The house is in red brick on a stone plinth, with a stuccoed floor band, and a hipped slate roof with overhanging eaves on wooden brackets. There are two storeys and an L-shaped plan, with a front range of three bays, and later single-storey rear extensions. The central doorway has pilasters, side lights flanked by more pilasters, a fanlight, and a moulded entablature. The windows are sashes with splayed brick lintels.
