= Charles George Gass =

WW1 British flying ace (1898-1977)

- Born: 18 April 1898; Chelsea, London, England
- Died: March 1977 (aged 78); Fulham, London, England
- Military career
- Allegiance: United Kingdom
- Branch: British Army; Royal Flying Corps
- Service years: c. 1916–1919; 1925–1928; 1940–1954
- Rank: Squadron Leader
- Units: London Regiment; No. 22 Squadron RFC
- Conflicts: First World War; Second World War
- Awards: Military Cross

Charles George Gass, MC (18 April 1898 – March 1977) was the highest scoring observer ace during the First World War, with a total of 39 victories (16 solo) scored serving as a gunner flying with various pilots. After working in the Post Office between the wars, he was recalled to the Royal Air Force in early 1940.

== Early life and First World War ==
Gass was born in Chelsea, London, on 18 April 1898. He originally joined the 2/24th Battalion, London Regiment, of the Territorial Force and became a sergeant, the rank he held when he first entered a theatre of war on 25 June 1916. He was then commissioned as a second lieutenant in the 17th Battalion, London Regiment, and was attached to the Royal Flying Corps from 1917. On 26 March 1918, he was assigned to No. 22 Squadron as an observer on Bristol F.2bs, flying in France. The two-seater "Brisfit" had a maximum speed of 123 mph, which made it as fast as or faster than most enemy fighters, and was manoeuvrable to boot. It had a forward-pointing Vickers machine gun for the pilot, and one or two Lewis machine guns that could be slid around on their Scarff ring mount by the observer/gunner to cover a wide field of fire.

=== Aerial victories ===
Gass soon showed his proficiency with the Lewis guns. He began by driving an Albatros D.V down out of control on 22 April 1918. Then he began one of the most spectacular months in First World War aerial warfare.

On 7 May, Gass was gunner on a Bristol piloted by ace Alfred Atkey; Gass was in Atkey's plane by Atkey's request. They flew one of two Brisfits that took on 20 German scouts. Gass and Atkey destroyed five of the attackers, sending two of them down in burning meteors of falling wreckage.

Gass claimed another German on 8 May while teamed with John Everard Gurdon. Then on the 9th, he and Atkey repeated themselves. Once again they flamed two Germans; additionally, they destroyed another German and drove two down out of the battle.

They then reeled off a series of multiple victory days. Two on the 15th; three on the 19th; three more on the 20th; two each on the 22nd, 30th, and 31st; three on the 27th. Gass had scored 28 times in the month, all but one in conjunction with Atkey. No one in the First World War scored more victories in a single month. He officially transferred to the nascent Royal Air Force on 22 May 1918.

Gass and Atkey scored another double on 2 June, which were Atkey's final victories. Then Gass was teamed with Lieutenant Edwin Bromley, and scored twice on the 5th. On 26 July, he shot down another German while teamed with Lieutenant Samuel Thompson.

In August, Gass was teamed with Lieutenant John Everard Gurdon, who had been the pilot of the other Brisfit on 7 May. They tallied five wins together, with the last coming on 13 August. Gass was transferred for pilot training soon after, but the war ended before he qualified for his wings.

Gass's final tally totalled 39. Broken down, they amounted to 5 destroyed in flames, including one victory which was shared with other planes; 12 others destroyed; 22 down "out of control". It was the sort of performance that had garnered multiple decorations for single-seat fighter pilots. For Gass, it brought a Military Cross gazetted on 16 September 1918, the citation read:

2nd Lt. Charles George Gass, Lond. R., attd. R.A.F. For conspicuous gallantry and devotion to duty. During many engagements, generally against heavy odds, he destroyed five enemy aircraft. He showed great ability and an entire disregard for personal danger.

Gass received his MC from King George V at Buckingham Palace on 16 November 1918.

== Interwar period ==
Gass ceased to be actively employed by the RAF on 11 April 1919, and relinquished his Territorial commission in 17th Battalion, London Regiment on 30 September 1921. He lived in South London after the war, the address given for despatch of his campaign medals was 95 Flood Street, Chelsea. He married Geraldine Marie Insani in the Fulham registration district in the second quarter of 1921. He joined the Civil Service as a Post Office clerk on 27 June 1922. He joined the Reserve of Air Force Officers as a pilot officer on 30 March 1925, and was promoted flying officer on 6 May. He left the reserve on 30 September 1928. His wife petitioned for divorce in 1934. They had had two sons, Geoffrey in 1922 and Donald in 1924.

== Second World War and after ==
With the Second World War escalating, Gass was recommissioned as a pilot officer in the Administrative and Special Duties Branch, RAF Volunteer Reserve (RAFVR), on 8 January 1940. He was promoted war substantive flying officer on 7 September, and confirmed in that rank on 8 January 1941. He was later promoted flight lieutenant and, on 1 January 1944, temporary squadron leader. He remarried, to Kathleen Fitzgerald, in the first quarter of 1944. He retired from the RAFVR on 10 August 1954, retaining the rank of squadron leader.
