= George Thomson (RAF officer) =

- Born: 3 October 1896; Thornhill, Dumfries, Scotland
- Died: Post August 1918
- Military career
- Allegiance: United Kingdom
- Branch: Royal Flying Corps; Royal Air Force
- Rank: Lieutenant
- Unit: No. 22 Squadron RAF
- Awards: DFC

George Thomson DFC (born 3 October 1896, date of death unknown) was a Canadian First World War flying ace, officially credited with 14 victories.

Born in Thornhill, Dumfries, Scotland, Thomson emigrated to Canada. Working as a printer in Celista, British Columbia, Thomson enlisted in 1914, serving in the 30th Battalion of the Canadian Expeditionary Force and the 48th Highlanders of Canada. Thomson was wounded twice while serving with the 7/8th King's Own Scottish Borderers. In October 1917 Thomson transferred to the RAF, and in 1918 he was posted to the 22 Squadron as an observer, where he scored 14 victories. Thomson returned to the Home Establishment in August 1918 to be trained as a pilot. His death date is unknown, although he is not listed among the few surviving World War I veterans.

== Text of citations ==
"Lieut. George Thomson (King's Own Scottish Borderers).

A brilliant and intrepid observer in whom his pilot places implicit confidence when engaged in action. He has personally accounted for nine enemy machines. On one raid, when acting as escort, 15 enemy aeroplanes were encountered; of these this officer shot down two, which crashed, and one out of control." Supplement to The London Gazette, 21 September 1918 (30913/11255)
