= Ranskill =

Village in Nottinghamshire, England

Coordinates: 53.38030°N 1.01680°W

- Village and civil parish
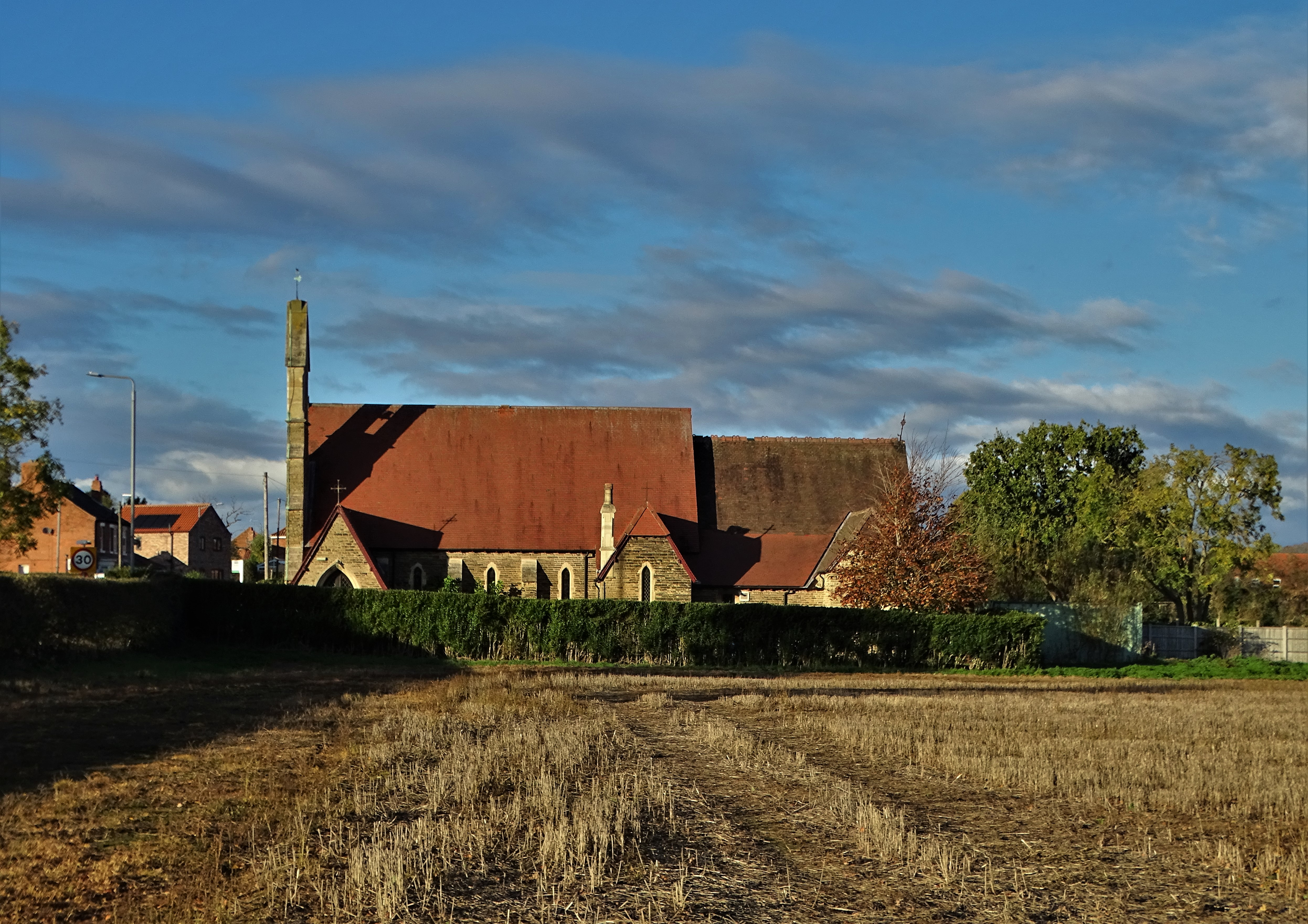
- Church of St Barnabas

- Location within Nottinghamshire
- Interactive map of Ranskill
- Area: 2.05 sq mi (5.3 km^{2})
- Population: 1,435 (2021)
  - Density: 700/sq mi (270/km^{2})
- OS grid reference: SK 655875
  - London: 135 mi (217 km) SSE
- District: Bassetlaw
- Shire county: Nottinghamshire
- Region: East Midlands
- Country: England
- Sovereign state: United Kingdom
- Post town: RETFORD
- Postcode district: DN22
- Dialling code: 01777
- Police: Nottinghamshire
- Fire: Nottinghamshire
- Ambulance: East Midlands
- UK Parliament: Bassetlaw
- Website: ranskillparishcouncil.gov.uk

Ranskill is a village and civil parish in the Bassetlaw district of Nottinghamshire, England, with its nearest town being Retford approximately 5 miles (8.0 kilometres) south. The Ranskill parish according to the 2001 census has 2,226 residents, falling to 1,362 at the 2011 census, and improving to 1,435 at the 2021 census. There is also a Bassetlaw ward called Ranskill. This ward had a population of 2,417 at the 2011 census.

Ranskill dates back to the Danish invasions of the 9th century where the name 'Ravenskelf' meant 'shelving knoll/ridge of the raven'.

The village features St. Barnabas Church, built in 1878 and a Methodist chapel first built in 1868 and expanded in the 1930s. The Methodist chapel also features a schoolroom, where today the local newspaper, the STAR (Scrooby, Torworth and Ranskill) is printed. Ranskill also has a reading room, built in 1891 by the Gillott family as a library and reading room, where in 1909 the room was changed to include billiard tables. Today the room is still in use and features two billiard tables, two pool tables and a darts board.

The East Coast Main Line railway passes to the east of the village, which was the site of a Royal Ordnance Factory from 1940 until 1975. Ranskill also had a railway station which opened in 1852 where there was a half-hourly service between Retford and Doncaster. The station closed in 1958.

== See also ==
- Listed buildings in Ranskill
- Royal Ordnance Factory (ROF) Ranskill
