= John Everard Gurdon =

British World War I flying ace (1898–1973)

John Everard Gurdon DFC
- Born: 24 May 1898; Balham, Surrey, England
- Died: 14 April 1973 (aged 74); Alassio, Italy
- Military career
- Allegiance: United Kingdom
- Branch: British Army; Royal Air Force
- Service years: 1917–1918; 1940–1941
- Rank: Pilot Officer
- Service number: 86019
- Units: Suffolk Regiment; No. 22 Squadron
- Conflicts: First World War; Second World War
- Awards: Distinguished Flying Cross
- Other work: Journalist and author

John Everard Gurdon, DFC (24 May 1898 – 14 April 1973), was a British flying ace in the First World War credited with twenty-eight victories.

== Early life and background ==
Gurdon was born in Balham, Surrey, the son of John Gurdon and Mary Gray Rattray, and attended Tonbridge School in Kent. From September 1916 he attended the Royal Military College, Sandhurst, as a "Gentlemen Cadet", and after passing out (graduating), he was commissioned as a second lieutenant in the Suffolk Regiment on 1 May 1917.

== First World War service ==
Gurdon was seconded to the Royal Flying Corps in May 1917, and was confirmed in his rank of the General List on 10 August 1917. He completed his pilot training at Central Flying School and was sent to No. 22 Squadron in 1918, flying Bristol F.2 Fighters.

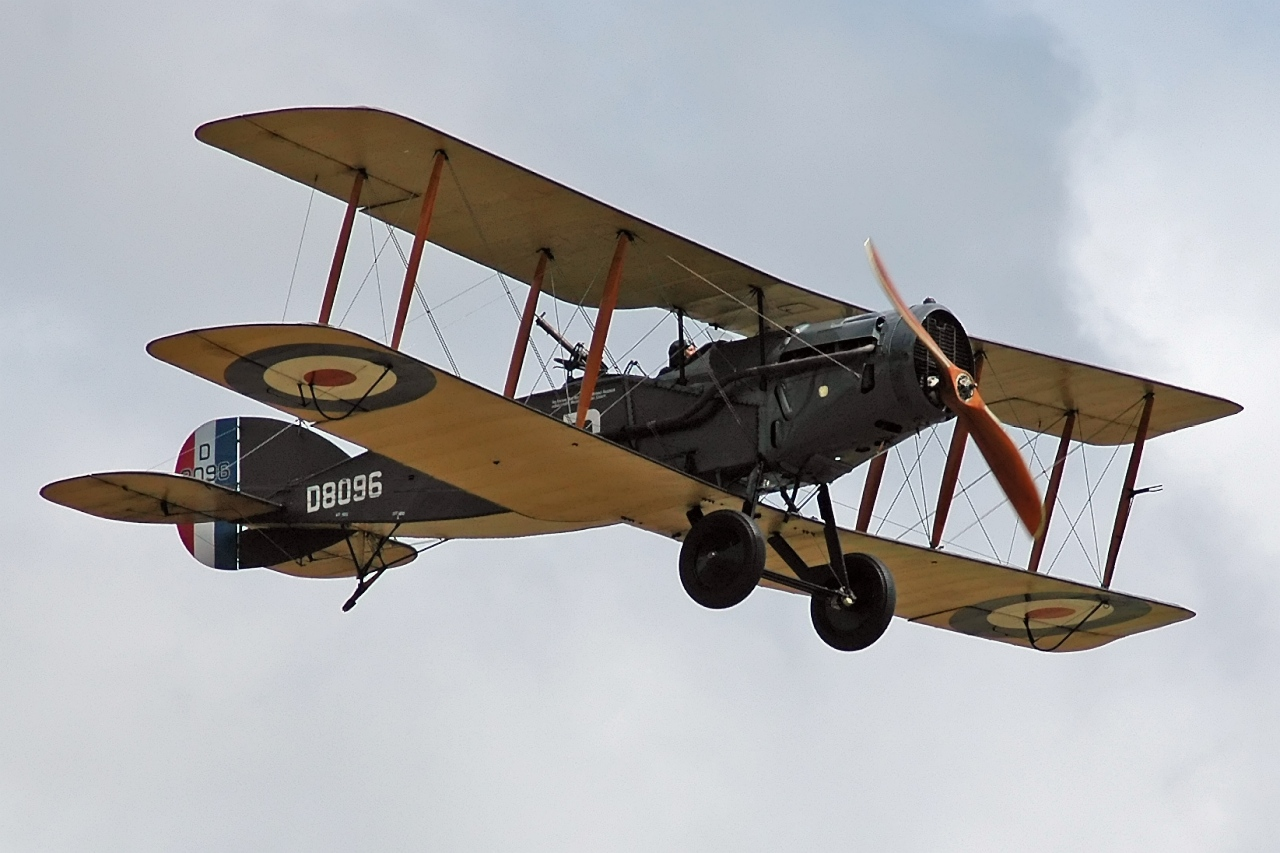
The Shuttleworth Collection's Bristol F.2B Fighter

Gurdon achieved all twenty-eight of his victories between 2 April and 13 August 1918 while flying the Bristol Fighter aircraft, seventeen of them using the front gun. On 7 May he was involved in an historic engagement known as the "Two versus Twenty". Gurdon, together with his observer 2nd Lt. John Thornton, in partnership with one other Bristol Fighter aircraft, piloted by Alfred Atkey with his observer Charles George Gass engaged twenty enemy aircraft. Gurdon and Thornton shot down three enemy aircraft; Atkey and Gass shot down five.

As a result of this action he was awarded the Distinguished Flying Cross, which was gazetted on 2 August. His citation read:

Lt. John Everard Gurdon.

This officer is a brilliant fighting pilot who on all occasions shows great determination with entire disregard of personal danger. He has personally destroyed nine enemy machines. On a recent date when on offensive patrol with another Bristol fighter he attacked a formation of seven enemy machines; one of these he shot down in flames. The enemy were then reinforced by two other formations, which brought their number up to twenty. Fighting continued for about half an hour when the Bristols broke off the engagement, their ammunition being exhausted. Only seven enemy machines remained, many having been seen to spin away, and one was shot down by this officer.

On 10 July his aircraft was badly shot up, Gurdon being hit by a bullet in the left arm, and his gunner, Lt. J. J. Scaramaga, being killed. He was appointed a flight commander with the rank of temporary captain on 23 July, but in August he received a concussion from an anti-aircraft shell near-miss. He was returned to the UK in September and relinquished his commission owing to his injuries on 21 December, but was permitted to retain the rank of captain.

His confirmed claims, in conjunction with his gunners, consisted of 13 and one shared aircraft destroyed, and 14 driven down 'out of control'.

== Interwar career ==
After the war Gurdon pursued a career as a journalist and author, publishing his first novel Over and Above in 1919, republished in 2018. He then translated Georg Paul Neumann's Die Deutschen Luftstreitkräfte im Weltkriege, an official history, which was published in English as The German Air Force in the Great War in 1921. Another novel Feeding The Wind was published in 1924. However, in December 1925 he was declared bankrupt. and over the next fifteen years, to pay off his creditors, Gurdon wrote several novels, and numerous short stories, mainly adventure stories aimed at young adults, and published in such magazines as The Modern Boy and Air Stories. He finally gained his discharge from bankruptcy in late 1937, but continued to publish regularly up to the outbreak of the Second World War.

== Second World War service ==
Despite being blinded in one eye after a car crash in 1935 and suffering a hip problem following an aircraft landing accident, Gurdon joined the Royal Air Force Volunteer Reserve, and was granted a commission "for the duration of hostilities" as a pilot officer (on probation) on 20 September 1940. He served as an instructor and managed to fly on several bombing operations unofficially as a front gunner on Wellingtons, but after a landing accident aggravated his existing hip problem he was forced to relinquish his commission on 29 September 1941.

== Later life ==
He published two more novels in the early 1950s.

John Gurdon died on 14 April 1973 in Alassio, Italy.

== Personal life ==
Gurdon married Florence M. Pleming in 1920 at Kensington, London. They had three sons, John (known as Robin), Philip, and David. The eldest, Sergeant John Robert Gurdon, was killed in action in April 1943 flying Wellingtons of No. 166 Squadron. Philip Gurdon was a member of No. 273 Squadron, flying Spitfires in Burma.

== Publications ==
Translations

- Neumann, Georg Paul (1921). Die Deutschen Luftstreitkräfte im Weltkriege [The German Air Force in the Great War]. London: Hodder & Stoughton Ltd.

Novels

- Over and Above. London: W. Collins Sons & Co. 1919.
- Feeding The Wind. London: Chapman & Dodd. 1924.
- The Sky Trackers. London: Frederick Warne & Co. 1931.
- Saracen Junior. London: Frederick Warne & Co. 1934.
- The King's Pipe. London: Frederick Warne & Co. 1934.
- The Secret of the Lab. London: Frederick Warne & Co. 1936.
- The Monkey Trick. London: George Newnes Ltd. 1936.
- Winged Warriors. London: George Newnes Ltd. 1936.
- Banners Yellow. London: George Newnes Ltd. 1938.
- A Matter of Course. London: Frederick Warne & Co. 1939.
- The Secret of the South. London: Frederick Warne & Co. 1950.
- The Riddle of the Forest. London: Thomas Nelson & Sons. 1952.
- Over and Above. London: Grub Street Publishing Ltd. 2018.

Short stories and articles

- "P.P.P.", Hutchinson's Adventure & Mystery Story Magazine, October 1928
- "The Bottomless Gulf", The Popular Magazine, 2 November 1929
- "The Schooling Bullet", The Strand, February 1930
- "Softy", Flying Stories, March 1930
- "The Sky Trackers", The Modern Boy, 31 May 1930
- "The Devil that Flies by Night", The Modern Boy, 7 June 1930
- "The Stolen Inventor", The Modern Boy, 14 June 1930
- "The Flying Fish", The Modern Boy, 21 June 1930
- "Black Pirates", The Modern Boy, 28 June 1930
- "The Bat's Prisoners", The Modern Boy, 5 July 1930
- "Thunder Over the Alps", The Modern Boy, 12 July 1930
- "The Menace of the Bat", The Modern Boy, 19 July 1930
- "The Sea-Hawk!", The Modern Boy, 18 November 1933
- "The Flying Treasure!", The Modern Boy, 25 November 1933
- "The Trickster Tricked!", The Modern Boy, 2 December 1933
- "Death Flies Low", George Bruce's Squadron, May 1934
- "Flight of a Lovebird", The (London) Evening News, 20 February 1935
- "Early Bird", Popular Flying, August 1935
- "The Dabu Devil", The Thriller, 28 December 1935
- "A Private War", Argosy (UK), February 1936
- "Winged Warriors", Air Stories, February 1936
- "Flash-Point", The (London) Evening News, 4 March 1936
- "The Loop of Death", Air Stories, May 1936
- "The Four Dumb Mouths", Air Stories, June 1936
- "The Brotherhood of Sin", Air Stories, July 1936
- "Spies Fly High", Air Stories, November 1936
- "First Solo", The Modern Boy's Annual, 1937
- "Striking a Bargain", The Modern Boy's Annual, 1938
- "Leashed Lightning", Fantasy, 1938
- "The Gentleman from Java", Air Stories, February 1938
- "The Mammoth and the Midge", Air Stories, September 1938
- "The Man Outside", Fantasy, 1939
- "Flight to Hell", Air Stories, October 1939
- "Alarums Aloft", The Modern Boy's Annual, 1941
