= No. 22 Squadron RAF =

Flying squadron of the Royal Air Force

- Squadron badge
- Active: 1915–1918 (RFC); 1918–1919; 1923–1934; 1934–1945; 1946–1946; 1955–2015; 2020–present
- Country: United Kingdom
- Branch: Royal Air Force
- Type: Flying squadron
- Role: Operational Evaluation Unit
- Part of: Joint Aviation Command
- Station: RAF Benson
- Mottos: Preux et audicieux (Latin for 'Valiant and brave')
- Aircraft: Aérospatiale Dauphin AH1; AgustaWestland Apache AH-64E; AgustaWestland Merlin HC4; AgustaWestland Wildcat AH1; Boeing Chinook HC5/HC6/HC6A

Insignia
- Tail codes: VR (Apr 1939 – Sep 1939); OA (Sep 1939 – Nov 1944)

No. 22 Squadron, also known as No. XXII Squadron, is an operational testing and evaluation squadron of the Royal Air Force. It operates all of Joint Aviation Command's helicopter types, including the Boeing Chinook, AgustaWestland Merlin HC4, Boeing AH-64E Apache and AgustaWestland Wildcat AH1. Formerly the Rotary Wing Operational Evaluation and Training Unit, the squadron ensures frontline crews have Qualified Warfare Instructors to support them on operations worldwide.

It was originally formed in 1915 as an aerial reconnaissance unit of the Royal Flying Corps serving on the Western Front during the First World War. Becoming part of the Royal Air Force on its formation in 1918, it was disbanded the following year as part of the post-First World War scaling back of the RAF. During the Second World War the squadron operated in the torpedo bomber role over the North Sea and then in the Mediterranean and the Far East. Between 1955 and 2015 the squadron was in the search and rescue role, operating the Westland Sea King HAR3 and HAR3A at three stations in the southern United Kingdom.

== History ==
=== First World War (1915–1918) ===
No. 22 Squadron was formed at Fort Rowner, Gosport on 1 September 1915 from a nucleus of men and equipment provided by No. 13 Squadron. The squadron trained on a variety of aircraft types, including the Royal Aircraft Factory BE.2c, the Maurice Farman Shorthorn, the Bleriot XI and the Curtiss JN-3. It received its intended operational type, the Royal Aircraft Factory FE.2b in February 1916, passing fourteen aircraft to No. 33 Squadron.

The squadron moved to France on 1 April 1916, and soon began carrying out reconnaissance missions over the front lines. It flew fighter patrols during the Battle of the Somme in July 1916, in addition to its normal reconnaissance and photography duties in support of the army. One notable casualty during the Somme was Auberon Herbert, 9th Baron Lucas, the former Liberal politician and cabinet minister, who was wounded when attacked by German fighter aircraft on 3 November 1916, and died of his wounds the same day.

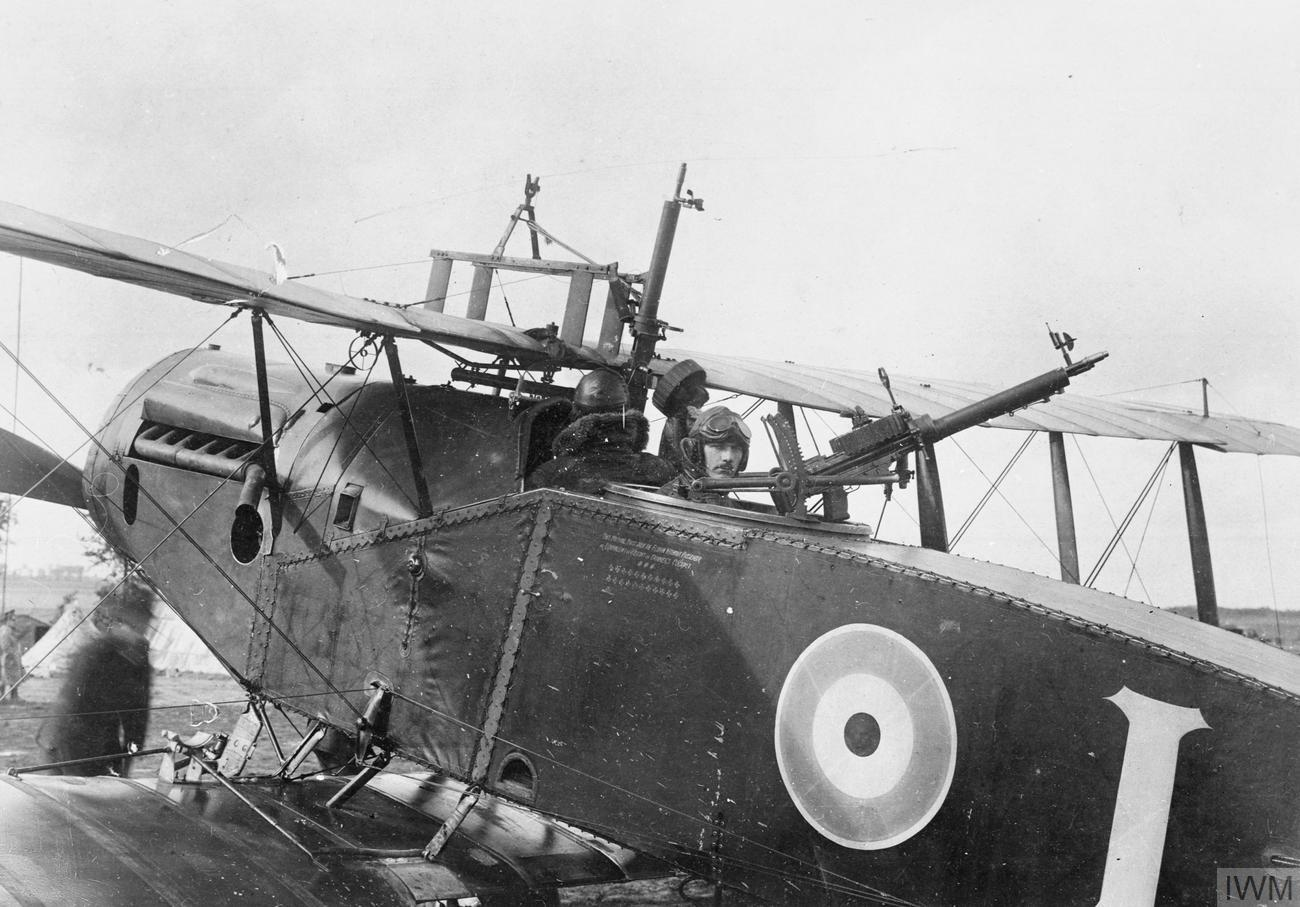
No. 22 Squadron Bristol F.2 Fighter in France, July 1918.

From July 1917, the squadron started to replace its the FE.2 with faster and more capable Bristol F.2 Fighters also known as the 'Brisfit', receiving its full complement of eighteen aircraft by 24 August. This was in time to allow the squadron to take part in the Battle of the Menin Road Ridge in September 1917. The squadron was heavily deployed during the German spring offensive of 1918, and was forced to change bases due to the German advance, and later, as the Allies drove the Germans out of France in the Hundred Days Offensive, changed bases to keep up with the Allied advances.

The squadron moved to Spich, near Cologne in Germany as part of the British Army of Occupation in March 1919, leaving for home at the end of August that year. After a period as a cadre unit (without aircraft) at RAF Ford in West Sussex, the squadron formally disbanded on 31 December 1919.

=== Interwar period (1919–1938) ===
The squadron's second incarnation was as one of two test squadrons (the other being No. 15 Squadron) supporting the Aeroplane Experimental Establishment at Martlesham Heath, Suffolk. For ten years following its reformation on 24 July 1923, the squadron was involved in testing new aircraft before they were accepted for service or sold overseas. The two test squadrons were disbanded on 1 May 1934.

The squadron reformed again on 1 May 1934 at RAF Donibristle near Edinburgh, Scotland in the torpedo bomber role, flying the Vickers Vildebeest I biplane. From March 1935, the squadron began to re-equip with the improved Vildebeest III, with a more powerful engine and carrying an observer as a third crew member. In October 1935, as part of Britain's response to the Abyssinia crisis, the squadron was deployed to Malta, returning to Britain in August 1936 after the threat of war between the United Kingdom and Italy receded.

On 14 December 1936, part of the squadron was detached to form No. 42 Squadron, also equipped with the Vildebeest, while in March 1938, No. 22 Squadron moved south to RAF Thorney Island in West Sussex.

=== Second World War (1939–1945) ===
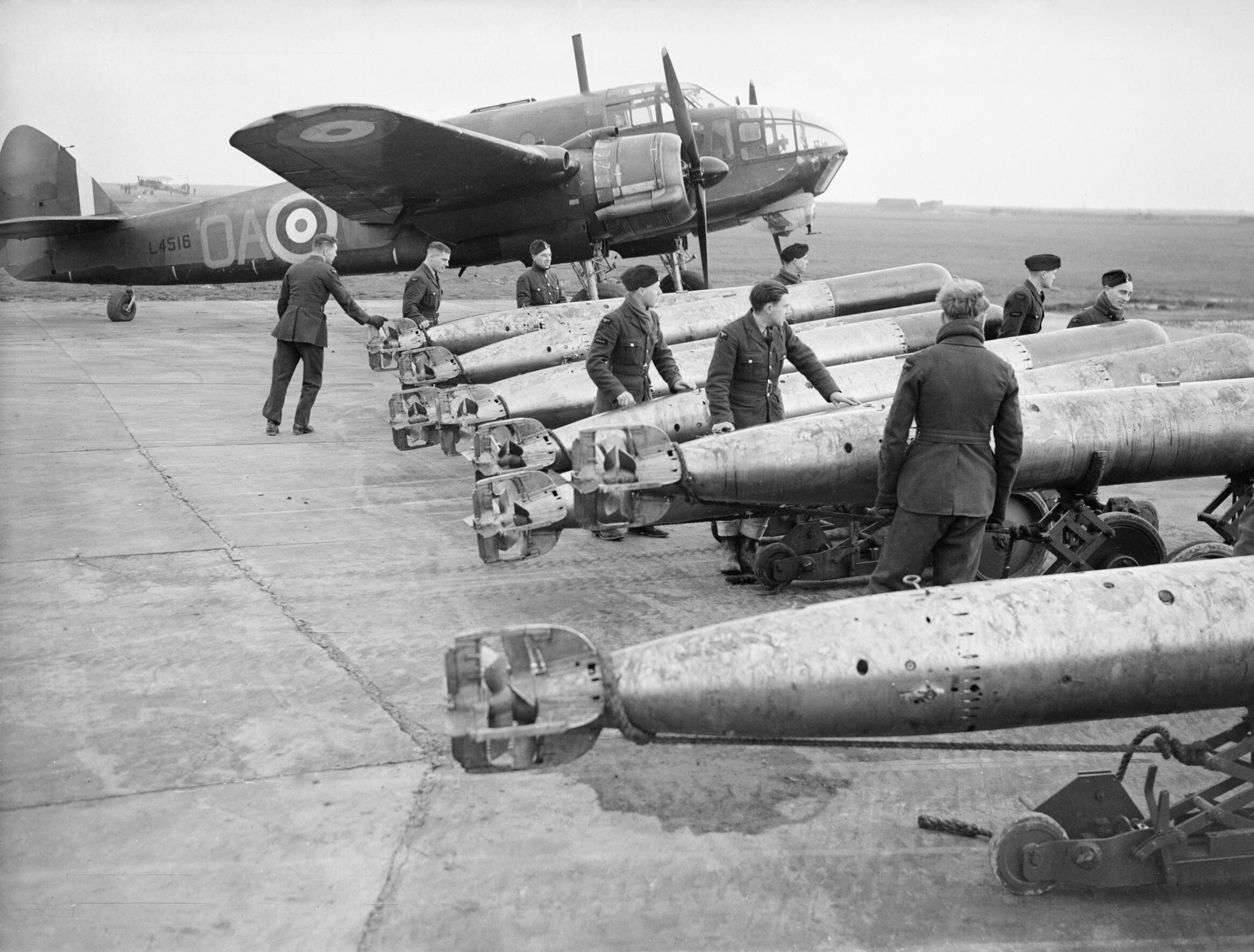
A Bristol Beaufort of No. 22 Squadron with an array of torpedoes at RAF North Coates in early December 1940.

The squadron was still equipped with the Vildebeest when the Second World War broke out in September 1939, with the squadron carrying out anti-submarine patrols over the English Channel. From November 1939, the squadron started to receive Bristol Beaufort twin-engined monoplanes to replace its obsolete biplanes. The Bristol Taurus engines of the Beaufort proved unreliable at first, and the squadron continuing to fly operations with the Vildebeest while converting to the Beaufort. It flew its last operational mission with the Vildebeest on 20 December 1939.

The squadron moved to RAF North Coates in Lincolnshire on 8 April 1940, flying its first operational sorties from that base on 15 April when nine Beauforts set out to lay mines off the mouth of the River Elbe. In this role, the unit flew sorties over the North Sea from North Coates, Thorney Island, St Eval and Portreath.

Flying Officer Kenneth Campbell was posthumously awarded the Victoria Cross for executing a torpedo attack on the Gneisenau in Brest harbour in April 1941. Despite atrocious weather having prevented the other aircraft in the mission from reaching the harbour and, with virtually no chance of pulling out of the harbour, Campbell pressed home his attack and badly damaged the ship, being shot down in the process. He and his crew were buried with full military honours by the Germans in the cemetery at Brest.

In 1942, the squadron was posted to North Africa before being moved to South East Asia, where it converted to the Bristol Beaufighter and continued its anti-shipping role, this time using rockets. It disbanded for the third time a month after war's end.

=== Cold War (1949–1990s) ===
No. 22 Squadron reformed in February 1955 with the Bristol Sycamore HC.12 helicopter at RAF Thorney Island. The squadron took on the search and rescue role with the Sycamore until the Westland Whirlwind replaced it in June 1955. The squadron was initially equipped with the Westland Whirlwind HAR.2 until August 1962, when it was replaced by the Whirlwind HAR.10.

Between 1955 and 1976 the squadron operated the following flights:

June 1955 – June 1956

- Headquarters – RAF Thorney Island, West Sussex
- Unknown flight – RAF Felixstowe, Suffolk
- Unknown flight – RAF Martlesham Heath, Suffolk
- Unknown flight – RAF Valley, Anglesey

June 1956 – April 1974

- Headquarters – RAF St Mawgan, Cornwall
- A Flight – RAF Chivenor, Devon
- Unknown flight – RAF Coltishall, Norfolk
- Unknown flight – RAF Felixstowe, Suffolk
- Unknown flight – RAF Manston, Kent
- Unknown flight – RAF Tangmere, West Sussex
- Unknown flight – RAF Thorney Island, West Sussex
- Unknown flight – RAF Valley, Anglesey

April 1974 – January 1976

- Headquarters – RAF Thorney Island, West Sussex
- B Flight – RAF Coltishall, Norfolk
- Unknown flight – RAF Brawdy, Pembrokeshire
- Unknown flight – RAF Chivenor, Devon
- Unknown flight – RAF Valley, Anglesey

January 1976 – June 1976

- Headquarters – RAF Finningley, Yorkshire
- Unknown Flight - RAF Brawdy, Pembrokeshire
- Unknown Flight - RAF Chivenor, Devon
- Unknown Flight - RAF Leconfield, East Riding of Yorkshire
- Unknown Flight - RAF Leuchars, Fife
- Unknown Flight - RAF Manston, Kent
- Unknown Flight - RAF Valley, Anglesey

On 11 November 1962, the FV Jeanne Gougy ran aground and capsized at Land's End, Cornwall. Eight of her twenty crew were rescued by helicopter or breeches buoy. Sergeant Eric Smith was awarded a George Medal for his actions.

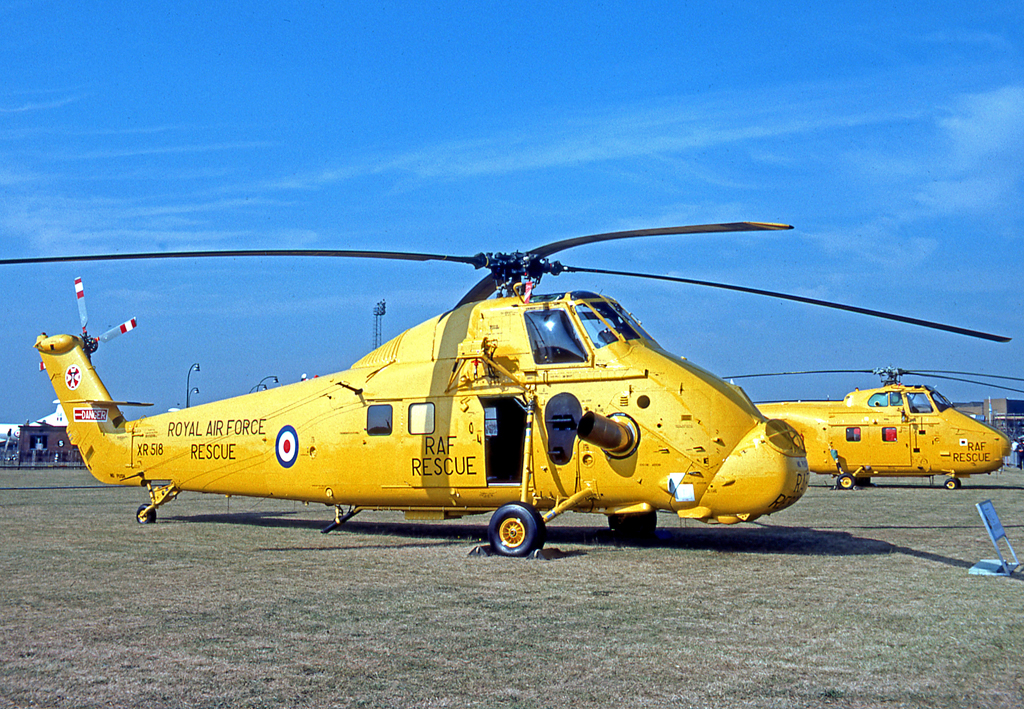
A No. 22 Squadron Westland Wessex HAR.2 and a Westland Whirlwind in the background at RAF Finningley in 1977

The squadron re-equipped with the Westland Wessex from June 1976. Its headquarters were at RAF Finningley and it had flights at:

- A Flight – RAF Chivenor, Devon
- B Flight – RAF Leuchars, Fife
- C Flight – RAF Valley, Anglesey
- D Flight – RAF Leconfield, East Riding of Yorkshire
- E Flight – RAF Manston, Kent and RAF Coltishall, Norfolk

B Flight was disbanded on 1 April 1993 and E Flight disbanded on 21 July 1994.

Finally, in the mid-1990s, the squadron received six newly built Westland Sea King HAR3A to supplement the Sea King HAR3 which replaced the Wessex aircraft with conversion training on the Mk3A being at Chivenor. The squadron headquarters moved from St Mawgan in 1995 to RMB Chivenor but was later in 2004 co-located with the newly built Search and Rescue Force Headquarters at RAF Valley. Detachments of at least two aircraft operated from three stations providing search and rescue cover in those parts of the country; these were:

- A Flight – RMB Chivenor, Devon
- B Flight – RAF Wattisham, Suffolk
- C Flight – RAF Valley, Anglesey

A and B Flights operated the Sea King HAR3A. C Flight shared a pool nominally of five Sea King HAR3 aircraft with No. 203 (Reserve) Squadron, the Sea King operational conversion unit.

=== 21st century (2000–present) ===
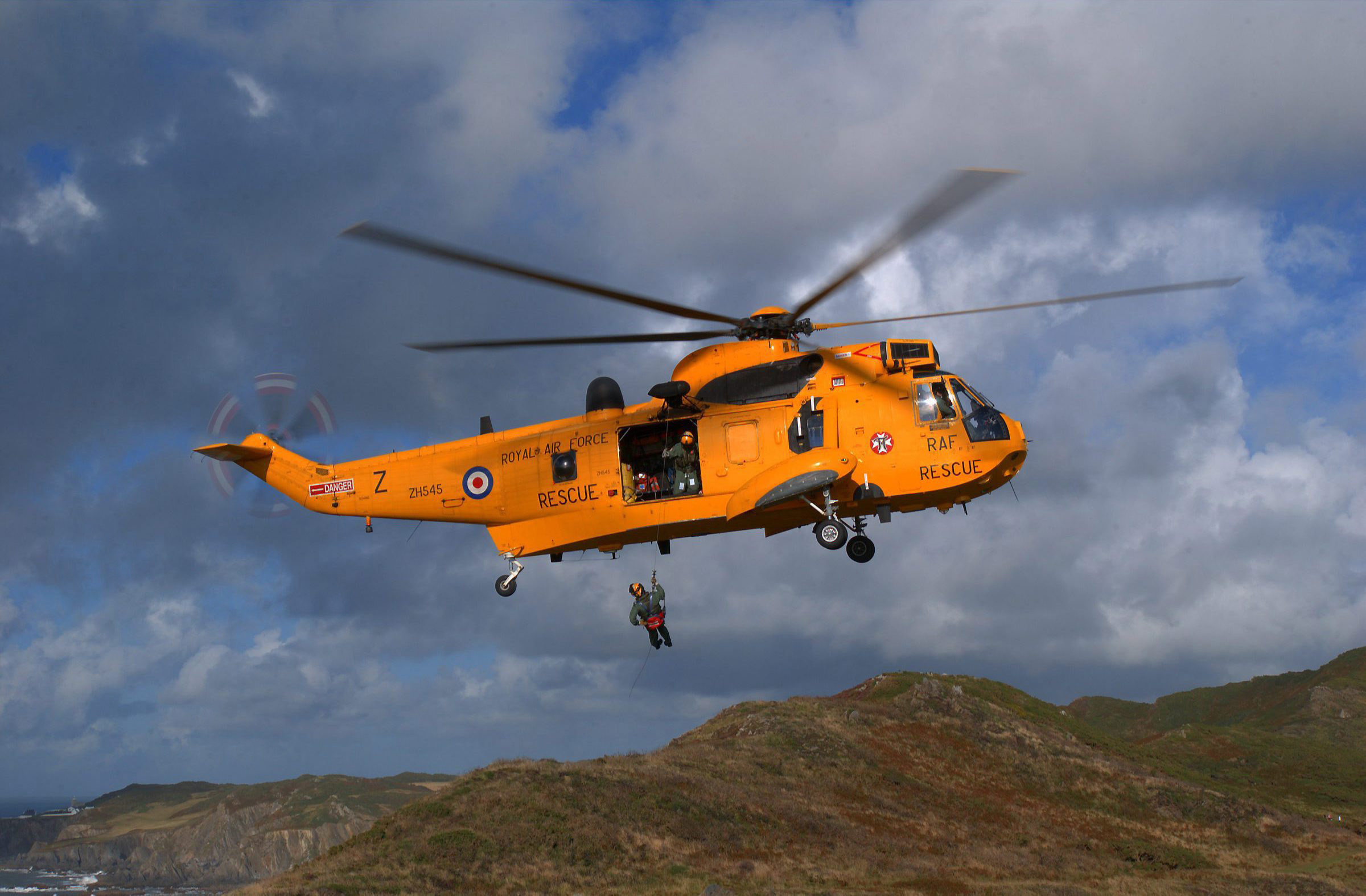
A Westland Sea King HAR3A of No. 22 Squadron's A Flight based at RMB Chivenor in Devon in 2007

The Boscastle flood of 2004 occurred on Monday, 16 August 2004 in the villages of Boscastle and Crackington Haven in Cornwall. The villages suffered extensive damage after flash floods caused by an exceptional amount of rain that fell over the course of eight hours that afternoon. Two Sea Kings from A Flight at RMB Chivenor, callsigns Rescues 169 and 170, were called and help to rescue some of the 100 people who were airlifted out.

Prince William, Duke of Cambridge served in the squadron from 2010 to 2013.

The squadron featured in the BBC television documentary Helicopter Rescue which was broadcast in February 2012.

In July 2015, C Flight stood down with A Flight following on 5 October 2015. The squadron performed military search and rescue until it was handed over to the Maritime & Coastguard Agency and Bristow Helicopters in October 2015.

On 14 May 2020, the Rotary Wing Operational Evaluation and Training Unit was rebadged as No. 22 Squadron, when it reformed at RAF Benson in Oxfordshire. It is the Operational Evaluation Unit for Joint Helicopter Command, which has since been renamed Joint Aviation Command (JAC). It provides testing and evaluation of the all JAC's helicopters including the Boeing Chinook, AgustaWestland Merlin HC4, Boeing AH-64E Apache and AgustaWestland Wildcat AH1 and ensures frontline crews have Qualified Warfare Instructors to support them on operations worldwide.

The squadron retired the Westland Puma HC2 from service in March 2025.

== Heritage ==
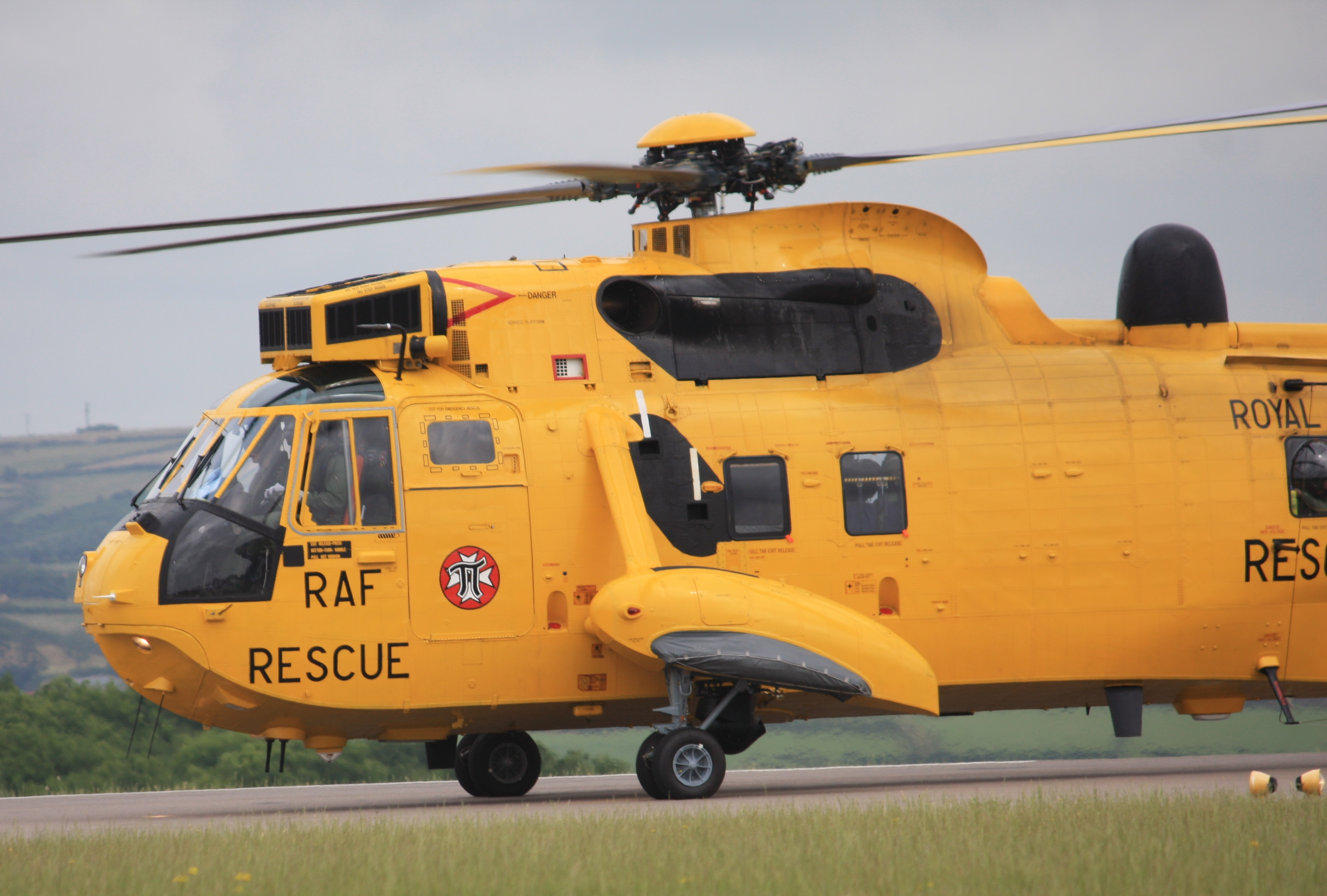
A close-up of a Westland Sea King HAR3A wearing No. 22 Squadron markings

The squadron's badge features on a red roundel (torteaux), a Maltese cross and pi symbol with fimbriation. The Maltese cross denotes where the squadron was based when the badge was authorised by King Edward VIII in May 1936. During this time, it was based with No. 7 Squadron and had to fly over their lines away from the airfield. This is reflected in the badge by the pi symbol, with 22 divided 7 equalling pi (equal to 3.14).

The squadron's motto is Preux et audicieux (French for 'Brave and Audacious').

== Battle honours ==
No. 22 Squadron has received the following battle honours. Those marked with an asterisk (*) may be emblazoned on the squadron standard.

- Western Front (1916–1918)*
- Somme (1916)*
- Ypres (1917)*
- Cambrai (1917)
- Somme (1918)
- Lys (1918)
- Amiens (1918)
- Hindenburg Line*
- Channel and North Sea (1939–1941)*
- France & Low Countries (1940)
- Invasion Ports (1940)
- Biscay Ports (1940–1941)
- Mediterranean (1942)*
- Eastern Waters (1942–1944)*
- Burma (1944–1945)*

== See also ==
- List of Royal Air Force aircraft squadrons
- RAF Search and Rescue Force
