= Ronald Thornely =

English World War I flying ace

Ronald Roscoe Thornely
- Born: 10 June 1889; Cambridge, England
- Died: 21 August 1984 (aged 95)
- Burial place: Putney Vale Cemetery, London
- Military career
- Allegiance: United Kingdom
- Branch: Royal Navy; Royal Air Force
- Service years: 1914–1919
- Rank: Captain
- Units: Royal Naval Armoured Car Division; No. 8 (Naval) Squadron RNAS
- Conflicts: World War I • Gallipoli campaign • Western Front
- Awards: Distinguished Service Cross

Captain Ronald Roscoe Thornely DSC (10 July 1889 – 21 August 1984) was an English World War I flying ace. He was credited with nine aerial victories while flying for the Royal Naval Air Service.

== Early life ==
Thornely was born in Merton Hall, Cambridge, England, the son of Thomas Thornely (1855–1949), a historian, poet and Fellow of Trinity Hall, Cambridge, and his wife Mabel Martha Thornely.

== Military service ==
Thornely was commissioned as a temporary sub-lieutenant in the Royal Naval Volunteer Reserve on 12 December 1914. He served in the Royal Naval Armoured Car Division during the Gallipoli campaign. In May 1916, he transferred to the Royal Naval Air Service, being confirmed as a flight sub-lieutenant on 5 May, and granted Royal Aero Club Aviator's Certificate No. 3290 after soloing a Maurice Farman biplane at the Royal Naval Air Station, Chingford, on 29 July 1916.

He joined No. 8 Squadron RNAS in March 1917, gaining his first aerial victory on 4 June, and then two more before being promoted to flight lieutenant on 30 June. Two more victories followed in July, three in August, and his ninth and last on 11 September.

His award of the Distinguished Service Cross was gazetted on 30 October 1917. His citation read:

Flight Lieutenant Ronald Roscoe Thornley, RNAS.

"For gallantry and skill in aerial combats, notably on the following occasions:
On the 16th June, 1917, whilst on patrol, he attacked a two-seater Aviatik, which fell to the ground, inside our lines.
On the 15th August, 1917, he attacked an Albatross scout and shot it down out of control.
On the 19th August, 1917, he attacked an Aviatik and drove it down out of control.
On the 11th September, 1917, he engaged one of three enemy machines, firing about fifty rounds when quite close, apparently wounding the observer at once, and shortly afterwards the enemy machine fell out of control."

Thornley was promoted to the temporary rank of captain on 7 May 1918. (Note: Such promotion usually accompanied an appointment as flight commander.)

== List of aerial victories ==
Combat record
No.	Date/Time	Aircraft/ Serial No.	Opponent	Result	Location	Notes
1	4 June 1917 @ 0945 hours	Sopwith Triplane (N5465)	German reconnaissance aircraft	Set afire; destroyed	East of Lens	Shared with Flight Sub-Lieutenants Robert Compston and E. A. Bennetts.
2	7 June 1917 @ 1015 hours	Sopwith Triplane (N5465)	Albatros D.V	Driven down out of control	Henin-Liétard	
3	16 June 1917 @ 0830 hours	Undetermined (Note: Sources disagree as to whether Thornely was flying a Triplane or a Camel for his third victory.)	German reconnaissance aircraft	Captured	Loos, east of Lens	Shared with Flight Lieutenant Robert Compston. German pilot KIA, observer WIA.
4	22 July 1917 @ 0630 hours	Sopwith Camel (B3845)	Albatros D.III	Driven down out of control	Southeast of Gavrelle	
5	28 July 1917 @ 0915 hours	Sopwith Camel (B3845)	Albatros D.III	Driven down out of control	Lens–La Bassée	
6	9 August 1917 @ 0915 hours	Sopwith Camel (B3845)	Albatros D.V	Driven down out of control	East of Henin-Liétard	Shared with Flight Sub-Lieutenant William Jordan.
7	15 August 1917 @ 2015 hours	Sopwith Camel (B3845)	Albatros D.III	Driven down out of control	Lens	
8	19 August 1917 @ 0850 hours	Sopwith Camel	German reconnaissance aircraft	Driven down out of control	East of Lens	Shared with Flight Sub-Lieutenants William Jordan, Roderick McDonald, and J. H. Thompson.
9	11 September 1917 @ 1150 hours	Sopwith Camel (B3845)	German reconnaissance aircraft	Driven down out of control	Pont-a-Vendin	

== Post World War I ==
Thornely received a mention in dispatches "for distinguished service in war areas" on 1 January 1919, and was transferred to the unemployed list of the Royal Air Force on 1 March 1919.

On 29 April 1949 Ronald Roscoe Thornely was named as executor of the estates of his parents Thomas and Mabel Martha Thornely, who both died in January 1949.

Thornely died on 21 August 1984, and is buried at Putney Vale Cemetery, London.

== Bibliography ==
- Franks, Norman (2003). Sopwith Camel Aces of World War 1: Volume 52 of Aircraft of the Aces: Volume 52 of Osprey Aircraft of the Aces. Oxford, UK: Osprey Publishing. ISBN 978-1-84176-534-1.
- Shores, Christopher F.; Franks, Norman & Guest, Russell F. (1990). Above the Trenches: a Complete Record of the Fighter Aces and Units of the British Empire Air Forces 1915–1920. London, UK: Grub Street. ISBN 978-0-948817-19-9.
