= Archibald Buchanan =

Archibald Buchanan may refer to:

- Archibald Buchanan (RAF officer) (1892–?), American World War I flying ace
- Archibald Berdmore Buchanan (1823–1883), politician in Queensland, Australia
- Archibald C. Buchanan (1890–1979), Justice of the Supreme Court of Appeals of Virginia
