= Michael Hutterer =

- Born: 17 November 1891; Munich, Kingdom of Bavaria, German Empire
- Died: 21 July 1964 (aged 72); Tutzing, Bavaria, Germany
- Military career
- Allegiance: Germany
- Branch: Aviation
- Rank: Vizefeldwebel
- Unit: Royal Bavarian Jagdstaffel 23
- Awards: Bavarian Military Merit Cross Second Class with Swords, Bavarian Military Merit Cross Third Class, Iron Cross Second and First Class, Bavarian Flying Badge

Vizefeldwebel Michael Hutterer MMC IC was a World War I flying ace credited with eight aerial victories.

Hutterer began over two years in ground units on 4 August 1914. He won his native Bavaria's 3rd Class Military Merit Cross on 24 April 1916. On 25 September 1916, he was promoted to Unteroffizier.

On 2 November 1916, he began pilot's training to gain his Bavarian Flying Badge. On 23 May 1918, he would join Jagdstaffel 23. By war's end, he had shot down eight enemy aircraft, been awarded both classes of the Iron Cross, and received another promotion, to Vizefeldwebel.

Shortly after the Armistice, he would receive another award of the Military Merit Cross, this one Second Class with Swords.

== Biography ==
Michael Hutterer was born in Munich, the Kingdom of Bavaria, the German Empire on 17 November 1891. After schooling, he was a mechanic. As World War I began, he reported for duty in Bavaria's 2nd Machine Gun Company on 4 August 1914. He was later transferred to its 2nd Field Artillery Regiment. On 24 April 1916, he received his native Bavaria's Military Merit Cross Third Class. Hutterer was promoted to Unteroffizier on 25 September 1916. On 2 November 1916, he entered pilot's training at Fliegerersatz-Abteilung (Replacement Detachment) 5 at Gersthofen. On 20 December 1916, Michael Hutterer was awarded the Iron Cross Second Class.

On 28 June 1917, he was promoted to Vizefeldwebel. He was awarded the First Class Iron Cross on 10 July 1917. On 23 July 1917, he received his Bavarian Flying Badge. There is no record of his activities for the next few months, though German policy customarily called for rookie pilots to fly two-seaters while they gained flight and combat experience; this service also served as a sort of audition for single-seat fighters. Michael Hutterer is known to have graduated from Jastaschule I (Fighter school 1) and to have been posted to a fighter squadron, Royal Bavarian Jagdstaffel 23, on 23 May 1918. He staked an unsuccessful claim to destroying a British plane on 31 May 1918, but did not have his first real success until 22 July. From then through 1 November 1918, he shot down seven more enemy planes.

On the evening of 3 September 1918, Hutterer shot down a Sopwith Dolphin of RAF 87 squadron piloted by Canadian 2nd Lt Frank Willard Ferguson of Winnipeg Manitoba, youngest brother of Dr. Robert George Ferguson. His penultimate victory on 30 October was over Archibald Buchanan, an American ace flying in an old Royal Naval Air Service squadron, the former Ten Naval. Hutterer would not score any more victories during the last ten days of World War I.

Shortly after war's end, Michael Hutterer was honored with the Bavarian Military Merit Cross 2nd Class with Swords.

In 1931, he successfully completed his training as a master mechanic (motor vehicle mechanic) in Munich and ran a car repair shop. During the Second World War he served again in the Luftwaffe and was released from military service in May 1944. After the war he worked in an ice cream parlor in his adopted hometown of Starnberg.

Michael Hutterer died in Tutzing, Bavaria on 21 July 1964.
