= Jagdstaffel 16 =

Jasta 16
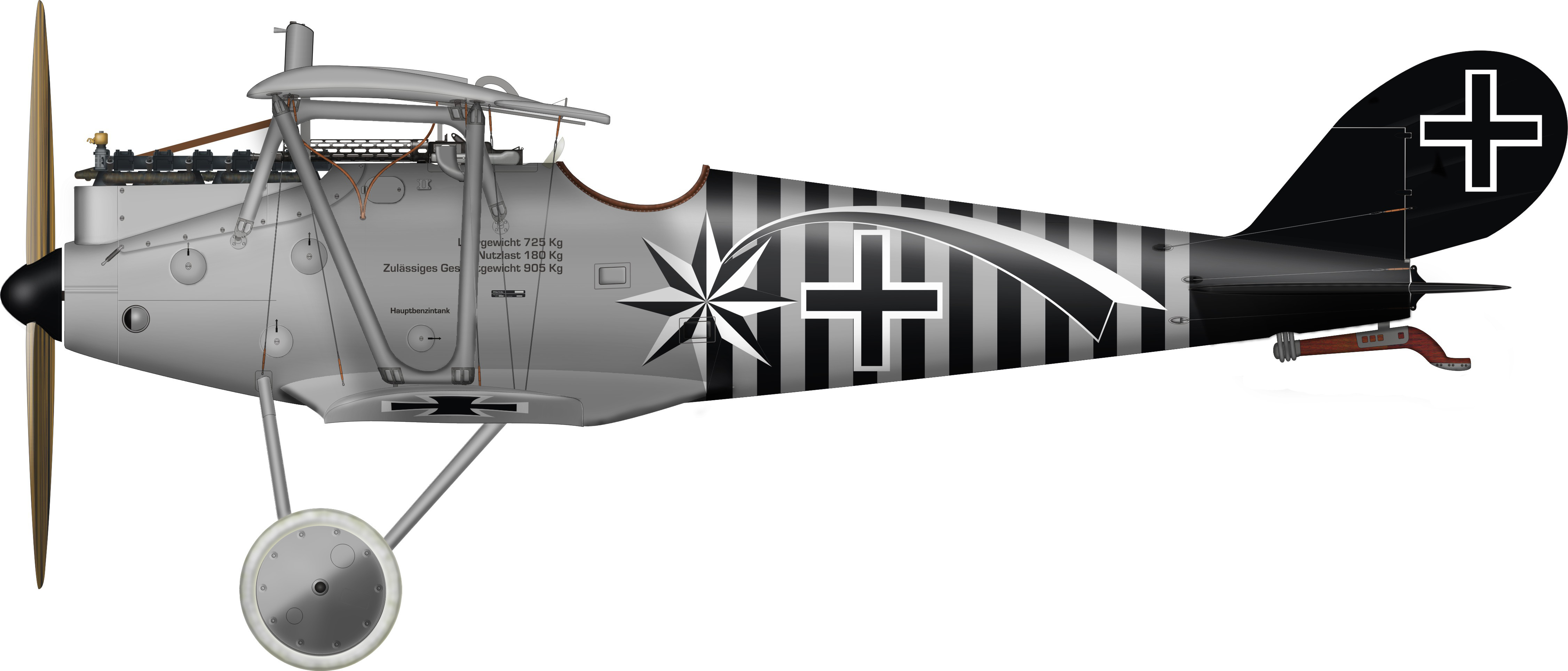
- The Pfalz D.IIIa of Vizefeldwebel Max Holtzem of Jasta 16
- Active: 1916–1918
- Country: German Empire
- Branch: Luftstreitkräfte
- Type: Fighter squadron
- Engagements: World War I

Royal Bavarian Jagdstaffel 16 was a "hunting group" (i.e., fighter squadron) of the Luftstreitkräfte, the air arm of the Imperial German Army during World War I.

== History ==
Royal Bavarian Jagdstaffel 16 was founded from two ad hoc predecessor units — a Bavarian reconnaissance unit, Flieger Abteilung 9, and Kampfeinsitzer-Kommando Ensisheim. These two units were amalgamated on 16 October 1916, while posted in Armee-Abteilung B Sector. Oberleutnant Otto Deßloch commanded this nascent squadron the few days it took to be designated Jagdstaffel 16, on 1 November. By the time it disbanded just two years later, it had established its credentials as a balloon buster squadron, with an even two dozen enemy observation balloons destroyed, as well as 58 victories over enemy aircraft.

== Commanding officers (Staffelführer) ==
1. Paul Kremer: 1 November 1916 – 8 July 1917
2. Heinrich Geigl: 18 July 1917 – 20 August 1917
3. Robert Dycke: 20 August 1917 – 1 December 1917
4. Heinrich Geigl: 1 December 1917 – 4 April 1918
5. Friedrich Ritter von Röth: 8 April 1918 – 9 September 1918
6. Rudolf Eck: 9 September 1918 – October 1918
7. Friedrich Ritter von Röth: October 1918 – 11 November 1918
8. Albert Wilhelm Ferdinand Gröner, 1 November 1916 – 20 July 1917

== Duty stations (airfields) ==
1. Ensisheim: 16 October 1916 – 13 April 1917
2. Habsheim: 13 April 1917 – 6 May 1917
3. Château-Porcien: 7 May 1917 – 4 June 1917
4. Spincourt: 6 June 1917 – 20 October 1917
5. Erlon: 21 October 1917 – 23 November 1917
6. Mercy-le-Haute: 24 November 1917 – 4 February 1918
7. Aertrycke: 7 February 1918 – 14 March 1918
8. Le Cateau: 15 March 1918 – 20 March 1918
9. Foucaucourt: 21 March 1918 – 6 April 1918
10. St. Marguerite: 13 April 1918 – October 1918
11. Scheldewindeke: October 1918 – 11 November 1918

== Notable personnel ==
- Ludwig Hanstein
- Karl Odebrett
- Otto Kissenberth
- Theodor Rumpel

== Aircraft operated ==
- Fokker E.III
- Fokker E.IV
- Fokker D.I
- Fokker D.II
- Pfalz D.II
- Albatros D.III
- Albatros D.V
- Fokker Dr.I
- Fokker D.VII
