= Harold Day (Royal Navy officer) =

British World War I flying ace

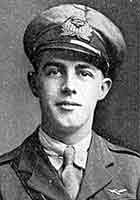
- Born: 17 April 1897; Abergavenny, Wales
- Died: 5 February 1918 (aged 20); Vicinity of Harnes, France
- Burial place: St. Mary's A.D.S Cemetery, Haisnes, Pas de Calais, France
- Military career
- Allegiance: United Kingdom
- Branch: Royal Navy
- Service years: 1917–1918
- Rank: Flight Sub-Lieutenant
- Units: No. 10 Squadron RNAS; No. 8 Squadron RNAS
- Awards: Distinguished Service Cross

Flight Sub-Lieutenant Harold Day DSC (17 April 1897 – 5 February 1918) was a Welsh World War I flying ace credited with 11 confirmed aerial victories.

== World War I ==
Day was the son of William John and Elizabeth Day, of Wernddu, Abergavenny, Monmouthshire. He joined the RNAS as a probationary temporary flight officer, and was commissioned as a temporary flight sub-lieutenant on 30 June 1917.

He first served in No. 10 Naval Squadron, flying a Sopwith Triplane. He scored his first aerial victory with them, sending an Albatros D.V down out of control on 12 August 1917. He was then posted to No. 8 Naval Squadron and flew the Sopwith Camel for his remaining ten victories. During December 1917, he teamed with Guy William Price to drive down DFW two-seater reconnaissance aircraft on three different days. Fighting solo, Day destroyed one enemy aircraft and drove down three others during January 1918. On 2 February 1918, he joined Robert J. O. Compston and three other RNAS pilots in destroying a German reconnaissance aircraft, and in driving down an Albatros D.V later in the day. On 5 February, he joined three other RNAS pilots in destroying a reconnaissance machine; that brought his total to one enemy aircraft destroyed solo, two more shared, and eight driven down out of control. He then dived on another German aircraft. Day's Camel came to pieces during the dive, plummeting him to his death. Günther Schuster of Jasta 29 was credited with the victory.

Day was awarded the Distinguished Service Cross, which was gazetted on 22 February 1918.

He is buried at St. Mary's ADS (Advanced Dressing Station) Cemetery, Haisnes, France.

== Honours and awards ==
Distinguished Service Cross
Flt. Sub-Lieut. Harold Day, R.N.A.S.
In recognition of the skill and determination shown by him in aerial combats, in the course of which he has done much to stop enemy artillery machines from working. On 6 January 1918, he observed a new type enemy aeroplane. He immediately dived to attack, and after a short combat the enemy machine went down very steeply, and was seen to crash. On several other occasions he has brought down enemy machines out of control.
