= Guy William Price =

British flying ace (1895–1918)

- Born: 6 July 1895; Rostrevor, Ireland
- Died: 18 February 1918 (aged 22) near Givenchy-lès-la-Bassée, France
- Burial place: Arras Flying Services Memorial, Pas de Calais, France
- Military career
- Allegiance: United Kingdom
- Branch: Royal Navy
- Service years: 1914–1918
- Rank: Flight Commander
- Nickname: "Captain Kettle"
- Units: Seaplane Defence Flight; No. 8 Squadron RNAS
- Conflicts: First World War • Western Front
- Awards: Distinguished Service Cross & Bar

Flight Commander Guy William Price DSC* (6 July 1895 – 18 February 1918) was an Irish Royal Naval Air Service flying ace during World War I, having 12 confirmed aerial victories. He was awarded the Distinguished Service Cross twice within a 22-day period.

== Family background ==
Price was born in Rostrevor, County Down, Ireland, the son of Frederick Walter Price and Francesca d'Orange (née Rambaut). He lost his father at an early age, since in a 1911 Probate his mother is described as a widow. He later lived in Kingstown, County Dublin, Ireland.

== World War I ==
On 9 December 1914, Flight Sub-Lieutenant Guy William Price RNAS was awarded Royal Aero Club Aviators' Certificate No. 987, earned on a Grahame-White biplane at their school at Hendon Aerodrome.

Price was promoted to flight lieutenant on 28 June 1915, and on 3 July 1917 he was one of the four founder members of the Seaplane Defence Flight (later No. 13 Naval Squadron). This unit, flying Sopwith Pup fighters, was formed at Saint-Pol-sur-Mer to escort unarmed Short reconnaissance seaplanes used in the Dover Strait on anti-submarine patrols.

However, Price would not achieve aerial success until late 1917, when he was posted to No. 8 Naval Squadron as a Sopwith Camel pilot. At 1350 hours on 5 December 1917, he destroyed a German Albatros D.V fighter aircraft. Five minutes later, he helped squadron mate Flight Sub-Lieutenant Wilfred Harry Sneath drive down another Albatros D.V out of control for his second victory. The next day, Price teamed with Flight Sub-Lieutenant Harold Day to drive a DFW two-seater reconnaissance aircraft down out of control. Day and Price replicated this success on both 27 and 28 December, making Price an ace.

He was promoted to flight commander on 1 January 1918, and then next day, scored the first of the six solo victories he would score that month; this particular sortie was mentioned when he was awarded the Distinguished Service Cross. After shooting down in flames an enemy reconnaissance plane on the 6th, he drove down Albatros D.Vs on the 19th and 22nd; the latter win was noted in his second recommendation for the DSC. Price then destroyed another Albatros D.V on the 24th over La Bassée. On 28 January, he incinerated another reconnaissance two-seater in the same locale. Finally, on 16 February 1918, he joined with Canadian ace Herbert Fowler in flaming another German reconnaissance two-seater. Two days later, Price went on a trench strafing mission where Theodor Rumpel of Jasta 23 dove on him and shot him down.

Price's first Distinguished Service Cross was gazetted on 22 February 1918. The Bar in lieu of a second award followed with unusual rapidity, being gazetted on 16 March 1918.

Price, having no known grave, is commemorated at the Arras Flying Services Memorial, Pas de Calais, France.

== Honours and awards ==
Distinguished Service Cross
"In recognition of the gallantry and determination displayed by him in leading offensive patrols, which have constantly engaged and driven away enemy aircraft. On 2 January 1918, he observed seven Albatross scouts, and, crossing the lines in the clouds, he attacked one, which fell vertically, bursting into flames, and crashed to the ground. He has on several other occasions driven enemy aircraft down out of control."

Bar to the Distinguished Service Cross
"For consistency and determination in attacking enemy aircraft, often in superior numbers. On 22 January 1918, when on offensive patrol, he observed seven Albatross scouts. He dived and fired into one of the enemy aircraft, which stalled, side-slipped, and eventually fell over on its back, disappearing through a thick bank of clouds, and was observed by others of our machines to fall completely out of control. On several other occasions he has destroyed enemy machines or brought them down completely out of control."
