= Robert Leith-Macgregor =

British military officer (1917–2008)

- Born: 23 August 1917
- Died: 14 November 2008 (aged 91)
- Military career
- Allegiance: United Kingdom
- Branch: British Army; Royal Air Force
- Service years: 1937–1962
- Rank: Lieutenant Colonel
- Units: Royal Northumberland Fusiliers; No. 241 Squadron RAF; No. 208 Squadron RAF; Nigeria Regiment
- Conflicts: Second World War: North African Campaign; Second Battle of El Alamein; Korean War
- Awards: Military Cross; Distinguished Flying Cross
- Other work: Marketing director

Lieutenant Colonel Robert Leith-Macgregor MC DFC (23 August 1917 – 14 November 2008) was a British Army officer and Royal Air Force pilot. He fought in the Second World War, initially as an infantry officer in the Royal Northumberland Fusiliers, before training as a pilot and transferring to the Royal Air Force. He was shot down several times and eventually became a prisoner of war. Post-war, he returned to the army, serving again with the Royal Northumberland Fusiliers in the Korean War, and later commanding a battalion of that regiment.

== Early life and Second World War ==
The stepson of an admiral, Leith-Macgregor initially trained at the Nautical College, Pangbourne, but could not deal with the five hours of mathematics a day, and after three years transferred to the Royal Military Academy Sandhurst. On passing out, he was commissioned into the Royal Northumberland Fusiliers as a second lieutenant on 25 August 1938, and was posted to the 2nd Battalion. He served in Belgium in 1939, but became bored with serving as a soldier, and instead volunteered to be trained as an army liaison pilot, gaining an additional RAF commission as a pilot officer in the Royal Air Force on 11 April 1940. After training on a de Havilland Tiger Moth, he was taught to fly the Westland Lysander and posted to No. 241 Squadron RAF. He was transferred to No. 208 Squadron RAF to fly the Hawker Hurricane in the North African Campaign, and twice crashed. He was first shot down, but survived unharmed despite his crashed aircraft being strafed by three German fighters before he could escape. On the second occasion, his engine failed and he was forced to crash-land; it later transpired he had taxied 75 yards (69 m) in an active minefield without detonating anything. He had retained his army commission and was promoted lieutenant on 1 January 1941, and in the RAF, war substantive flying officer on 11 April 1941.

In June 1942, he was attacked by four Messerschmitt Bf 109s; he destroyed one, but was himself shot down. Despite again being strafed by the remaining planes, he once again survived unscathed, and returned to his base just in time to find his flight sergeant (who had witnessed events) organising a burial detail. Leith-Macgregor was immediately awarded the Distinguished Flying Cross. The citation was published in the London Gazette on 28 July 1942:

Air Ministry. 28th July, 1942.

ROYAL AIR FORCE.

The KING has been graciously, pleased to approve the following awards in recognition of gallantry displayed in flying operations against the enemy: —

[...]

Distinguished Flying Cross.

[...]

Flight Lieutenant Robert Leith MCGREGOR (43105), No. 298 Squadron.

In June, 1942, whilst on reconnaissance duties near Bir Hacheim, Flight Lieutenant McGregor encountered 4 Messerschmitt 109's which attacked separately. Displaying skilful airmanship he accepted the challenge of each aircraft in turn and destroyed 1. His own aircraft sustained severe damage. With the remaining 3 enemy fighters still pursuing him, he flew towards El Adem where his aircraft crashed in flames. Flight Lieutenant McGregor was uninjured and immediately proceeded to send in his report from the nearest telephone. This officer has displayed high courage and great devotion to duty in the face of the enemy.

He was again shot down in August over El Alamein and was trapped inside the aircraft with the ammunition exploding. Nearby German soldiers broke through the canopy with an axe and helped him escape. After an attempt to escape, he was transferred to an Italian Prisoner of War camp where he was brutally interrogated and held in a cage measuring five feet by three feet. He was transferred to a camp in Gavi and after the Italian armistice sent to Stalag Luft III; he did not escape in The Great Escape but was instead transferred yet again to a naval prisoner of war camp near Hamburg, where a sergeant from the Scots Guards cut the wire and let the prisoners escape.

== Korean War and later life ==
On 26 August 1945, he relinquished his RAF commission to return to army duty as a lieutenant. He rejoined the Fusiliers, was promoted captain on 1 July 1946, and served with the 1st Battalion in the Korean War. While there, he was promoted temporary major, and given command of the battalion's Y Company. For the leadership he displayed on 3 January 1951, he was awarded the Military Cross for placing Y Company so well on a hill that, despite an attack by a massive Chinese force, the enemy were unable to dislodge them, and the company withdrew without a single man killed. Brigadier Brodie, commander of 29th Independent Brigade described it as "a performance of the highest order" when countersigning the recommendation. The award was announced in the London Gazette on 10 July 1951. He received substantive promotion to major on 25 August 1951. He then commanded a company at Eaton Hall Officer Cadet School followed by a spell as second in command of a battalion of the Nigeria Regiment and as training officer of the 7th battalion RNF (the Territorial Army unit associated with the regiment). Promoted lieutenant colonel on 5 February 1960, he commanded the 1st battalion before, aware he had no staff training, he retired on 5 December 1962. In retirement he worked first as a Guinness representative, and later as a marketing director for Rank Hotels and the Park Lane Hotel.
