= No. 208 Squadron RAF =

Defunct flying squadron of the Royal Air Force

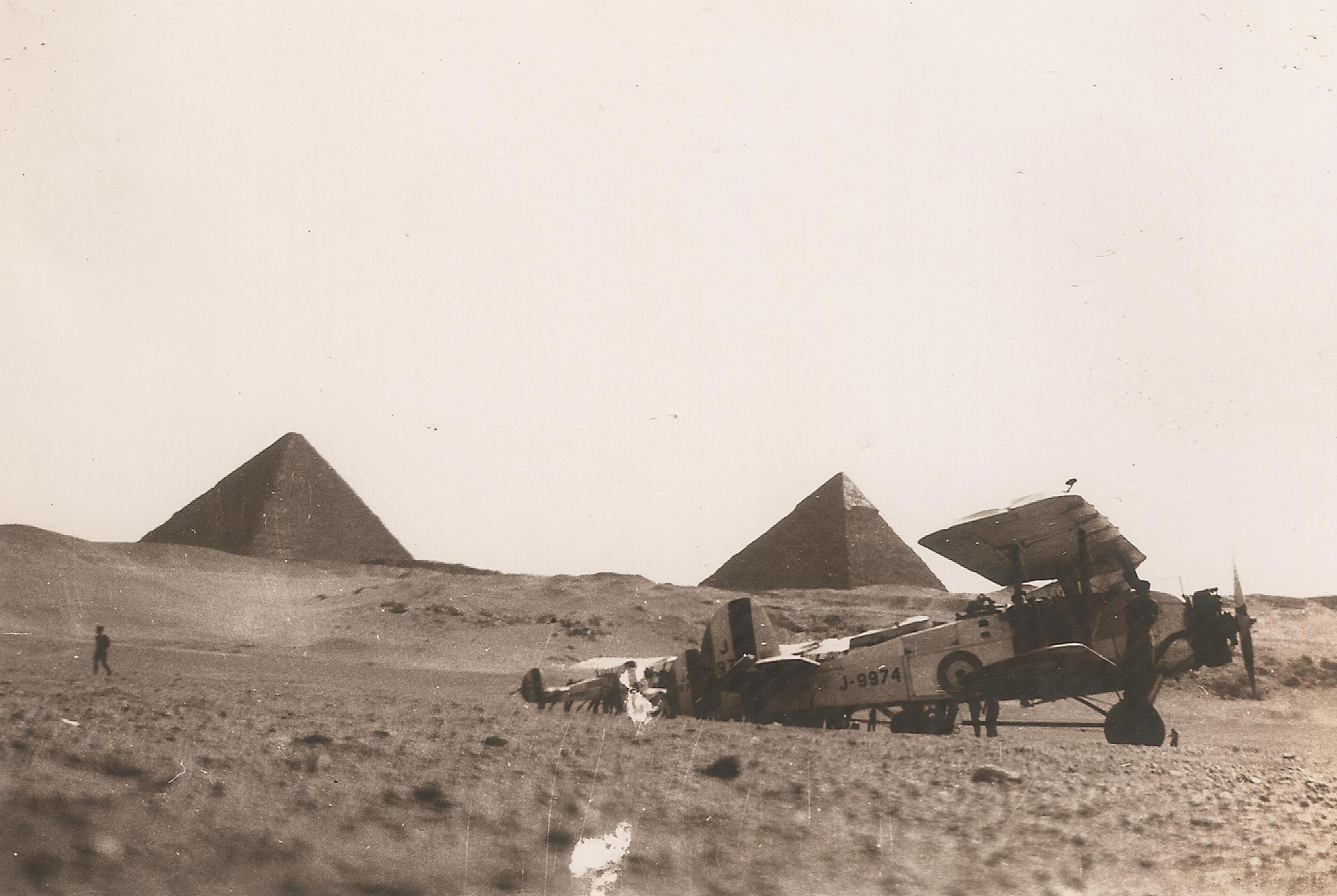
- Armstrong Whitworth Atlas aeroplanes of 208 Squadron RAF in Egypt, circa 1932.
- Active: Royal Naval Air Service; 26 October 1916 – 1 April 1918; Royal Air Force; 1 April 1918 – 7 November 1919; 1 February 1920 - 30 March 1959; 1 April 1959 - 10 September 1971; 1 March 1974 - 31 March 1994; 1 April 1994 -13 April 2016
- Country: United Kingdom
- Branch: Royal Air Force
- Role: Advanced flying training Instructor training Conversion training
- Station: RAF Valley
- Nickname: The Flying Shuftis
- Motto: Vigilant
- Aircraft: BAe Hawk
- Battle honours: Western Front 1915-1918*; Arras*; Ypres 1917*; Lys; Somme 1918*; Egypt and Libya 1940-1942*; Greece 1941*; Iraq 1941; Syria 1941; El Alamein*; Italy 1944-1945*; Gustav Line; Gothic Line; Gulf 1991*; Honours marked with an asterisk* are those emblazoned on the Squadron Standard

Commanders
- Notable commanders: Geoffrey Rhodes Bromet

Insignia
- Squadron Badge heraldry: A sphinx affrontée proper The Gizah Sphinx commemorated the Squadron's long association with Egypt during the inter-war years. An unofficial 'winged eye' badge had been in use from July 1930 until 1937.
- Squadron roundel
- Squadron Codes: GA (Apr 1939 - Sep 1939); RG (Mar 1944 - 1949); S (Carried on Buccaneers); D (1994 - present)

No 208 (Reserve) Squadron was a reserve unit of the Royal Air Force, most recently based at RAF Valley, Anglesey, Wales. It operated the BAe Hawk aircraft, as a part of No. 4 Flying Training School. Due to obsolescence of its Hawk T.1 aircraft compared to the new-build Hawk T.2 aircraft of its sister unit, 4(R) Sqn, the squadron was disbanded in April 2016, in its 100th year of operations.

== History ==
=== First World War ===
The squadron was established as part of the Royal Naval Air Service on 25 October 1916 at Dunkirk as No. 8 (Naval) Squadron. In its early days, the unit flew Sopwith Pups, 1½ Strutters and Nieuport Scouts. Later in the First World War it re-equipped with Sopwith Camels and was assigned to artillery spotting. The squadron returned to the UK briefly before being sent back to France to face the German offensive. While in France sixteen Camels belonging to the squadron were destroyed by the RAF to prevent the Germans capturing them during their advance. When the Royal Air Force was formed on 1 April 1918, the unit was renumbered to No. 208 Squadron RAF. After the war ended, 208 Squadron remained with the occupying forces until August 1919, when it again returned to the UK for disbandment on 7 November 1919 at Netheravon. For some time the squadron was based at the aerodrome at the Beaupré-sur-la-Lys Abbey in La Gorgue in northern France.

During the war, the squadron claimed 298 victories. Twenty-five aces had served in the squadron. Notable among them were Anthony Arnold, Charles Dawson Booker, Robert J. O. Compston, Harold Day, Stanley Goble, Edward Grahame Johnstone, William Lancelot Jordan, Robert A. Little, William E. G. Mann, Richard Munday, Guy William Price, George Simpson, Reginald Soar, Ronald Thornley, Sir Herbert Thompson and James White.

=== Interbellum ===
The squadron re-formed at RAF Ismailia in Egypt on 1 February 1920 by the renumbering of No. 113 Squadron RAF. It was at first equipped with RE8s and from November 1920 till May 1930 with Bristol Fighters. In September 1922 the squadron was sent to Turkey for a year during the Chanak crisis, being stationed at San Stefano, a part of the Bakırköy district of Istanbul. After the conflict, 208 Squadron went back to Egypt and in 1930 received Armstrong Whitworth Atlas aircraft to replace the old Bristol fighters. The Atlases in their turn were replaced five years later by Audaxes and for one flight by Demons. Just before the outbreak of the Second World War, in January 1939, these gave way for the Westland Lysander.

=== Second World War ===
No. 208 Squadron was still stationed in Egypt at the outbreak of the Second World War. It joined the war effort in mid-1940, flying Westland Lysander reconnaissance aircraft and Hawker Hurricane fighters on army co-operation duties in the North African campaign and the Greek Campaign of 1941. During the war it included a significant number of Royal Australian Air Force and South African Air Force personnel, along with other nationalities. Amongst the members of the squadron at this time was Robert Leith-Macgregor, shot down on more than one occasion, once ending up taxiing through a minefield, but managing not to trigger any mines.

The unit was later stationed in Palestine, before returning to North Africa. It briefly converted to Curtiss Tomahawks, but received Supermarine Spitfires in late 1943 and flew them for the remainder of the war. From 1944, it took part in the Italian campaign.

=== After the Second World War ===
Shortly after the war, 208 Squadron moved back to Palestine where it was involved in operations against the Egyptian Air Force. In 1948, the squadron moved to the Egyptian Canal Zone. It saw action in the 1948 Arab–Israeli War, losing four Spitfires in combat with Israeli Air Force aircraft (which also included Spitfires) on 7 January 1949. Of the four pilots, one (Ronald Sayers) was killed; a second baled out, was picked up by Bedouins and returned to his base; two other pilots were captured by Israel and released.

The last officially recorded "air to air fighter pilot kill" (bullets only, without guidance systems) occurred on 22 May 1948. At 09:30 two Egyptian Spitfire LF.9s staged a third attack on Ramat David. This time Fg Off Tim McElhaw and Fg Off Hully of 208 Squadron had taken over the standing patrol. Fg Off McElhaw, flying Spitfire FR.18 TZ228, intercepted and shot down both LF.9s.

In 1951, the squadron relocated to RAF Fayid where its Spitfires were replaced with Gloster Meteor jets. From there it moved to RAF Abu Sueir, relocating to RAF Ta Kali, Malta, in August 1956, with interim spells earlier in the year at RAF Hal Far, Malta, and RAF Akrotiri, Cyprus. It disbanded at Ta Kali in January 1958, but re-formed the same month in the UK at RAF Tangmere from a nucleus of No. 34 Squadron RAF. In March 1958, re-equipped with Hunter F.6's, it returned to the Middle East, based at RAF Nicosia, with detachments to RAF Akrotiri and Amman, Jordan. The squadron disbanded at RAF Nicosia on 31 March 1959.

The next day, 1 April 1959, it re-formed at RAF Eastleigh, Nairobi, Kenya, by the re-numbering of No. 142 Squadron RAF under Squadron Leader R. Ramirez. It operated from Eastleigh from April 1959 to March 1960, being redeployed home to RAF Stradishall from March to June 1960, but returning to Eastleigh in June, sending detachments to Kuwait and Bahrain during the period. It was moved to RAF Khormaksar in Aden in November 1961, under Air Forces Arabian Peninsula, which became Air Forces Middle East the same year. In June 1964 it moved to Muharraq in Bahrain. The squadron remained in the Middle East until September 1971 when it was disbanded as a consequence of British drawdown of armed forces from East of Suez.

=== Flying Buccaneers ===
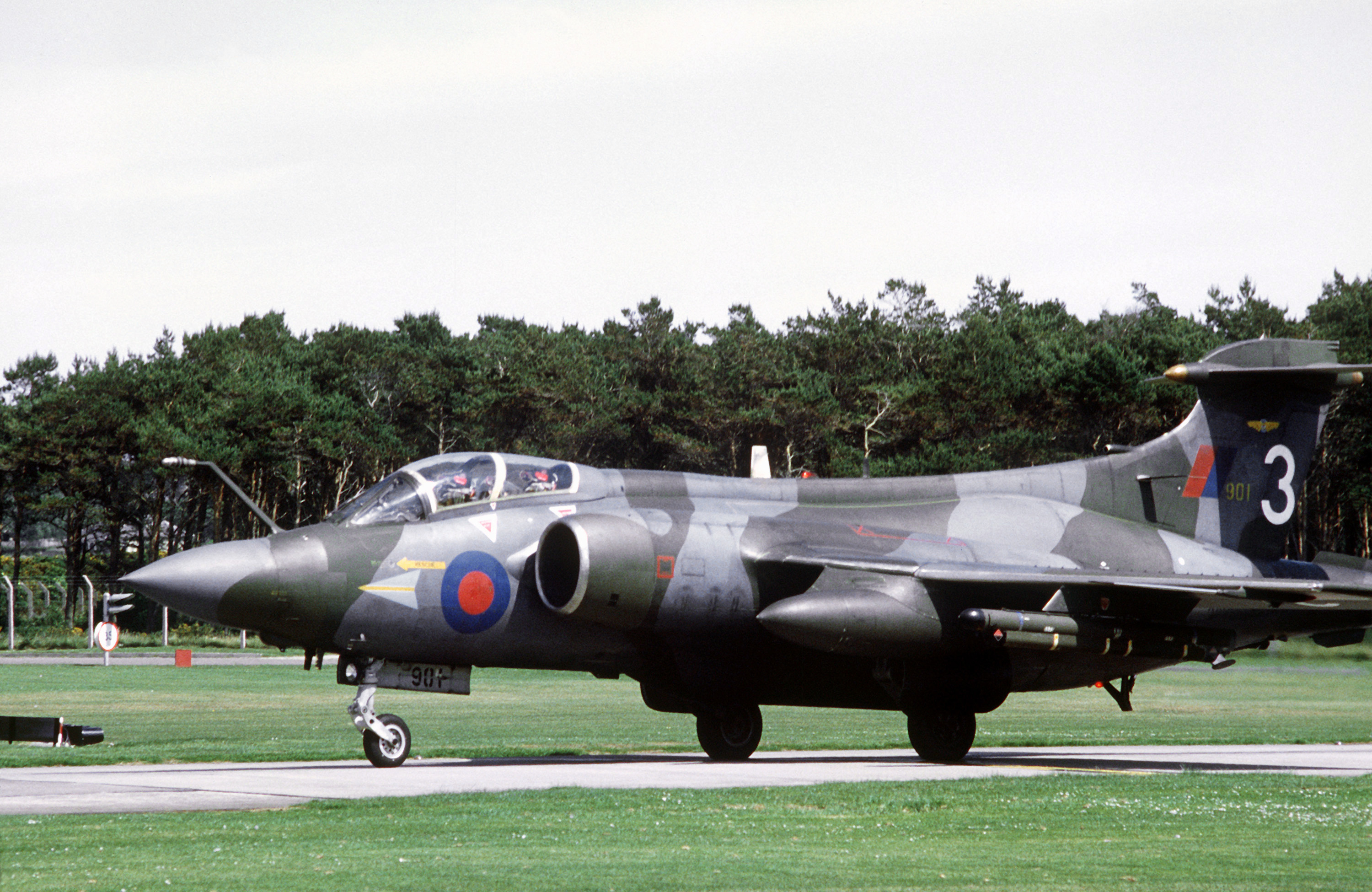
A 208 Sqn. RAF Buccaneer S.2B in 1981. Wrap-around camouflage was applied, as it would often be observed manoeuvring at low level

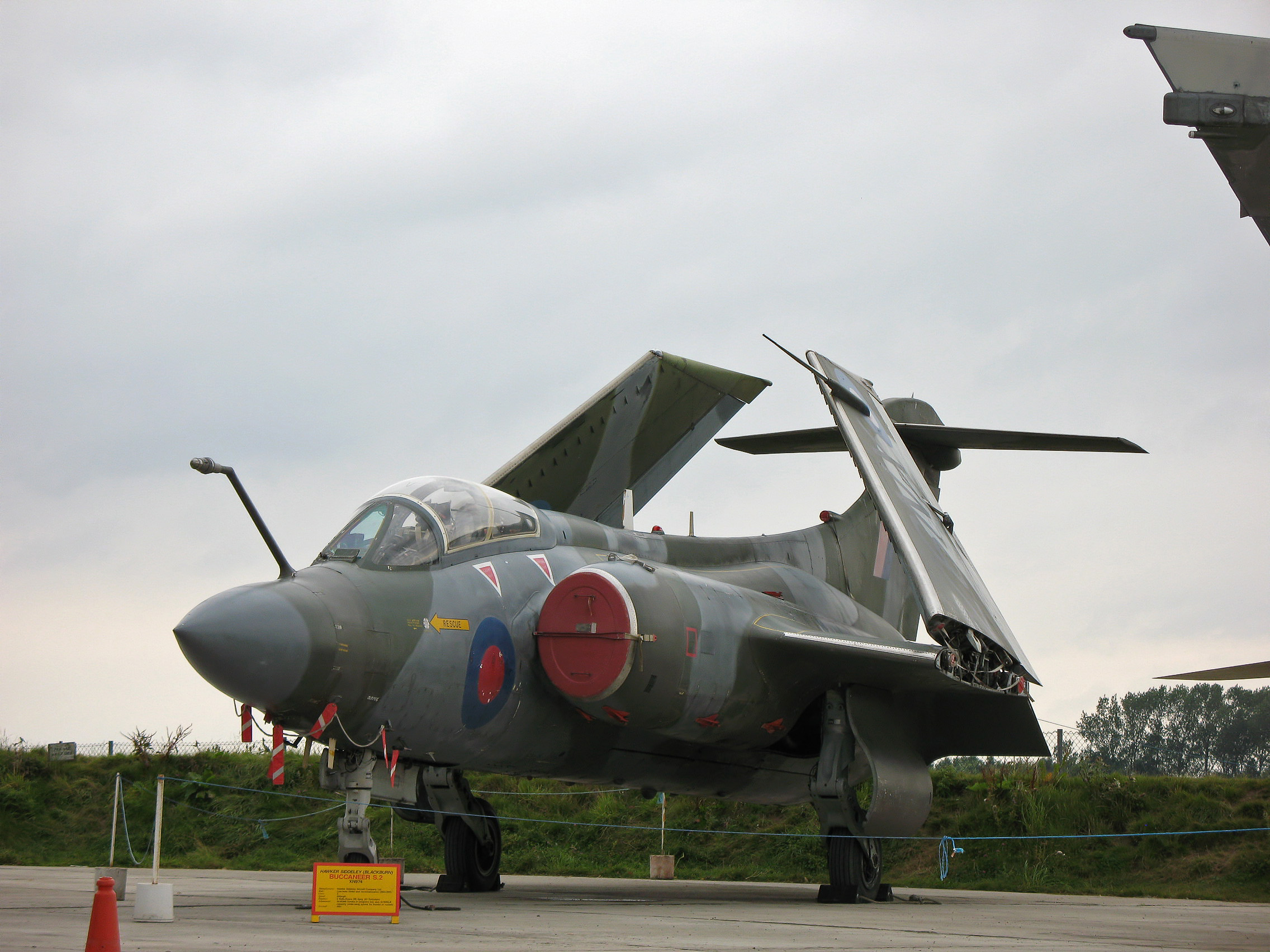
RAF Buccaneer S.2 with wings folded

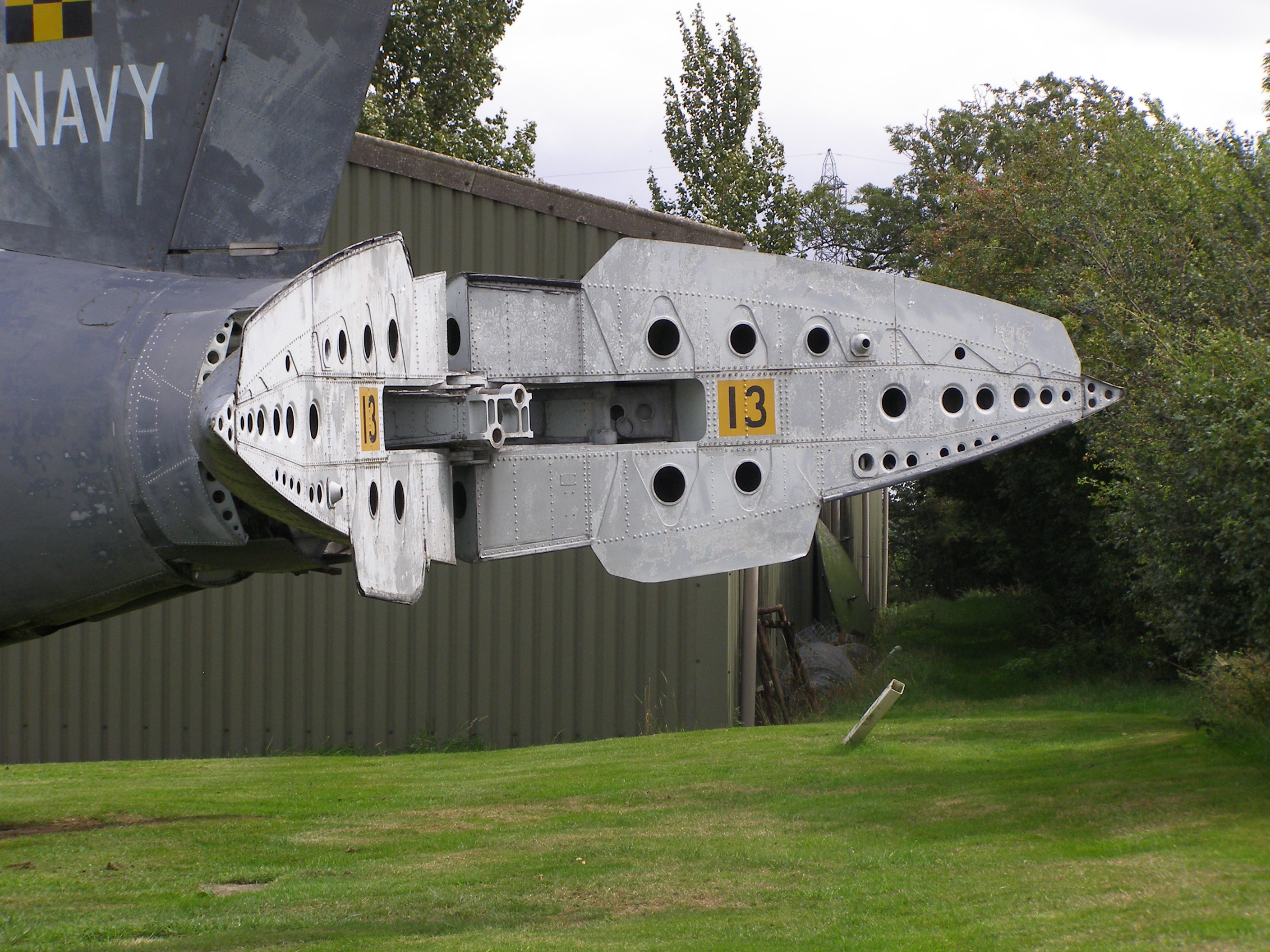
Buccaneer airbrake detail

208 Squadron re-formed at RAF Honington in 1974 with Blackburn Buccaneer S.2s, assigned to SACEUR in a low-level strike role. The squadron's twelve Buccaneers were declared operational to SACEUR from 1975 armed with 24 WE.177 nuclear weapons. The squadron was tasked with supporting land forces resisting an advance by the Warsaw Pact into western Europe, by striking at enemy forces, logistics and infrastructure beyond the forward edge of the battlefield, initially with conventional munitions, and with nuclear weapons in the event of escalation. The allocation of the British-owned WE.177 weapon freed the squadron from the time-consuming burden, at a critical time, of using US-owned nuclear weapons held in US custody at a central location. The squadron continued in this role, based at RAF Honington, until late 1983, when it moved base to RAF Lossiemouth and was reassigned to SACLANT for maritime strike duties.

At Lossiemouth it flew alongside No. 12 Squadron RAF with the same role. The squadron's allocation of WE.177 nuclear weapons was reduced to twelve, one per aircraft, although the Buccaneer was able to carry two in its internal bomb bay. The squadron continued in this role until late 1993 when it relinquished its nuclear weapons. The unit was one of the last squadrons to operate the Buccaneer before it went out of service in 1994 and after the type's retirement the squadron disbanded again on 31 March 1994. Between 1 October 1991 and November 1992, the Buccaneer Training Flight was formed as part of 208 Squadron at RAF Lossiemouth and operated the S.2B variant and some Hawker Hunter T.7s.

=== Transition to Hawk ===
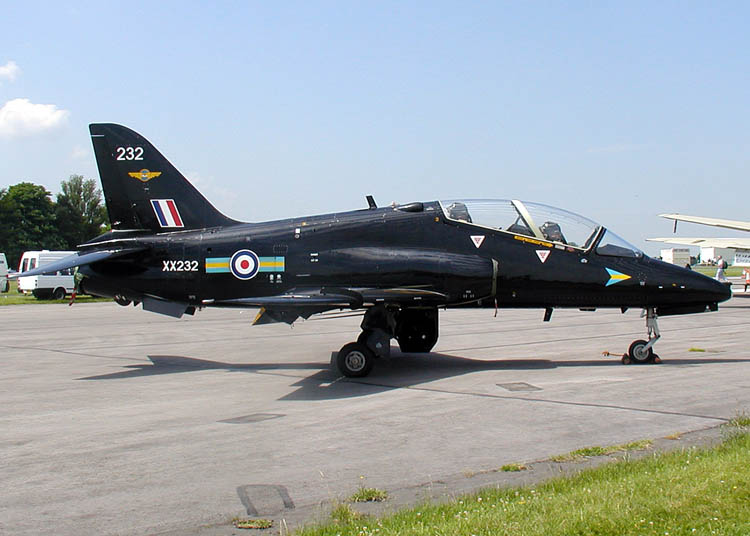
BAe Hawk of No. 208 Squadron

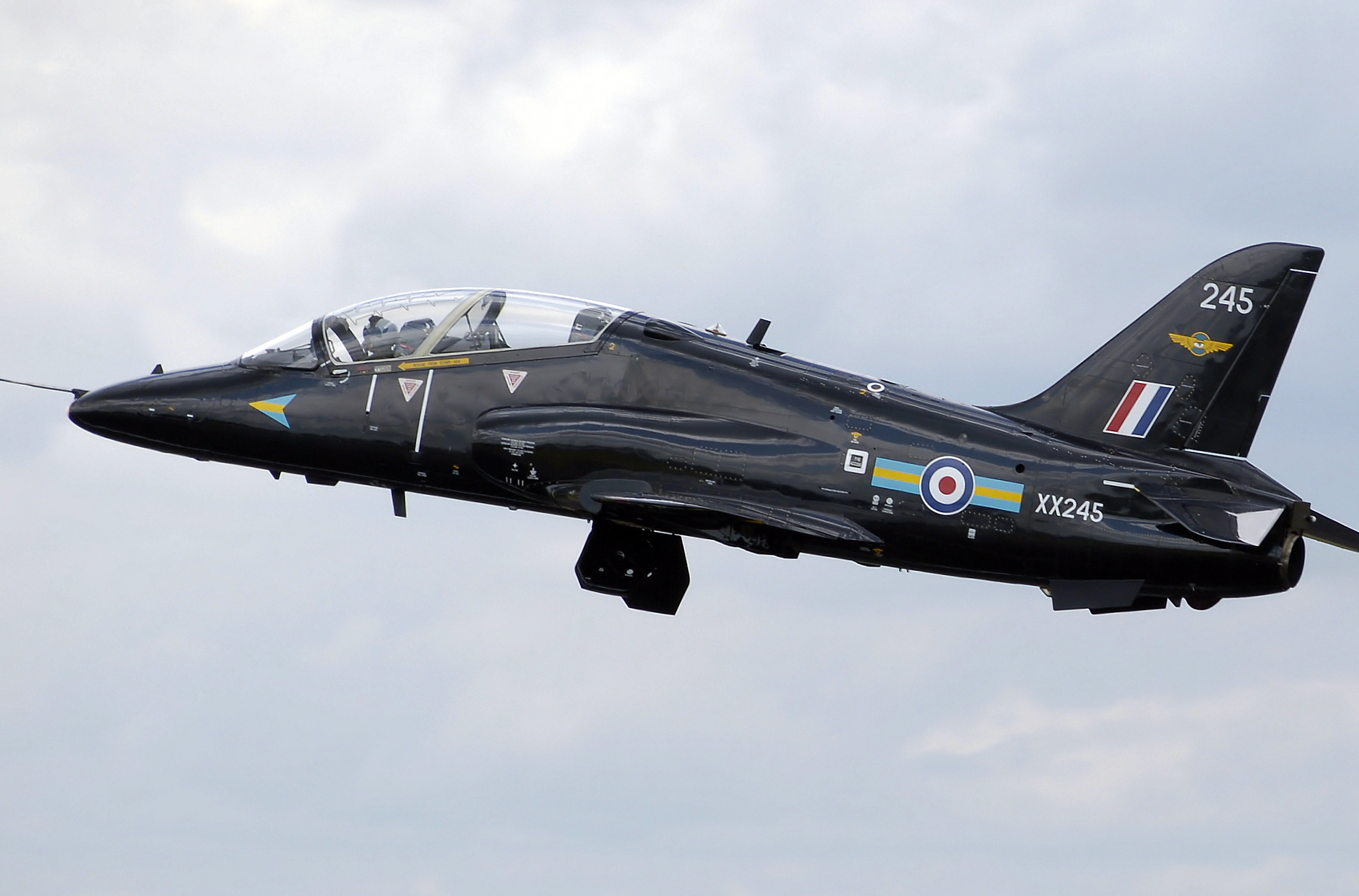
BAe Hawk of No. 208 Squadron in flight

208 Squadron re-formed again on 1 April 1994 from 234 (Reserve) Squadron, attached to No. 4 Flying Training School RAF. It moved to RAF Valley operating the BAe Hawk. The School was made up of two squadrons: 208 Squadron with the Hawk T Mk1 and No. 4(R) Squadron with the Hawk T Mk2. Both squadrons provided Advanced Jet Flying Training and Tactical Weapons Training to prepare pilots for the front line on either the Tornado or Typhoon. 208(R) Squadron's Hawk tasks included:

Advanced flying and tactical weapons training

- To train RAF, RN and some foreign ab-initio pilots to Operation Conversion Unit (OCU) entry standard.
- To re-train RAF and RN multi-engine and rotary pilots to OCU entry standard.
- To refresh Shorts Tucano QFIs to OCU entry standard.

Instructor training

- To train Hawk QFIs to B2 standard in accordance with the current Central Flying School (CFS) syllabuses.
- To upgrade Hawk QFIs to B1, A2 and A1 standard in accordance with 208(R) Squadron staff training requirements and CFS syllabuses.
- To train Hawk IREs in accordance with the current CFS syllabuses.
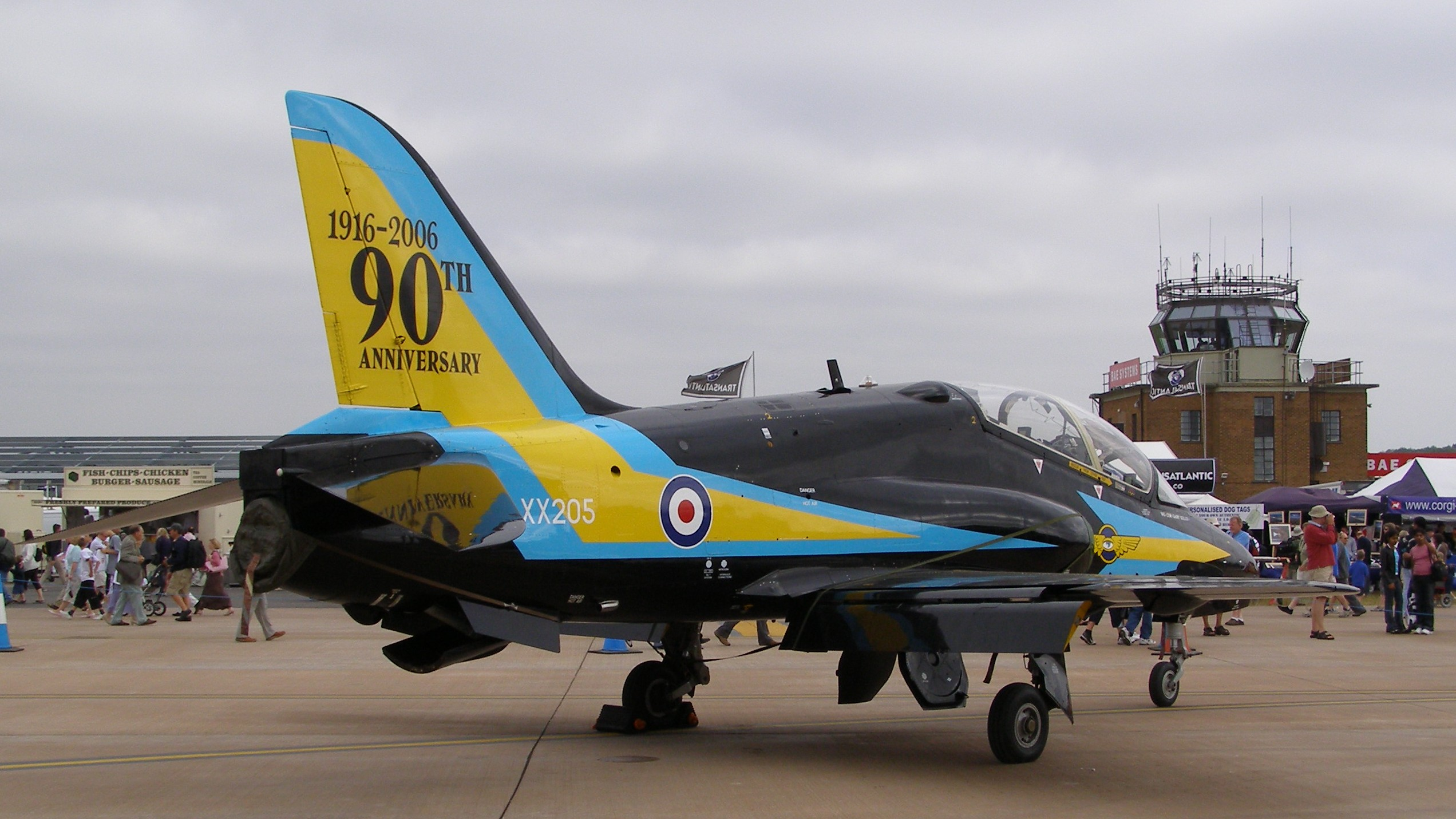
  A Hawk painted to commemorate the 90th Anniversary of the Squadron in 2006

Conversion training

- To provide a common conversion course for all qualified pilots re-roling to the Hawk.
- To provide United Kingdom Orientation training for Foreign and Commonwealth pilots destined for fast-jet appointments.
- To provide conversion training for pilots destined for the Royal Air Force Aerobatics Team.

Incidents and accidents

On 20 April 2007, a BAE Hawk from the squadron crashed near RAF Mona. The pilot was taken to hospital and discharged soon after. The accident was caused by a solo student stalling the aircraft on an overshoot.

=== Centenary and disbandment ===
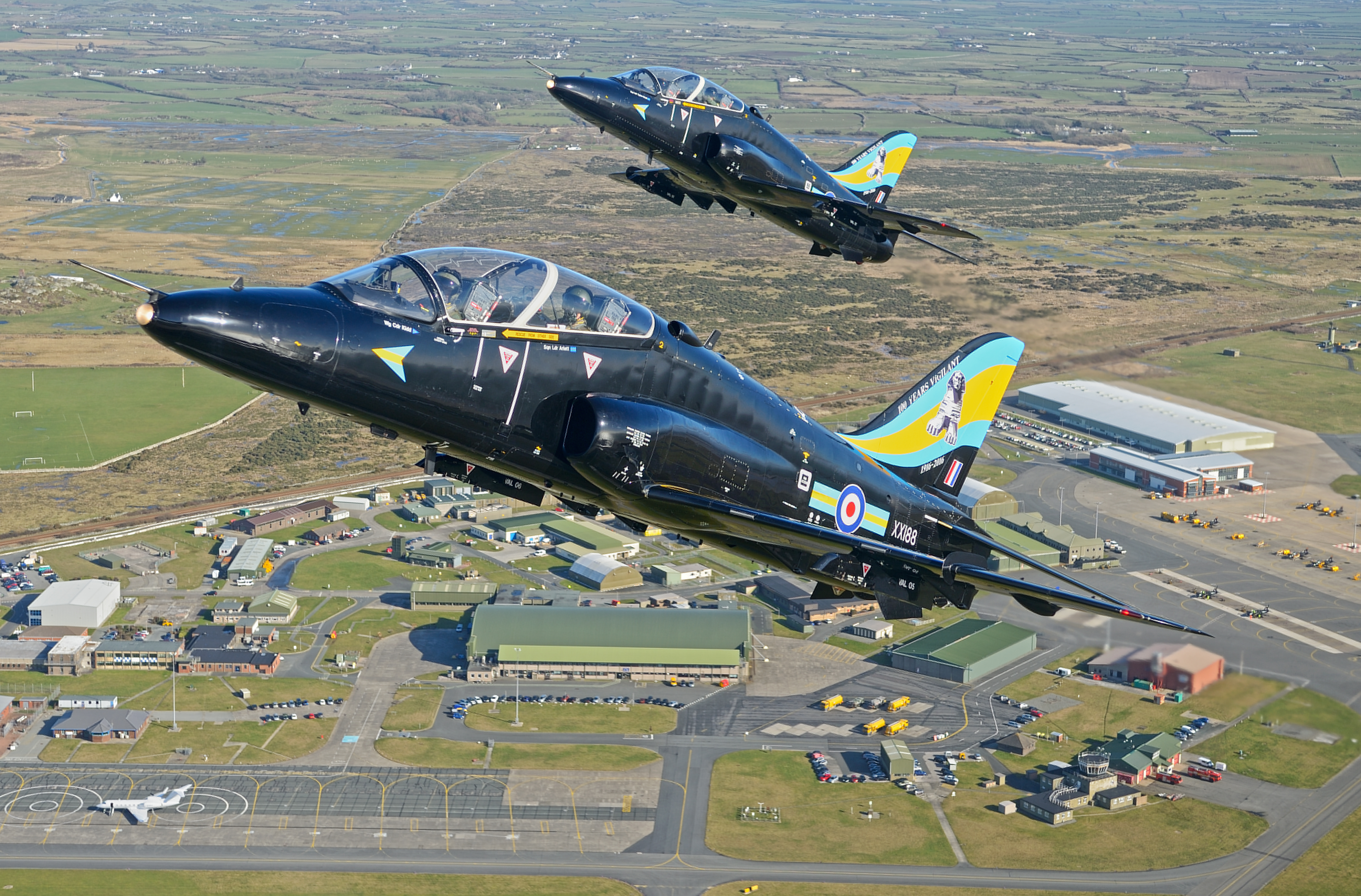
XX188 and XX256 Centenary Photoshoot

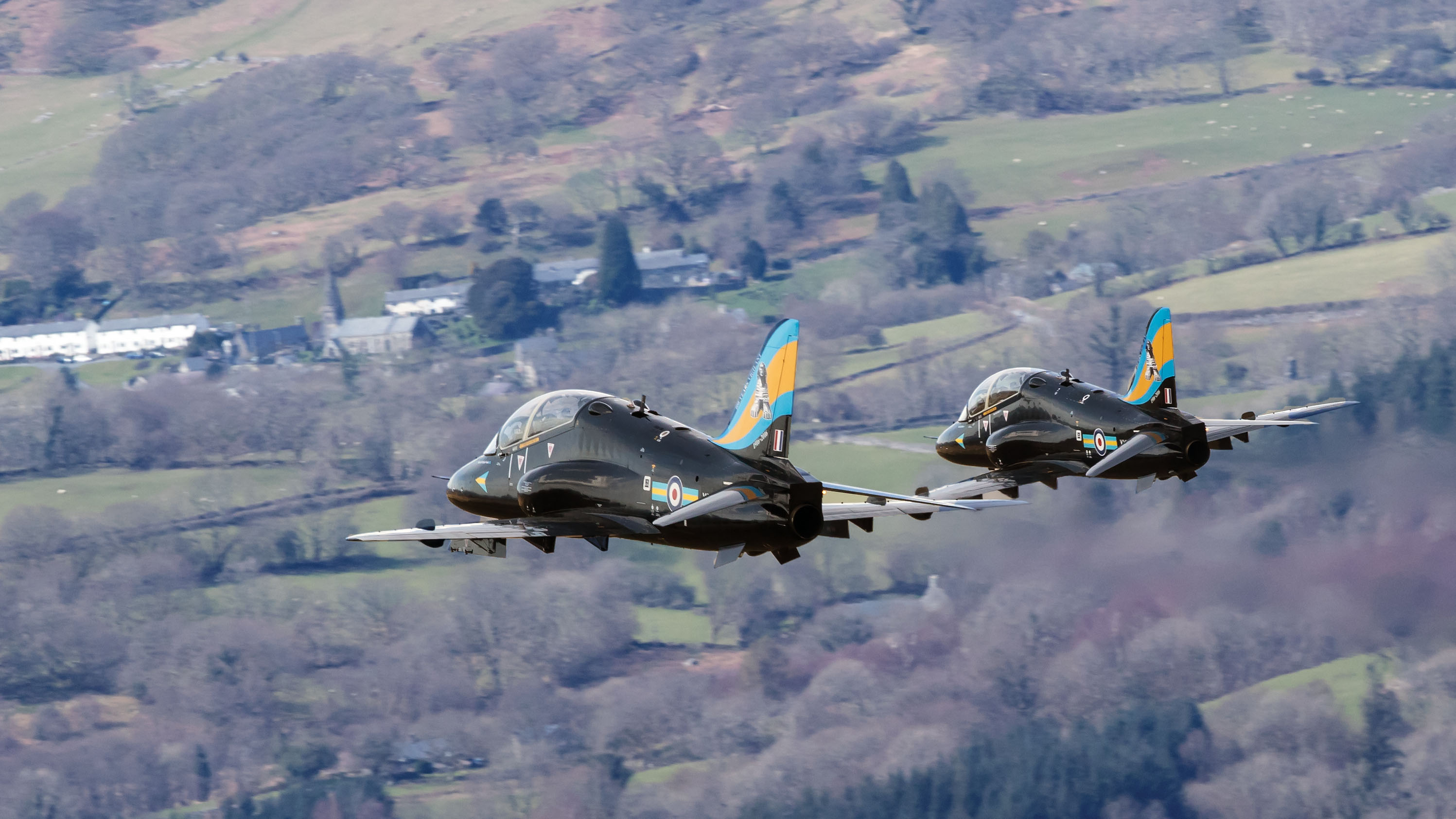
208(R) Sqn Hawks XX188 and XX256 on their last flight, 13 April 2016

Despite conducting parallel training alongside the advanced Hawk TMk2 aircraft of 4(R) Squadron for several years, once 4(R) Squadron reached full output capacity, in January 2016 the Royal Air Force took a decision to disband 208(R) Squadron. The Squadron celebrated its centenary on 1 April 2016 with the final student course graduation, a families' day and a formal dinner. Shortly afterwards the Squadron disbanded, making its last flight on 13 April 2016 where three aircraft (two in centenary markings) led by OC 208(R) Squadron and the RAF Valley Station Commander overflew several landmarks linked with the Hawk TMk1. When it was handed back, it was estimated that over 1000 student pilots had been trained in the 208(R) Squadron building during its 22-year tenure at RAF Valley. The Squadron Standard was lodged in the RAF church, St Clement Danes, at a ceremony on 22 May 2016, attended by squadron personnel, members of the 208 Squadron Association, Air Officer Commanding 22(Trg) Group and the Director of Flying Training.

== Squadron badge ==
The original badge adorned by the aircraft was designed by one of the aircrew and featured the Eye of Horus with wings either side. This was said to have been approved locally and by Middle-East Command, as all the 208 Squadron aircraft were emblazoned with the design. However, when the badge went up for approval by the Chester Herald as part of the heraldic badge approval process, the design was disallowed as the Eye of Horus had connotations of evil spirits so a newer design with the Sphinx in the background was approved instead. The Arabic phrase to look is pronounced shouf, which became shufti, and this lent itself to the squadron's nickname of the Flying Shuftis.

== Aircraft operated ==
Aircraft operated by No. 8 Squadron RNAS and no. 208 Squadron RAF
From	To	Aircraft	Variant	From	To	Aircraft	Variant
October 1916	November 1916	Sopwith 1½ Strutter		May 1942	September 1942	Curtiss Tomahawk	Mk IIb
October 1916	December 1916	Nieuport Scout		May 1942	December 1943	Hawker Hurricane	Mks. Ia, IIb, IIc
October 1916	February 1917	Sopwith Pup		December 1943	July 1944	Supermarine Spitfire	Mk Vc
February 1917	September 1917	Sopwith Triplane		March 1944	June 1947	Supermarine Spitfire	Mk IX
September 1917	November 1918	Sopwith Camel		August 1944	October 1944	Supermarine Spitfire	Mk VIII
November 1918	September 1919	Sopwith Snipe		August 1946	March 1957	Supermarine Spitfire	FR.18
February 1920	November 1920	Royal Aircraft Factory RE8		March 1951	January 1958	Gloster Meteor	FR.9
November 1920	May 1930	Bristol F2 Fighter	F2b	January 1958	February 1958	Hawker Hunter	F.5
May 1930	August 1935	Armstrong Whitworth Atlas		January 1958	March 1959	Hawker Hunter	F.6
August 1935	January 1939	Hawker Audax		April 1959	March 1960	de Havilland Venom	FB.4
September 1935	March 1936	Hawker Demon		March 1960	September 1971	Hawker Hunter	FGA.9
January 1939	May 1942	Westland Lysander	Mrs I, II	October 1974	March 1994	Blackburn Buccaneer	S.2A, S.2B
November 1940	September 1942	Hawker Hurricane	Mk I	April 1994	April 2016	BAe Hawk	T1, T1A
May 1941	June 1941	Hawker Audax					

== Commanding Officers ==
Name	Commenced	Name	Commenced
Squadron Commander G R Bromet, DSO	25 October 1916	Squadron Leader R Ramirez	1 April 1959
Squadron Commander C Draper, DSC	28 October 1917	Squadron Leader M Goodfellow	1 April 1961
Major H G Smart	14 January 1919	Squadron Leader G N Lewis, AFC	7 March 1963
Squadron leader W J Guilfoyle, OBE, MC	1 February 1920	Squadron Leader D J Rhodes, AFM	1 April 1965
Squadron Leader A ap Ellis	17 February 1922	Squadron Leader A J Chaplin	8 January 1966
Wing Commander A C Winter	14 November 1923	Squadron Leader C Taylor AFC	1 June 1968
Squadron Leader H M Probyn	8 March 1924	Squadron Leader G E Ord	25 May 1970
Squadron Leader A S C MacLaren, OBE, NC, DFC, AFC	12 December 1925	Squadron Leader I C H Dick, AFC	25 May 1971
Squadron Leader V S E Lindop	14 March 1927	Wing Commander P F Rogers	1 July 1974
Squadron Leader M Moore, OBE	14 April 1930	Wing Commander P G Pinney MVO	27 November 1976
Squadron Leader J Whitworth-Jones	29 April 1933	Wing Commander G R Pitchfork, MBE, BA, FRAeS	15 June 1979
Squadron Leader A H Flower	1 November 1934	Wing Commander B C Laite	4 December 1981
Squadron Leader W A D Brook	2 February 1936	Wing Commander J A F Ford	6 July 1984
Squadron Leader G N J Stanley-Turner	2 December 1938	Wing Commander B S Mahaffey, BA	6 March 1987
Squadron Leader R A Sprague	10 April 1940	Wing Commander A W Cope, MBE, AFC	9 September 1989
Squadron Leader J R Wilson	16 December 1940	Wing Commander N M Huckins, MBE, BSc	27 March 1992
Squadron Leader L G Burnand, DFC	6 October 1941	Squadron Leader G Brough	4 April 1994
Wing Commander J K Rogers	23 June 1942	Squadron Leader M P Christy	25 September 1996
Wing Commander M A Johnson, DFC	12 September 1942	Squadron Leader P K Comer	27 March 1998
Wing Commander E P H Wheller	21 September 1943	Squadron Leader S C Stocker BSc	11 September 2000
Lieutenant Colonel J P D Blaauw, DFC	23 January 1944	Wing Commander N Meadows, MA, BSc, MRAeS	5 March 2001
Wing Commander J B A Fleming, OBE	10 March 1945	Wing Commander N Clifford MA LLB	9 September 2003
Squadron Leader J F Norton, DFC	22 October 1945	Wing Commander G S Kelly BSc	20 March 2005
Squadron Leader R T Llewellyn, DFM	28 February 1946	Squadron Leader M A Simmonds BEng	10 April 2008
Squadron Leader F J Roder	26 June 1946	Wing Commander J H Hunter MA BSc	19 June 2008
Squadron Leader C F Ambrose, DFC	15 May 1947	Squadron Leader A V Dow	19 July 2010
Squadron Leader J M Morgan, DFC	8 July 1948	Wing Commander E P Moriarty	6 October 2010
Squadron Leader F V Morello	4 November 1950	Squadron Leader P K Harrison	15 October 2012
Squadron Leader T F Neil	24 May 1953	Wing Commander N J Gatenby BSc	3 December 2012
Squadron Leader J N Thorne	10 November 1955	Wing Commander C R Kidd BEng	1 May 2015
Squadron Leader J H Granville-White	21 March 1958	Disbanded	22 May 2016
