= Otto Kissenberth =

- Sanke postcard #595, showing Otto Kissenberth
- Born: 26 February 1893; Landshut, Kingdom of Bavaria, German Empire
- Died: 2 August 1919 (aged 26); Bavarian Alps
- Military career
- Allegiance: German Empire
- Branch: Luftstreitkräfte
- Service years: 1914–1918
- Rank: Oberleutnant
- Units: Flieger-Abteilung (Flier Detachment) 8b; Flieger-Abteilung (Flier Detachment) 9b; Kampfeinsitzerkommando (Combat Single-Seater Command) Einsisheim; Jagdstaffel 16; Jagdstaffel 23
- Awards: Pour le Mérite; Knight's Cross of the Hohenzollern House Order; Bavarian Military Merit Cross; Württemberg's Friedrich Order; Baden's Order of the Zähringer Lion; Iron Cross Second and First Class

Otto Kissenberth (26 February 1893 – 2 August 1919) was a German flying ace of World War I credited with 20 aerial victories. He was a prewar mechanical engineer who joined the German air service in 1914. After being trained and after serving as a reconnaissance pilot, he became one of the first German fighter pilots, flying with Kampfeinsitzerkommando (Combat Single-Seater Command) KEK Einsisheim. He scored six victories with this unit as it morphed into a fighter squadron, Jagdstaffel 16. His success brought him command of Jagdstaffel 23 on 4 August 1917. He would run his victory tally to 20, downing his final victim using a captured British Sopwith Camel on 20 May 1918. Nine days later, a crash while flying the Camel ended Kissenberth's combat career. His injuries were severe enough he was not returned to combat, instead being assigned to command Schleissheim's flying school. Although Otto Kissenberth survived the war, he died soon after in a mountaineering accident on 2 August 1919.

== Early life ==
Born in Landshut, Bavaria, in 1893, Kissenberth studied at Grenoble University before completing an engineering degree in Munich and then working for the Gustav Otto aircraft works as a mechanical engineer.

== Early aviation service ==
With his interest in aircraft design, Kissenberth joined the Fliegertruppe air service of the German Army in 1914. After training as a reconnaissance pilot with Fliegerersatz-Abteilung (Replacement Detachment), or FEA 1 at Schleissheim, Vizefeldwebel Kissenberth was posted to Bavaria's Feld-Flieger-Abteilung (Flier Detachment) 8b. On 21 March 1915, while on a sortie over the Vosges Mountains, he was wounded in action. Upon recovery, he joined another Bavarian unit, Flieger-Abteilung (Flier Detachment) 9b, on 8 July 1915, which was stationed at Toblach in the Dolomite Alps. The unit served in Italy, including a daring bombing raid on Cortina on 31 July 1915, as well as on the Vosges front.

== Service as fighter pilot ==
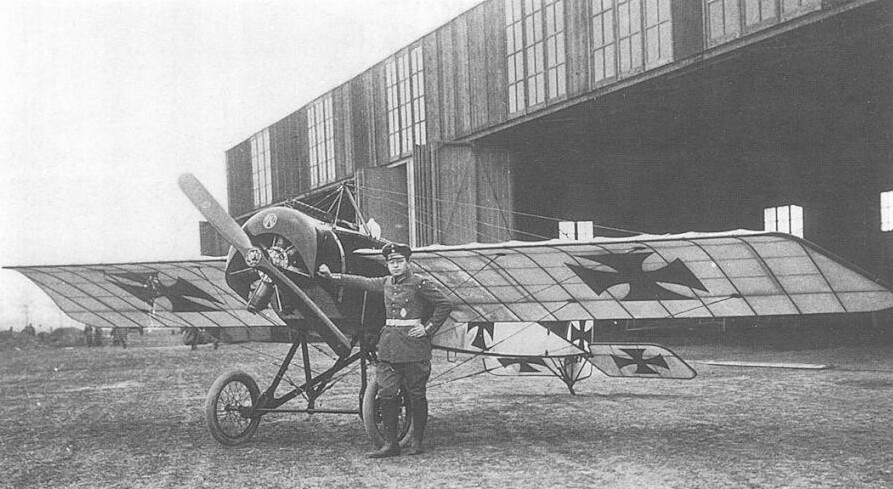
Kissenberth with a Pfalz E.I at Ensisheim

In 1916, FA 9b morphed into Kampfeinsitzerkommando (Combat Single-Seater Command) KEK Einsisheim, as the German Army struggled to find a tactical formation for its fighters. While flying with KEK E, Kissenberth was credited with his first three victories on 12 October. An Anglo-French bombing raid of some three French squadrons, 26 aircraft from the Royal Naval Air Service, and a contingent of four from the Lafayette Escadrille attacked the Mauser Rifle Works at Oberndorf am Neckar. Kissenberth blunted the assault, downing two of the invaders on his first sortie, and another on his next one. It was a feat worthy of Württemberg's Friedrich Order, Baden's Order of the Zähringer Lion, and the Bavarian Military Merit Order.

Kissenberth would not score again until 26 May 1917. KEK E formed the basis for a new fighter squadron, Royal Bavarian Jagdstaffel 16. As a member of Jasta 16b, he downed two SPADs and flamed a balloon during Summer 1917, bringing his count to six. Kissenberth was transferred to command of Royal Bavarian Jasta 23 on 4 August 1917. He thus became one of the few flying aces — along with pioneering fighter pilot, Leutnant Kurt Wintgens — to wear spectacles in air combat.

Kissenberth usually flew an Albatros D.V with a yellow and white Edelweiss insignia painted on its fuselage. He scored over a dozen victories with this aircraft, although his twentieth and final victory on 20 May 1918 came while flying a captured Sopwith Camel. On the evening of 29 May 1918, he was seriously injured when he crashed this British fighter. After convalescence, he did not return to his squadron. Instead, he served as commanding officer of the Schleissheim flying school until the end of the war.

== Death ==
On 2 August 1919, Kissenberth was killed in a mountaineering accident in the Bavarian Alps.
