= Theodor Rumpel (aviator) =

- A photo of Rumpel awaiting court martial for the Stalag Luft III#The Great Escape (1944) blunder
- Born: 25 March 1897; Bahrenfeld, Germany
- Died: 8 March 1983 (aged 85)
- Military career
- Allegiance: Germany
- Branch: Aviation
- Rank: Leutnant
- Units: Flieger-Abteilung (Artillerie)280, Jagdstaffel 26, Jagdstaffel 16, Jagdstaffel 23, Fliegerersatz-Abteilung 11
- Awards: Iron Cross

Leutnant Theodor Rumpel (25 March 1897 – 8 March 1983) was a World War I flying ace credited with five aerial victories.

== Biography ==
Theodor Rumpel was born in Bahrenfeld, Germany on 25 March 1897.

On 1 October 1914, while still 17 years old, he volunteered for military service in the First World War. As a Jaeger, he was stationed on the Eastern Front. He was commissioned as an officer and transferred regiments during May 1916.

In August 1916, he transferred to aviation duty to begin pilot training. In January 1917, he was posted as a pilot to Flieger-Abteilung (Artillerie)280 for artillery direction duties. He requested transfer to a fighter squadron, and was sent to Jagdstaffel 26 on 18 March. On 22 April, he moved to Jagdstaffel 16. There he flew an Albatros D.V with his personal colors upon it: black and white stripes encircling the fuselage, with a black nose from the cockpit forward. On 10 August 1917, he shot down an observation balloon for his first aerial victory. He followed up with a French Morane on 5 September.

Later in September, he was transferred to Jagdstaffel 23, and scored his third victory by downing a Société pour l'aviation et ses dérivés?SPAD on 19 September 1917. He destroyed another SPAD on 12 December. On 18 February 1918, he became an ace by killing Guy William Price in his Sopwith Camel.

On 24 March 1918, Rumpel was seriously wounded while in a dogfight. That seemed to end his combat career, as he was next known to be serving in a training unit, Fliegerersatz-Abteilung 11.

During World War II, Rumpel would command a training unit, as well as the Dulag Luft prisoner of war camp.
