= Archibald Buchanan (RAF officer) =

- Born: October 5, 1892; Long Island, New York, U.S.
- Military career
- Allegiance: United States
- Branch: Royal Air Force (United Kingdom); Air Service, United States Army
- Rank: Lieutenant
- Unit: Royal Air Force: No. 210 Squadron RAF
- Conflicts: World War I
- Awards: British Distinguished Flying Cross, French Croix de Guerre

Lieutenant Archibald Buchanan DFC (born October 5, 1892, date of death unknown) was a World War I flying ace credited with seven aerial victories.

Buchanan voyaged to England to join the Royal Naval Air Service. The RNAS and the Royal Flying Corps were amalgamated into the Royal Air Force before Buchanan earned his pilot's wings, but he was assigned to a former RNAS squadron, No. 210.

Buchanan began his victory string as a balloon buster on 30 June 1918, when he destroyed an enemy observation balloon northeast of Estaires. His second win, on 20 July, was shared with Captain Harold Mellings. Between 31 July and 29 September, he scored five more wins over enemy fighter planes; his final summary was victory over five Fokker D.VIIs, a Pfalz D.III, and a balloon.

On 17 October, he landed his Sopwith Camel at Ostend, Belgium, in the wake of the German retreat, only to be informed by locals that he was the first Allied soldier to come to the city after the Germans left.

On 30 October, Buchanan was shot down by Michael Hutterer of Jasta 23, and spent the rest of the war as a prisoner.

== Honors and awards ==
Distinguished Flying Cross (DFC)

Lieut. Archibald Buchanan, 210 Sqn. (Sea Patrol, FLANDERS)

On 29 September this officer displayed great gallantry. In an engagement with fifteen Fokker biplanes, owing to engine trouble he was compelled to remain under his flight; he nevertheless accounted for two enemy machines, attacking one under its tail causing it to crash, and driving another down out of control. In addition to the foregoing this officer has destroyed three machines and driven down two out of control.

== See also ==
- List of World War I flying aces from the United States

== Bibliography ==
- American Aces of World War I. Norman Franks, Harry Dempsey. Osprey Publishing, 2001. ISBN 1-84176-375-6, ISBN 978-1-84176-375-0.
