= William Mann (RAF officer) =

William Edward George Mann
- Born: 20 April 1899; Brentford, England
- Died: 4 May 1966 (aged 67)
- Military career
- Allegiance: United Kingdom
- Branch: Royal Air Force
- Service years: 1917–1945
- Rank: Air Commodore
- Nickname: "Pedro"
- Units: No. 208 Squadron RAF; No. 25 Squadron RAF; No. 6 Squadron RAF
- Commands: RAF Ismailia
- Conflicts: First World War; Second World War
- Awards: Companion of the Order of the Bath; Commander of the Order of the British Empire; Distinguished Flying Cross; Mentioned in Despatches (2); Legion of Merit (United States)

Air Commodore William Edward George Mann CB, CBE, DFC (20 April 1899 – 4 May 1966) was a senior officer in the Royal Air Force and a flying ace of the First World War credited with thirteen confirmed aerial victories. In later years, he specialized in signals and communications work, and was instrumental in developing mobile radars and signal units for the RAF in the Second World War.

After his retirement from military service, Mann became the Director of Telecommunications of the Ministry of Civil Aviation from 1948 to 1950. He then became Director-General of Civil Aviation Navigational Services until his final retirement in 1959.

== First World War ==
Mann began his military career as a Sopwith Camel pilot in the Royal Naval Air Service in 1917. It took him several months before he was successful, but from 8 May through 26 September 1918, he scored thirteen aerial victories while with 208 Squadron (formerly 8 Naval). His final tally was six German planes destroyed (including two shared victories), and seven more driven down out of control.

== Aerial victory list ==
No.	Date/time	Foe	Result	Location	Notes
1	8 May 1918 @ 1115 hours	Albatros D.V fighter	Driven down out of control	Provin	
2	9 May 1918 @ 1345 hours	Albatros D.V	Driven down out of control	Phalempin	
3	8 July 1918 @ 0810 hours	Rumpler reconnaissance craft	Destroyed	1 mile southwest of Estaires	Victory shared with another pilot
4	31 July 1918 @ 2020 hours	Albatros D.V	Destroyed	Southwest of Douai	Victory shared with another pilot
5	9 August 1918 @ 1125 hours	Fokker D.VII fighter	Driven down out of control	Nesle	
6	16 August 1918 @ 0905 hours	Hannover reconnaissance craft	Destroyed	Oppy, Pas-de-Calais	
7	27 August 1918 @ 0750 hours	Fokker D.VII	Set afire and destroyed	South of the Scarpe River	
8	1 September 1918 @ 1000 hours	DFW reconnaissance craft	Driven down out of control	North of Gloster Wood	
9	3 September 1918 @ 1425 hours	Fokker D.VII	Driven down out of control	Marquion	
10	6 September 1918 @ 1830 hours	Fokker D.VII	Set afire and destroyed	Canal du Nord	
11	6 September 1918 @ 1830 hours	Fokker D.VII	Driven down out of control	Canal du Nord	
12	25 September 1918 @ 1750 hours	Halberstadt reconnaissance craft	Destroyed	Gouy	
13	26 September 1918 @ 1840 hours	Driven down out of control	Southeast of St. Quentin		

== Interbellum ==
Mann spent a period of unemployment for some months as the new Royal Air Force downsized and reorganized. He spent 1920 in various instructor training courses. In 1921, he participated in the second Hendon Air Pageant; he also served on the Central Flying School's five man aerobatic team flying Sopwith Snipes along with Arthur Coningham. Mann would return to this team in 1924. They were the first to fly an inverted formation at Hendon.

Beginning 10 January 1926, he attended Electrical and Wireless School. Signals would become his specialty for the remainder of his career. He attended the RAF Staff College, Andover, beginning the course on 21 January 1936, before shipping out to the Middle East.

== Second World War ==
Mann continued to serve in the Mid East and Mediterranean; he helped develop mobile radar and signals units that served as models for the entire RAF. He served through the war, retiring on 18 April 1945.

== Later life ==
Mann's expertise in signals took him into civil service on familiar ground. He became the Civil Aviation Signals representative in Cairo, starting in 1945. He moved on to become the Director of Telecommunications of the Ministry of Civil Aviation from 1948 to 1950. He then became Director-General of Civil Aviation Navigational Services until his second retirement in 1959. He would spend the next two years representing the Decca Navigator Company before returning to England.

Mann died on 4 May 1966.

== Promotions in rank ==
- Temporary Sub-Lieutenant: 12 August 1917
- Second lieutenant: 1 April 1918
- Lieutenant: Unknown date (seniority from 1 April 1918)
- Temporary Captain and Flight commander: 27 August 1918
- Flying officer: 1 August 1919 (seniority of 1 April 1918)

–Transferred to Unemployed List on 27 August 1919–

- Flying officer: 2 January 1920 (seniority of 1 April 1918)
- Flight lieutenant: 1 July 1924
- Squadron leader: 1 December 1934
- Wing Commander: 1 July 1938
- Temporary Group Captain: 1 December 1940
- Temporary Air Commodore: 1 December 1943

== Honours and awards ==
Companion of the Order of the Bath: 2 January 1956
Commander of the Order of the British Empire: 1942
Distinguished Flying Cross: 3 December 1918
Mentioned in Dispatches: 14 January 1944; 24 September 1941
Officer of the Legion of Merit: 10 March 1944
Member of the Institution of Electrical Engineers

== Bibliography ==
- Shores, Christopher F.; Franks, Norman & Guest, Russell F. (1990). Above the Trenches: a Complete Record of the Fighter Aces and Units of the British Empire Air Forces 1915–1920. London, UK: Grub Street. ISBN 978-0-948817-19-9.
