= Anthony Arnold =

Anthony Rex Arnold
- Born: 26 August 1896; Fareham, Hampshire, England
- Died: 25 May 1954 (aged 57); Mozambique
- Military career
- Allegiance: United Kingdom
- Branch: Royal Flying Corps; Royal Air Force
- Service years: 1914 – after 1936
- Rank: Group Captain
- Unit: No. 8 Squadron RNAS
- Commands: No. 79 Squadron RAF
- Awards: Distinguished Service Cross; Distinguished Flying Cross; Belgian Croix de Guerre
- Other work: Served as Group Captain in 1936

Group Captain Anthony Rex Arnold DSC DFC (26 August 1896 – 25 May 1954) was a British World War I flying ace credited with five aerial victories.

== Early life ==
Arnold was born to Mary Delamere Tylor and Charles Lowther Arnold on 26 August 1896, in Fareham, Hampshire, England, a great-great-grandson of Gen. Benedict Arnold.

== Early service ==
Arnold was confirmed in the rank of Flight Sub-Lieutenant, effective from 1 August 1914, when he was assigned to HMS Pembroke on 5 October 1914. He was granted aviators certificate No. 876 on 28 August 1914. He was promoted to Flight Lieutenant on 31 December 1914. Arnold was elected to membership of the Royal Aero Club on 5 October 1915.

== Aerial victories ==
Assigned to No. 8 Naval Squadron RNAS, he began his victory string on 8 April 1917 and finished with his fifth win on 13 June 1917. He flew a Sopwith Triplane for all five wins. He then was posted to instructor duty and promoted Major in the newly formed RAF. His majority brought him command of No. 79 Squadron.

On 26 April 1918 Arnold was awarded the Distinguished Service Cross, and received the Distinguished Flying Cross on 1 January 1919.

== Post World War I ==
He remained in the postwar RAF. On 1 January 1930, he was promoted from Squadron Leader to Wing Commander, and was promoted to Group Captain on 1 January 1936.

By the 1950s, he was working for a bank. He died in Mozambique in 1954.
