= James White (RAF officer) =

Canadian stockbroker (1894–1973)

- Born: 9 July 1894; Manitoulin Island, Ontario
- Died: 2 January 1973 (aged 78); Toronto, Ontario
- Education: Highfield School
- Spouse: Eleanor Mary Gooderham (m. 1922)

Captain James Butler White DFC (9 July 1894 – 2 January 1972) was a World War I Royal Naval Air Service flying ace.

White was born on Manitoulin Island, Ontario, Canada.

He served with No. 8 Naval Squadron RNAS, which was renamed No. 208 Squadron RAF after the Royal Naval Air Service was merged with the Royal Flying Corps to form the Royal Air Force in 1918. He achieved 12 victories in total, his first on 24 January 1918 and his last two on 3 October 1918. All of his victories were scored while flying a Sopwith Camel.

The citation for his Distinguished Flying Cross (published in The London Gazette on 3 December 1918) read:

A fine fighting pilot who has accounted for eight enemy aeroplanes. He has led numerous offensive and low bombing raids, and by his able and daring leadership has achieved great success with a minimum of casualties to his patrol.

After the war, White entered the finance industry in Toronto. He started his own brokerage company and was eventually President of the Toronto Stock Exchange.
