= George Goodman Simpson =

- Born: 14 September 1896; Saint Kilda, Melbourne, Australia
- Died: April 1990 (aged 93); Horsham, Surrey, England
- Military career
- Allegiance: United Kingdom
- Branch: Aviation
- Rank: Squadron Leader
- Units: No. 1 Wing RNAS; No. 8 Naval Squadron; No. 9 Naval Squadron
- Conflicts: World War I World War II
- Awards: Distinguished Service Cross
- Other work: Returned to military service during World War II

Captain (later Squadron Leader) George Goodman Simpson (14 September 1896 – April 1990) was an Australian-born flying ace credited with eight confirmed victories while flying for the Royal Naval Air Service during World War I. He would serve his country again during World War II.

== Early life ==
George Goodman Simpson was born in Saint Kilda, Victoria, Australia, on the outskirts of Melbourne on 14 September 1896, to Minna Alice Lazarus and George Green Simpson. By 1901, the Simpson family, which included elder brother Rolfe, was living at Swaynes Hall, Saint Mary's Church National School, in Saffron Walden, England. In 1916, George Goodman Simpson lived in Regent's Park. In later life Simpson would claim to be native to London, England. He joined the Artists Rifles as a private soldier before World War I.

== World War I ==
Simpson joined the Royal Naval Air Service on 8 August 1915. After pilot's training, he was awarded his pilot's certificate at Chingford on 29 January 1916. He was then assigned to No. 1 Wing, where he flew Sopwith Pups and Nieuports.

Simpson then transferred to 8 Naval Squadron. During this posting, he scored his first aerial victory with a Nieuport, as well as becoming A Flight's commander. When the squadron upgraded to Sopwith Triplanes, he would score five more victories with his personal plane, number N5460. He would continue to fly a Triplane after a posting to 9 Naval Squadron, tallying two more wins while flying number N5462. His final victory was scored while 9 Naval was staged at Leffrinckoucke, France.

He was awarded a Distinguished Service Cross for his exploits:

Flt. Lieut. George Goodman Simpson.

For gallantry and able leadership in aerial fighting, notably on the following occasions:—

On 3 May 1917 he drove down a hostile aeroplane out of control.

On 11 May 1917, while on offensive patrol with five other machines, he attacked six hostile aircraft. One of these he brought down out of control, and a few minutes later he attacked another at close range and brought it down in flames.

On 23 May 1917 he led a formation of five machines to attack at least twice that number of hostile aeroplanes. Both formations became split up, and a general fight ensued. Five times during the combat he drove off hostile aeroplanes from another of our machines, and one of those which he attacked was seen to go down in a spin.

After leaving 9 Naval for England, Simpson flew Home Defence sorties from RAF Cranwell during the latter part of 1917, though without results. He then became a test pilot at RAF Martlesham Heath during 1918.

Simpson married Constance Vera Baker at Christ Church on Albany Street in London on 21 July 1918.

== List of aerial victories ==
No.	Date/time	Aircraft	Foe	Result	Location	Notes
1	4 December 1916 @ 1100 hours	Nieuport serial number 3958	Albatros D.I	Driven down out of control	Northeast of Bapaume, France	Victory shared with another pilot
2	24 April 1917 @ 0840 hours	Sopwith Triplane s/n N5460	Albatros D.III	Driven down out of control	Sailly, France	
3	2 May 1917 @ 0945 hours	Sopwith Triplane s/n N5460	German two-seater aircraft	Driven down out of control	Douai, France	
4	11 May 1917 @ 1950 hours	Sopwith Triplane s/n N5460	Albatros D.III	Driven down out of control	Douai, France	
5	11 May 1917 @ 1950 hours	Sopwith Triplane s/n N5460	Albatros D.III	Set afire in midair; destroyed	Douai, France	
6	23 May 1917 @ 1800 hours	Sopwith Triplane s/n N5460	Albatros D.III	Driven down out of control	Douai, France	
7	24 July 1917 @ 0635 hours	Sopwith Triplane s/n N5462	German two-seater aircraft	Driven down out of control	Leffinghe	
8	28 July 1917 @ 1735 hours	Sopwith Triplane s/n N5462	German two-seater aircraft	Driven down out of control	Middelkerke, Belgium	Victory shared with Francis Mellersh

== Post World War I ==
On 31 January 1919, Simpson was confirmed in rank as a captain. He then disappears into the mists of history until the Second World War.

On 10 July 1939 Captain Goodman was appointed as a Flight Lieutenant in Class CC of the Royal Air Force reserves. On 1 September 1939, as the Second World War heated up, he was still ranked as Flight Lieutenant but had been moved up to the Royal Air Force Volunteer Reserve. One December 1941 saw him promoted to temporary Squadron Leader. Nothing more is known of his service in this war.

Several years after the war, on 10 February 1954, he gave up his commission but retained the honorary rank of Squadron Leader.

George Goodman Simpson died in Horsham in April 1990.
