= Reginald Llewellyn =

British flying ace of WWII

- Born: 25 March 1914; Bristol, England
- Died: 6 August 2000 (aged 86); Claremont, Tasmania, Australia
- Military career
- Allegiance: United Kingdom
- Branch: Royal Air Force
- Rank: Squadron Leader
- Unit: No. 213 Squadron
- Commands: No. 74 Squadron (1945); No. 208 Squadron (1946); No. 87 Squadron (1946); No. 111 Squadron (1946–1947)
- Conflicts: Second World War: Battle of France; Battle of Britain
- Awards: Distinguished Flying Medal

Reginald Llewellyn DFM (25 March 1914 – 6 August 2000) was a British flying ace of the Royal Air Force (RAF) during the Second World War. He is credited with the destruction of at least fifteen aircraft.

Born in Bristol, Llewellyn joined the RAF in 1930 to train as ground crew. He subsequently applied to train as a pilot and by the outbreak of the Second World War had his wings. He flew extensively with No. 213 Squadron during the Battle of France and the subsequent Battle of Britain, claiming several aerial victories for which he would later be awarded the Distinguished Flying Medal. He was wounded on 15 September 1940 which put an end to his operational flying for the duration of the war. He continued to serve in the RAF in the postwar period, holding a series of squadron commands before spending the rest of his military career as a staff officer. He emigrated to Australia in 1984, settling in Tasmania where he died at the age of 86.

== Early life ==
Reginald Thomas Llewellyn was born on 25 March 1914 in Bristol, England. In early 1930, when he was still fifteen, he joined the Royal Air Force (RAF) for training as ground crew. He qualified in late 1933 and the following year was sent to Iraq, where he served at the RAF station at Habbanyia. In 1938, having been promoted to sergeant upon completion of a gunnery course, he was posted to No. 27 Squadron on the Indian Northwest frontier. There he served as an air gunner on Westland Wapitis before volunteering to train as a pilot. He returned to the United Kingdom in late 1938 to learn to fly.

== Second World War ==
The Second World War had broken out by the time Llewellyn had gained his pilot's wings and in October 1939, he was posted to No. 263 Squadron as a sergeant pilot. This had just been reformed as a fighter squadron at Filton using biplane Gloster Gladiators. Two months later Llwellyn was transferred to No. 41 Squadron at Catterick but had trouble adapting to its Supermarine Spitfire fighters and was sent to Aston Down for refresher training on monoplanes. In late January 1940, he was posted to No. 213 Squadron. This was at Wittering and, equipped with the Hawker Hurricane fighter, engaged in patrolling duties along the east coast of England.

=== Battle of France ===
A week after Germany invaded France and the Low Countries on 10 May, No. 213 Squadron was sent to Merville as reinforcements for the British fighter squadrons operating in the country. It was heavily engaged and by 21 May it was back in England, with a flight based at Manston and flying sorties to France. On 29 May Llewellyn shot down two Messerschmitt Bf 109 fighters over Dunkirk and also claimed a Heinkel He 111 medium bomber as destroyed although this could not be confirmed.

=== Battle of Britain ===
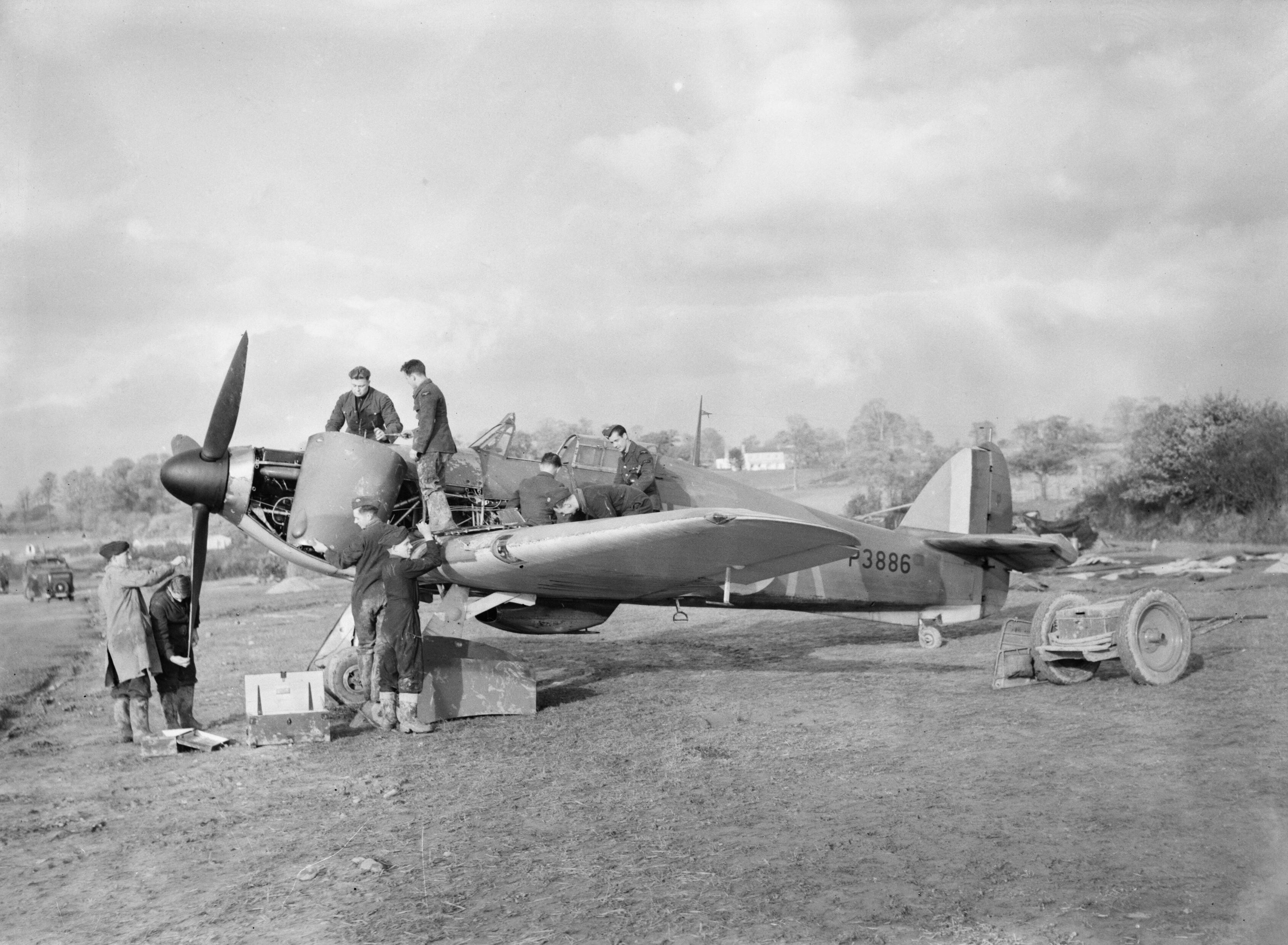
A Hawker Hurricane fighter at the RAF station at Exeter, 1940

Once the evacuation of the British Expeditionary Force from France was complete, No. 213 Squadron was engaged in bomber escort and patrol duties from Exeter. As the Luftwaffe increased its operations along the English Channel in August, the squadron were scrambled multiple times on a daily basis. On 11 August Llewellyn destroyed a Junkers Ju 88 medium bomber, shared in the destruction of a second, and damaged a third, all over the Isle of Portland. He damaged a Dornier Do 17 medium bomber near Seaton on 14 August and the next day shot down three Messerschmitt Bf 110 heavy fighters 5 miles (8.0 km) south of Portland Bill. On 19 August he destroyed a Ju 88, and repeated the feat the next day in the vicinity of Newton Abbott.

On 25 August, a Bf 110 was destroyed to the south of Portland Bill by Llewellyn. Later the same day he destroyed a Bf 109 inland from the Isle of Portland. He shot down a pair of Bf 110s near Selsey Bill on 11 September. His final aerial victory was on 15 September, what is now known as Battle of Britain Day: he destroyed a Do 17 near Edenbridge. However, his Hurricane was subsequently damaged in an engagement with Bf 110s over Hawkhurst and, seriously wounded in the arm, baled out. He landed safely but his wounds required prolonged treatment. In the meantime, in recognition of his performances during the campaigns in France and England, he was awarded the Distinguished Flying Medal in October. The citation, published in The London Gazette, read:

This airman has participated in numerous engagements against the enemy in Belgium, Northern France and, later, in England. He has at all times displayed great courage and devotion to duty and has destroyed twelve enemy aircraft and shared in the destruction of others.

— London Gazette, No. 34976, 22 October 1940

=== Later war service ===
Llewellyn was unable to return to duty until August 1941 and the bulk of the remainder of his war service was as an armaments officer. He was commissioned in November 1941 as a pilot officer, promoted to flying officer the following October, and was made a flight lieutenant in November 1943. In June 1945 he was posted to No. 74 Squadron, which was based at Colerne and converting to the Gloster Meteor jet fighter, as a flight commander.

== Postwar career ==
Llewellyn remained in the RAF in the postwar period, being granted a permanent commission in the RAF as a flight lieutenant, with seniority backdated to May 1945. He took command of No. 74 Squadron in September 1945 as an acting squadron leader. In January 1946, Llewellyn was sent to Palestine to take command of the Spitfire-equipped No. 208 Squadron. After six months there, he was sent to Italy to lead No. 87 Squadron, an appointment that only lasted a few months before he was given command of No. 111 Squadron in December. Operating Spitfires, this unit was based in Klagenfurt in Austria where it was part of the British Air Forces of Occupation. Llewellyn was the squadron's final commander before it was disbanded in May 1947. The remainder of his RAF service, which ended in March 1957, was spent as a staff officer.

== Later life ==
Returning to civilian life, Llewellyn worked as a safety officer for the United States Air Force for a time. In 1984 he emigrated to Australia, settling in Claremont, Tasmania. He died there on 6 August 2000.

Llewellyn is credited with having destroyed fifteen aircraft, one being shared with another pilot. Another aircraft claimed as destroyed was unconfirmed. He is also believed to have probably destroyed one more aircraft and damaged two others.
