= Friedrich Ritter von Röth =

German flying ace (1893–1918)

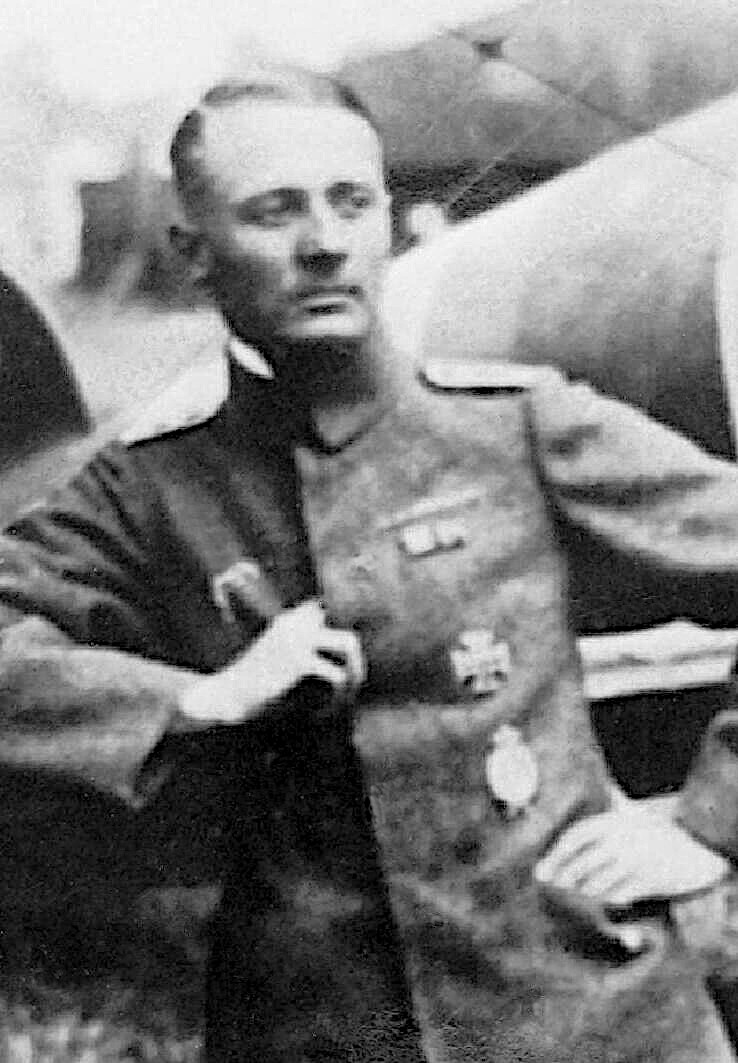
- Born: 29 September 1893; Nuremberg
- Died: 31 December 1918 (aged 25)
- Military career
- Allegiance: German Empire
- Branch: Imperial German Army; Luftstreitkräfte
- Rank: Oberleutnant
- Nickname: Fritz
- Units: 8th Bavarian Field Artillery Regiment; Flieger-Abteilung (Artillerie) 296 (Flier Detachment (Artillery) 296); Jagdstaffel 34 (Fighter Squadron 34); Jagdstaffel 16 (Fighter Squadron 16); Jagdstaffel 23 (Fighter Squadron 23)
- Commands: Jagdstaffel 16
- Conflicts: World War I
- Awards: Pour le Merite; House Order of Hohenzollern; Iron Cross; Military Order of Max Joseph; Military Merit Order(Bavaria)

Oberleutnant Friedrich Ritter von Röth (29 September 1893 – 31 December 1918) was a German World War I fighter ace with 28 victories. He was the most successful German pilot at the extremely hazardous practice of shooting down enemy observation balloons, and destroyed 20 of them. Röth concentrated on observation balloons because they were large enough targets for him to see and hit with machine gun fire.

Distressed by his nation's loss of the war, and by his religious compunctions against killing, he shot himself to death on 31 December 1918.

== Early life ==
Friedrich Röth was born in Nuremberg, Germany on 29 September 1893. He was the son of a factory owner. He became known by the nickname of "Fritz". He was just graduating college when World War I broke out.

== Early service ==
Friedrich Röth served originally in the 8th Bavarian Field Artillery Regiment. He was seriously wounded early in the war. Once he was again fit for duty, he was commissioned as a Leutnant on 29 May 1915. He transferred to the aerial service, only to be severely injured in a crash and spend nearly another year in hospital. Because of his extended recuperation, he did not qualify as a pilot until early 1917. His initial assignment was to a Bavarian artillery spotting unit, Flieger-Abteilung (Artillerie) 296. While with them, he was granted the Bavarian Military Merit Order with Swords on 11 June. Beginning 17 September 1917, he served in a fighter squadron, Jagdstaffel 34, but did not down any enemies until he was assigned to Jagdstaffel 23 on 4 October. On 1 November, he was awarded the German Iron Cross, First Class.

== Balloon busting ace ==
Röth was unsuccessful as a fighter pilot until he decided to concentrate his effort on observation balloons. He was a poor shot who targeted balloons because they were so large. His decision meant he took upon himself one of the most hazardous duties of World War I fighter aviation. Because balloons flew at a known altitude, antiaircraft guns ringing them were extremely accurate. The balloons were low enough that an attacker was exposed to small arms fire as well. Protective fighters also lurked in the vicinity. The balloons were so well defended because they were an important part of the artillery fire direction systems of World War I. Aerial observers in the balloons' gondolas called down accurate artillery fire on enemy soldiers.

On 25 January 1918, as a member of Jagdstaffel 23, Röth scored his first victories, downing three balloons in eight minutes. He shot down a British observation plane on 26 February and downed another pair of balloons on 21 March. On 1 April, he single-handedly shot down four balloons in ten minutes.

== Command ==
Röth was assigned to command Jagdstaffel 16 on 8 April 1918, just four days after the previous Staffelführer, Heinrich Geigl, died in a midair collision with a Sopwith Camel. By this time, he had begun scrupulous planning of his raids on balloons, spending hours studying potential target balloons through a telescope. He also loaded his guns to maximize effectiveness against balloons; his left-hand machine gun would be loaded with 80 percent incendiaries and 20 percent armor-piercing, and the right-hand gun vice versa. As his new unit used Pfalz D.IIIa fighters, Röth may have used one occasionally.

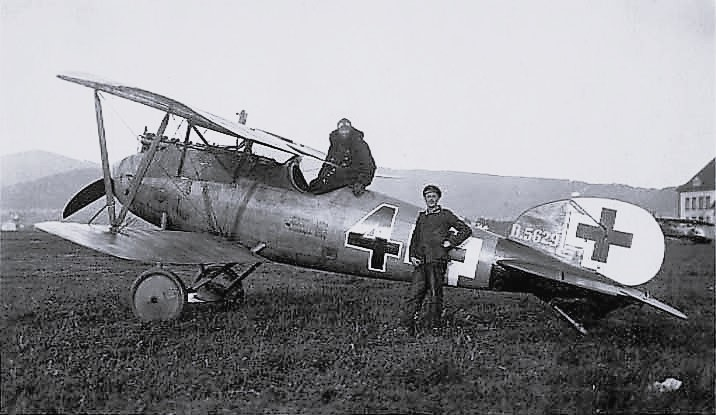
A typical Albatros D.Va.

At this time, Röth was known to fly an Albatros D.V marked with his personal livery overlaying the standard markings. It bore a white propeller spinner, yellow fuselage, and gray engine cowling, and wheel covers. Painted on the fuselage's side even with the trailing edge of the cockpit was a large disk divided into white and black halves.

On 29 May 1918, Röth attacked the balloons he had been spying upon. Picking a time when there were no enemy fighters in sight and the wind was in his favor, Röth set five balloons afire in 15 minutes without assistance. Five other balloons were rapidly winched to ground to protect them. Röth had expended 220 rounds to burn the balloons, shooting down each in a single pass. He dodged enemy fighters and heavy antiaircraft fire to do it.

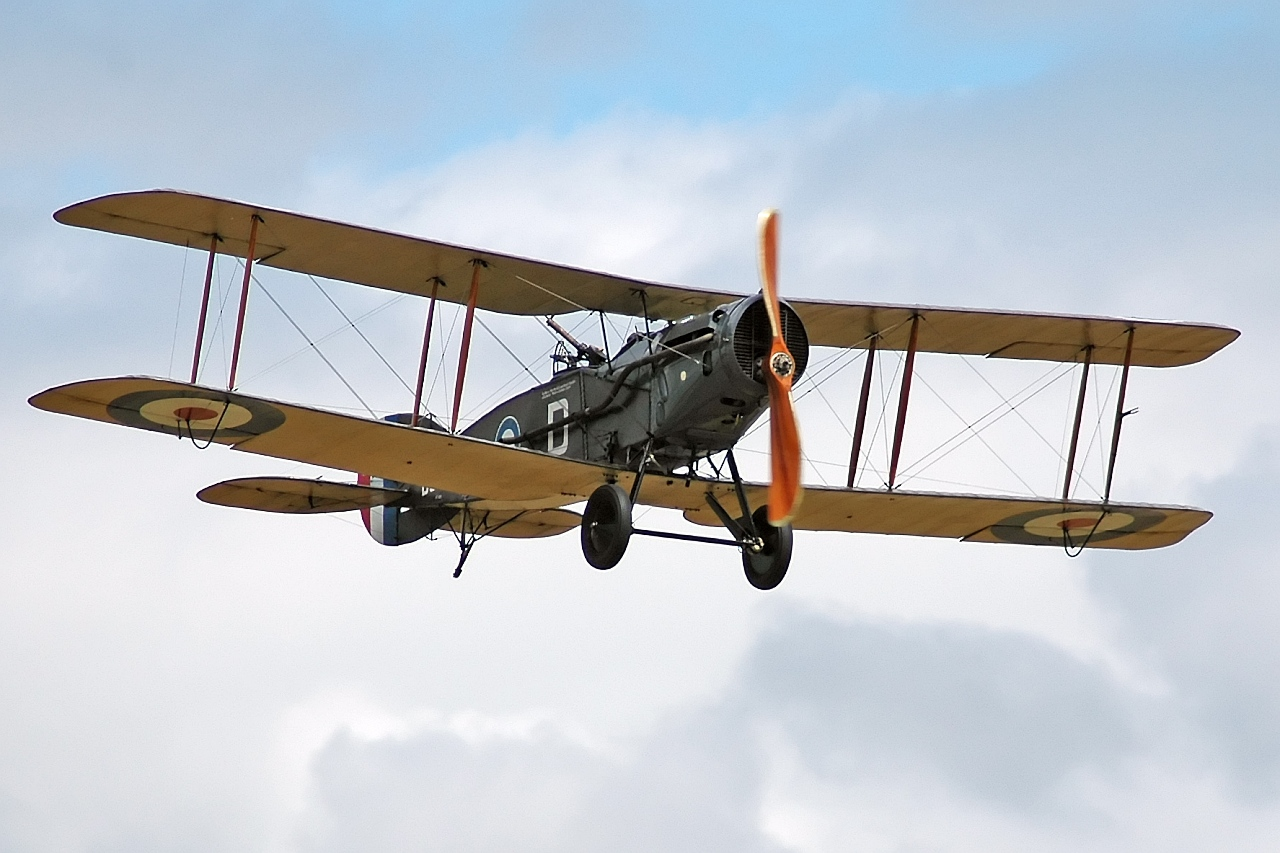
Cowell was flying a Bristol F2B when downed by Röth.

Röth received a new Fokker D.VII fighter in early August; he used this type airplane for his last 10 aerial victories. He went on to destroy three balloons each on 13 August and 10 October, along with seven enemy airplanes on various dates. On 30 July 1918 he shot down 16-victory Irish ace Sergeant John Cowell's 20 Squadron Bristol F.2b.

Röth awarded Germany's highest decoration for valor, the Pour le Mérite, on 8 September 1918. Röth's last victory was on 14 October 1918; he was wounded in the foot during the fight. The cast on Röth's foot kept him out of combat for the duration of the war. On 11 November 1918, he was being piloted by a friend to observe the war's end against orders over the battlefield as the guns fell silent. Röth's final victory list credited him with destroying 20 enemy observation balloons and eight enemy airplanes.

== Post-war death ==
On 31 December 1918, Röth shot himself to death. He was reportedly depressed by Germany's defeat and the subsequent ongoing revolution, as well as troubled by his killings during the war.

In 1919, Röth was posthumously awarded the Military Order of Max Joseph. This award knighted him, thus posthumously changing his name to Friedrich Ritter von Röth. The award also entitled him to a lifelong pension.
