= Johannes Janzen =

German flying ace (1886–1945)

- Born: 21 May 1886; Fronza (near Marienwerder), West Prussia
- Died: 18 October 1945 (aged 59)
- Burial place: Russian Prisoner of War camp
- Military career
- Allegiance: Germany
- Branch: Aviation
- Service years: 1914-1918
- Rank: Leutnant
- Nickname: "Hans"
- Units: 1st Leib-Husaren-Regiment (1st Hussar Regiment); Fliegerersatz-Abteilung (Replacement Detachment) 3; Kampfstaffel (Tactical Bomber Squadron) 12; Jagdstaffel 23 (Fighter Squadron 23); Jagdstaffel 6 (Fighter Squadron 6); Flieger Staffel (Flying Squadron) 120
- Commands: Jagdstaffel 4 (Fighter Squadron 4); Jagdstaffel 6
- Awards: Iron Cross Second and First Class
- Other work: Also fought in World War II

Leutnant Johannes Max Janzen (21 May 1886 – 18 October 1945) was a World War I flying ace credited with thirteen aerial victories. He returned to Germany's military service during World War II, and died in a Russian prison camp on 18 October 1945.

== Early life and cavalry service ==
Janzen was born in either of two locales, depending on the source. He was either born in Fronza, the Kingdom of Prussia, or in Gdańsk. As World War began, on 3 August 1914, Janzen volunteered for duty in 1st Leib-Husaren-Regiment. He was promoted to Leutnant der Reserve on 24 February 1916.

== Aviation service ==
Janzen transferred to aviation duty on 4 May 1916. He trained with Fliegerersatz-Abteilung (Replacement Detachment) 3 until 22 August, then was forwarded to Kampfstaffel (Tactical Bomber Squadron) 12. He received his pilot's badge on 8 October, with the Second Class Iron Cross following the day after. He was assigned to combat with Royal Bavarian Jagdstaffel 23 (Fighter Squadron 23) on 28 November 1916. He scored his first aerial victory with them on 25 February 1917. His First Class Iron Cross was awarded on 29 March. On 16 October, he was transferred to Royal Prussian Jagdstaffel 6. He scored three more victories between 30 November 1917 and 27 March 1918.

== Janzen in command ==
On 28 March 1918, he was appointed to command of Royal Prussian Jagdstaffel 4. He helmed Jagdstaffel 4 without scoring any victories through 3 May 1918. On that day, he was transferred to command of Jagdstaffel 6, whose Staffelfuhrer Wilhelm Reinhard, had moved up to the wing command of Jagdgeschwader I. The next day, Janzen became an ace by shooting down a Spad. On 9 May, he survived being downed by Captain Oliver Colin LeBoutillier; Janzen's plane's controls had been shot away, but he spun harmlessly to the ground. Janzen went on to rack up eight more wins through 7 June 1918. Two days later, his Fokker Dr.1's synchronization gear failed and Janzen shot off his own propeller while attacking a Spad. He was captured, but escaped in December.

== Postwar ==
Janzen served in Flieger Staffel (Flying Squadron) 120 of the Reichswehr from January through May 1920. Janzen died while in Russian captivity, on 18 October 1945.
