= Jagdstaffel 23 =

Jasta 23
- Active: 1916–1918
- Country: German Empire
- Branch: Luftstreitkräfte
- Type: Fighter squadron
- Engagements: World War I

Royal Bavarian Jagdstaffel 23 was a "hunting group" (i.e., fighter squadron) of the Luftstreitkräfte, the air arm of the Imperial German Army during World War I. As one of the original German fighter squadrons, the unit would score a minimum of 63 verified aerial victories. They scored twelve wins over enemy observation balloons as a squadron.

In turn, their casualties for the war would amount to 14 pilots killed in action, one killed in a flying accident, nine wounded in action, and two taken prisoner of war.

== History ==
Eduard Ritter von Schleich

Royal Bavarian Jagdstaffel 23 was established on 25 October 1916 at Metz-Frescaty. It would not gain a commanding officer until 17 November. The jagdstaffel finally came ready for action on the last day of the year. The following day, 1 January 1917, Jasta 23 moved into action at Puxieux. It would not score its first win until 14 February. On 4 July 1917, it was officially designated a Bavarian squadron. It joined the Bavarian Jagdgeschwader IV under command of Eduard Ritter von Schleich on 10 October 1918, and served there for the last month of the war.

== Commanding officers (Staffelführer) ==
1. Paul Backhaus, 17 November 1916 – 4 August 1917
2. Otto Kissenberth, 4 August 1917 – 29 May 1918 (WIA)
3. Heinrich Seywald, 2 June 1918 – 29 June 1918 (WIA)
4. Fritz Krautheim, 2 July 1918 – 19 July 1918 (WIA)
5. Heinrich Seywald, 19 July 1918 – 11 November 1918

== Aerodromes ==
1. Armee-Abteilung Strantz: 25 October 1916 – 1 January 1917
2. Puxieux, Mars-la-Tour: 1 January 1917 – 14 April 1917
3. Erlon, France: 16 April 1917 – 14 July 1917
4. Jametz, France: 20 July 1917 – 24 November 1917
5. Saint-Mard, France: 24 November 1917 – 4 February 1918
6. Aniche: 6 February 1918 – 16 March 1918
7. Émerchicourt, France: 17 March 1918 – 27 March 1918
8. Bapaume, France: 27 March 1918 – 18 April 1918
9. Epinoy, France: 18 April 1918 – 27 August 1918
10. Lieu-Saint-Amand: 27 August 1918 – 25 September 1918
11. Bühl, Germany: 27 September 1918 – 8 October 1918
12. Harmignies, Belgium: 13 October 1918 – 5 November 1918
13. Fleurs, France: 5 November 1918 – 11 November 1918

== Notable members ==
- Otto Kissenberth Pour le Merite, Royal House Order of Hohenzollern, Iron Cross
- Balloon buster Friedrich Ritter von Röth Pour le Merite, Hohenzollern, Iron Cross, Military Order of Max Joseph
- Michael Hutterer Iron Cross
- Theodor Rumpel Iron Cross
- Johannes Janzen Iron Cross

Other aces serving in the unit were Karl Schattauer, Heinrich Seywald, Albert Haussmann, Max Gossner, and Albert Dietlen.

== Aircraft ==
Initial equipment for Jasta 23 was the Albatros D.II fighter. Later, it would be refurnished with Pfalz D.XII and Roland D.VIa fighters.

== Operations ==
Jasta 23 was formed in the Armee-Abteilung Strantz Sector. On 16 April 1917, it moved to the 7. Armee Sector. Its next move, on 18 July, saw it assigned to 5. Armee.

In February 1918, it moved to support 17. Armee at Aniche. On 27 September, it moved to the Armee-Abteilung A Sector; shortly thereafter, on 8 October, it moved on to work for 2. Armee until war's end.
