= William Lancelot Jordan =

South African World War I flying ace

- Born: 3 December 1896; Georgetown, Cape Colony
- Died: 20 August 1925 (aged 28); Guildford, Surrey
- Military career
- Allegiance: United Kingdom: Union of South Africa
- Branch: Royal Naval Air Service; Royal Air Force
- Service years: 1916–1918
- Rank: Captain
- Conflicts: World War I
- Awards: Distinguished Service Cross & Bar; Distinguished Flying Cross

Captain William Lancelot Jordan DSC & Bar, DFC (3 December 1896 – 20 August 1925) was a South African World War I flying ace credited with 39 victories.

== Early life ==
William Lancelot Jordan was born in Georgetown (now George), Cape Colony, the youngest son of Mrs. J. E. Jordan. Jordan later moved to London.

== Military service ==
Jordan enlisted in the Royal Naval Air Service (RNAS) as a mechanic in September 1916, and subsequently volunteered to fly as a gunner. He received his pilot's training in 1917 and was posted to RNAS 8 Naval Squadron to fly Sopwith Triplanes. Shortly after his arrival, Naval 8 upgraded to Sopwith Camels. Jordan scored all 39 of his victories flying a Sopwith Camel. He became the leading ace of the 25 who served with Naval 8, and the third highest scoring ace ever on Sopwith Camels.

Jordan scored his first victory on 13 July 1917, driving a German Rumpler down out of control. His third through seventh victories were triumphs shared with other squadron members. One of these victories, his fourth, was achieved over German ace Adolf Ritter von Tutschek on 11 August 1917.

His string of victories was interrupted after five by his suffering a leg wound in September 1917. He continued his success after recovering, resuming scoring on 6 December 1917.

It was only with his tenth victory that Jordan was credited with an actual destruction of an enemy, as opposed to driving them down out of control. From then onwards, he tended to score his triumphs singlehandedly, and to destroy about a third of his opponents. He had nine victories in both January and July 1918, with scattered wins in other months. His 39th and last victory came on 12 August 1918.

RNAS 8 became No. 208 Squadron of the Royal Air Force when the latter was founded by amalgamation of the RNAS and the Royal Flying Corps on 1 April 1918. Jordan thus scored 18 victories for the RNAS and 21 for the RAF without changing squadrons. His official score totaled 6 aircraft destroyed (with a further 5 shared destroyed), and 14 'out of control' (with a further 14 shared 'out of control'). Jordan was removed from operations before the end of the war, and thus survived.

== Postwar ==
Jordan was married 30 November 1920 to Hazel Thorne in Kobe, Japan The wedding announcement mentions his mother's residence in Demerara as well as London, offering a clue to Jordan's postwar residence.

He died after a car accident near Guildford, Surrey on 20 August 1925.

== Citations for Decorations ==
Distinguished Service Cross (DSC)

Flt. Sub-Lieut. William Lancelot Jordan, R.N.A.S.
In recognition of the courage and initiative displayed by him in aerial combats.
On the 13th July, 1917, in company with another pilot, he attacked an enemy two-seater machine. After bursts of fire from both of our machines, the enemy observer was seen to collapse in the cock-pit, and the enemy aircraft was last seen disappearing among some houses. On the 6th December, 1917, whilst patrolling at 15,000 feet, he saw a two-seater enemy aircraft at 10,500 feet, aud dived on him, firing about thirty rounds. After falling over to the left, enemy aircraft went down vertically. He has also been instrumental in bringing down other enemy machines.

Distinguished Service Cross (DSC) Bar

Flt. Lieut. William Lancelot Jordan, D.S.C., R.N.A.S.
For skill and determination when leading offensive patrols.
On the 6th January, 1918, when on offensive patrol he observed ten Albatross scouts. The enemy dived and spread out, and Flt. Lieut. Jordan, in conjunction with another pilot, attacked one, into which he fired at close range, sending it down in a side-slipping dive.

Distinguished Flying Cross (DFC)

Lieut. (Hon. Capt.) William Lancelot Jordan, D.S.C. (late R.N.A.S.).
A brilliant and most gallant leader who has already been awarded the D.S.C. and Bar for distinguished services and devotion to duty. He has led numerous offensive patrols into action, displaying at all times marked ability, determination and dash. He is an ideal Squadron Commander who has personally accounted for twenty-five enemy machines.
