= Military Merit Cross (Bavaria) =

Bavarian Military Merit Cross
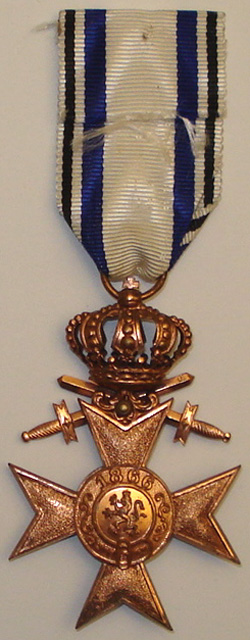
- Military Merit Cross 3rd Class with Crown and Swords on wartime ribbon
- Type: Cross in three classes
- Awarded for: Bravery or military merit
- Description: Maltese cross with a center medallion; can be awarded with and without swords and with and without a royal crown
- Presented by: Kingdom of Bavaria
- Eligibility: Enlisted soldiers
- Status: Obsolete
- Established: 19 July 1866
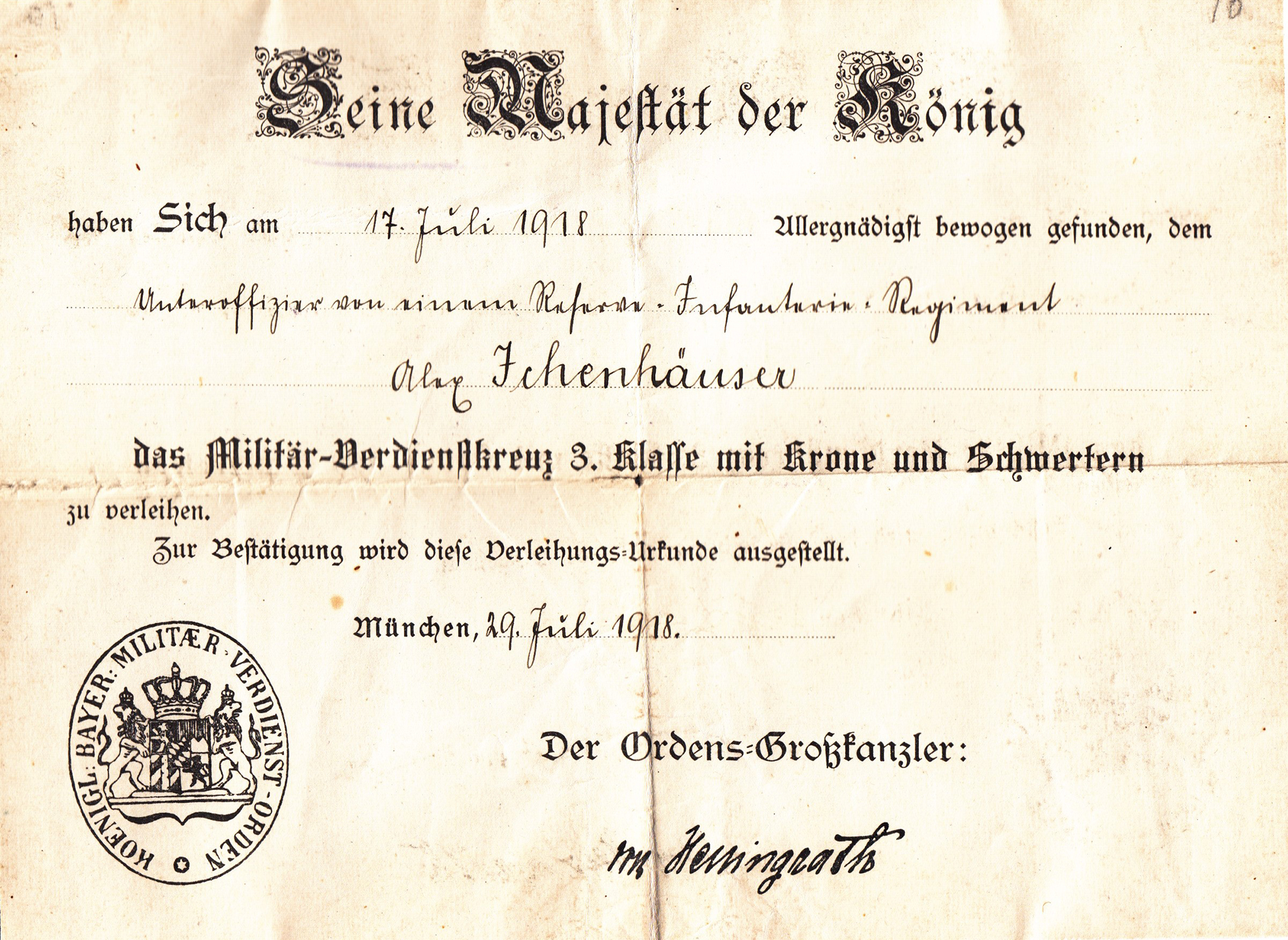
- Certificate of award with 3rd Class with Crown and Swords (1918)

Precedence
- Next (higher): Silver Bravery Medal
- Related: Prussian Iron Cross

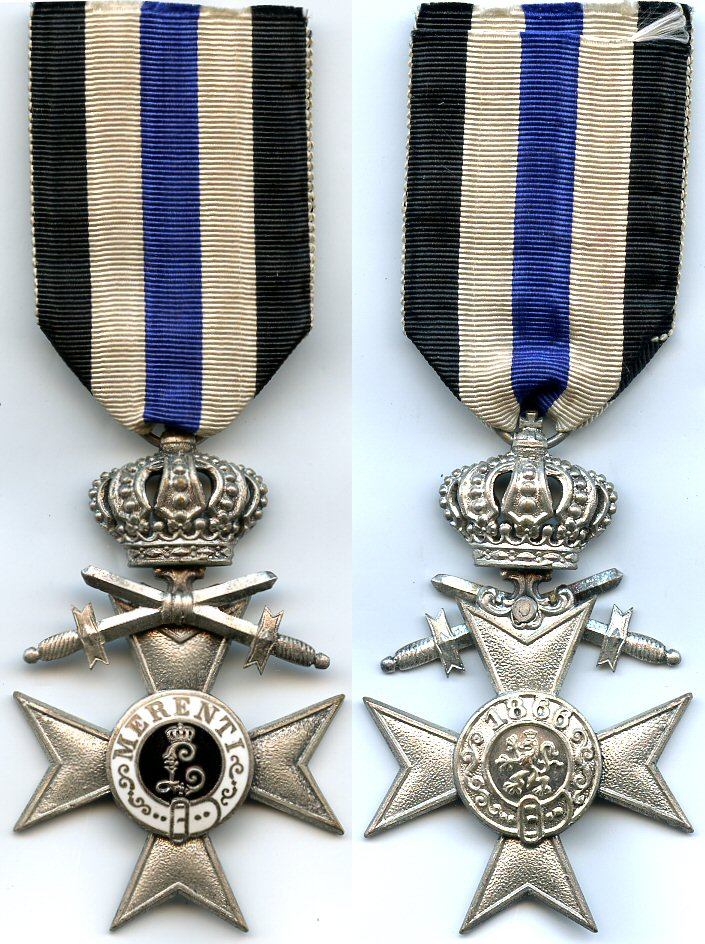
Military Merit Cross 2nd class with crown and swords on ribbon for non combatant military officials

The Bavarian Military Merit Cross (German: Militär-Verdienstkreuz) was the Kingdom of Bavaria's main decoration for bravery and military merit for enlisted soldiers. It was intended "to reward extraordinary merit by non-commissioned officers, soldiers, and lower-ranking officials." It was originally established on 19 July 1866 as the 5th Class of the Military Merit Order, which was the main decoration for bravery and military merit for officers and higher-ranking officials. Civilians acting in support of the army were also made eligible for the decoration.

The Military Merit Cross ranked after the Gold and Silver Military Merit Medals (renamed the Bravery Medals in 1918), which were Bavaria's highest military honors for NCOs and enlisted soldiers.

The cross was a Maltese cross with a center medallion. The obverse of the center medallion had an "L" cipher of King Ludwig II in the center and the word "MERENTI" on the ring. The reverse had a Bavarian lion with the date of founding, "1866", on the ring. The center medallion was enameled (the original Military Merit Cross was distinguished from the Knight 2nd Class of the Military Merit Order only by having silver instead of blue enameled arms).

The first recipient appears to have been Gendarm Johann Winter, who received the Military Merit Cross in the Armee-Befehl (Army Order) of 20 August 1866

The Bavarian Military Merit Cross underwent three major revisions. In February 1891, awards with swords were authorized to distinguish wartime awards, whether for bravery or military merit, from peacetime awards. This was made retroactive for wartime awards from the Austro-Prussian War of 1866 and Franco-Prussian War of 1870-71.

In 1905, the statutes of the Military Merit Order were revised and the Military Merit Cross was divided into two classes. The former Military Merit Cross became the Military Merit Cross 1st Class, and a new second class was created which had no enamel on the medallion. The distinction in classes was based on the rank of the recipient.

In 1913, another revision of the statutes of the Military Merit Order divided the Military Merit Cross into three classes. The old non-enameled 2nd Class became the 3rd Class and was changed from silver to bronze. The old 1st Class became the 2nd Class. The new 1st Class was identical to the 2nd Class except that it was gilt rather than silver. In addition, all classes were authorized to be awarded with a crown. The crown could be used for a second award to an NCO or soldier who already had received a particular class and whose rank precluded award of a higher class, or to recognize greater merit. There were then effectively 12 combinations: 3 classes each with or without crown, and each with or without swords. This doubled when one takes into account that there were two possible ribbons, one for soldiers and one for officials (Beamtenband).

World War I broke out the following year, and the Military Merit Cross became Bavaria's main decoration for bravery and merit by enlisted soldiers in that war, roughly equivalent to Prussia's Iron Cross (except unlike the Iron Cross, the classes of the Military Merit Cross were awarded based on rank). According to one source, the total number of awards of all classes was 380,976. Approximately 290,000 were of the 3rd Class with Swords and approximately 73,000 of the 3rd Class with Crown and Swords, the two lowest grades. The Military Merit Cross became obsolete with the fall of the German Empire and the Bavarian Kingdom in 1918, although the Bavarian government continued to process awards up to 1920.

== Notable recipients ==
- Sepp Dietrich (3rd Class with Swords) - Bavarian soldier; later Waffen SS-Oberst-Gruppenführer.
- Hans Ehard (1st Class with Swords on the Ribbon for War Merit) - Bavarian military official, later Minister-President of Bavaria (1946–54 and 1960–62).
- Rudolf Hess (3rd Class with Crown and Swords) Bavarian soldier, later Deputy Führer of the Nazi Party in the Third Reich.
- Adolf Hitler (3rd Class with Swords) - Bavarian Gefreiter and later Reich Chancellor of the German Reich.
- Otto Kissenberth (2nd Class with Swords) - German flying ace of World War I.
- Heinrich Müller (2nd Class with Swords) - Bavarian pilot for an artillery spotting unit, later head of the Gestapo
- Max Ritter von Müller (3rd Class with Crown and Swords) - German flying ace of World War I.
