= Robert J. O. Compston =

English fighter pilot

Robert John Orton Compston DSC** DFC
- Born: 9 January 1898; Farnham, Surrey, England
- Died: 28 January 1962 (aged 64); Worthing, Sussex, England
- Military career
- Allegiance: United Kingdom
- Branch: Royal Navy (RNAS); RAFVR
- Service years: 1915 - 1918, 1940 - 1954
- Rank: Wing Commander
- Unit: 8 Naval Squadron
- Commands: 40 Squadron
- Conflicts: World War I World War II
- Awards: Distinguished Service Cross with two Bars, Distinguished Flying Cross

Wing Commander Robert John Orton Compston DSC & 2 Bars DFC (9 January 1898 – 28 January 1962) was an English fighter pilot credited with 25 victories during World War I. He was one of only seven airman in this war who won three awards of the Distinguished Service Cross.

== Life and service ==
Robert John Orton Compston was born in Farnham, Surrey the son of Herbert Fuller Bright Compston, a clergyman, and his wife Rose Contance Compston (née Orton). He joined the Royal Naval Air Service in 1915 when he was 17 years old. He originally flew Home Defense missions, but was reassigned to 8 Naval Squadron when it went to France. He was a close friend of ace Robert Little.

Compston served in the Royal Air Force in the Second World War. On the 13 August 1940, while based at RAF Detling, the airfield came under attack by the Luftwaffe. It was the first major effort of the Germans during the Battle of Britain. Junkers Ju 87Stuka dive-bombers devastated the station and Squadron Leader Compston was wounded in action; one of 42 wounded and 24 killed. He retired from the RAFVR in 1954 with the rank of wing commander.

== Personal life ==
Compston married Nina Barclay in Chelsea in 1919. He died in the Worthing area of Sussex on 28 January 1962 aged 64.

== Honours and awards ==
- 12 May 1917 Flight Lieutenant Robert John Orton Compston, R.N.A.S. was awarded the Distinguished Service Cross (DSC):

"For conspicuous skill and gallantry during the past nine months, in particular when attached to the Royal Flying Corps, when he had numerous engagements with enemy aircraft, and certainly destroyed one."

— London Gazette

- 11 August 1917 Flight Commander Robert John Orton Compston, D.S.C., R.N.A.S. was awarded a bar to his Distinguished Servrtillery aeroplanes:

"On the 12th June, 1917, with three other machines, he attacked six hostile scouts. He got close to one, and shot it down out of control.

"On the 16th June, 1917, he attacked and brought down a two-seater Aviatik.

"On the 3rd July, 1917, he attacked two Aviatiks, which he drove down and forced to land."

— London Gazette

- On 16 March 1918 Flight Commander Robert John Orton Compston, D.S.C., R.N.A.S. was awarded a second bar to his Distinguished Service Cross (DSC):

"For ability and determination when leading offensive patrols, in which he displays entire disregard of personal danger.

"On the 1st January, 1918, he observed a new type twin-tailed two-seater enemy machine, which he attacked, firing a good many rounds at point blank range. The enemy machine dived, but was again attacked and went down vertically with his engine full on. The wings came off, and the machine was observed to crash. Later in the day Flt. Cdr. Compston observed two formations of ten and five Albatross scouts respectively. He attacked one of the enemy machines and sent it down in a flat spin and falling over sideways completely out of control.

"On numerous other occasions Flt. Cdr. Compston has destroyed or driven down enemy machines completely out of control, and has frequently had more than one successful engagement in the same day."

— London Gazette

- 3 June 1918 Captain Robert John Orton, DSC was awarded the Distinguished Flying Cross on the occasion of the King's Birthday for Distinguished Service.
