= Erlon =

- Commune
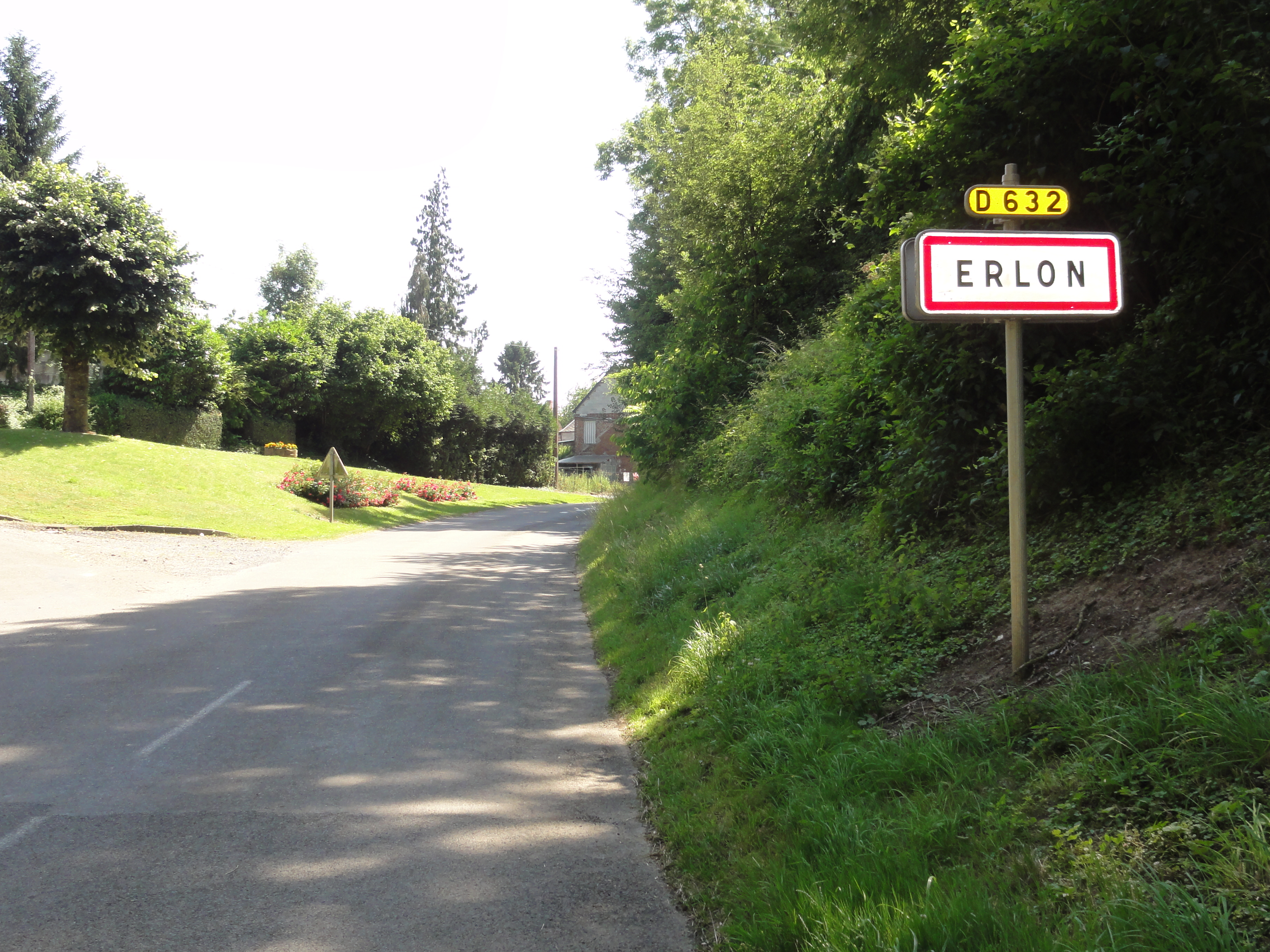
- The road into Erlon
- Location of Erlon
- Location within France Location within Hauts-de-France
- Coordinates: 49°43′48″N 3°42′53″E
- Country: France
- Region: Hauts-de-France
- Department: Aisne
- Arrondissement: Laon
- Canton: Marle
- Intercommunality: Pays de la Serre

Government
  - Mayor (2026–32): Louise Dupont
- Area^{1}: 8.9 km^{2} (3.4 sq mi)
- Elevation: 88 m (289 ft)
- Highest elevation: 136 m (446 ft)
- Lowest elevation: 68 m (223 ft)
- Population (2023): 278
  - Density: 31/km^{2} (81/sq mi)
- Time zone: UTC+01:00 (CET)
  - Summer (DST): UTC+02:00 (CEST)
- INSEE/Postal code: 02283 /02250
- ^{1} French Land Register data, which excludes lakes, ponds, glaciers > 1 km^{2} (0.386 sq mi or 247 acres) and river estuaries.

Erlon (French pronunciation: [ɛʁlɔ̃]) is a commune in the Aisne department in Hauts-de-France in northern France.

== Population ==
Historical population
Year	Pop.	±% p.a.
1968	224	—
1975	241	+1.05%
1982	255	+0.81%
1990	269	+0.67%
1999	300	+1.22%
2007	289	−0.47%
2012	291	+0.14%
2017	284	−0.49%
2023	278	−0.36%
Source: INSEE

== See also ==
- Communes of the Aisne department
