= Peter MacDougall =

Scottish World War I flying ace

Peter Aitken MacDougall
- Born: 11 August 1898; Lerwick, Shetland Islands
- Died: 18 August 1955 (aged 57); Cape Town, South Africa
- Military career
- Allegiance: United Kingdom
- Branch: British Army; Royal Air Force
- Service years: 1916–1919
- Rank: Lieutenant
- Nickname: Pat
- Unit: No. 24 Squadron RFC
- Conflicts: World War I; Western Front
- Awards: Military Cross
- Other work: Employee of the Hongkong and Shanghai Bank

Lieutenant Peter Aitken MacDougall (or McDougal) MC (11 August 1898 – 18 August 1955) was a Scottish World War I flying ace credited with seven aerial victories.

== Biography ==
MacDougall was born in Lerwick, the son of Major Peter MacDougall, a schoolmaster at the Central Public School, and his wife Florence. After leaving school he worked for the Union Bank of Scotland, before joining the Royal Flying Corps as a cadet in 1917, and being commissioned as a temporary second lieutenant (on probation) on 21 June. He was confirmed in his rank and appointed a flying officer on 23 August.

MacDougall was posted to No. 24 Squadron RFC. He was reported as being wounded in action in early November 1917, but gained his first aerial victory on the 15th of that month, flying an Airco DH.5 single-seat fighter, driving down out of control an Albatros D.III over Diksmuide.

No. 24 Squadron was then re-equipped with S.E.5 fighters, and on 19 February 1918, MacDougall and Lieutenants Andrew Cowper, Ronald T. Mark, and Reuben Hammersley shared in the downing of a Rumpler C over Servais and a DFW C over Bernot. Two days later, on 21 February, he drove down an Albatros D.V south of Honnecourt, and on the 26th he destroyed a Fokker Dr.I east of Laon. On 6 March he drove down another D.V east of St. Quentin, and destroyed a Type C reconnaissance aircraft south-east of St. Quentin on the 12th. He was reported wounded in action for a second time at the end of March.

MacDougall was awarded the Military Cross, which was gazetted on 10 May 1918. His citation read:

Temporary Second Lieutenant Peter Aitken MacDougall, General List and Royal Flying Corps.

"For conspicuous gallantry and devotion to duty. He always showed great initiative and skill in attacking enemy aircraft, and drove down or destroyed several enemy machines. On one occasion while on patrol he encountered three enemy two-seater machines, and, though his engine was giving trouble, he attacked them single-handed and drove one of them down out of control, having shot the observer. On another occasion, after driving down an enemy machine, he attacked and silenced a battery of six guns which were firing on our machines. His example of pluck and determination was of the utmost value to the squadron."

MacDougall was eventually transferred to the RAF's unemployed list on 29 April 1919. He then returned to his career in banking, working for the Hongkong and Shanghai Bank in London, China, Thailand, the Malay States, and Ceylon. He retired in 1951, and settled in Cape Town, South Africa, where he died four years later in 1955.
