= Herbert Richardson (RAF officer) =

British flying ace

Herbert Brian Richardson
- Born: 27 May 1898; Ashford, Kent, England
- Died: 14 February 1922 (aged 23); Cuatro Vientos, Spain
- Military career
- Allegiance: United Kingdom
- Branch: British Army; Royal Air Force
- Service years: 1917–1919; 1920–1921
- Rank: Lieutenant
- Unit: No. 24 Squadron RFC/RAF
- Awards: Military Cross

Lieutenant Herbert Brian Richardson MC (27 May 1898 – 14 February 1922) was a British World War I flying ace credited with 15 aerial victories.

== Military career ==
Richardson joined the Royal Flying Corps as a cadet, and was commissioned as a temporary second lieutenant (on probation) on 21 June 1917. He was confirmed in his rank and appointed a flying officer on 17 September 1917.

Richardson was posted to No. 24 Squadron in northern France to fly the SE.5a single-seat fighter, and between 18 February and 4 April 1918 was credited with nine enemy aircraft destroyed (two shared), and six driven down out of control (one shared).

His award of the Military Cross was gazetted on 21 June 1918, his citation reading:

Temporary Second Lieutenant Herbert Brian Richardson, General List and Royal Flying Corps.

"For conspicuous gallantry and devotion to duty. While on patrol he attacked a formation of eight enemy aeroplanes, one of which he destroyed. On another occasion he engaged two enemy two-seater machines, and destroyed one of them. He has destroyed six enemy machines and driven down five others out of control, and has done valuable work in attacking enemy troops on the ground. He consistently displayed great courage and skill."

Richardson was transferred to the RAF's unemployed list on 10 June 1919, but briefly returned to active service, being granted a short service commission with the rank of flying officer on 23 September 1920, which he resigned on 18 May 1921.

Richardson was killed in a flying accident in Cuatro Vientos, Spain, on 14 February 1922.

== List of aerial victories ==
Combat record
No.	Date/Time	Aircraft/ Serial No.	Opponent	Result	Location	Notes
1	18 February 1918 @ 1430	S.E.5a (C1057)	Pfalz D.III	Out of control	East of St. Quentin	
2	26 February 1918 @ 0840-0900	S.E.5a (B124)	Fokker Dr.I	Out of control	East of Laon	
3	26 February 1918 @ 0840-0900	S.E.5a (B124)	Fokker Dr.I	Destroyed	East of Samoussy	Shared with Lieutenants Ian McDonald & Ronald Mark, and Second Lieutenants James Dawe & W. F. Poulter.
4	6 March 1918 @ 1055	S.E.5a (B124)	Fokker Dr.I	Destroyed	Fontaine-Croin	
5	11 March 1918 @ 1315	S.E.5a (C1070)	Type C	Out of control	East of Bellenglise	Shared with Captain Alfred Brown, Lieutenants Ronald Mark & E. W. Lindeburg, and Second Lieutenant P. J. Nolan.
6	11 March 1918 @ 1815	S.E.5a (C1070)	Albatros D.V	Out of control	Ribemont	
7	15 March 1918 @ 1020	S.E.5a (B8257)	Rumpler C	Destroyed	North of Premonte	Shared with Lieutenants Andrew Cowper & Ronald Mark.
8	16 March 1918 @ 1630	S.E.5a (B176)	Albatros D.V	Destroyed	Barisis	
9	17 March 1918 @ 1825	S.E.5a (D279)	Pfalz D.III	Out of control	South-west of Ramicourt	
10	21 March 1918 @ 1415-1420	S.E.5a (D279)	Pfalz D.III	Out of control	Bellicourt	
11	21 March 1918 @ 1415-1420	S.E.5a (D279)	Pfalz D.III	Destroyed	Bellicourt	
12	21 March 1918 @ 1415-1420	S.E.5a (D279)	Pfalz D.III	Destroyed	Bellicourt	
13	22 March 1918 @ 1600-1700	S.E.5a (D279)	Pfalz D.III	Destroyed	Péronne	
14	26 March 1918 @ 1430	S.E.5a (D279)	Type C	Destroyed	Dreslincourt	
15	4 April 1918 @ 1530	S.E.5a (D279)	Type C	Destroyed in flames	Warfusée-Abancourt	

== Bibliography ==
- Franks, Norman (2007). SE 5/5a Aces of World War I. Oxford, UK: Osprey Publishing. ISBN 978-1-84603-180-9.
