= Reuben Hammersley =

Reuben George Hammersley
- Born: 26 September 1897; Leicester, England
- Died: Unknown; Southern Rhodesia
- Military career
- Allegiance: United Kingdom
- Branch: British Army; Royal Air Force
- Service years: 1917–1919
- Rank: Captain
- Unit: No. 24 Squadron RFC/RAF
- Conflicts: World War I • Western Front
- Awards: Croix de Guerre (France)

Captain Reuben George Hammersley (26 September 1897 – after 1940) was an English World War I flying ace credited with eight aerial victories.

== Biography ==
Hammersley was born in Leicester, and worked as a Boot factor in Measham before the war. He learned to fly, receiving Royal Aero Club Aviator's Certificate No. 3556 on a Caudron biplane at Wallisdown School, Bournemouth, on 14 September 1916, then joined the Royal Flying Corps as a cadet, being commissioned as a temporary second lieutenant (on probation) on 3 May 1917, and was confirmed in his rank on 27 July.

He was posted to No. 24 Squadron in France, flying an S.E.5a. He gained his first victories on 19 February 1918, when he and Lieutenants Peter MacDougall, Ronald T. Mark and Andrew Cowper, shot down two aircraft over Servais and Bernot. Hammersley went on to account for six more enemy aircraft between 26 February and 20 May 1918, for a total of eight.

On 1 September 1918 he was appointed a flight commander with the acting rank of captain, and later the same month was awarded the Croix de guerre by France.

Hammersley left the RAF after the war, being transferred to the unemployed list on 25 January 1919.
