= Alfred John Brown =

British World War I flying ace

- Born: 1897; Deal, Kent
- Died: After 16 May 1919
- Military career
- Allegiance: United Kingdom
- Branch: British Army; Royal Air Force
- Rank: Captain
- Units: Royal Sussex Regiment; No. 24 Squadron RAF; No. 23 Squadron RAF
- Conflicts: World War I
- Awards: Military Cross

Captain Alfred John Brown MC was a World War I flying ace credited with eight aerial victories.

== Early life ==
Alfred John Brown was apparently from Sussex, England, as evidenced by his service in the Royal Sussex Regiment.

== World War I ==
On 3 March 1917, second lieutenant A. J. Brown was seconded from the Royal Sussex Regiment to the Royal Flying Corps. He became a flight commander in No. 24 Squadron in December 1917. (Appointment to command a flight customarily carried a temporary promotion to the rank of captain.)

On 11 January 1918, he was promoted to lieutenant and stayed seconded. By the date of his promotion, he was already a successful aerial warrior with two victories to his credit while flying an Airco DH.5. He would score five more quick victories in early March 1918 while flying a Royal Aircraft Factory SE.5a. On 15 March, he was withdrawn from combat for a rest.

His aerial victory exploits were not the only feats responsible for his earning the Military Cross, which was gazetted on 22 June 1918:

2nd Lieutenant (Temporary Captain) Alfred John Brown, Royal Sussex Regiment, and Royal Flying Corps.

"For conspicuous gallantry and devotion to duty. While on patrol work he and his patrol attacked two enemy two-seater machines, one of which was driven down out of control, the other being seriously damaged. On the following day he attacked a hostile reconnaissance machine, which he forced to land in our lines. On a later occasion he volunteered to attack a hostile aerodrome in foggy weather. He dropped four bombs from a height of 200 feet which blew in the sides of one of the hangars, and then attacked horse and motor transport on the road, finally engaging enemy troops in the main street of a village with machine-gun fire. He has shown great skill and daring as a leader of offensive patrols."

Following the Military Cross award, he would upgrade to flying a Sopwith Dolphin for No. 23 Squadron and score one final victory. His ending victory total for the war was two enemy planes destroyed, and six sent down out of control.

On 31 August 1918, he was one of three members of his patrol that were shot down. He survived the crash landing.

== List of aerial victories ==
No.	Date/Time	Aircraft	Foe	Result	Location	Notes
1	21 September 1917 @ 1705 hours	Airco DH.5 serial number B362	Albatros D.V	Destroyed	Between Anneux and Rumilly, Pas-de-Calais, France	
2	10 December 1917 @ 1200 hours	Airco DH.5 s/n B4918	Albatros D.V	Driven down out of control	Honnecourt-sur-Escaut, France	
3	6 March 1918 @ 1015 hours	Royal Aircraft Factory SE.5a s/n C9494	Albatros D.V	Driven down out of control	Saint Quentin, France	Victory shared with Andrew Cowper
4	11 March 1918 @ 1315 hours	Royal Aircraft Factory SE.5a s/n C9494	German reconnaissance plane	Driven down out of control	East of Bellenglise, France	Victory shared with Herbert Richardson, Ronald Mark, two other pilots
5	11 March 1918 @ 1815 hours	Royal Aircraft Factory SE.5a s/n C9494	Pfalz D.III	Driven down out of control	Ribemont, France	
6	12 March 1918 @ 1840 hours	Royal Aircraft Factory SE.5a s/n C9494	German airplane	Destroyed	Southwest of Saint Quentin, France	
7	13 March 1918 @ 1245 hours	Royal Aircraft Factory SE.5a s/n C9494	Albatros D.V	Driven down out of control	Bellecourt, France	
8	23 August 1918 @ 1859 hours	Sopwith Dolphin s/n D3732	DFW two-seater	Driven down out of control	Between Maricourt and Suzanne, France	Victory shared with two other pilots

== Post World War I ==
A. J. Brown MC was confirmed in rank as a captain in the Administrative Branch effective 28 November 1918.

On 12 March 1919, Captain A. J. Brown MC "of the flying branch" resigned his commission because of poor health; however, he retained his rank.

On 2 May 1919, A. J. Brown MC resigned his commission in the Sussex Regiment because of illness, but kept the honorary rank of Lieutenant. However, on 16 May, this resignation was cancelled.

Nothing more is known of Alfred John Brown.
