= Ian Donald Roy McDonald =

British World War I flying ace

- Born: 9 September 1898; Saint John's, Antigua, British West Indies
- Died: 22 September 1920 (aged 22); Dangatora, Iraq
- Burial place: Basra Memorial, Basra, Iraq
- Military career
- Allegiance: United Kingdom
- Branch: British Army; Royal Air Force
- Service years: 1916–1922
- Rank: Captain
- Units: No 39 Squadron RFC; No. 24 Squadron RAF
- Awards: Military Cross; Distinguished Flying Cross

Captain Ian Donald Roy McDonald MC, DFC (9 September 1898 – 22 September 1920) was a British World War I flying ace credited with 20 aerial victories. Although born in the British West Indies, he travelled to England to serve in the Royal Flying Corps. After his successful career in combat, he spent a short time at home before returning to the colours. He served in Iraq postwar, and was executed there by insurgents.

== Early life ==
Although McDonald was born in the Caribbean, he was a British citizen. His father was a legislator.

== World War I service ==
McDonald joined the Royal Flying Corps in 1916 and became a fighter pilot. On 26 April 1917, he was appointed a flying officer with the rank of temporary second lieutenant. He was first assigned to 39 (Home Defence) Squadron. From there, he transferred to A Flight, 24 Squadron on 11 July 1917. Flying an Airco DH.5, he scored his first three victories between 30 November and 10 December 1917. Then the squadron upgraded to Royal Aircraft Factory SE.5as. McDonald began to score with his new machine; his second victory on 26 February 1918, shared with Ronald T. Mark, Herbert Richardson, and three other pilots, made McDonald an ace.

McDonald missed scoring in March, but was appointed as a flight commander with the rank of temporary captain on the 15th. He tallied six wins in April, four in May, and three in the first week in June. Then, on 17 June, teaming with Horace Barton, George Owen Johnson, and C. E. Walton, he forced down into captivity one of Germany's leading aces, Kurt Wüsthoff. He had become the squadron's second scoring ace.

== List of aerial victories ==
Combat record
| No. | Date/time | Aircraft/ Serial No. | Foe | Result | Location | Notes |
|---|---|---|---|---|---|---|
| 1 | 15 November 1917 @ 1330 hours | DH.5 s/n A9471 | Albatros D.III | Driven down out of control | Southeast of Diksmuide, Belgium | |
| 2 | 30 December 1917 @ 1235 hours | DH.5 s/n A9339 | German reconnaissance aircraft | Driven down out of control | Fontaine | |
| 3 | 10 December 1917 @ 1200 hours | DH.5 s/n A9257 | Albatros D.V | Destroyed | South of Honnecourt-sur-Escaut, France | |
| 4 | 26 February 1918 @ 0840 hours | SE.5a s/n C1057 | Fokker Triplane | Destroyed | East of Laon, France | |
| 5 | 26 February 1918 @ 0900 hours | SE.5a s/n C1057 | Fokker Triplane | Destroyed | East of Samoussy, France | Victory shared with Ronald Mark, Herbert Richardson, James Dawe, two other pilots |
| 6 | 7 April 1918 @ 1550 hours | SE.5a s/n C9613 | Albatros D.V | Destroyed | Bois de Moreuil, France | |
| 7 | 11 April 1918 @ 1655 hours | SE.5a s/n C9613 | LVG reconnaissance aircraft | Driven down out of control | Villers-Bretonneux, France | |
| 8 | 12 April 1918 @ 1615 hours | SE.5a s/n C9613 | Albatros D.V | Destroyed | Between Hangard and Moreuil, France | |
| 9 | 12 April 1918 @ 1615 hours | SE.5a s/n C9613 | Albatros D.V | Driven down out of control | Between Hangard and Moreuil, France | |
| 10 | 20 April 1918 @ 0955 hours | SE.5a s/n C9613 | Pfalz D.III | Destroyed | South of Morcourt, France | |
| 11 | 23 April 1918 @ 1445 hours | SE.5a s/n C9613 | Pfalz D.III | Destroyed | South of Warfusée | |
| 12 | 3 May 1918 @ 1835 hours | SE.5a s/n C9613 | Fokker Triplane | Destroyed | Le Quesnel, France | |
| 13 | 16 May 1918 @ 0615 hours | SE.5a s/n D279 | Albatros D.V | Driven down out of control | Foucaucourt, France | |
| 14 | 28 May 1918 @ 0600 hours | SE.5a s/n D3444 | Fokker D.VII | Driven down out of control | Maricourt, France | |
| 15 | 31 May 1918 @ 1730 hours | SE.5a s/n D3444 | Albatros D.V | Destroyed | Becquigny, France | |
| 16 | 2 June 1918 @ 1115 hours | SE.5a s/n D3444 | Siemens-Schuckert D.III | Destroyed | Contoire, France | |
| 17 | 3 June 1918 @ 1120 hours | SE.5a s/n D3444 | Albatros reconnaissance aircraft | Destroyed | Southeast of Marcelcave, France | Victory shared with James Dawe |
| 18 | 5 June 1918 @ 0805 hours | SE.5a s/n D3444 | Observation balloon | Destroyed | Moreuil, France | |
| 19 | 7 June 1918 @ 1145 hours | SE.5a s/n D3444 | Fokker Triplane | Destroyed | Rosières, France | |
| 20 | 17 June 1918 @ 1200 hours | SE.5a s/n D3444 | Fokker D.VII | Forced down and captured | Cachy, France | Victory over Blue Max winner Kurt Wusthoff shared with Horace Barton, George Owen Johnson, C. E. Walton |

== Post World War I ==
He exited the Royal Air Force in early 1919 and went home to Antigua, due to suffering from eye strain. He then returned to the RAF, gaining a permanent commission as a lieutenant on 1 August 1919 and becoming an instructor at RAF Cranwell. In 1920, he was assigned to flight operations in Iraq. On 22 September 1920, he flew DH.9a no. F2838 on a relief expedition to drop food to a stranded boat, the Greenfly. He was shot down by ground fire at Samawahon, and seen to wade ashore. He was executed at Dangatora. He is commemorated on Panels 43 and 64 of the Basra Memorial.

== Honours and awards ==
Distinguished Flying Cross
Lt. (temp. Capt.) Ian Donald Roy McDonald, M.C.

"A dashing, fighting pilot. In the past two months he has destroyed five enemy machines and brought down two others out of control. At all times he shows a fine offensive spirit and complete disregard of danger."

Military Cross
Lt. Ian Donald Roy McDonald, R.A.F.

"For conspicuous gallantry and devotion to duty. With seven scouts he attacked eighteen enemy machines, of which three were destroyed and one driven down completely out of control. When driven down to within 200 feet of the ground by two enemy machines owing to a choked engine, he turned on them and drove one down. He has in all destroyed eleven enemy aircraft and carried out valuable work in attacking enemy troops on the ground."
