= Ronald T. Mark =

British flying ace

Ronald Turnbull Mark
- Born: 28 January 1898; Newcastle upon Tyne, England
- Died: 16 December 1958 (aged 60); Chipping Norton, Oxfordshire
- Military career
- Allegiance: United Kingdom
- Branch: British Army; Royal Air Force
- Service years: 1917–1919; 1940–1945
- Rank: Wing Commander
- Unit: No. 24 Squadron
- Conflicts: First World War; Western Front; Second World War
- Awards: Officer of the Order of the British Empire; Military Cross & Bar; Mentioned in Despatches

Ronald Turnbull Mark, OBE, MC & Bar (28 January 1898 – 16 December 1958) was a British flying ace of the First World War who was credited with 14 aerial victories.

== First World War ==
Mark joined the Royal Flying Corps as a temporary second lieutenant (on probation), and was confirmed in his rank on 20 October 1917. In January 1918 he was posted to No. 24 Squadron on the Western Front to fly the SE.5a single-seat fighter.

His first aerial victory came at 0830 hours on 18 February 1918, when Mark, Horace Barton and Andrew Cowper drove a German DFW two-seater reconnaissance aircraft down out of control. He scored his second win later that same day, driving a Pfalz D.III fighter down out of control. The next morning, ten minutes combat saw Mark help Cowper, Reuben Hammersley, and Peter MacDougall burn another DFW reconnaissance aircraft and destroy a Rumpler two-seater. On the 26th, Mark shared with Ian Donald Roy McDonald, Herbert Richardson, and four other British pilots in the destruction of a new Fokker Dr.I triplane fighter. Mark was now an ace. By checking internal evidence to Mark's victory list, these seem to have been the days described in the citation for his first Military Cross:

T./2nd Lt. Ronald Turnbull Mark, Gen. List and R.F.C. For conspicuous gallantry and devotion to duty. He showed great determination and resource during operations in attacking enemy troops and transport with machine gun fire. Observing some enemy transport in a village, he attacked it repeatedly and caused it to stampede. While on an offensive patrol he attacked and destroyed an enemy two-seater machine. He has destroyed one other enemy machine and driven down others out of control.

On 11 March, Mark, Herbert Richardson, Alfred John Brown, and two other pilots drove down a two-seater. Two days later, Mark repeated the feat, but single-handed. Two days after that, he teamed with Richardson and Cowper to destroy an observation aircraft. By 3 May, he had run his string to 14, sharing a victory each with Conway Farrell and Cyril Lowe. On 21 May, he took off on the sortie described in his citation for a second award of the Military Cross:

T./2nd Lt. Ronald Turnbull Mark, M.C., Gen. List, and R.A.F. For conspicuous gallantry and devotion to duty. This officer and another pilot were escorting a formation of machines engaged on bombing a village, when seven enemy scouts attacked the bombers. They both attacked these scouts, but at the outset the other pilot's machine was set on fire, and 2nd Lt. Mark's right-hand top plane broke. During the fight that ensued each came to the rescue of the other. 2nd Lt. Mark first caused the other pilot's pursuer to break off his attack, and then the other pilot shot down the scout attacking 2nd Lt. Mark. The action of both these officers, in practically unmanoeuvrable machines, in coming to the rescue of each other in turn showed courage and self-sacrifice of a very high order.

Unmentioned is the finale; Mark's crash landing of his damaged aircraft set it afire. Somehow he survived unscathed. Mark was appointed a temporary captain on 1 September 1918, and eventually left the RAF, relinquishing his commission on 9 April 1919.

== Second World War ==
On 2 April 1940, Mark was granted a commission in the Royal Air Force Volunteer Reserve as a pilot officer on probation "for the duration of hostilities". Exactly one year later, he was confirmed in his rank. On 9 February 1941 he was granted the war substantive rank of flying officer, and was promoted to squadron leader in the Administrative and Special Duties Branch on 1 October 1943. By 1 January 1945, when Mark received a mentioned in despatches and was made an Officer of the Order of the British Empire, he held the acting rank of wing commander.

== Later life ==
Mark married Gwendoline Maud Rainbow in 1928.

Post-war Mark pursued a career as in business. On 28 May 1948, he, Elsie Brooks and William Stanley Rainbow bought William Bell Rope and Twine Merchants in Edinburgh. Mark was the chairman of the Forster Tobacco Company Ltd. of Newcastle upon Tyne, when it was sold in February 1956.

He died in 1958.

== Bibliography ==
- Shores, Christopher F.; Franks, Norman & Guest, Russell F. (1990). Above the Trenches: a Complete Record of the Fighter Aces and Units of the British Empire Air Forces 1915–1920. London, UK: Grub Street. ISBN 978-0-948817-19-9.
