= Conway Farrell =

Canadian flying ace during World War I

Conway MacAllister Gray Farrell
- Born: 22 May 1898; Smiths Falls, Ontario, Canada
- Died: 31 March 1988 (aged 89); Ganges, British Columbia, Canada
- Military career
- Allegiance: Canada
- Branch: Royal Flying Corps; Royal Canadian Air Force
- Rank: Group Captain
- Nickname: "Con"
- Units: No. 24 Squadron RAF, No. 56 Squadron RAF
- Awards: Distinguished Flying Cross
- Other work: Bush pilot in Canada in 1930s

Captain Conway MacAllister Gray Farrell (1898–1988) was a Canadian flying ace during World War I. He was credited with seven aerial victories.

Post World War I, he would become a well-known bush pilot in Canada during the 1930s; he was one of Canada's first air mail pilots. He would leave this pioneering aviation behind him to return to service during World War II, rising to group captain.

Post World War II, he would join Canadian Pacific Air Lines, becoming first Manager of Repairs for them, Manager of Operations for the Orient.

== Personal life ==
Conway MacAllister Gray Farrell was born on 22 May 1898 in Smiths Falls, Ontario, Canada. From 1906–1916, he was schooled in Moose Jaw, Saskatchewan, Canada.

After his service during World War I, he married and fathered a daughter.

He died on 31 March 1988 in Ganges, British Columbia, Canada.

== World War I ==
Farrell joined the Royal Flying Corps during World War I; he was commissioned on 13 October 1917, and confirmed as a second lieutenant on 29 October 1917. On 11 February 1918, he was far enough along in pilot's training that he entered gunnery school at RAF Turnberry.

He was posted to combat duty as a SE.5a fighter pilot with 24 Squadron on 11 March 1918. On 23 March at 1815 hours, he scored his first aerial victory, joining Andrew Cowper and another pilot in destroying a Rumpler reconnaissance plane over Nesle, France. At 1730 hours on 4 April, he would team with Ronald Mark to capture a Rumpler. The evening of 16 May 1918 would see him triumph over a German fighter, as he drove down an Albatros D.V out of control over Foucaucourt, France at 1915 hours. Then, at 0730 hours on 26 July 1918, he would cooperate with Horace Barton and three other pilots to capture a DFW two-seater at Royaucourt, France for Farrell's fourth victory.

August 1918 would be a hectic month for Farrell. At 0900 hours on the 4th, he and Barton would destroy a DFW over Suzanne, France; at 1005 hours, Farrell drove another DFW down out of control over Fricourt. On 8 August, Farrell flew noteworthy trench strafing and reconnaissance missions; his citation for a Distinguished Flying Cross specifically mentioned that he machine-gunned and bombed both enemy transport and soldiers, silenced a German machine gun, and attacked a supply dump, as well as rendering a valuable report on enemy dispositions. Although he would score one more victory, destroying a Fokker D.VII northeast of Le Quesnoy at 1400 hours on 10 August, the ground attack missions were the prime reasons he was awarded the DFC on 22 August 1918. Five days later, he was appointed a captain, with the promotion to take effect on 2 September. On 29 August 1918, Farrell was transferred to 56 Squadron as a flight commander.

The DFC citation mentioned that Farrell had been shot down in a meeting engagement with 40 enemy planes after 10 August; no date was mentioned, but it obviously must have been well before 22 August 1918.

Farrell served with 56 Squadron until he was injured on 6 October 1918. He was medically evacuated to England on 8 October. His Distinguished Flying Cross became official when it was gazetted on 2 November 1918.

== Post World War I ==
Conway Farrell was discharged on 13 April 1919. He returned to Canada and majored in arts and medicine at University of Manitoba in Winnipeg. He was a bush pilot from 1920–1939, including being one of the first Canadian air mail pilots on the Cranberry Portage-Kississing Lake route in 1920, and still active on the Moose Jaw-Edmonton route in 1930.

He returned to military service, joining the Royal Canadian Air Force for World War II. On 4 October 1939 he was posted to No. 4 Squadron RCAF as squadron leader. He served at No. 1 Training Wing in Ontario, and Trenton, Ontario, as well in British Columbia at Bella Bella, and Sea Island. He was promoted to acting group captain in May 1943.

Post WWII, he worked for Canadian Pacific Air Lines. In 1951 he became their manager of repairs. He became their manager of operations for the Orient, stationed in Tokyo, in 1954.
