= Kurt Wüsthoff =

German fighter ace

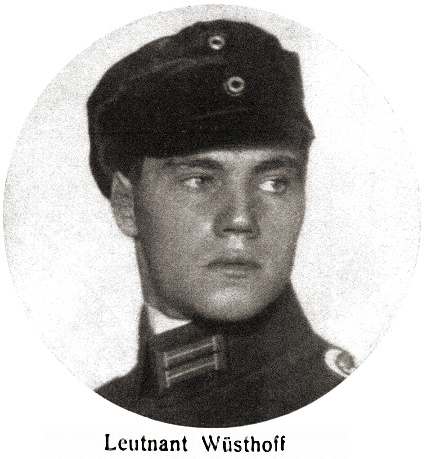
- Leutnant Kurt Wuesthoff
- Born: 27 January 1897; Aachen, Germany
- Died: 23 July 1926 (aged 29); Dresden, Germany
- Military career
- Allegiance: German Empire
- Branch: Luftstreitkräfte
- Service years: 1913–1918
- Rank: Leutnant
- Units: Kampfgeschwader 1 Jagdstaffel 4 Jagdstaffel 15
- Commands: Jagdstaffel 4 Jagdstaffel 15
- Awards: Pour le Mérite; Royal House Order of Hohenzollern; Iron Cross

Leutnant Kurt Wüsthoff (27 January 1897 – 23 July 1926) was a German fighter ace credited with 27 listed confirmed victories during World War I. Enlisting prewar at age 16 1/2, after learning to fly during the events leading to the war's start, he was posted as a flight instructor until adjudged old enough for combat. He then flew two-seater reconnaissance craft for a year and a half during 1916 and 1917 before training as a fighter pilot in June 1917. Assigned to Jagdstaffel 4, he shot down 24 enemy airplanes and three observation balloons between 15 June 1917 and 10 March 1918. Promoted to command of his squadron on 10 January 1918, he proved immature and plagued by combat stress reaction. Relieved of his post on 16 March 1918 by Manfred von Richthofen, he returned to combat duty with Jagdstaffel 15 in June, only to be shot down and captured on the 17th. He survived the war and a long convalescence, only to die after crashing while performing aerobatics on 18 July 1926. He died of his injuries five days later.

== Early life ==
Kurt Wüsthoff was born in Aachen on 27 January 1897. His father was a music director.

== Entry into military service ==
He joined the German air service at age 16½, in mid 1913. By the time young Wüsthoff qualified to fly two-seater reconnaissance aircraft, hostilities had broken out. Deemed too young for combat duty, he was assigned as a flight instructor in Flieger-Ersatz-Abteilung 6 (FEA 6).

When old enough for combat duty, Wüsthoff served on the Western Front with Kampfgeschwader I (KG I) over Verdun and the Somme in 1916. When KG I moved east, Wüsthoff got his chance to fly observation and bombing missions in Bulgaria, Rumania, Macedonia, and Greece.

== Fighter service ==
By June 1917, Wüsthoff had been promoted to Vizefeldwebel. He transferred to fighter service with a Prussian squadron, Jagdstaffel 4 (Jasta 4), under the command of Oberleutnant Kurt-Bertram von Döring. The squadron was part of Germany's original fighter wing, von Richthofen's Flying Circus.

Wüsthoff scored his first aerial victory on 15 June 1917, shooting down a Sopwith 1½ Strutter near Vormezeele, Belgium. He wrote to his mother:

"Life is just brilliant here--more dangerous, mind you, as all hell has broken loose in the air and on the ground....I hope to shoot down some alone soon because it is boring flying with others."

He then shot down three observation balloons on three different days, and followed them up with a Sopwith Camel on 20 July, making him an ace in just over a month. The last day of July saw his sixth confirmed triumph.

He was commissioned as a leutnant on 1 August. He scored only once in August, then ran off a string of 14 victories in September, ending the month with 21 victories making him a quadruple ace. His 20th victory qualified him for Germany's highest award for valor, the Pour le Mérite.

He shot down two more enemy aircraft in October, and three in November. His 9 November victory was his 26th enemy aircraft shot down. He was awarded the Pour le Mérite on 22 November 1917, having previously been awarded the Iron Cross and the Royal House Order of Hohenzollern.

== Wüsthoff in command ==
His rapid rise to fame came with a price, however. The teenage ace began struggling with severe emotional and physical problems. He was also beginning to suffer from the stress of battle fatigue, and it was causing him stomach problems. While his first tenure as acting commander was fleeting, from 12 through 20 December 1917, he was appointed Staffelführer (squadron leader) permanently on 19 January 1918. He held the post for two months, until 16 March. Granting Wüsthoff command of the squadron inflamed many of his fellow fliers; they felt their youngest member was pushy, over-ambitious, a glory-hunter prone to lone expeditions. Wüsthoff's personality clashes were not the only thing wrong with his leadership; he failed to lead by example, not scoring in battle. He finally shot down his 27th and final listed victim on 10 March 1918, after a four-month lapse in victories. Two days later, he claimed a victory that was confirmed, but not added to his victory list.

On 16 March, his immediate superior, Manfred von Richthofen, who had little sympathy for non-performers, relieved him from command. As his successor Hans-Georg von der Osten remarked, "He was the youngest—very much younger than all his pilots—and he had a very cheeky way. Apart from not being a very sympathetic man, he reported victories he did not always check." Wüsthoff was temporarily given a desk job in the wing's headquarters. He left the wing altogether on 4 May and was sent from the front back to Doctor Lahmann's care for his combat fatigue.

== Captivity ==
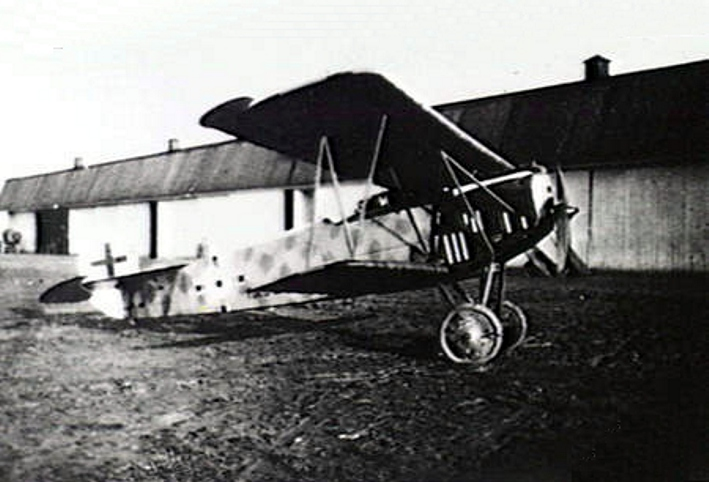
A typical Fokker D.VII. Wüsthoff was flying a borrowed D.VII when he was shot down.

On 16 June, he returned to duty as commander of another Prussian squadron, Jagdstaffel 15 (Jasta 15). He borrowed the Fokker D.VII of Georg von Hantelmann to fly a patrol the following day. He engaged a Royal Air Force flight of four SE.5's of No. 24 Squadron RAF. Ian McDonald, Horace Barton, George Owen Johnson, and C. E. Barton forced Wüsthoff down in the vicinity of Cachy, France.

Wüsthoff, who was seriously wounded in both legs and taken prisoner, was treated in various French hospitals. He complained bitterly about the inadequacy of his treatment.

== Post war ==
Wüsthoff remained in French captivity until 1920, spending much of that time in hospital. When he was finally released, he was on crutches. Repatriated to a Dresden hospital, over a two-year span he eventually improved to the point he could walk again without crutches. He found a job with an Austrian car maker. Wüsthoff returned to aviation and flew for advertising campaigns.

On 18 July 1926, he flew in a memorial show to Max Immelmann in Dresden. He crashed while performing aerobatics. On 23 July 1926, Wüsthoff succumbed to his injuries.
