= Cyril Lowe =

British World War I flying ace and rugby union footballer

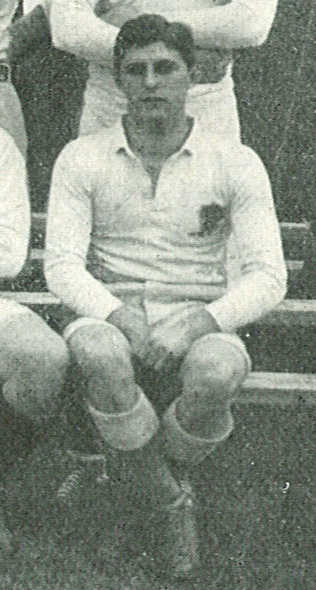
- Born: Cyril Nelson Lowe; 7 October 1891 Holbeach, Lincolnshire, England
- Died: 6 February 1983 (aged 91)
- School: Dulwich College
- University: Cambridge University

Rugby union career
- Position: Wing
Senior career
Years	Team	Apps	(Points)
1911–1913	Cambridge University		
1913–	Blackheath		
International career
Years	Team	Apps	(Points)
1913–1923	England	25	(58)
- Military career
- Allegiance: United Kingdom
- Branch: British Army; Royal Air Force
- Service years: 1914–1919; 1921–1944
- Rank: Group Captain
- Units: Army Service Corps; No. 11 Squadron RFC; No. 24 Squadron RFC/RAF
- Commands: No. 602 City of Glasgow (Bombing) Squadron AAF; No. 1 Squadron RAF; No. 6 Armoured Car Company; No. 43 (Fighter) Squadron; Oxford University Air Squadron
- Conflicts: World War I; Western Front; World War II
- Awards: Military Cross; Distinguished Flying Cross

Cyril Nelson "Kid" Lowe, MC, DFC (7 October 1891 – 6 February 1983) was an English rugby union footballer who held England's international try scoring record for over sixty years, a First World War flying ace credited with nine victories, and supposedly the inspiration for W. E. Johns' character "Biggles".

== Early life ==
Lowe was born in Holbeach, Lincolnshire. He attended Dulwich College where he was a boarder in Orchard House. He edited the school magazine, The Alleynian, from 1910 to 1911, as his fellow alumnus P. G. Wodehouse had done previously. At Dulwich, he excelled at a number of sports, and represented the school in boxing, athletics, swimming, cricket and rugby. He captained the Athletics squad in 1911 and in the same year played for the first XI cricket squad. In this same cricket side, he played alongside future England captain, Arthur Gilligan, the future Essex wicket-keeper Frank Gilligan and R. K. Nunes; the future captain of the West Indies. Eclipsing these sporting achievements was his record as a rugby player. He was in the side first XV from 1908 and was in the unbeaten first XV rugby union squad in 1909; which contained five future internationals dubbed the 'Famous Five'. These five would all go on to play in the 1913 Varsity Match, (and also produced the captains of both Oxford and Cambridge in 1919), and all of whom served in the First World War. They were Eric Loudoun-Shand and Grahame Donald who both went on to play for Scotland, W. D. Doherty who went on to play for and captain Ireland, J. E. Greenwood who went on to play for and captain England and Cyril Lowe himself. He then went on to captain the side in 1910–11. Despite his sporting prowess, Lowe was not physically imposing, standing 5 ft 8 in (1.73 m) and weighing around nine-and-a-half stone (133 lb (60 kg)) while at school. His small stature led to his nickname at school being "Tich" Lowe. He was described by the school magazine, The Alleynian, as "A first rate centre three-quarter. Very fast, with a capital pair of hands, a first-rate dodge on a dry ground, and a good pair of feet on the wet."

He went on to Pembroke College, Cambridge, where he won rugby blues in 1911, 1912 and 1913, making him a rare triple blue.

== Rugby career ==
Cyril Lowe, whilst still at Cambridge, was called up to play for England in 1913. This was to be the beginning of an international career that spanned either side of the First World War, in which he scored a record 18 tries in 25 internationals and was on the losing side only three times, twice to Wales and once to South Africa. He played in four Grand Slam-winning sides until his retirement in 1923. In 1913 and 1914 he won back-to-back Five Nation Grand Slams and his eight try haul in 1914 remains a Championship record, only ever equalled by two players, Ian Smith of Scotland in 1925, and Louis Bielle-Biarrey of France in 2025.

At club level, after leaving Cambridge, Lowe represented Blackheath, and was later the RAF representative on the Rugby Union Committee.

Lowe's sporting career was interrupted by the outbreak of hostilities in 1914. Lowe returned to his rugby career in 1920, playing for England. He retired from international rugby in 1923 with 25 caps, and would have gained more were it not for the war. His career total 18 tries remained an English record at his death and it was only equaled and later surpassed by another Royal Air Force pilot Rory Underwood in 1989, 66 years after Lowe's retirement. It has subsequently been achieved by other players, though internationals are more frequent in the modern game and are generally higher scoring.

=== International tries ===
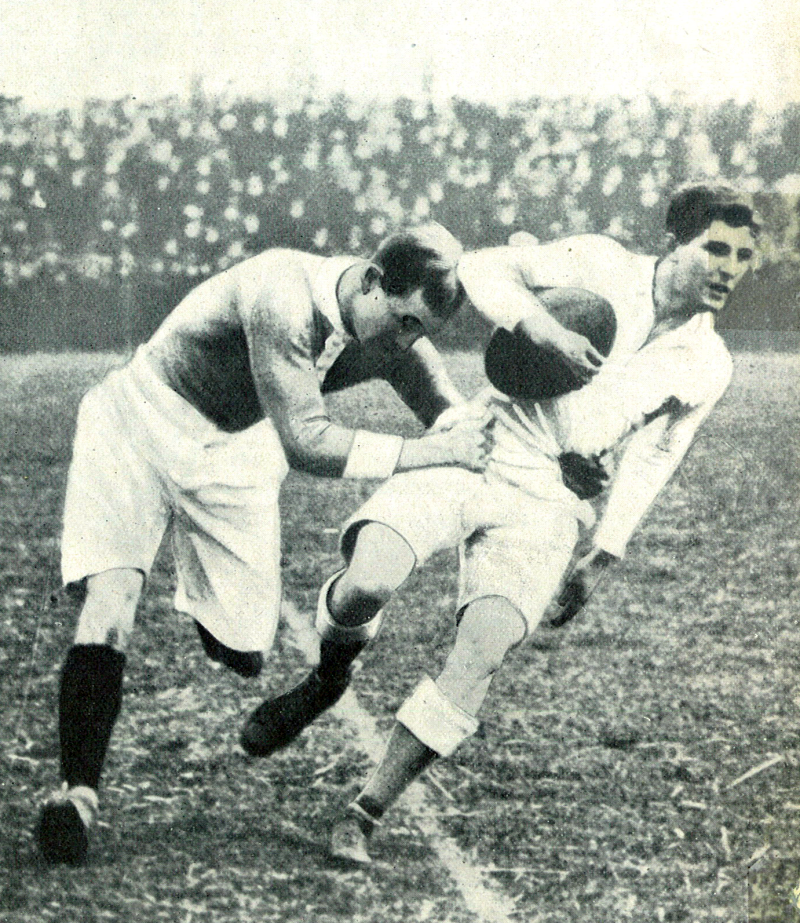
Lowe tackled by Dedet in 1913 vs France

Statistics
Try	Opposing team	Location	Venue	Competition	Date	Result
1	Ireland	Twickenham, England	Twickenham	Five Nations Championship	14 February 1914	Won
2	Ireland	Twickenham, England	Twickenham	Five Nations Championship	14 February 1914	Won
3	Scotland	Inverleith, Scotland	Inverleith	Five Nations Championship	21 March 1914	Won
4	Scotland	Inverleith, Scotland	Inverleith	Five Nations Championship	21 March 1914	Won
5	Scotland	Inverleith, Scotland	Inverleith	Five Nations Championship	21 March 1914	Won
6	France	Colombes near Paris, France	Colombes Stadium	Five Nations Championship	13 April 1914	Won
7	France	Colombes near Paris, France	Colombes Stadium	Five Nations Championship	13 April 1914	Won
8	France	Colombes near Paris, France	Colombes Stadium	Five Nations Championship	13 April 1914	Won
9	Ireland	Dublin, Ireland	Lansdowne Road	Five Nations Championship	14 February 1920	Won
10	Scotland	Twickenham, England	Twickenham	Five Nations Championship	20 March 1920	Won
11	Wales	Twickenham, England	Twickenham	Five Nations Championship	15 January 1921	Won
12	Ireland	Twickenham, England	Twickenham	Five Nations Championship	12 February 1921	Won
13	France	Colombes near Paris, France	Colombes Stadium	Five Nations Championship	28 March 1921	Won
14	Wales	Cardiff, Wales	Cardiff Arms Park	Five Nations Championship	21 January 1922	Lost
15	Ireland	Dublin, Ireland	Lansdowne Road	Five Nations Championship	11 February 1922	Won
16	Scotland	Twickenham, England	Twickenham	Five Nations Championship	18 March 1922	Won
17	Scotland	Twickenham, England	Twickenham	Five Nations Championship	18 March 1922	Won
18	Ireland	Leicester, England	Welford Road Stadium	Five Nations Championship	10 February 1923	Won

== Military career ==
=== First World War ===
Joining the army soon after the outbreak of the First World War, Lowe was commissioned into the Army Service Corps as a temporary second lieutenant on 31 August 1914. He was promoted to lieutenant on 20 January 1915, and to captain on 30 April 1916.

Lowe was transferred to the General List to serve in the Royal Flying Corps, and appointed a flying officer on 30 September 1916. He was posted to No. 11 Squadron, and was appointed a flight commander on 11 February 1917. Flying an F.E.2b with observer/gunner Second Lieutenant G. Masters, Lowe gained his first victory on 15 March 1917, destroying a Type C aircraft over Bailleul. On 24 March, he drove down out of control an Albatros D.III over Fontaine-lès-Croisilles, but was wounded when shot down by Reinhold Jörke later on the same day. Lowe returned to flying duty in early-1918, when posted to No. 24 Squadron, flying the S.E.5a single-seat fighter. Between 23 April and 1 July 1918, Lowe scored seven more victories, sharing one with Lieutenant Ronald T. Mark, destroying three and driving down four more out of control, to bring his total to nine.

Lowe was subsequently awarded the Distinguished Flying Cross, which was gazetted on 3 August 1918. His citation read:

Capt. Cyril Nelson Lowe, M.C. This officer has destroyed five enemy machines and driven down two others out of control. On one occasion he attacked two enemy triplanes, although at the time only one of his guns was serviceable; he shot down one of the machines in flames. On another occasion, while leading a formation of eight scouts he engaged a hostile formation of twenty-six machines. Having shot down a Fokker biplane he went to the assistance of one of our scouts and drove the enemy machine down to 500 feet; at this low altitude half of a blade of his propeller was shot off by fire from the ground.

This was followed by the award of the Military Cross, gazetted on 16 September 1918. The citation read:

T./Capt. Cyril Nelson Lowe, Gen. List, attd. R.A.F. For conspicuous gallantry and devotion to duty. This officer and another pilot were escorting a formation of machines engaged on a bombing raid when seven enemy scouts attacked the bombers. They both attacked these scouts, but at the outset this officer's machine was set on fire, and the other pilot's right hand top plane broke. During the fight that ensued each came to the rescue of the other. The other pilot first caused Capt. Lowe's pursuer to break off his attack, and then Capt. Lowe shot down the scout attacking his comrade. The action of both these officers, in practically unmanceuvrable machines, in coming to the rescue of each other in turn, showed courage and self-sacrifice of a very high order.

Lowe left the RAF after the war, being transferred to unemployed list on 2 March 1919.

=== Post-war career ===
Lowe returned to serve in the Royal Air Force on a three-year short service commission with the rank of flight lieutenant on 12 January 1921, but this was later cancelled and he was granted a permanent commission on 17 April 1923, backdated to January 1921. He was promoted to squadron leader on 1 July 1925, and was posted to the Headquarters of the Special Reserve and Auxiliary Air Force on 7 September 1925. However, on 14 September 1925 he was appointed temporary commander of No. 602 City of Glasgow (Bombing) Squadron of the Auxiliary Air Force. On 1 April 1926, he was appointed commander of No. 1 Squadron, based in Iraq, and on 1 November 1926 was transferred to No. 6 Armoured Car Company.

Lowe eventually returned to England, and was commander of No. 43 Squadron, based at RAF Tangmere by June 1928, the squadron becoming highly regarded for their aerobatic displays. He was posted to No. 2 Flying Training School, based at RAF Digby, on 18 November 1930. Lowe was promoted to wing commander on 1 January 1933, and in August was appointed chief instructor of the Oxford University Air Squadron, succeeding Keith Park, and being the first Cambridge man to command the Oxford Squadron. On 31 December 1937 Lowe was promoted to group captain, and retired from the Royal Air Force on 7 October 1944.

Lowe died in 1983, aged 91.

== See also ==
- List of top English points scorers and try scorers
