= DH5 (disambiguation) =

DH5 may refer to:

- Airco DH.5 a British First World War fighter aircraft
- DH5 alpha, a strain of E. coli
- A Good Day to Die Hard, the fifth film in the Die Hard film series
