= Amigny-Rouy =

- Commune
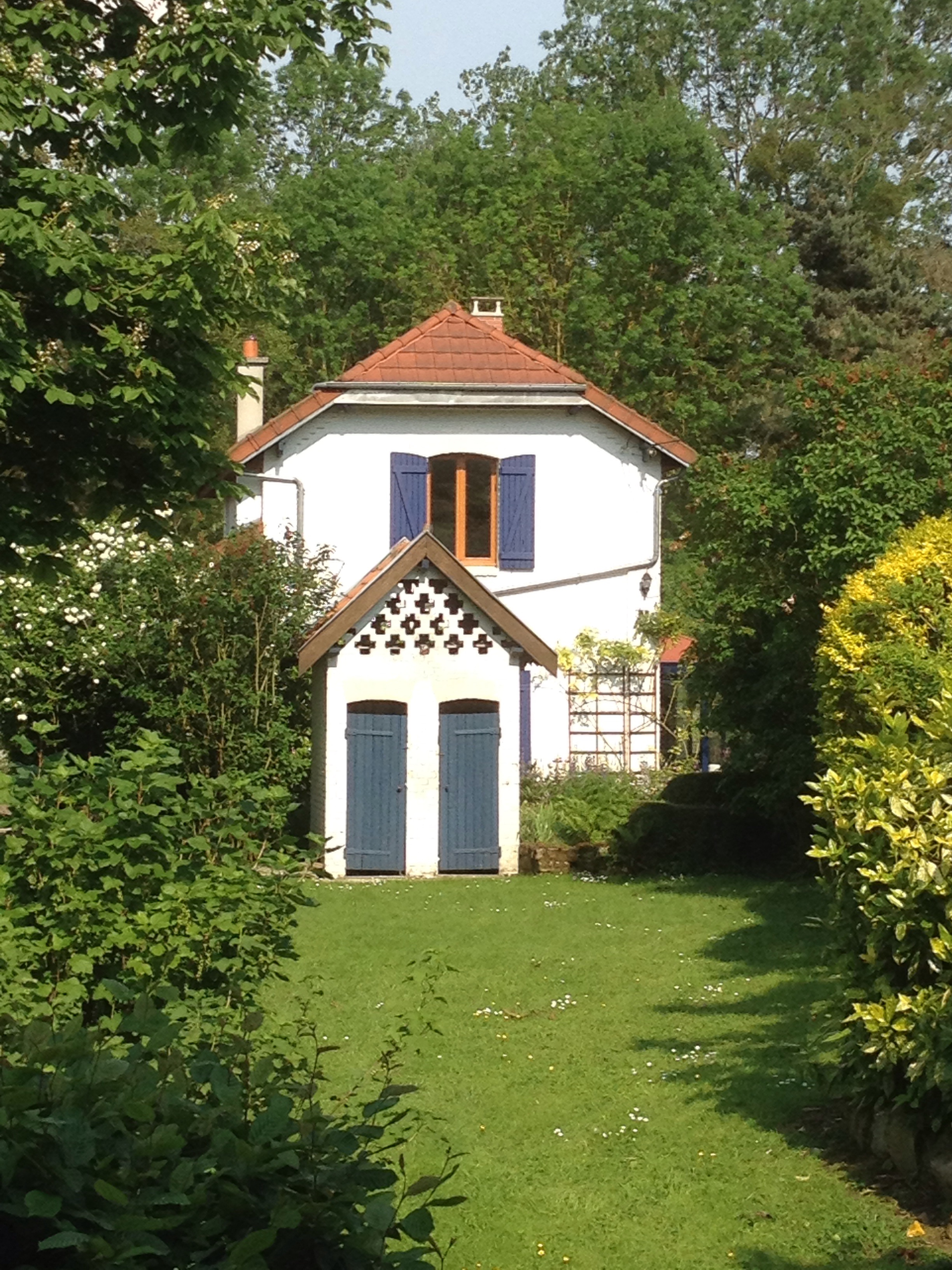
- Old railway station

- Coat of arms
- Location of Amigny-Rouy
- Location within France Location within Hauts-de-France
- Coordinates: 49°36′38″N 3°18′19″E
- Country: France
- Region: Hauts-de-France
- Department: Aisne
- Arrondissement: Laon
- Canton: Chauny
- Intercommunality: CA Chauny Tergnier La Fère

Government
  - Mayor (2026–32): Joël Duhénoy
- Area^{1}: 13.08 km^{2} (5.05 sq mi)
- Highest elevation: 147 m (482 ft)
- Lowest elevation: 44 m (144 ft)
- Population (2023): 707
  - Density: 54.1/km^{2} (140/sq mi)
- Time zone: UTC+01:00 (CET)
  - Summer (DST): UTC+02:00 (CEST)
- INSEE/Postal code: 02014 /02700
- ^{1} French Land Register data, which excludes lakes, ponds, glaciers > 1 km^{2} (0.386 sq mi or 247 acres) and river estuaries.

Amigny-Rouy (French pronunciation: [amiɲi ʁwi]) is a commune in the department of Aisne in the Hauts-de-France region of northern France.

== Geography ==
Amigny-Rouy is located some 30 km south of Saint Quentin and 25 km west by northwest of Laon. The commune is accessed by road D7 from Sinceny in the west passing through the heart of the commune and continuing east to Saint-Gobain. The D53 road comes from Condren in the northwest passing through the village and continuing south to Barisis. There is also a network of country roads throughout the commune. Most of the commune is farmland; however, there is a large, forested area in the south forming part of an extensive forested area outside the commune. There are no other hamlets or villages in the commune.

The Oise River forms the northern and northwestern border of the commune and the Ruisseau de Servais with numerous tributaries passes from east to west through the northern portion of the commune into the Oise. The Ru de Greve flows through the south of the commune. There are also a number of small lakes in the commune.

=== Heraldry ===
Arms of Amigny-Rouy	Blazon: Or, a bend sinister chequy a plomb argent and azure of 6 tires, at 1 three boar's heads sable tusked argent erased in gules; at 2 a cross fleury the same.

== Administration ==
List of Successive Mayors of Amigny-Rouy

Mayors from the French Revolution to 1935

From	To	Name
1792	1794	Jean Louis Langlet
1794	1812	Jean Lefevre
1813	1815	Bertin
1815	1816	Debrie
1816	1825	Antoine Lemaire
1825	1831	Louis Augustin Carlier
1831	1848	Jean Louis Demilly
1848	1849	Louis Delaporte
1849	1849	Xavier Joncourt
1849	1852	Germain Duhenoy
1852	1870	Louis Hector Lefevre
1870	1878	Jean Louis Lamotte
1878	1879	Evariste Guerin
1879	1880	Lucien Guille
1880	1888	Henri Delaporte
1888	1892	Auguste Maruy
1892	1905	Joseph Debrie-Demilly
1905	1908	Gustave Dufresne
1908	1913	Jean Baptiste Daulle
1913	1920	Lucien Langlet
1920	1924	Amédée Hain
1924	1929	Théophile Delaporte
1929	1935	Gaston Debrie

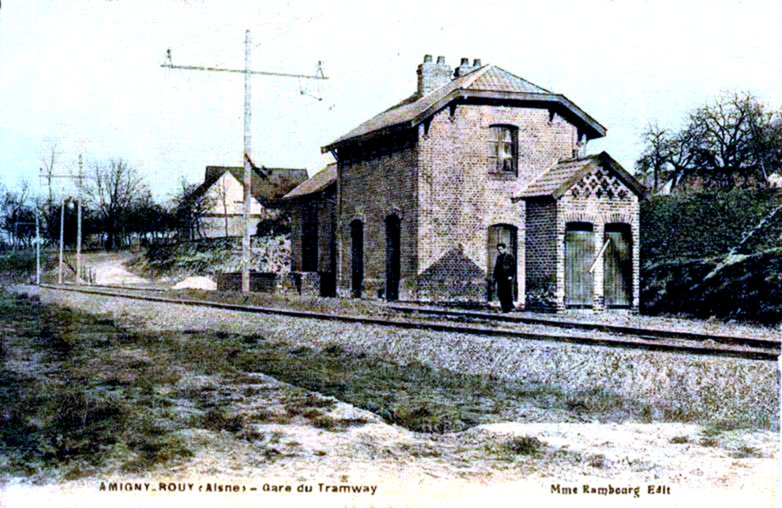
The old railway station in 1909

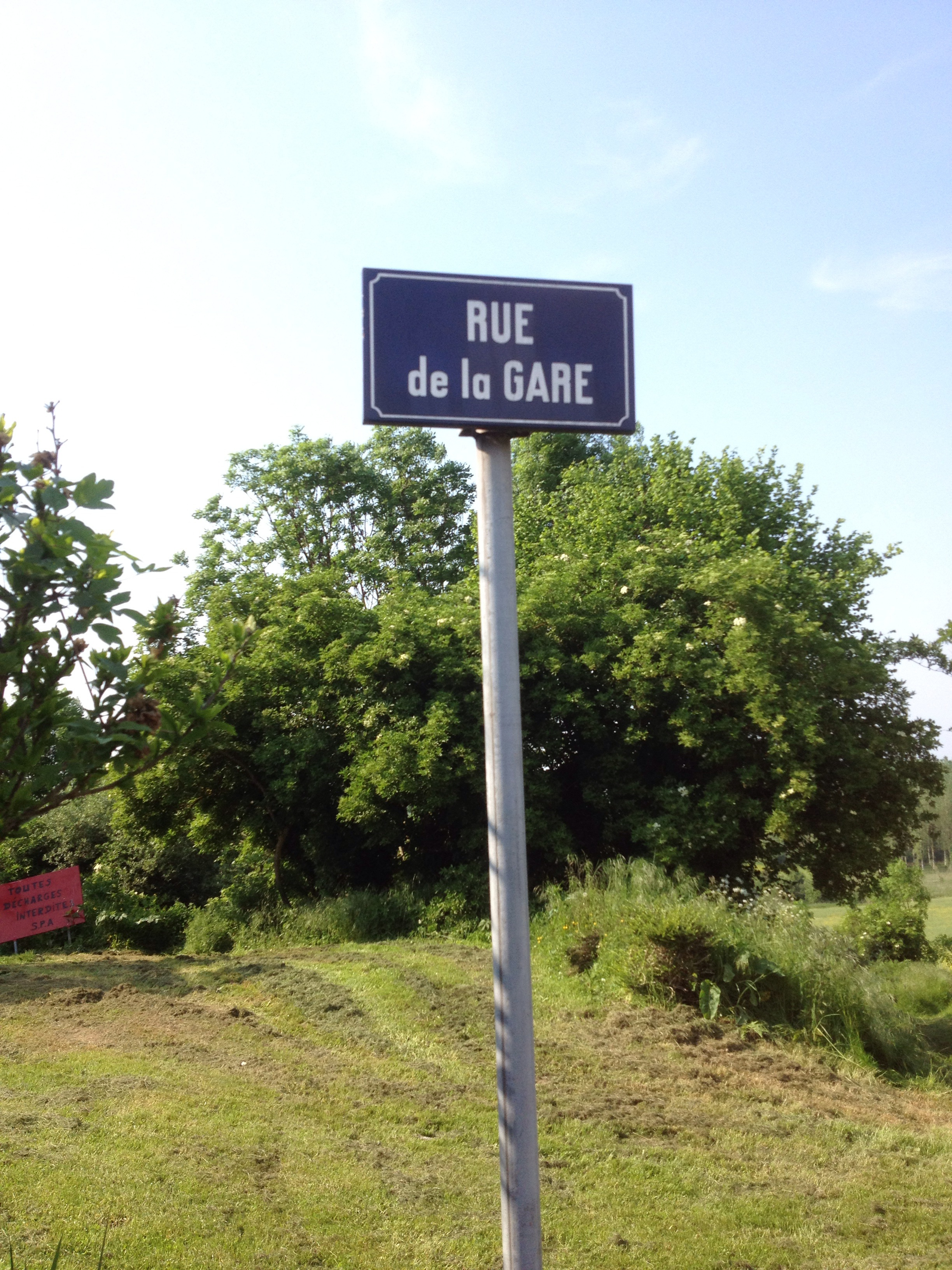
The old Rue de la Gare

Mayors from 1935

From	To	Name	Party
1935	1944	Eugène Coffin	
1944	1945	Lucien Lefevre	
1945	1947	Philémon Rousset	
1947	1949	Henry Triou	
1949	1950	Paul Demilly	
1950	1971	René Carpentier	
1971	1977	Odette Gomont	
1977	1983	Marceau Lecoeur	
1983	1989	Hubert de Wilde	
1989	2001	Michel Valeggi	
2001	2019 (deceased in office)	André Didier	DVD
2019	2020	Suzelle Delpouve	
2020	incumbent	Joël Duhénoy	

== Population ==
Historical population
Year	Pop.	±% p.a.
1968	546	—
1975	515	−0.83%
1982	622	+2.73%
1990	693	+1.36%
1999	626	−1.12%
2007	720	+1.76%
2012	749	+0.79%
2017	744	−0.13%
2023	707	−0.85%
Source: INSEE

== Religious heritage ==
The Parish Church contains a Stained glass window: Christ on the Cross (16th century)which is registered as an historical object.

== Notable people linked to the commune ==
- Gédéon Poizot, Lieutenant French Forces of the Interior (FFI), (born 26 June 1907 Amigny-Rouy - died 10 August 1944, at the edge of the Busigny woods), alias "Poulain-Germain," hero and martyr of the Resistance (Maquis Mazinghem), killed on 10 August 1944 by the Vichy Milice.
- Elysee Darthenay Alban, born 3 January 1913 in Montrouge, a graduate of the Lyautey Class from Saint-Cyr and became a lieutenant in the 4th RIM of Auxerre. He was under instruction with his battalion at Amigny-Rouy from 23 October 1939 to 10 May 1940. He married in Nuits-Saint-Georges on 3 January 1940 and his wife joined him in hiding from the military authorities in Amigny-Rouy. He was cited on the order of the Division and received the Croix de Guerre for his bravery in combat defending the Haubourdin (Lille) bridges from 28 to 31 May 1940. As a prisoner at Hoyeverda he failed twice to escape and was transferred to the disciplinary prison of Colditz from where he escaped on 6 July 1943. In December 1943 he made himself available to the Resistance in Lyon and was assigned to the FFI of Bourg-en-Bresse in January 1944. In early February 1944 he was head of the Maquis in the Secret Army of Jura. Arrested on 7 April 1944 by the Gestapo, he was tortured until 11 April but did not speak. His silence saved 800 Maquis including Colonel Romans-Petit, leader of the Secret Army of Ain and Savoie. He left two orphans. On 26 April 1945 General de Gaulle made him a chevalier of the Legion of Honour. In 1974 a class in Saint-Cyr was named after him, a hero the Resistance 1939–1945, who had only five months of family life which he spent illegally in Amigny-Rouy.

== Sports Associations ==
- Football club

== See also ==
- Communes of the Aisne department
