= List of aerial victories of Kurt Wüsthoff =

Kurt Wüsthoff (1897–1926) was a German First World War fighter ace credited with 27 confirmed aerial victories. Flying combat with Jagdstaffel 4 of the Imperial German Air Service, he shot down 24 enemy airplanes and three observation balloons between June 1917 and 10 March 1918. A 28th victory is uncounted for unknown reasons.

== The victory list ==
The victories of Kurt Wüsthoff are reported in chronological order, which is not necessarily the order or dates the victories were confirmed by headquarters.

No.	Date	Time	Foe	Unit	Location	Remarks
1	15 June 1917	2130 hours	Sopwith 1 1/2 Strutter	No. 45 Squadron RFC	Voormezele	
2	22 June 1917	1450 hours	Observation balloon	2nd Section, 5th Company, 2nd Balloon Wing	Wijtschate (Wytschaete), Belgium	British artillery direction post
3	11 July 1917	1510 hours	Observation balloon	26th Section, 5th Company, 2nd Balloon Wing	West of Messines Ridge, near Wijtschate and also known by the German name Wytschaete-Bogen	British artillery direction post
4	16 July 1917	1815 hours	Observation balloon	38th Section, 7th Company, 2nd Balloon Wing	Kemmel, Belgium	British artillery direction post
5	20 July 1917	2120 hours	Sopwith Camel		Between Beselare (Becelaere), Belgium and Gheluvelt, Belgium	
Unconfirmed	27 July 1917	2040 hours	Sopwith		Dadizele (Dadizeele)	Awarded to a pilot from Jagdstaffel 26
6	31 July 1917	1445 hours	Royal Aircraft Factory FE.2d	No. 20 Squadron RFC	Verbrandenmolen	
7	5 August 1917	1500 hours	Nieuport 23	No. 29 Squadron RFC	West of Ypres, Belgium	
8	3 September 1917	0830 hours	Sopwith Pup	No. 46 Squadron RFC	Ten Brielen	
9	3 September 1917	1700 hours	Royal Aircraft Factory RE.8	No. 4 Squadron RFC	East of Zillebeke, Belgium	
10	4 September 1917	0805 hours	Nieuport 23	No. 29 Squadron RFC	Northwest of Polygon Wood, Belgium	
11	4 September 1917	1045 hours	Sopwith Camel		South of Ypres, Belgium	
12	5 September 1917	1000 hours	Sopwith Camel	No. 45 Squadron RFC	Southeast of Zillebeke, Belgium	
13	11 September 1917	1020 hours	Sopwith Camel	No. 70 Squadron RFC	Saint-Julien	
14	12 September 1917	2000 hours	Sopwith Camel		Deulemont, France	No corresponding loss reported by the British
15	13 September 1917	2030 hours	Sopwith Triplane	No. 1 Naval Squadron RNAS	South of Wervik, Belgium	
16	16 September 1917	1245 hours	Sopwith Camel	No. 70 Squadron RFC	West of Staden, Belgium	
17	20 September 1917	1215 hours	SPAD	No. 23 Squadron RFC	Amerika	
18	20 September 1917	1430 hours	SPAD		West of Langemark (Langemarck), Belgium	
19	22 September 1917	1410 hours	Sopwith Camel		Langemark, Belgium	
20	24 September 1917	1650 hours	Sopwith Camel	No. 10 Squadron RNAS	Moorslede, Belgium	
21	26 September 1917	1040 hours	SPAD	No. 19 Squadron RFC	Beselare	
22	27 October 1917	1440 hours	Sopwith Triplane	No. 1 Squadron RNAS	Between Poelcapelle and Hooge, Belgium	No corresponding loss reported by the British
23	31 October 1917	1230 hours	Royal Aircraft Factory SE.5a		North of Bellewaarde Vijver near Ypres	
24	5 November 1917	1245 hours	Sopwith Camel		Poelkappelle (Poelcapelle)	
25	5 November 1917	1300 hours	Sopwith Camel	No. 45 Squadron RFC	South of Staden	
26	9 November 1917	1030 hours	Royal Aircraft Factory RE.8	No. 45 Squadron RFC	North of Bellewaarde Vijver	
27	10 March 1918	1640 hours	Sopwith Camel		Between La Bassée, France and Bethune, France	
28	12 March 1918	Mid-day	Royal Aircraft Factory SE.5a		Between La Bassée, France and Bethune, France	No corresponding loss reported by British

Abbreviations were expanded by the editor creating this list.
