= Barisis-aux-Bois =

- Commune
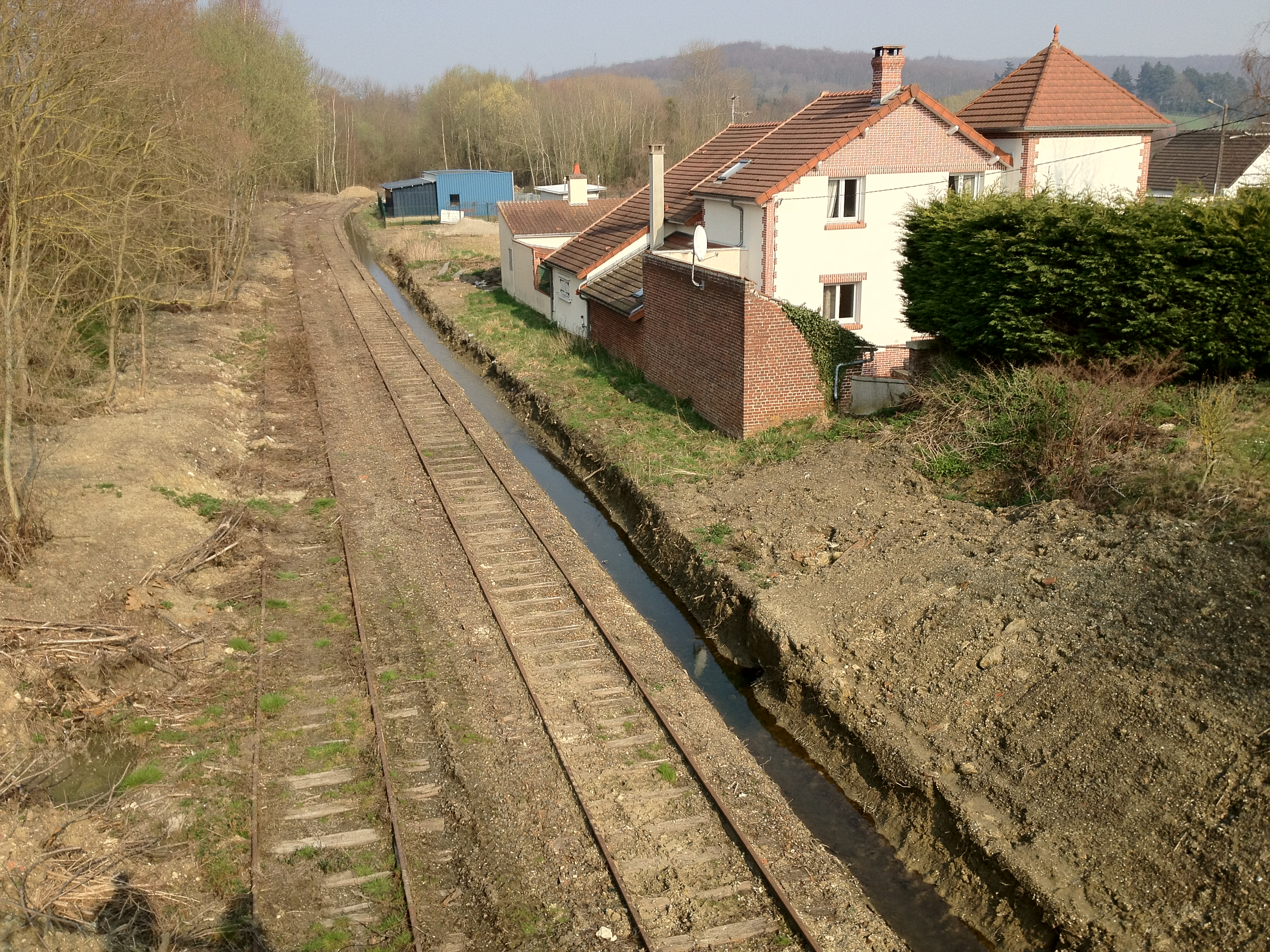
- Old railway station

- Coat of arms
- Location of Barisis-aux-Bois
- Location within France Location within Hauts-de-France
- Coordinates: 49°34′43″N 3°19′41″E
- Country: France
- Region: Hauts-de-France
- Department: Aisne
- Arrondissement: Laon
- Canton: Vic-sur-Aisne
- Intercommunality: Picardie des Châteaux

Government
  - Mayor (2026–32): Emmanuel Fontaine
- Area^{1}: 15.11 km^{2} (5.83 sq mi)
- Elevation: 50 m (160 ft)
- Highest elevation: 186 m (610 ft)
- Lowest elevation: 53 m (174 ft)
- Population (2023): 752
  - Density: 49.8/km^{2} (129/sq mi)
- Time zone: UTC+01:00 (CET)
  - Summer (DST): UTC+02:00 (CEST)
- INSEE/Postal code: 02049 /02700
- ^{1} French Land Register data, which excludes lakes, ponds, glaciers > 1 km^{2} (0.386 sq mi or 247 acres) and river estuaries.

Barisis-aux-Bois, formerly called Barisis until 3 December 2014, is a commune in the department of Aisne in the Hauts-de-France region of northern France.

== Geography ==
Barisis-aux-Bois is located some 20 km west of Laon and 25 km north of Soissons. The village is in the heart of the national forest of Saint-Gobain. The commune can be accessed by the D1750 road from Pierremande in the west to the village with the D534 continuing east to Saint-Gobain and the D535 going southeast to Septvaux. There is also the D53 road from Amigny-Rouy in the north passing through the village and continuing south to Verneuil-sous-Coucy. The D7 road from Amigny-Rouy to Saint-Gobain passes through the northern corner of the commune. Other than the village there are three hamlets in the commune: Bernagousse, L'Abbaye, and Le Crotoir. The commune is heavily forested, especially in the north - with some areas of farmland.

The Menil stream passes through the commune from south to north joining the Ruisseau de Servais and continuing north forming part of the eastern border of the commune joining with many other streams before joining the Oise.

== History ==
Barisis-aux-Bois appears as Barisy on the 1750 Cassini Map and the same on the 1790 version.

The spelling of Barisis was registered in the Bulletin des lois of 1801 although in 1793 the spelling had been Barizis.

Barisis-aux-Bois has an old railway station on the former Chauny to Saint-Gobain line.

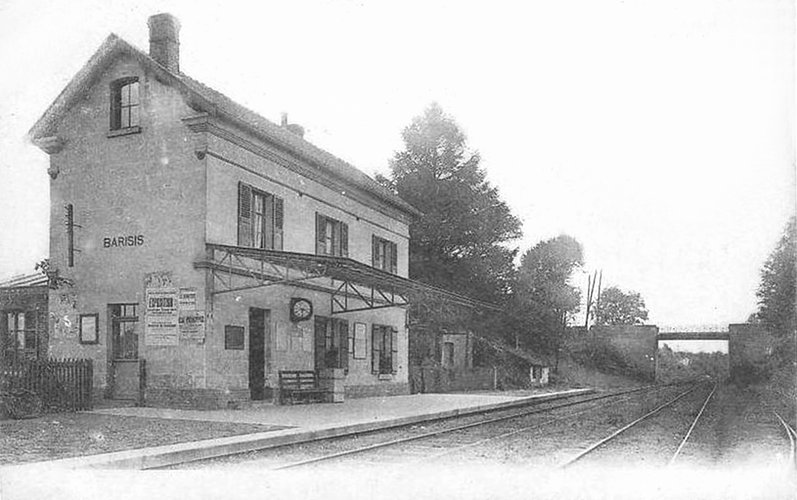
Barisis Station in 1900.

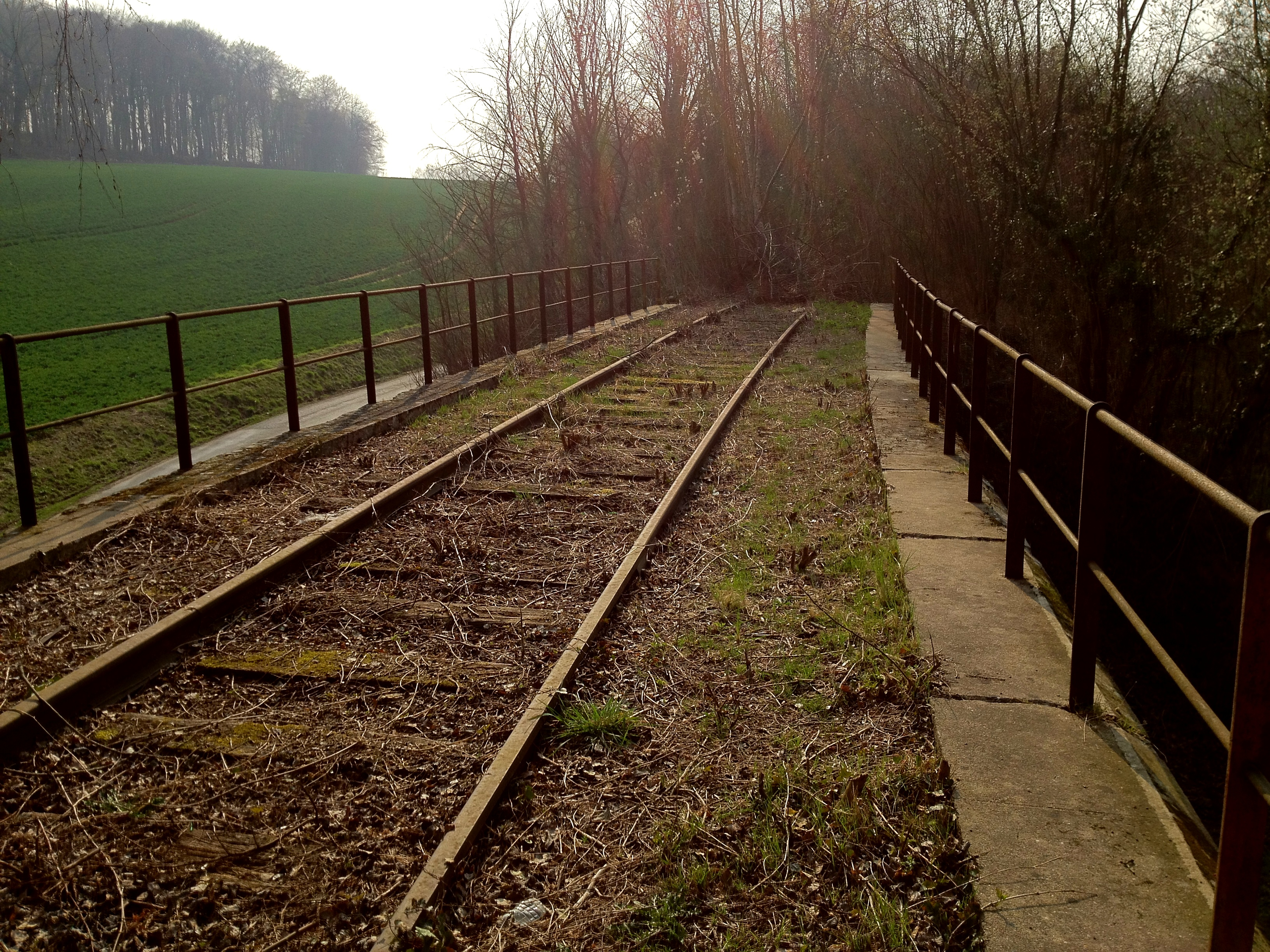
Old railway bridge

=== Heraldry ===
Arms of Barisis	Blazon: Party per bend sinister, one azure, with a tree proper in pale leaved in vert truncated by bend; two vert, a herbed terrace over a river all in bend sinister; over all a bend sinister argent charged with four pigs proper spotted in sable contourned.

== Population ==
Historical population
Year	Pop.	±% p.a.
1968	723	—
1975	694	−0.58%
1982	697	+0.06%
1990	689	−0.14%
1999	669	−0.33%
2007	703	+0.62%
2012	734	+0.87%
2017	740	+0.16%
2023	752	+0.27%
Source: INSEE

== Notable people linked to the commune ==
- Louis Nicolas Lemasle, painter, retired in Barisis and died there on 14 October 1876.

== See also ==
- Communes of the Aisne department
