= Horace Barton =

Horace Dale Barton
- Born: November 22, 1891; Kokstad, KwaZulu-Natal, South Africa
- Died: 25 May 1975 (aged 83)
- Military career
- Allegiance: South Africa
- Branch: Royal Flying Corps
- Rank: Captain
- Units: No. 84 Squadron RFC, No. 24 Squadron RAF
- Awards: Distinguished Flying Cross with Bar

Captain Horace Dale Barton (22 November 1891 – 25 May 1975) was a World War I flying ace credited with 19 aerial victories.

He originally spent 1914–1916 with the army in German Southwest and East Africa. He then joined the Royal Flying Corps in England. His first assignment after pilot's training was 84 Squadron. On 3 January 1918, he moved on to 24 Squadron. On 18 February, he scored his first victory, sending a DFW reconnaissance plane down out of control. On 16 May, he scored his fourth; it is likely he was the one who killed German ace Hans Wolff. His steady accumulation of single victories saw him become an ace on 6 June, when he defeated an Albatros D.V. His next victory, on 17 June 1918, was his most important, as he helped force down and capture 27-victory ace Kurt Wüsthoff in a new Fokker D.VII. Eventually, scoring single triumphs (except for 15 September, when he scored twice), he raised his count to 19. He single-handedly destroyed five enemies, including one set afire. He shared victories in three cases of destroyed enemy aircraft. He sent down seven foes out of control, though two of those were shared victories. He aided in the capture of two enemy planes. He shot down one balloon by himself, and had help on a second.

During World War II, Barton returned to service as an intelligence officer for the South African Air Force.

== Honors and awards ==
Distinguished Flying Cross

He has accounted for 14 enemy machines, destroying two, forcing two to land in our lines, and driving 10 down out of control. In addition, he has destroyed a kite balloon which was flying at a height of 500 ft.; engaging it at close range he drove it down in flames.

Bar to Distinguished Flying Cross

Lieut. (A./Capt.) Horace Dale Barton, D.F.C. (FRANCE)
