= Bernot, Aisne =

Bernot
- Commune
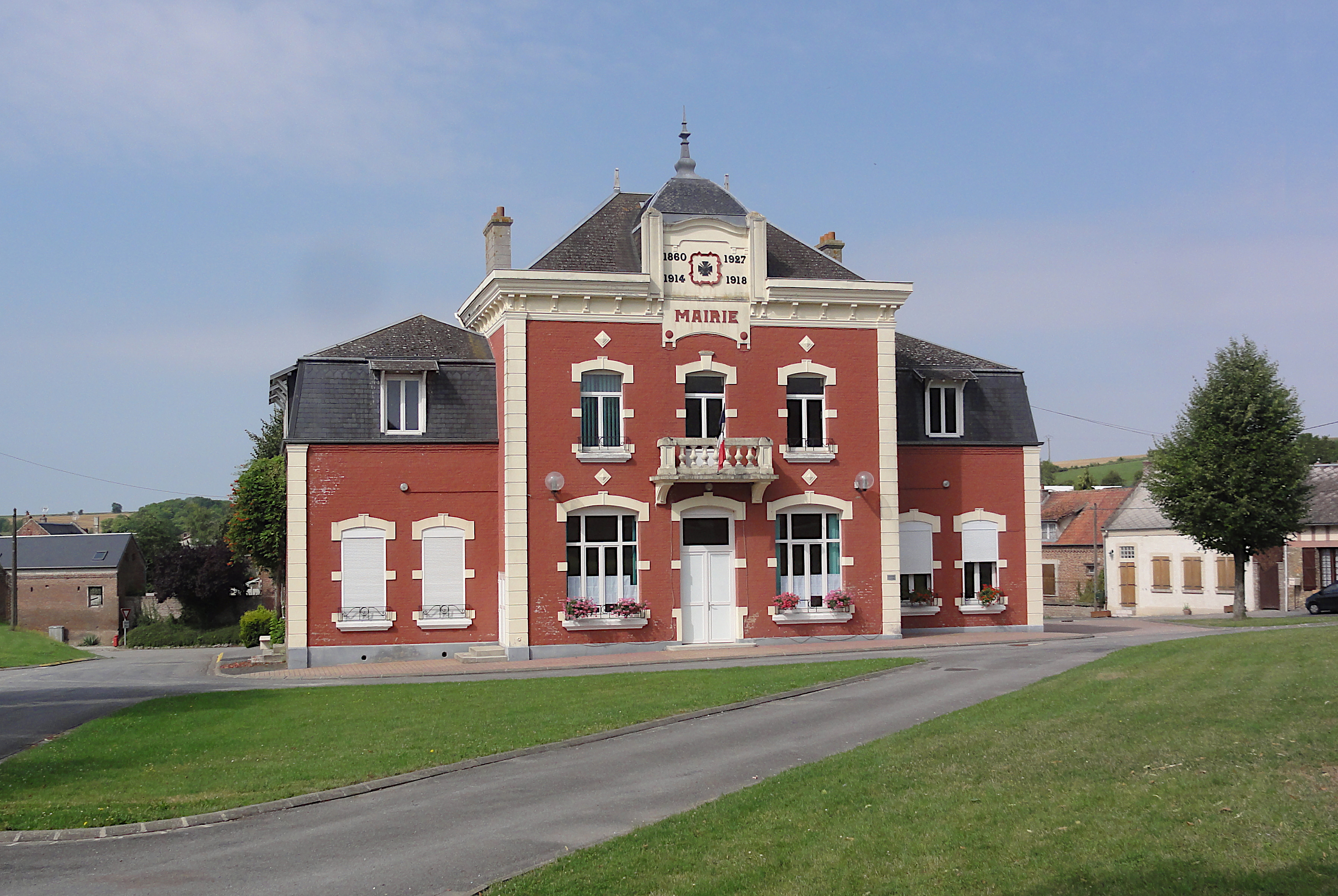
- Town hall
- Location of Bernot
- Location within France Location within Hauts-de-France
- Coordinates: 49°52′10″N 3°29′57″E
- Country: France
- Region: Hauts-de-France
- Department: Aisne
- Arrondissement: Vervins
- Canton: Guise
- Intercommunality: Thiérache Sambre et Oise

Government
  - Mayor (2026–32): Xavier Bocquillon
- Area^{1}: 16.56 km^{2} (6.39 sq mi)
- Elevation: 90 m (300 ft)
- Highest elevation: 144 m (472 ft)
- Lowest elevation: 72 m (236 ft)
- Population (2023): 431
  - Density: 26.0/km^{2} (67.4/sq mi)
- Time zone: UTC+01:00 (CET)
  - Summer (DST): UTC+02:00 (CEST)
- INSEE/Postal code: 02070 /02120
- ^{1} French Land Register data, which excludes lakes, ponds, glaciers > 1 km^{2} (0.386 sq mi or 247 acres) and river estuaries.

Bernot (French pronunciation: [bɛʁno]) is a commune in the department of Aisne in Hauts-de-France in northern France.

== Population ==
Historical population
Year	Pop.	±% p.a.
1968	608	—
1975	540	−1.68%
1982	511	−0.79%
1990	459	−1.33%
1999	455	−0.10%
2007	443	−0.33%
2012	446	+0.14%
2017	452	+0.27%
2023	431	−0.79%
Source: INSEE

== See also ==
- Communes of the Aisne department
