= Andrew Cowper =

Andrew King Cowper
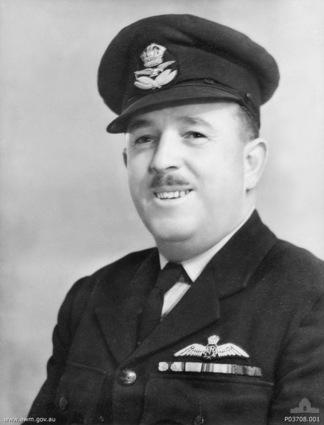
- Squadron Leader Andrew Cowper in the Second World War
- Born: 16 November 1898; Bingara, New South Wales
- Died: 25 June 1980 (aged 81); Randwick, New South Wales
- Military career
- Allegiance: United Kingdom; Australia
- Branch: Royal Flying Corps; Royal Air Force; Royal Australian Air Force
- Service years: 1916–1920; 1942–1945
- Rank: Squadron Leader
- Units: No. 24 Squadron RFC (1917–18); No. 79 Squadron RAF (1919)
- Conflicts: World War I; Western Front; World War II
- Awards: Military Cross & Two Bars

Andrew King Cowper, MC & Two Bars (16 November 1898 – 25 June 1980) was an Australian fighter pilot and flying ace of the First World War. Born in Bingara, New South Wales, he was educated in the United Kingdom at Eastbourne College. Joining the Royal Flying Corps in May 1917, he was posted to No. 24 Squadron RFC in France and was credited with shooting down nineteen German aircraft between November 1917 and March 1918. Cowper was awarded the Military Cross and two Bars during the war for his efforts in destroying German aircraft, in addition to carrying out ground-attacks. He was posted to the Home Establishment in April 1918, serving out the remainder of the war in the United Kingdom; he was discharged in 1920. Returning to Australia, he established his own horticultural business. He served in the Royal Australian Air Force in the Second World War, and died on 25 June 1980 aged eighty-one.

== Early life ==
Andrew Cowper was born in Bingara, New South Wales, on 16 November 1898, the fifth child of Henry Percival Cowper, a surveyor, and his Channel Islander wife Amy Fraser (née Farquhar). Cowper was a descendant of poet William Cowper and colonial administrator Philip Gidley King. He was educated in England at Eastbourne College in Sussex, graduating in 1916.

== First World War ==
On the completion of his secondary studies in 1916, Cowper enlisted in the Royal Sussex Regiment for service in the First World War. On 10 May 1917, he transferred to the Royal Flying Corps and was selected for flight training as a temporary second lieutenant. Gaining his wings, Cowper was posted to No. 24 Squadron RFC in France during August, piloting Airco DH.5s. The squadron operated over the Dunkirk and Amiens sectors, with Cowper working against German aerial and ground forces in the area.

Cowper claimed his first aerial victories in November 1917, shooting down two German Albatros D.IIIs. The following month, No. 24 Squadron was re-equipped with S.E.5as. Cowper achieved flying ace status on the new aircraft, being credited with his fifth victory on 19 February 1918. Seven days later, he led a formation of six aircraft out on a patrol. While airborne, the group intercepted a party of four German triplanes. Closing in for an attack, Cowper managed to destroy one of the machines, while the remaining three were shot down by the other men in his patrol. Heading back to base, Cowper spotted a Pfalz D.III scout and "shepherding it by the most skilful piloting west of the lines" forced the aircraft to land, undamaged, at a British aerodrome. Thus during the period of 18 February to 6 March, he had been credited with shooting down six hostile aircraft, bringing his tally to nine. For his "conspicuous gallantry and devotion to duty" coupled with displaying the "greatest courage and determination" in the destruction of these aircraft, Cowper was awarded the Military Cross. The announcement and accompanying citation for the decoration was announced in a supplement to the London Gazette on 22 April 1918.

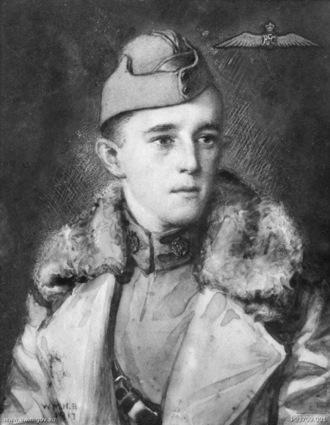
Hand coloured portrait of Second Lieutenant Andrew Cowper c.1917

Throughout the remainder of March 1918, Cowper was credited with shooting down a further ten German aircraft, either destroying the machines in aerial combat or forcing them down as out of control. These proved to be Cowper's final victories of the war, bringing his ultimate score to nineteen aircraft shot down and making him No. 24 Squadron's fourth highest scoring ace. Cited for his "gallantry and skill ... of the highest order" in bringing these aircraft down, Cowper was awarded a Bar to his Military Cross. On 24 March, he was made a flight commander within No. 24 Squadron and promoted to temporary captain.

In addition to working against German airborne elements, Cowper carried out twenty ground-attack sorties between 21 March and 1 April 1918. On one particular day during this period, he executed four separate attacks on entrenched German infantry and transport. In the first raid, Cowper bombed a unit of troops in their trench, causing "great havoc and confusion" despite being subject to heavy gunfire himself and consequently forced the men to abandon their trench. After returning to his aerodrome for further bombs and ammunition, he set off a second time and successfully assaulted troops and transport forces, before carrying out two further raids that day. Cowper was awarded a second Bar to his Military Cross for his "magnificent dash and determination" in his attacks on land forces. The awards of both Bars were promogulated in a supplement to the London Gazette on 22 June 1918, along with the full citations for the decorations.

In April 1918, Cowper returned to the United Kingdom for duties with the Home Establishment. Transferring to the newly established Royal Air Force later that month, he spent the remainder or the war in England. The following year, he was posted to No. 79 Squadron RAF and served with the unit as part of the British occupation of Germany. He was later posted to India, before retiring from the Royal Air Force on 13 February 1920.

== Post-military career and later life ==
Cowper returned to Australia on his retirement from the Royal Air Force, working on his parents' sheep farming property near Coonamble, New South Wales. At the district registrar's office, Randwick, Cowper wed Miriam Goldberg on 28 April 1924; the couple later had sons Leon and Henry. Moving to Sydney, Cowper became proprietor of a seed and plant merchant company, Henderson & Co., while Miriam established a florist store. As their business ventures expanded, the couple purchased a gladioli-farm at Mona Vale. On the outbreak of the Second World War, Cowper enlisted in the Royal Australian Air Force on 23 February 1942. He served as an officer in the Administrative and Special Duties Branch, rising to the rank of squadron leader. He was discharged from service on 2 March 1945, his final posting being to RAAF Base Rathmines; his son Leon had also served as a warrant officer in the Royal Australian Air Force during the war.

An accomplished and passionate horticulturalist, Cowper cultured a "fine garden" at his home in Bellevue Hill. A member of the Australian Jockey Club and Sydney Turf Club, Cowper died at the Prince of Wales Hospital, Randwick, on 25 June 1980. Predeceased by his wife and children by some years, he was cremated.
