= Airco DH.5 =

British First World War fighter aircraft

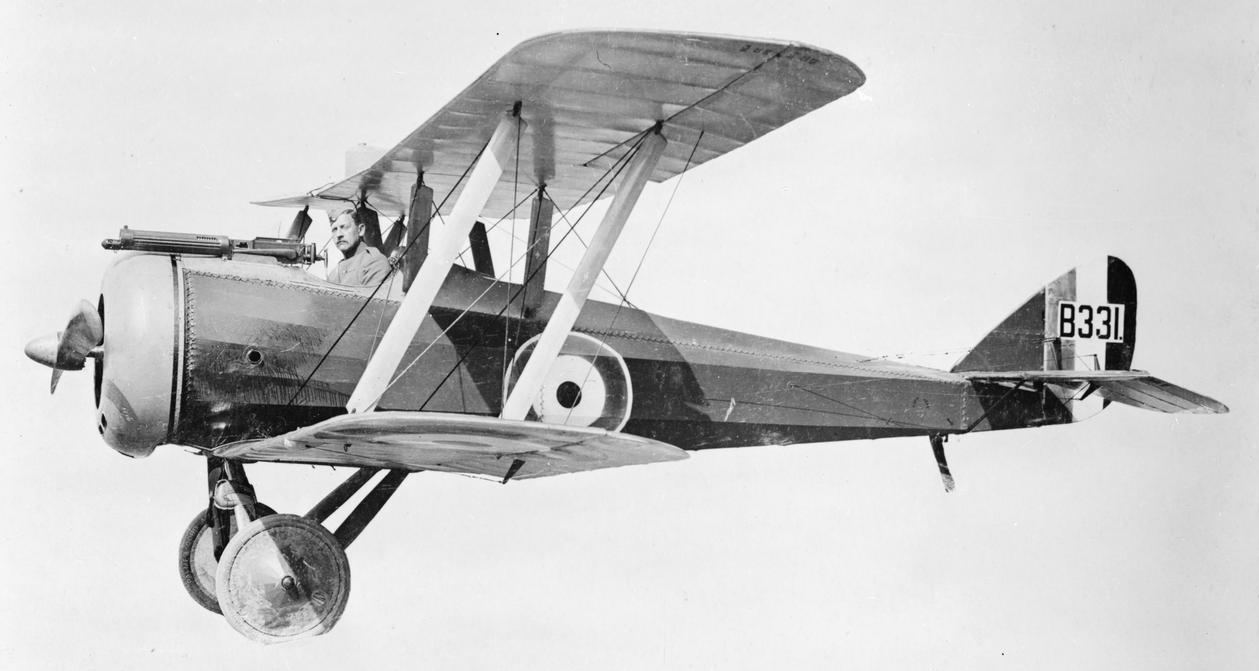

General information
- Type: fighter
- Manufacturer: Aircraft Manufacturing Company (Airco)
- Designer: Geoffrey de Havilland
- Primary user: Royal Flying Corps (RFC)
- Number built: 550

History
- Introduction date: May 1917
- First flight: August 1916

The Airco DH.5 was a British First World War single-seat biplane fighter aircraft. It was designed and manufactured at British aviation company Airco. Development was led by aircraft designer Geoffrey de Havilland as a replacement for the obsolete Airco DH.2.

The DH.5 was one of the first British fighters designed with the improved Constantinesco gun synchronizer, which allowed a forward-firing machine gun to fire through the propeller faster and more reliably than the older mechanical systems. It was also one of the earliest biplanes with a marked "back-stagger" of its wings. By the time the DH.5 was fielded, it was already inferior to other fighters in service and thus both unpopular and unsatisfactory with the pilots of the Royal Flying Corps (RFC). The type was quickly withdrawn from service once supplies of the Royal Aircraft Factory S.E.5 permitted.

== Design and development ==
=== Origins ===
Shortly after completing work upon the twin-seat Airco DH.4 light bomber, Captain Geoffrey de Havilland commenced work on a new single-seat fighter aircraft to replace the obsolete Airco DH.2 fighter, which was designated at the DH.5. The design sought to combine the superior performance of a tractor biplane with the excellent forward visibility of a pusher type. The resultant aircraft was a relatively compact single-bay biplane, and while the construction was that of a conventional tractor biplane, the mainplanes were given 27 in (690 mm) of backward stagger, so that the lower wing was forward of the upper wing. This configuration enabled the pilot to be positioned underneath the leading edge of the wing, providing uninterrupted forward and upward views, a configuration that has been described as radical, for the era.

The first prototype underwent manufacturer's trials at Hendon Aerodrome in late 1916. It was powered by a single 110 hp (82 kW) Le Rhône 9Ja rotary engine, which drove a two-blade propeller. The fuselage had flat sides aft of the wings and featured short fairings either side of the circular engine cowling. Towards the rear of the airframe, the fuselage tapered to a vertical rudder post at the tail, which comprised a small fin and horn-balanced rudder arrangement. The equal-span single-bay wings were outfitted with large ailerons on both the upper and lower mainplanes, while a rubber bungee cord attached to the upper ailerons returned them to their standard position. At an early stage, the prototype was fitted with a small hemispherical spinner. As the pilot was seated forward of the centre of gravity, the main fuel tank was behind the cockpit, below the oil tank. An auxiliary gravity fuel tank was fitted over the top mainplane, offset to the right.

=== Into flight ===
Test flights determined that it lacked sufficient directional control, which led to an enlarged fin and rudder being adopted. Early on, the first prototype had been flown unarmed. Around the same time as the revised tail unit was installed, it was also armed in preparation for official trials. The prototype armament installation comprised a single forward-firing .303 in (7.7 mm) Vickers machine gun, which was either fixed to fire upward at an angle or possibly mounted so that its elevation could be adjusted in flight. In the production installation the gun was given a more conventional fixed mounting on top of the cowl, offset to the left, to fire in the line of flight. The DH.5 may have been designed with the intention of attacking enemy planes from below, but its limited operational ceiling in comparison to contemporaries would have made this infeasible.

On 9 December 1916, the DH.5 prototype commenced service trials at the Central Flying School. The official report from the observations of its pilots was largely favourable, stating that it possessed satisfactory stability and controllability, its favourable qualities for reconnaissance and agility, but also noted a poor view to the rear. The type's speed was a significant advance over its DH.2 predecessor, but existing fighters already exceeded its capabilities, especially in climb. Performance may have been reduced by an alternative four-bladed propeller fitted during testing.

=== Production ===
By the time trials commenced in France, significantly more capable types such as the Sopwith Camel and the Royal Aircraft Factory S.E.5 were not far behind. The performance of the new fighter was also inferior to the earlier Sopwith Pup. The provision of a single machine gun at a time when most fighters carried two also meant the aircraft was under-armed for 1917. Nevertheless, on 15 January 1917, the DH.5 was ordered into production with two initial contracts for a total of 400 aircraft. A total of four manufacturers were involved in producing the type: Airco (200), British Caudron (50), Darracq (200) and March, Jones & Cribb (100).

The DH.5 was subject to extensive changes prior to entering mass production. A substitute fuel system was adopted, which included an additional five-gallon gravity tank mounted above the upper wing and a pressurised main tank directly behind the pilot's seat. The appearance of the aircraft was drastically changed via a revised fuselage, which now had an octagonal cross section and featured additional stringers around the area of the engine cowling. The horn balance was removed from the rudder. Some of these changes made the aircraft more complex to manufacture.

The main fuselage was produced in two sections that were butt-joined at an attachment point aligned with the rear wing struts. Extensive use was made of plywood throughput the structure, while the remainder used conventional wire-braced wooden box-girders. While some DH.5s were built with the original rubber bungee return springs on the ailerons, later-built examples used pulleys and balance cables. A positive feature of the aircraft was its great structural strength, which was revealed during April 1917 in destructive testing.

== Operational history ==
The introduction of the DH.5 to squadron service with the Royal Flying Corps (RFC) was protracted. These delays were the result of Airco's focus on the more successful DH.4, greatly hindered the type's prospects. The first DH.5 only arrived with No. 24 Squadron on 1 May 1917, and deliveries were slow, so that the squadron only had a few by 7 June. The DH.5 was not well regarded by the squadron, a common feeling with other users.

Soon after entering service, the DH.5 quickly proved to be most unpopular with the RFC. Its unconventional appearance led to largely unfounded rumours of handling difficulties. There were also claims that the DH.5 had gone into service against the wishes of its designers. What was true was that while it was manoeuvrable, performance rapidly dropped off over 10,000 ft (3,000 m), and it lost altitude quickly in combat. The position of the upper wing resulted in an unfortunate blind spot above and to the rear which was the very direction from which a single-seater would generally be attacked.

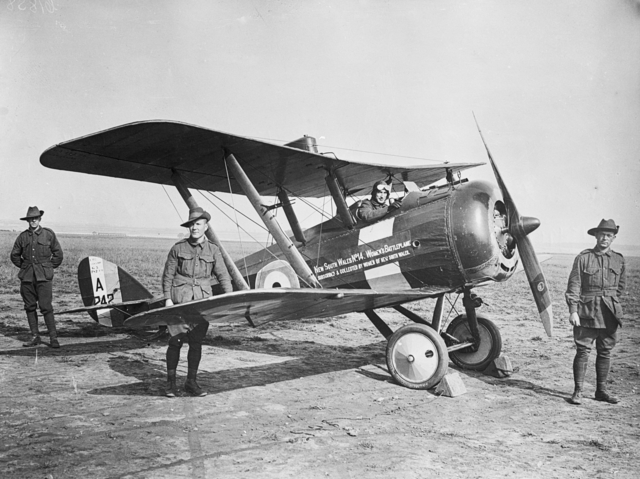
DH.5 with the Australian Flying Corps in September 1917

The robust construction, good performance at low altitude and the pilot's good forward field of view made the aircraft a useful ground-attack aircraft. In this capacity, the type served with distinction in the Battle of Cambrai. During the battle, the DH.5 had, in conjunction with Sopwith Camels, provided airborne mobile machine gun coverage to the infantry, strafing German trenches and causing heavy losses to the Germans. Replacement had already begun and Cambrai had little impact on its withdrawal.

The DH.5 formed the initial equipment of No. 2 Squadron Australian Flying Corps, the first Australian fighter squadron. It was unsatisfactory and enemy twin-seater airplanes were often able to escape. It served mainly as a ground-attack aircraft until December 1917, when the type was replaced by the S.E.5a. By this time, the withdrawal of the type from the Western Front was almost complete, the last DH.5 squadron receiving the S.E.5a in January 1918. DH.5s issued to training units proved unpopular and the type soon vanished from RFC service. A number of retired aircraft were reused as trials machines, some of these tests included alternative gun mountings, jettisonable fuel tanks and plywood coverings.

No original aircraft has survived but an airworthy full-scale reproduction, built in the United States by John Shiveley, is on display in the Aviation Heritage Centre, Omaka Aerodrome, New Zealand.

== Military operators ==
Australia

- Australian Flying Corps
  - No. 2 Squadron AFC (a.k.a. No. 68 Squadron RFC) in France
  - No. 6 (Training) Squadron AFC
  - No. 7 (Training) Squadron AFC in the United Kingdom.

United Kingdom

- Royal Flying Corps
  - No. 24 Squadron RFC
  - No. 32 Squadron RFC
  - No. 41 Squadron RFC
  - No. 64 Squadron RFC
  - No. 68 Squadron RFC

== Specifications ==
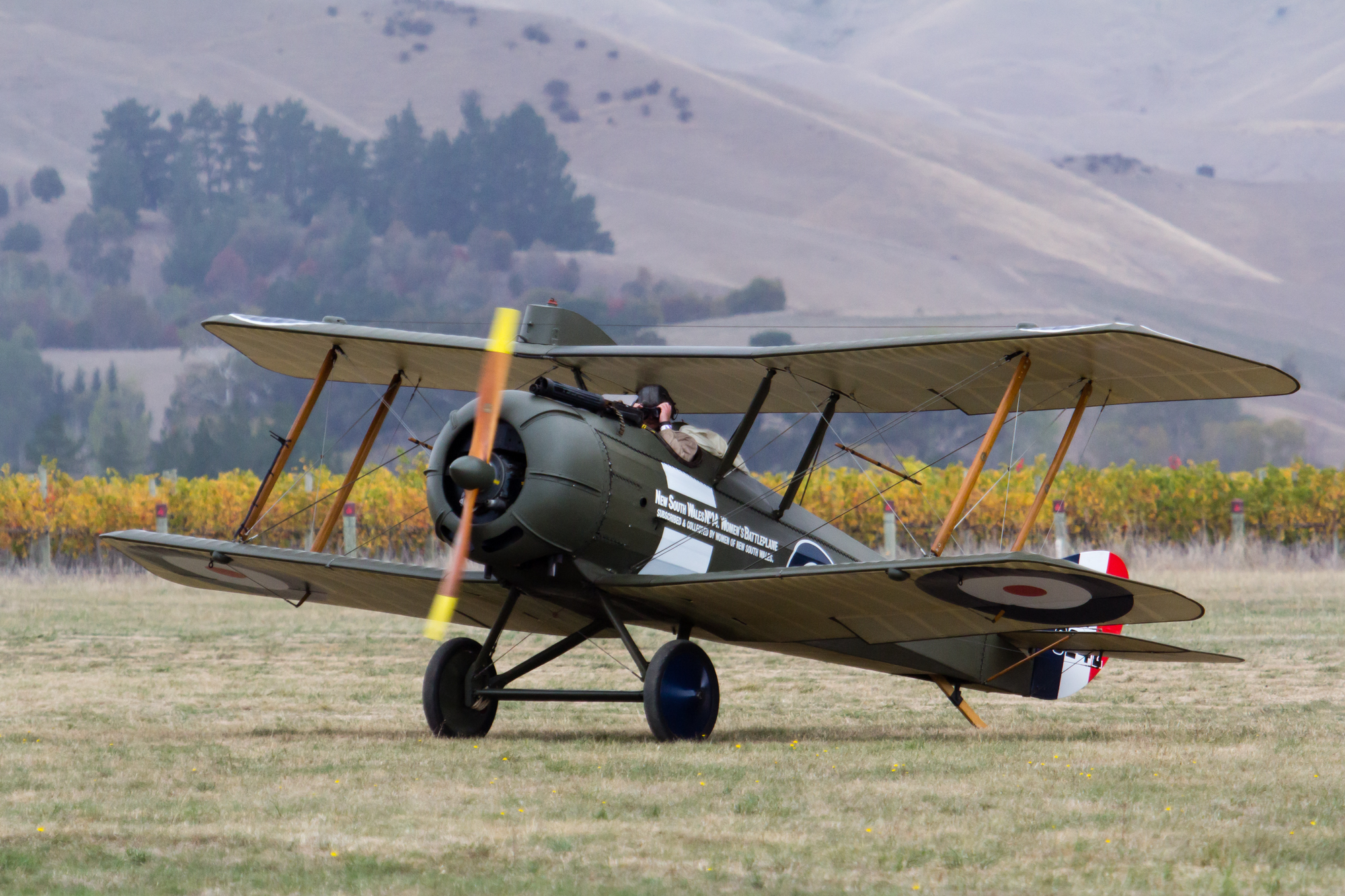
Replica DH.5 ZK-JOQ at the Classic Fighters 2015 airshow in Blenheim, New Zealand

Data from British Aeroplanes 1914–18

General characteristics

- Crew: One
- Length: 22 ft 0 in (6.71 m)
- Wingspan: 25 ft 8 in (7.82 m)
- Height: 9 ft 1 1/2 in (2.781 m)
- Wing area: 212.1 sq ft (19.70 m^{2})
- Empty weight: 1,010 lb (458 kg)
- Gross weight: 1,492 lb (677 kg)
- Fuel capacity: 26 imp gal (31 US gal; 120 L)
- Powerplant: 1 × Le Rhône 9J nine-cylinder rotary engine, 110 hp (82 kW)
- Propellers: 2-bladed wood fixed pitch propeller, 8 ft 6 in (2.59 m) diameter

Performance

- Maximum speed: 102 mph (164 km/h, 89 kn) at 10,000 ft (3,000 m)
- Endurance: 2 hr 45 min
- Service ceiling: 16,000 ft (4,900 m)
- Time to altitude: ** 12 min 25 s to 10,000 ft (3,000 m)
  - 27 min 30 s to 15,000 ft (4,600 m)

Armament

- Guns: 1 × 0.303 in (7.7 mm) Vickers machine gun
- Bombs: racks for four 25 lb (11 kg) bombs under fuselage

== See also ==
- 1916 in aviation

Aircraft of comparable role, configuration, and era

- Sopwith Dolphin

Related lists

- List of fighter aircraft
- List of aircraft of the Royal Flying Corps
