= No. 24 Squadron RAF =

Flying squadron of the Royal Air Force

No. 24 Squadron
- Squadron badge
- Active: 1915–1918 (RFC); 1918–1919; 1920–present
- Country: United Kingdom
- Branch: Royal Air Force
- Type: Operational conversion unit
- Role: Air mobility fleet training
- Part of: Air Mobility Force
- Station: RAF Brize Norton
- Nickname: Commonwealth
- Mottos: In omnia parati (Latin for 'Prepared for all things' / 'Ready for anything')
- Aircraft: Boeing C-17A Globemaster III; Airbus A400m Atlas C1

Commanders
- Notable commanders: Major L G Hawker

No. 24 Squadron, also known as No. XXIV Squadron, is a squadron of the Royal Air Force which is the Air Mobility Operational Conversion Unit. Based at RAF Brize Norton in Oxfordshire, the squadron is responsible for aircrew training on the Airbus A400M Atlas and Boeing C-17A Globemaster III. The squadron also provides engineer training for these aircraft.

== History ==
=== First World War (1915–1919) ===
No. 24 Squadron was formed as a squadron of the Royal Flying Corps on 21 September 1915 at Hounslow Heath Aerodrome in Greater London. It arrived in France equipped with the Airco D.H.2 biplane fighter in February 1916. The D.H.2 came with a reputation for spinning because it had a rotary engine "pushing" it, but after Officer Commanding Major Lanoe Hawker demonstrated the recently discovered procedures for pulling out of a spin, the squadron's pilots came to appreciate the type's manoeuvrability.

By early 1917 the DH.2 was outclassed and they were replaced by the Airco DH.5. The DH.5 did not prove suitable as a fighter but the squadron used it in a ground-attack role. The squadron was involved in the Battle of Messines in Belgium, and later the Battle of Cambrai in France. The DH.5 was phased out of operations and the squadron were given the Royal Aircraft Factory SE.5a in December 1917. After a few months in the ground-attack role the squadron returned to air combat operations. By October 1918 the squadron had destroyed two-hundred enemy aircraft. Following the armistice the squadron returned to England and was disbanded in February 1919.

=== Interwar years (1920–1938) ===
On 1 February 1920, the squadron was re-formed at RAF Kenley in Kent as a communications and training squadron. During the General Strike of 1926, because of the lack of a postal services, the squadron was used to deliver government dispatches around the country.

=== Second World War (1939–1945) ===
Following the outbreak of the Second World War in September 1939, the squadron acquired civil airliners which were impressed for wartime service. It provided a detachment in France to run courier services, but with the withdrawal of British troops, it was soon used to evacuate men back to England. Former British Airways and Imperial Airways aircraft were put to use on a network of communications flights including trips to Gibraltar and later Malta.

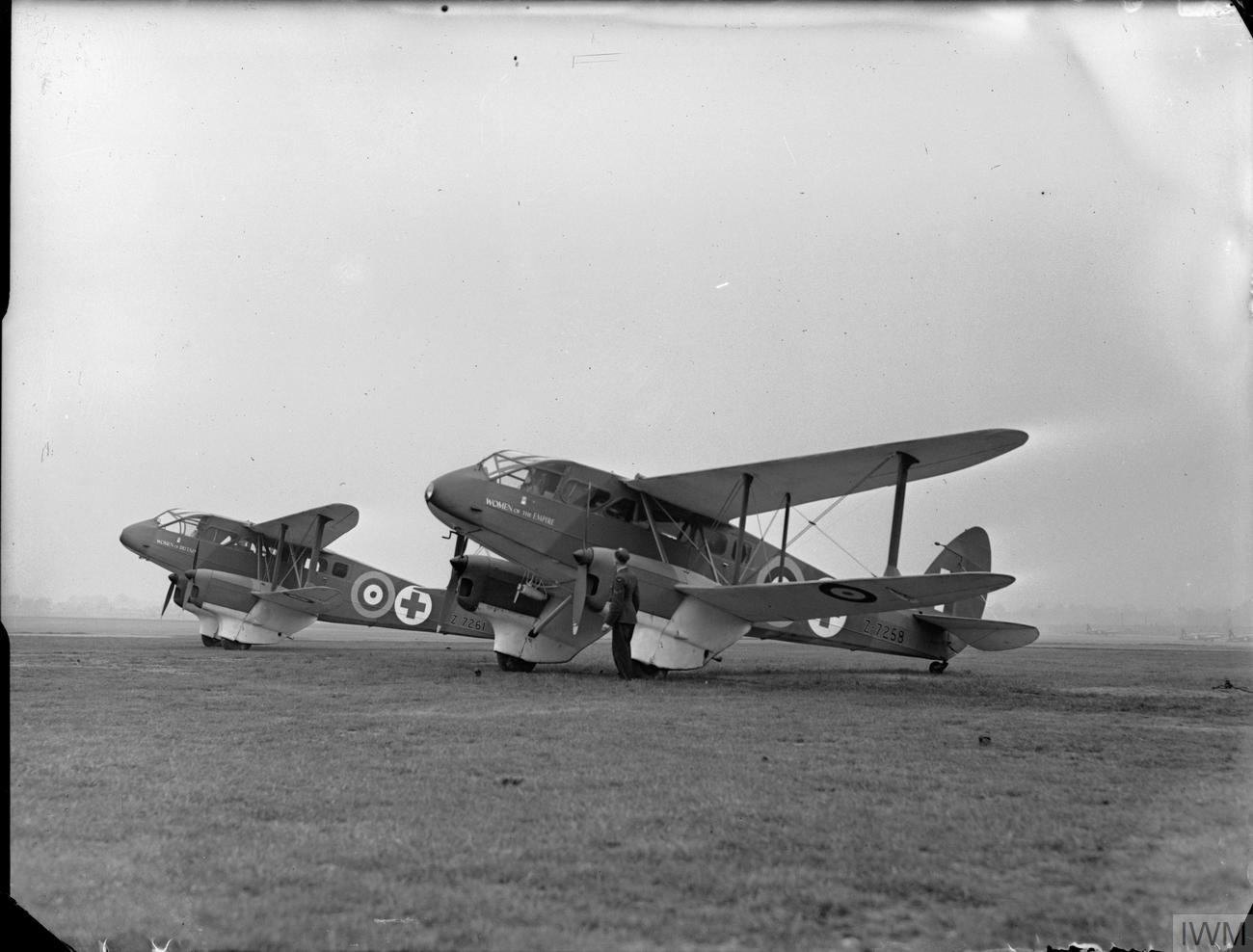
de Havviland Dragon Rapide of No. 20 Squadron in July 1940

The squadron had grown into a large organisation, with a network of routes around the United Kingdom and eventually extended to India. It also operated VIP transports including Sir Winston Churchill's personal aircraft. It was decided to break the squadron up: the internal communication flight became No. 510 Squadron in October 1942. In June 1943 a second squadron, No. 512 Squadron, equipped with the Douglas Dakota was split off from No. 24 Squadron. This left the squadron to concentrate on long distance routes using the Avro York.

=== Cold War (1946–1990s) ===
In February 1946, the squadron left RAF Hendon in Greater London, as the airfield had become too small to operate the larger Yorks and Avro Lancastrians. The squadron was also designated a Commonwealth squadron with crews from various Commonwealth countries joining the squadron strength.

The squadron moved from RAF Colerne to RAF Lyneham in 1968 and re-equipped with the Lockheed C-130 Hercules.

=== 21st century (2000–present) ===
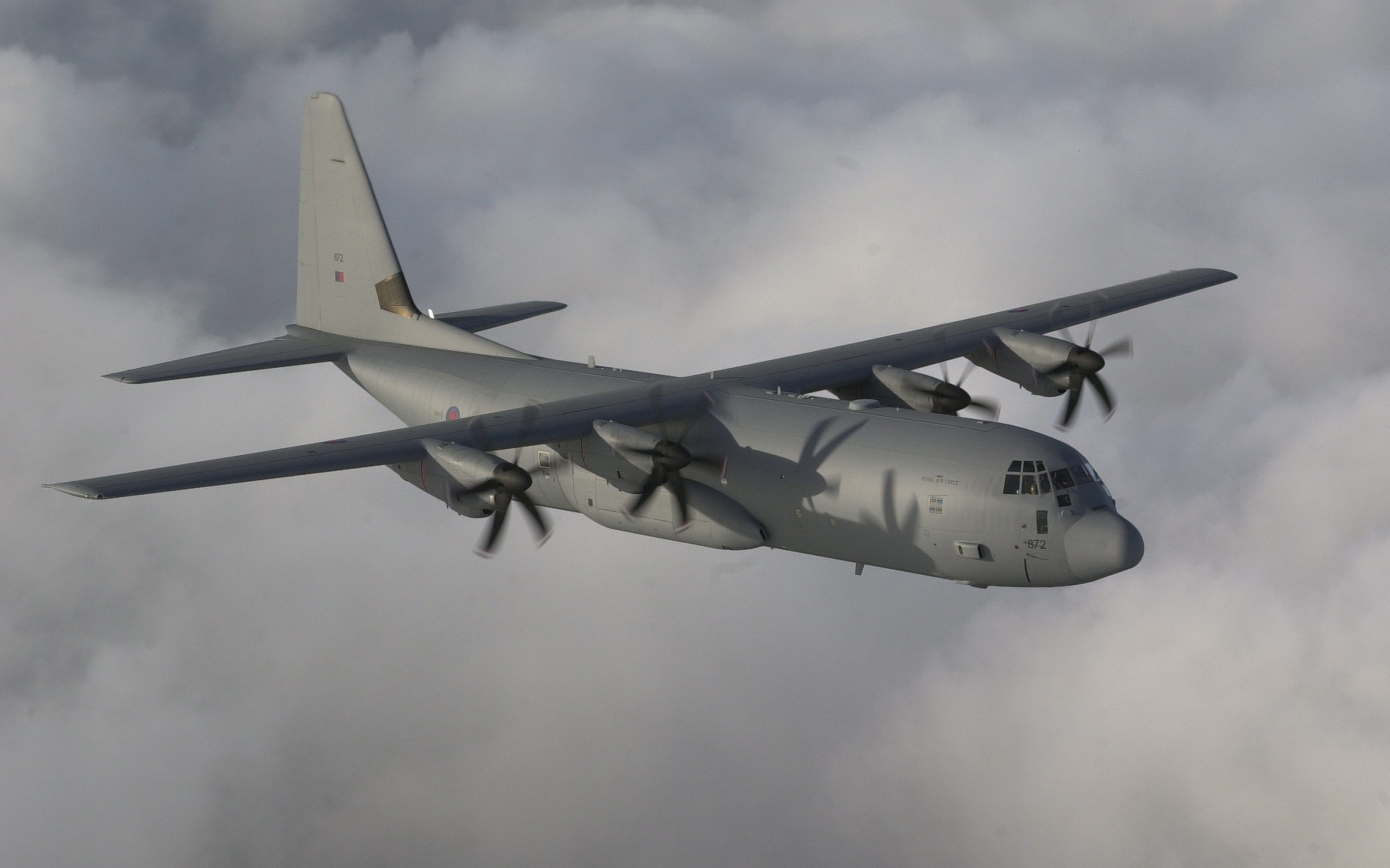
A C-130J Hercules of No. 24 Squadron in 2001

The squadron re-equipped with the new generation Hercules C4 and C5 (RAF designations for the C-130J-30 and C-130J respectively) in 2002. It celebrated 40 years of Hercules operation in 2008 and remained at Lyneham until July 2011 when the squadron relocated to RAF Brize Norton.

In January 2011, No. 24 Squadron started its transition from a front-line Hercules squadron to become the Air Mobility Operational Conversion Unit. This transition brigaded the majority of flying and engineer training within the Air Mobility Force under one specialist training unit. The squadron has responsibility for the provision of training to aircrews flying the Boeing C-17A Globemaster III and Airbus A400M Atlas aircraft, and formerly the C-130J Hercules until its retirement in 2023. As a Central Flying School accredited training establishment, No. 24 Squadron is the professional training body for the Air Mobility Force, delivering flying and engineering training. The squadron also oversees Aircrew Instructor Development delivering initial aircrew instructor courses.

== Aircraft operated ==
No. 24 Squadron have operated the following aircraft:

- Curtiss JN-4 (1915)
- Caudron G.III (1915)
- Avro 504 (1915)
- Royal Aircraft Factory BE.2c (1915)
- Bleriot IX (1915)
- Bristol Scout (1915)
- Maurice Farman Longhorn (1915)
- Maurice Farman Shorthorn (1915)
- Vickers FB.5 (1915–1916)
- Airco DH.2 (1916–1917)
- Airco DH.5 (1917–1918)
- Royal Aircraft Factory SE.5a (1917–1919)
- Bristol F.2 Fighter (1920–1930)
- de Havilland DH.9A (1920–1927)
- Avro 504N (1927–1933)
- de Havilland Moth (1927–1933)
- Westland Wapiti (1927–1933)
- Fairey IIIF (1927–1933)
- Hawker Tomtit (1930–1933)
- Avro Tutor (1931–1932)
- Hawker Hart (1933–1941)
- de Havilland Tiger Moth (1933–1938)
- Hawker Audax (1933–1938)
- de Havilland Dragon Rapide and Dominie (1933–1944)
- Miles Nighthawk (1937–1938)
- de Havilland Express (1937–1943)
- Miles Magister (1938–1940)
- Avro Anson I (1938)
- Miles Mentor (1938–1944)
- Percival Vega Gull (1938–1942)
- de Havilland Leopard Moth (1939–1940)
- de Havilland Fox Moth (1939–1940)
- de Havilland Dragon (1939–1941)
- Lockheed 10 Electra (1939–1942)
- Percival Q.6 (1939–1942)
- de Havilland Puss Moth (1939–1940)
- de Havilland Flamingo (1939–1944)
- Airspeed Envoy (1939–1940)
- Miles Whitney Straight (1940–1942)
- Heston Phoenix (1940)
- Savoia-Marchetti S.73 (1940)
- Douglas DC-3 (1940)
- Avro Anson I (1940)
- Armstrong Whitworth Ensign (1940)
- de Havilland Hornet Moth (1940–1942)
- Airspeed Oxford (1940–1944)
- Parnall Heck III (1941)
- Stinson Reliant (1941–1943)
- Blackburn Botha (1941–1942)
- General Aircraft Cygnet (1941–1942)
- de Havilland Leopard Moth (1941–1942)
- Beech 17 Traveler (1941–1945)
- Lockheed Hudson I (1941–1943)
- Lockheed Hudson II (1941–1942)
- Messerschmitt Bf 108 Aldon (1942)
- Fokker F.XXII (1942–1943)
- Foster Wikner Wicko (1942–1943)
- Lockheed Hudson IV (1942)
- Lockheed Hudson III (1942–1945)
- Heston Phoenix (1942)
- Lockheed Hudson VI (1942–1943)
- Lockheed 12 (1942–1944)
- Percival Proctor (1942–1943)
- Grumman Goose (1943–1944)
- Vickers Wellington XVI (1943–1944)
- Avro York I (1943–1944)
- Douglas Dakota (1943–1952)
- Avro Anson XX (1944)
- Douglas Skymaster (1944–1945)
- Avro Lancastrian C.2 (1946–1949)
- Avro York C.1 (1946–1951)
- Vickers Valetta C.1 (1950)
- Handley Page Hastings C.1 (1950)
- Handley Page Hastings C.2 (1951–1968)
- Handley Page Hastings C.4 (1951–1968)
- Lockheed Hercules C-130K (1968–2000)
- Lockheed Hercules C-130J (2000–2023)
- Airbus A400M Atlas (2013–present)
- Boeing C-17A Globemaster III (2021–present)

== Heritage ==
The squadron's badge features a blackcock, selected because of its speed and strength on the wing, the cock is in fighting attitude to suggest the squadron's ability to turn itself into a war fighting unit at short notice, despite a peacetime communications role. The badge was approved by King George VI in June 1937.

The squadron's motto is In omnia parati (Latin for 'Prepared for all things' / 'Ready for anything').

== Battle honours ==
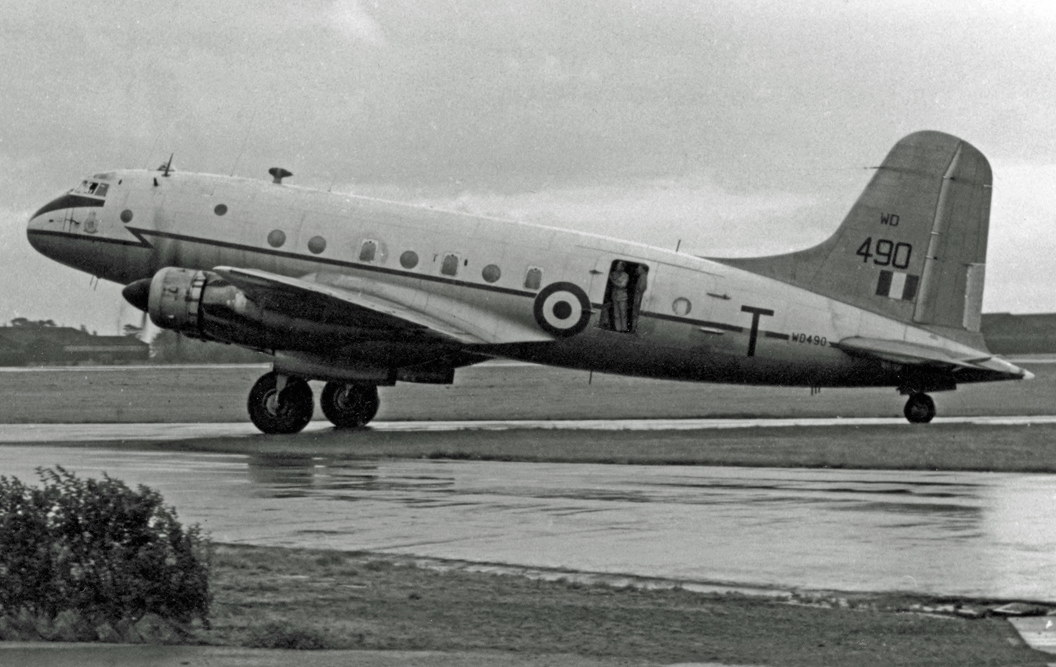
A No. 24 Squadron Handley Page Hastings C.2 at RAF Topcliffe in Yorkshire in 1952

No. 24 Squadron has received the following battle honours. Those marked with an asterisk (*) may be emblazoned on the squadron standard.

- Western Front (1916–1918)*
- Somme (1916)*
- Somme (1918)
- Amiens (1918)*
- Hindenburg Line (1918)*
- France and Low Countries (1939–1940)*
- Malta (1942)*
- North Africa (1942–1943)*
- Italy (1943–1944)
- Burma (1944–1945)*
- Gulf (1991)
- Afghanistan (2001–2014)
- Iraq (2003–2011)*

== See also ==
- List of Royal Air Force aircraft squadrons
