= List of World War I flying aces from the British Empire =

The following aviators from the British Empire were credited with five or more aerial victories during World War I. This list is complete.

== 20 or more victories (83 names) ==
- Billy Bishop
- Edward "Mick" Mannock
- Raymond Collishaw
- James McCudden
- Andrew Beauchamp-Proctor
- Donald MacLaren
- William George Barker
- Robert A. Little
- George McElroy
- Roderic Dallas
- Albert Ball
- Tom F. Hazell
- Philip F. Fullard
- Charles George Gass
- John Inglis Gilmour
- William Lancelot Jordan
- Alfred Atkey
- William Gordon Claxton
- James Ira Thomas Jones
- Joseph Stewart Temple Fall
- Frederick McCall
- Henry Winslow Woollett
- Frank Granger Quigley
- Geoffrey Hilton Bowman
- Samuel Kinkead
- Andrew Edward McKeever
- Charles Dawson Booker
- Percy Jack Clayson
- Harry Cobby
- Leonard Henry Rochford
- Albert Desbrisay Carter
- John Everard Gurdon
- Reginald Hoidge
- Dennis Latimer
- Clifford McEwen
- Thomas Percy Middleton
- Frank Ormond Soden
- Arthur Whealy
- Ronald Malcolm Fletcher
- William Frederick James Harvey
- Elwyn King
- Gerald Joseph Constable Maxwell
- William Ernest Staton
- William McKenzie Thomson
- Keith Caldwell
- Robert J. O. Compston
- Stanley Wallace Rosevear
- Peter Carpenter
- George S. L. Hayward
- Harry G. E. Luchford
- Tom Cecil Noel
- William Ernest Shields
- James Anderson Slater
- William Melville Alexander
- William Charles Campbell
- Mathew Brown Frew
- Howard Percy Lale
- Alexander Pentland
- Harold Whistler
- Thomas Sinclair Harrison
- Louis Fleeming Jenkin
- Cecil Frederick King
- Arthur Ernest Newland
- Benjamin Roxburgh-Smith
- Joseph Leonard Maries White
- Francis Cubbon
- Harold Leslie Edwards
- Charles Hickey
- William John Charles Kennedy-Cochran-Patrick
- Richard Maybery
- Richard Minifie
- George Edwin Thomson
- Leonard Monteagle Barlow
- Douglas John Bell
- Kenneth Burns Conn
- Edgar Johnston
- Camille Lagesse
- Ian Donald Roy McDonald
- Keith Park
- Charles G. Ross
- Walter Southey
- Frederick Thayre
- Arthur Rhys-Davids
- Francis Warrington Gillet

== 15–19 victories (62 names) ==
- Horace Barton
- Wilfred Beaver
- Andrew Cowper
- Arthur Bradfield Fairclough
- Cedric Howell
- Leslie Powell
- Arthur Reed
- Ellis Vair Reid
- Alan Wilkinson
- George Chisholm MacKay
- William Molesworth
- Maurice Newnham
- John Todd
- John Lightfoot Trollope
- Ronald Bannerman
- Alfred Williams Carter
- Carl Frederick Falkenberg
- George Everard Gibbons
- Fred Parkinson Holliday
- Reginald Makepeace
- John Pinder
- Edwin Swale
- Edmund Tempest
- Walter Tyrrell
- Owen Baldwin
- Gerald Gordon Bell
- Henry John Burden
- John Stanley Chick
- John Cowell
- Bruce Digby-Worsley
- Stearne Tighe Edwards
- Ernest Elton
- Robert Foster
- Robert Grosvenor
- Allan Hepburn
- Sidney Highwood
- Frank Johnson
- Oliver Redgate
- Francis Smith
- David Stewart
- Christoffel Venter
- Anthony Wall
- Lawrence Coombes
- Cyril Crowe
- Charles Cudemore
- Ralph Curtis
- Ernest Deighton
- George Gates
- James Alpheus Glen
- Harry King Goode
- John Rutherford Gordon
- John Edmund Greene
- Edwin Hayne
- Frank Hobson
- John Jones
- Andrew Kiddie
- Harold Mellings
- Alfred Mills
- Roy Cecil Phillipps
- Herbert Richardson
- Harold Stackard
- Frank Weare

== 11–14 victories (157 names) ==
- Colin Brown
- Carleton Main Clement
- Lawrence Coombes
- Arthur Coningham
- Euan Dickson
- Charles Findlay
- Maxwell Findlay
- James Fitz-Morris
- Frank George Gibbons
- Albert Earl Godfrey
- Frank Gorringe
- Arthur Keen
- Ronald T. Mark
- Maurice Mealing
- Walter Naylor
- James Dennis Payne
- William Sidebottom
- John Victor Sorsoleil
- George Thomson
- Arthur Vigers
- Hazel Wallace
- Herbert Gilles Watson
- Noel Webb
- Thomas F. Williams
- Frederick C. Armstrong
- Charles C. Banks
- Reginald Brading
- Geoffrey Hornblower Cock
- Douglas Graham Cooke
- Sidney Cottle
- Wilfred A. Curtis
- Albert Enstone
- Gavin L. Graham
- Harold A. Hamersley
- Oscar Heron
- Spencer B. Horn
- George R. Howsam
- Ernest Charles Hoy
- Harold B. Hudson
- Solomon Clifford Joseph
- Ronald M. Keirstead
- John Letts
- Sydney Tyndall Liversedge
- William E. G. Mann
- John G. Manuel
- Wop May
- Thomas L. Purdom
- Francis James Ralph
- Harry Gosford Reeves
- George R. Riley
- Frederick Sowrey
- Stanley Stanger
- Eric John Stephens
- Francis S. Symondson
- John Howard Umney
- Desmond Uniacke
- Oliver H. D. Vickers
- David John Weston
- Walter Bertram Wood
- John Oliver Andrews
- Brian Edmund Baker
- Thomas Baker
- Gerald A. Birks
- Clement G. Boothroyd
- Quintin Brand
- Edwin C. Bromley
- Raymond Brownell
- Oliver Bryson
- Walter M. Carlaw
- Percival V. G. Chambers
- Edwin A. Clear
- Francis James Davies
- Frank Godfrey
- Ernest Hardcastle
- William Leeming Harrison
- William Henry Hubbard
- John E. L. Hunter
- Gordon Budd Irving
- William Stanley Jenkins
- George Hubert Kemp
- Gwilym Hugh Lewis
- Frederic Ives Lord
- Roby Lewis Manuel
- Roy Manzer
- Norman Mawle
- Douglas McGregor
- Kenneth Barbour Montgomery
- Josiah Lewis Morgan
- Ian Napier
- Walter Noble
- Guy William Price
- John Steele Ralston
- Henry Coyle Rath
- Cecil Roy Richards
- Alfred William Saunders
- James Scaramanga
- Maurice D. G. Scott
- Alexander MacDonald Shook
- Ross MacPherson Smith
- Reginald Soar
- William Samuel Stephenson
- Leonard Taplin
- Chester Thompson
- Adrian Tonks
- Richard M. Trevethan
- Melville Wells Waddington
- Dennis Waight
- James White
- Fred Everest Banbury
- Harold F. Beamish
- Alexander Beck
- Philip Scott Burge
- Arnold Jacques Chadwick
- Roy W. Chappell
- Hugh Claye
- Clive Franklyn Collett
- Thomas Colvill-Jones
- Hiram Frank Davison
- Harold Day
- William Duncan
- Trevor Durrant
- Thomas Elliott
- John C. B. Firth
- Henry Garnet Forrest
- William M. Fry
- Frederick J. Gibbs
- Charles D. B. Green
- Thomas M. Harries
- John Herbert Hedley
- Leslie Norman Hollinghurst
- Geoffrey H. Hooper
- Campbell Hoy
- Geoffrey Forrest Hughes
- Patrick Huskinson
- William Roy Irwin
- Mansell Richard James
- George Owen Johnson
- Arthur G. Jones-Williams
- Herbert Joseph Larkin
- Walter H. Longton
- Charles M. Maude
- Malcolm C. McGregor
- Finlay McQuistan
- James Hart Mitchell
- Sydney A. Oades
- Harold Anthony Oaks
- Herbert A. Patey
- Leonard A. Payne
- Clement W. Payton
- George E. Randall
- Hervey Rhodes
- Cyril Ridley
- Thomas Rose
- Ivan C. Sanderson
- John Stevenson Stubbs
- Albert Gregory Waller
- Arthur W. Wood
- Wilfred Ernest Young

== 10 victories (47 names) ==
- Laurence W. Allen
- Edgar O. Amm
- Gordon Apps
- Edward Dawson Atkinson
- Herbert H. Beddow
- Hilliard Brooke Bell
- Robert A. Birkbeck
- Lloyd S. Breadner
- Arthur Roy Brown
- Frederick Elliott Brown
- Sydney Carlin
- Robert L. Chidlaw-Roberts
- Adrian Cole
- Valentine Collins
- Jack Armand Cunningham
- Douglas Arthur Davies
- Edgar G. Davies
- Robert Dodds
- Aubrey Ellwood
- William H. Farrow
- Cecil Gardner
- Thomas Gerrard
- Gerald Gibbs
- Stanley Goble
- George Stacey Hodson
- Will Hubbard
- William Edward Jenkins
- Alfred Michael Koch
- Patrick Anthony Langan-Byrne
- John Joseph Malone
- Alfred E. McKay
- Guy Borthwick Moore
- Gordon Olley
- John Paynter
- Croye Pithey
- Arthur Randall
- Harold Redler
- Harry Robinson
- Indra Lal Roy
- John Rudkin
- Reginald H. Rusby
- Alfred Shepherd
- Saint Cyprian Tayler
- Frank Harold Taylor
- John Henry Tudhope
- William Lewis Wells
- Russell Winnicott

== 9 victories (80 names) ==
- Cyril John Agelasto
- Charles Arnison
- Harold H. Balfour
- William Thomas Barnes
- Walter Beales
- Rex George Bennett
- James Binnie
- John Denis Breakey
- Frederick Britnell
- William Henry Brown
- George William Bulmer
- Francis Dominic Casey
- Thomas Cassady
- Leonard Arthur Christian
- Eric Douglas Cummings
- Donald Cunnell
- Hector Daniel
- George Darvill
- Richard Dawes
- Roger Del'Haye
- George Dixon
- John Doyle
- Christopher Draper
- Arthur Thomas Drinkwater
- James Henry Forman
- Frederick Gordon
- Robert MacIntyre Gordon
- Acheson Goulding
- William Edward Green
- George Hackwill
- James Hardman
- Frederick Hunt
- Reginald Johns
- Norman Cyril Jones
- Harold Spencer Kerby
- Leslie Walter King
- Francis Kitto
- Charles Lavers
- George V. Learmond
- James Leith Leith
- Selden Long
- Cyril Lowe
- Norman Macmillan
- Cecil Marchant
- Ronald Mauduit
- Reginald Maxwell
- John Sutholand McDonald
- Christopher McEvoy
- David MacKay McGoun
- Horace Merritt
- John Theobald Milne
- Basil Moody
- Richard Burnard Munday
- Charles Napier
- Ernest Norton
- Arthur Noss
- Conn Standish O'Grady
- Samuel Parry
- Edmond Pierce
- Frank Ransley
- Valentine Reed
- William Reed
- George Reid
- William Wendell Rogers
- Herbert Rowley
- Ernest James Salter
- Joseph Siddall
- Charles Sims
- Arthur Solly
- Anthony Spence
- Louis Mark Thompson
- Ronald Thornely
- Frederick Dudley Travers
- Ronald William Turner
- Guy Wareing
- Kenneth Bowman Watson
- Albert Edward Wear
- Thomas Williams
- Alec Williamson

== 8 victories (109 names) ==
- John William Aldred
- Gerald Frank Anderson
- Geoffrey Bailey
- Charles Bartlett
- Bernard Beanlands
- Donald Beard
- Edwin Benbow
- Maurice Benjamin
- Henry Biziou
- Gregory Blaxland
- Giles Blennerhasset
- Clive Brewster-Joske
- Edric Broadberry
- Alfred John Brown
- James Martin Child
- Robert David Coath
- Edwin Cole
- James Geoffrey Coombe
- Leslie Court
- William Craig
- Henry Crowe
- James Dawe
- John D. De Pencier
- Percy Douglas
- Peter Roy Maxwell Drummond
- Gordon Duncan
- William Durrand
- Harold E. Easton
- Leonard Herbert Emsden
- Harold Ross Eycott-Martin
- Garfield Finlay
- Desmond Fitzgibbon
- Austin Lloyd Fleming
- Cyril Gladman
- Clive Glynn
- James Grant
- Gilbert W. M. Green
- Eustace Grenfell
- Victor Groom
- Reuben Hammersley
- Frederick Harlock
- Herbert George Hegarty
- Alfred Hemming
- George Hicks
- D'Arcy Fowlis Hilton
- Ivan F. Hind
- William Norman Holmes
- Thomas Stanley Horry
- Richard Howard
- Hubert Hunt
- Ernest Graham Joy
- Kenneth William Junor
- Robert Kirby Kirkman
- Arthur Gerald Knight
- Sidney Knights
- Kenneth Leask
- Forde Leathley
- Cecil Arthur Lewis
- Alan Light
- George Lloyd
- Dudley Lloyd-Evans
- William Myron MacDonald
- William John MacKenzie
- Reginald Malcolm
- George Ivan Douglas Marks
- Ernest Masters
- M. B. Mather
- Hugh Maund
- John McCudden
- James McDonald
- Roderick McDonald
- Henry Meintjes
- Alexander W. Merchant
- Leslie Mitchell
- Henry Moody
- Joseph Michael John Moore
- Keith K. Muspratt
- Thomas Nash
- Eric Olivier
- William O'Toole
- Eric Pashley
- Arthur Peck
- Philip B. Prothero
- John Quested
- Lionel Rees
- Charles Robson
- William Rooper
- Alexander Roulstone
- William J. Rutherford
- Harold Satchell
- Franklin Saunders
- Owen Scholte
- Walter Scott
- Herbert Sellars
- John Edward Sharman
- George Simpson
- Robert Sloley
- John Henry Smith
- Langley Smith
- William Watson Smith
- Bertram Smyth
- John Summers
- Leslie Sutherland
- Clifford Tolman
- Thomas Traill
- John Warner
- Leslie Warren
- Claude Melnot Wilson
- William Wright

== 7 victories (133 names) ==
- Frank Alberry
- Charles Allen
- Ernest Antcliffe
- Lionel Ashfield
- Thomas Barkell
- John Bateman
- Alan Duncan Bell-Irving
- Thomas Birmingham
- William Harry Bland
- Cecil Brock
- George Ai Brooke
- Stanton Bunting
- David Luther Burgess
- Lynn Campbell
- Leslie Capel
- Robert Chandler
- Charles Chapman
- William Chisam
- Arthur Claydon
- Stanley Cockerell
- Arthur Cyril Cooper
- Arthur Gabbettis Cooper
- Sidney Cowan
- Roland Critchley
- Edward Crundall
- Alec Cunningham-Reid
- Rowan Daly
- Ernest Davies
- Ernest Davis
- James Dewhirst
- Roy Dodds
- Henry Dolan
- Thomas A. Doran
- Arthur Draisey
- Herbert Drewitt
- Cedric Edwards
- Herbert Ellis
- Conway Farrell
- George Buchanan Foster
- Gordon Fox-Rule
- Adrian Franklyn
- Maurice Freehill
- John Gamon
- Eric Gilroy
- Walter Grant
- William Edrington Gray
- Wilfred Green
- John Griffith
- Frederick Hall
- Herbert Hamilton
- Herbert Hartley
- Lanoe Hawker
- Ian Henderson
- William Carrall Hilborn
- Charles Hill
- Richard Frank Hill
- John Hills
- Edward Hoare
- Percy Hobson
- Jeffrey Batters Home-Hay
- Norman William Hustings
- Arthur Jarvis
- Louis Jarvis
- Archie Nathaniel Jenks
- Alan Jerrard
- Albert Leslie Jones
- George Jones
- Harold Joslyn
- Edward Patrick Kenney
- Walter Kirk
- Frederick John Knowles
- Maurice Le Blanc-Smith
- Arthur Lee
- Alfred Alexander Leitch
- Thomas Le Mesurier
- Hector MacDonald
- Peter MacDougall
- Norman MacGregor
- John MacKereth
- William MacLanachan
- Malcolm Plaw MacLeod
- Henry Maddocks
- Roy Kirkwood McConnell
- Paul McGinness
- Ernest Stanley Moore
- Ernest Morrow
- William Nel
- Charles Odell
- Augustus Orlebar
- Hugh Owen
- Robert Owen
- John Albert Page
- Arthur Palliser
- William Patrick
- William Pearson
- George Peters
- Frank Potter
- Stuart Harvey Pratt
- John Carberry Preston
- Stephen Price
- William Price
- Stanley Puffer
- Lewis Ray
- Lancelot Richardson
- James Robb
- Charles Robinson
- Howard Saint
- Douglas Savage
- Harry Scandrett
- Kenneth Gordon Seth-Smith
- Leonard Slatter
- Emerson Smith
- Frederick Stanton
- Charles Steele
- Charles Owen Stone
- Gilbert Strange
- Charles Stubbs
- Oliver Sutton
- Arthur Gilbert Vivian Taylor
- James Tennant
- David Tidmarsh
- William Tinsley
- Alexander Tranter
- Norman Trescowthick
- Francis Turner
- Awdry Vaucour
- Harold Walkerdine
- James Wellwood
- Harold Albert White
- Hugh White
- Percy Williams
- Percy Wilson
- Albert Woodbridge

== 6 victories (128 names) ==
- Ivan Agabeg
- Percival Appleby
- John Aspinall
- Robert Barbour
- John Barlow
- Frank Bell
- Eric Betts
- Nicholson Boulton
- Percy Boulton
- Clifford Bowman
- Arthur Britton
- Eric Brookes
- Leslie William Burbidge
- James Bush
- William Cairnes
- William Cambray
- John Candy
- Douglas Carbery
- Robert Chalmers
- Thomas Chiltern
- Henry Gordon Clappison
- Edward Clarke
- Harris George Clements
- John Henry Colbert
- Reginald Conder
- Gerald Kempster Cooper
- Maurice Cooper
- Irving Corey
- Earl Frederick Crabb
- Thomas Culling
- William Curphey
- John Daley
- Charles Dance
- Edward Darby
- Horace Balfour Davey
- Charles Davidson
- Horace Debenham
- John Elmer Drummond
- Denis Edwin Edgley
- Cyril Askew Eyre
- Robert Farquhar
- Daniel Galbraith
- George Gardiner
- Rupert Gifford
- George H. D. Gossip
- Herbert Gould
- James Green
- Duncan Grinnell-Milne
- Alfred Haines
- David S. Hall
- Stanley Hamblin
- Leslie Hamilton
- Geoffrey Hemming
- Cyril Heywood
- Walter G. R. Hinchliffe
- Philip Holligan
- Victor Huston
- Bruce Jackman
- H. S. Jackson
- Philip Andrew Johnston
- Noel Keeble
- Ernest Tilton Sumpter Kelly
- George Lawson
- Thomas Lewis
- H. Lindfield
- George Lingham
- Alwyne Travers Loyd
- Thomas Luke
- Andrew MacGregor
- Garnet Malley
- T. W. Martin
- F. H. Maynard
- Malcolm McCall
- Robert McKenzie
- Robert McLaughlin
- Oscar McMaking
- Leslie McRobert
- Earl Stanley Meek
- William Meggitt
- Frank Tremar Sibly Menendez
- William James Middleton
- Archibald Miller
- William Miller
- Norman Craig Millman
- Laurence Minot
- Hugh Fitzgerald Moore
- Gerald Ewart Nash
- Ernest Edward Owen
- Augustus Paget
- Medley Parlee
- Laurence Pearson
- Geoffrey Pidcock
- Sydney Pope
- Frederick Powell
- Thomas G. Rae
- Richard Raymond-Barker
- Alan Rice-Oxley
- Harry Rigby
- Cyril H. Sawyer
- Laurence Henry Scott
- Evander Shapard
- Thomas Sharpe
- Edward A. Simpson
- David Esplin Smith
- John Smith-Grant
- Cyril Richard Smythe
- Arthur Spurling
- William Strugnell
- Rothesay Stuart Wortley
- Ronald Sykes
- Harry Symons
- Cecil Thompson
- Claud Robert James Thompson
- Albert Tonkin
- James Hamilton Traill
- George Trapp
- Philip Tudhope
- Thomas Tuffield
- William Tyrell
- Eric Walker
- Bernard Albert Walkerdine
- Stephen Reginald Parke Walter
- Harry Watson
- William Westwood
- William A. Wheeler
- Victor White
- Frederick Wilton
- Harry Wood

== 5 victories (247 names) ==
- John Aldridge
- George Benson Anderson
- Arnold Ansell
- D'Urban Armstrong
- Anthony Arnold
- Thomas Henry Wright
- Edward Asbury
- Lionel Ashfield
- Rupert Atkinson
- Frank Babbage
- Lovell Baker
- Charles Gordon Bell
- William Benger
- Risdon Mackenzie Bennett
- Ronald Berlyn
- Frank Billinge
- Basil Blackett
- George Walker Blaiklock
- Arthur Winston Blake
- Alfred Blenkiron
- Charles Blizard
- William Otway Boger
- William Bond
- Edward Borgfeldt Booth
- Alan Bott
- William Bottrill
- Francis Bowles
- Godfrey Brembridge
- Orlando Bridgeman
- Allan Brown
- Sydney Brown
- John Bruce Norton
- Malcolm Burger
- Lawrence Callahan
- Douglas Cameron
- Edward Caulfield-Kelly
- Reginald Morse Charley
- James Child
- Alexander Goodlet Clark
- William Clarke
- Lewis Collins
- Harry Compton
- Everett Cook
- George J. Cox
- George Montague Cox
- Fergus Craig
- Kelvin Crawford
- Gerard Crole
- John Crompton
- Robert James Cullen
- Lumsden Cummings
- Frederick Cunninghame
- Sydney Dalrymple
- Charles Darwin
- Clive Davies
- Llewelyn Davies
- Miles Day
- Philip De Fontenay
- Bruno De Roeper
- Edward Barfoot Drake
- Chester S. Duffus
- William Dyke
- Arthur Easterbrook
- Edward Eaton
- Charles Eddy
- Herbert James Edwards
- Horace Eldon
- Hugh William Elliott
- William Elliott
- Sidney Emerson Ellis
- Henry Evans
- Ernest Foot
- George W. Furlow
- Hudson Fysh
- Richard Gammon
- James Victor Gascoyne
- George Gauld
- Dennis Henry Stacey Gilbertson
- Wilfred Bertie Giles
- John Gillanders
- William Gillespie
- William Gilson
- Harry Gompertz
- Michael Gonne
- Herbert Barrett Good
- Henry Goodison
- Kenneth Gopsill
- Richard Gordon-Bennett
- Ronald Graham
- Edward Grange
- Charles Gossage Grey
- Edward Gribben
- Hugh Griffith
- William Grossart
- John Playford Hales
- John Herbert Hall
- Robert Hall
- Joseph E. Hallonquist
- Arthur William Hammond
- Earl Hand
- James McKinley Hargreaves
- Howard Harker
- Arthur Travers Harris
- Charles Harrison
- William Harrop
- Edward Hartigan
- Hugh Hay
- Roger Hay
- Eustace Headlam
- Robert Herring
- George Frederick Hines
- William Hodgkinson
- Les Holden
- Robert Holme
- Percy Howe
- Malcolm Clifford Howell
- David Hughes
- Eric Yorath Hughes
- Thomas Hunter
- Cyril Edward Hurst
- George Hyde
- Arthur Gordon Jarvis
- Charles Jeffs
- Olaus Johnsen
- Percy Griffith Jones
- M. V. Kilroy
- James Knowles
- Frederick J. Kydd
- Kenneth Laing
- Conrad Lally
- David Langlands
- Sydney Frank Langstone
- James Latta
- Frederic Laurence
- James Lennox
- John Douglas Lightbody
- Ernest Lindup
- Robert Hazen Little
- George Lloyd
- John Lloyd Williams
- Reginald Lowe
- Charles Lupton
- Colin Glen Orr MacAndrew
- Ross Morrison MacDonald
- Harry MacKay
- Loudoun MacLean
- John Finley Noel MacRae
- Patrick Scarsfield Manley
- Leslie Morton Mansbridge
- William Stanley Mansell
- Stanley Masding
- Jack Mason
- William Drummond Matheson
- William Maxted
- Ronald McClintock
- George McCormack
- John McNeaney
- Russell Fern McRae
- Harold Medlicott
- Francis Mellersh
- Zenos Miller
- Kenneth Charles Mills
- Harold Molyneux
- John Towlson Morgan
- William John Mostyn
- Harold Edgar Mott
- Redford Mulock
- John Murison
- Donald Frederick Murmann
- Ernest Mustard
- Hugh Nangle
- Roger Neville
- Thomas Henry Newsome
- Percy Olieff
- Thomas Alfred Oliver
- Ernest Edward Owen
- John Sidney Owens
- Carrick Paul
- Edward Pennell
- Edmund Heaton Peverell
- Charles Pickthorn
- Gerald Pilditch
- Sidney Platel
- George Ramsden Poole
- Kenneth Porter
- Harold Johnstone Pratt
- Walbanke Ashby Pritt
- Thomas Proctor
- John Pugh
- Hartley Pullan
- W. C. Purvis
- Arthur Rullion Rattray
- John William Rayner
- Guy Reid
- Alan Incell Riley alias A. G. Riley
- Norman Roberts
- John Robertson
- John Russell
- William Sanday
- Robert Saundby
- Edward Sayers
- Alan John Lance Scott
- Joseph Powell Seabrook
- John Seerly
- Christopher Shannon
- Frank Sharpe
- Eric Landon Simonson
- Lambert Sloot
- Wallace Alexander Smart
- George Henry Benjamin Smith
- Harry Coleman Smith
- James Robert Smith
- Sydney Philip Smith
- William Thomas Smith
- Neil Smuts
- Wilfred Sneath
- Ian Oliver Stead
- Thomas Frederick Stephenson
- Frank Stevens
- Oliver Stewart
- Claud Stokes
- Edgar Taylor
- Patrick Gordon Taylor
- Meredith Thomas
- Anthony Joseph Hill Thornton
- Herbert Travers
- John Seymour Turnbull
- Arthur Henry Turner
- John Vessey
- Kenneth MacKenzie Walker
- William Walker
- John Wallwork
- Edward Henry Ward
- George Arthur Welsh
- Mortimer Sackville West
- Lewis Whitehead
- Charles Whitham
- Robert Kenneth Whitney
- Edward George Herbert Caradoc Williams
- Francis Jefferies Williams
- Cecil Frederick Charles Wilson
- Rupert Randolph Winter
- John Womersley
- Charles Woollven
- Charles Edward Worthington
- Victor Maslin Yeates
- Graham Conacher Young
- Edmund Leonard Zink
