= List of World War I aces credited with 7 victories =

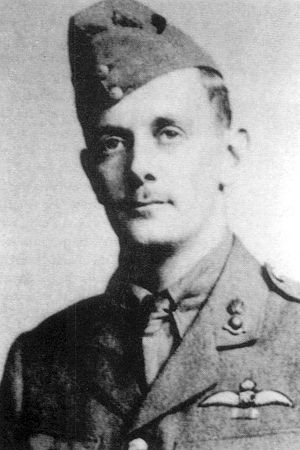
Lanoe Hawker was awarded the first Victoria Cross to a fighter pilot - for shooting down three aircraft in one day. He achieved seven victories before being shot down by Manfred von Richthofen.

The term ace (now commonly flying ace) was first used by French newspapers during World War I, describing Adolphe Pégoud as l'as ('the ace'), after he downed five German aircraft. When aircraft began to shoot or force down other aircraft, systems to count "air victories" were subsequently developed. The American qualification of five victories eventually became the standard, even though other air services had previously used differing figures.

While "ace" status was most often won by fighter pilots, bomber and reconnaissance crews, and observers in two-seater aircraft such as the Bristol F.2b ("Bristol Fighter"), also destroyed enemy aircraft. If a two-seater aircraft destroyed an aircraft, both crew members were credited with a victory. Because pilots usually teamed with differing observer/gunners in two-seater aircraft, an observer might be an ace when his pilot was not, and vice versa. The few aces among combat aviators have historically accounted for the majority of air-to-air victories in military history.

Loss of records by mischance and the passage of time complicates reconstructing the actual count for given aces. The scores presented in the list cannot be definitive, but are based on itemized lists that are the best available sources of information. Aces are listed after verifying the date and location of combat, and the foe vanquished, for every victory accredited by an aviator's home air service using their own aerial victory standards. Those victories for which the evidence is unavailable or fragmentary have been excluded from the victory count.

== Aces ==
This along with the symbolic dagger †, indicates that the pilot was known to be either killed in action, missing in action, died of wounds, or killed in a flying accident during World War I.

Name	Country	Air service(s) including post-war	Victories
Frank Alberry	Australia	Australian Flying Corps	7
Charles Allen	United Kingdom	Royal Naval Air Service, Royal Air Force	7
Fritz Anders	German Empire	Luftstreitkräfte	7
Ernest Antcliffe	United Kingdom	Royal Flying Corps, Royal Air Force	7
Lionel Ashfield	United Kingdom	Royal Naval Air Service, Royal Air Force	7
Alfred Auger†	France	Aéronautique Militaire	7
Thomas Barkell	Australia	Australian Flying Corps	7
Gerhard Bassenge	German Empire	Luftstreitkräfte	7
John Bateman	United Kingdom	Royal Flying Corps, Royal Air Force	7
François Battesti	France	Aéronautique Militaire	7
Alan Duncan Bell-Irving	Canada	Royal Flying Corps, Royal Air Force, Royal Canadian Air Force	7
Charles J. Biddle	United States	Aéronautique Militaire, United States Army Air Service	7
Thomas Birmingham	Canada	Royal Flying Corps, Royal Air Force	7
William Harry Bland	United Kingdom	Royal Flying Corps, Royal Air Force	7
André Louis Bosson†	France	Aéronautique Militaire	7
Cecil Brock	Canada	Royal Naval Air Service, Royal Air Force	7
George Ai Brooke	United Kingdom	Royal Flying Corps, Royal Air Force	7
Helmut Brünig	German Empire	Luftstreitkräfte	7
Archibald Buchanan	United States	Royal Naval Air Service, Royal Air Force	7
Stanton Bunting	United Kingdom	Royal Flying Corps, Royal Air Force	7
David Luther Burgess	Canada	Royal Flying Corps, Royal Air Force	7
Lynn Campbell†	Canada	Royal Flying Corps, Royal Air Force	7
Eugene Camplan	France	Aéronautique Militaire	7
Leslie Capel	United Kingdom	Royal Flying Corps, Royal Air Force	7
Reed Chambers	United States	United States Army Air Service	7
Robert Chandler	United Kingdom	Royal Flying Corps, Royal Air Force	7
Charles Chapman†	United Kingdom	Royal Flying Corps	7
Fernand Henri Chavannes	France	Aéronautique Militaire	7
William Chisam	United Kingdom	Royal Naval Air Service	7
Arthur Claydon†	United Kingdom	Royal Flying Corps, Royal Air Force	7
Stanley Cockerell	United Kingdom	Royal Flying Corps, Royal Air Force	7
James Connelly	United States	Aéronautique Militaire	7
Harvey Weir Cook	United States	United States Army Air Service	7
Arthur Cyril Cooper	United Kingdom	Royal Flying Corps, Royal Air Force	7
Arthur Gabbettis Cooper	United Kingdom	Royal Flying Corps, Royal Air Force	7
Sidney Cowan†	United Kingdom	Royal Flying Corps	7
Jesse Creech	United States	Royal Flying Corps, United States Army Air Service	7
Roland Critchley†	United Kingdom	Royal Flying Corps, Royal Air Force	7
Edward Crundall	United Kingdom	Royal Naval Air Service, Royal Air Force	7
Alec Cunningham-Reid	United Kingdom	Royal Flying Corps, Royal Air Force	7
Hermann Dahlmann	German Empire	Luftstreitkräfte	7
Rowan Daly	United Kingdom	Royal Naval Air Service, Royal Air Force	7
Ernest Davies	Australia	Australian Flying Corps	7
Ernest Davis	Canada	Royal Flying Corps, Royal Air Force	7
Pierre De Cazenove De Pradines	France	Aéronautique Militaire	7
Pierre Delage†	France	Aéronautique Militaire	7
Robert Delannoy	France	Aéronautique Militaire	7
François Delzenne	France	Aéronautique Militaire	7
François de Rochechouart†	France	Aéronautique Militaire	7
Noël de Rochefort†	France	Aéronautique Militaire	7
Jean Derode†	France	Aéronautique Militaire	7
James Dewhirst	United Kingdom	Royal Naval Air Service, Royal Air Force	7
Helmut Dilthey†	German Empire	Luftstreitkräfte	7
Roy Dodds	United States	Royal Flying Corps, Royal Air Force, Royal Canadian Air Force	7
Henry Dolan†	United Kingdom	Royal Flying Corps, Royal Air Force	7
John Donaldson	United States	Royal Flying Corps, United States Army Air Service attached to the Royal Air Force	7
Thomas A. Doran	United Kingdom	Royal Flying Corps, Royal Air Force	7
René Doumer†	France	Aéronautique Militaire	7
Arthur Draisey	United Kingdom	Royal Flying Corps, Royal Air Force	7
Herbert Drewitt	New Zealand	Royal Flying Corps, Royal Air Force	7
Pierre Ducornet	France	Aéronautique Militaire	7
Raoul Echard	France	Aéronautique Militaire	7
Cedric Edwards†	United Kingdom	Royal Naval Air Service, Royal Air Force	7
Leopoldo Eleuteri	Italy	Corpo Aeronautico Militare	7
Herbert Ellis	United Kingdom	Royal Flying Corps, Royal Air Force	7
Conway Farrell	Canada	Royal Flying Corps, Royal Air Force	7
Julius Fichter†	German Empire	Luftstreitkräfte	7
George Buchanan Foster	Canada	Royal Flying Corps, Royal Air Force	7
Gordon Fox-Rule	United Kingdom	Royal Flying Corps, Royal Air Force	7
Adrian Franklyn	United Kingdom	Royal Flying Corps, Royal Air Force	7
Maurice Freehill	United Kingdom	Royal Flying Corps, Royal Air Force	7
Josef Friedrich	Austria-Hungary	Luftfahrtruppen	7
Mario Fucini	Italy	Corpo Aeronautico Militare	7
John Gamon	United Kingdom	Royal Naval Air Service, Royal Air Force	7
Hermann Gilly	German Empire	Luftstreitkräfte	7
Eric Gilroy	Canada	Royal Flying Corps, Royal Air Force	7
Hans Goerth	German Empire	Luftstreitkräfte	7
Walter Grant	Australia	Australian Flying Corps, Royal Air Force	7
William Edrington Gray	United Kingdom	Royal Naval Air Service, Royal Air Force	7
Wilfred Green	United Kingdom	Royal Flying Corps, Royal Air Force	7
John Griffith	United States	Royal Flying Corps, Royal Air Force, United States Army Air Force, United States Air Force	7
Gisbert-Wilhelm Groos	German Empire	Luftstreitkräfte	77
Hermann Habich	German Empire	Luftstreitkräfte	7
Frank Hale	United States	Royal Flying Corps, Royal Air Force	7
Frederick Hall†	United Kingdom	Royal Naval Air Service, Royal Air Force	7
Herbert Hamilton†	United Kingdom	Royal Flying Corps, Royal Air Force	7
Herbert Hartley†	United Kingdom	Royal Flying Corps	7
Otto Hartmann†	German Empire	Luftstreitkräfte	7
Harold Hartney	United States	Royal Flying Corps, United States Army Air Service	7
Ludwig Hautzmayer	Austria-Hungary	Luftfahrtruppen	7
Lanoe Hawker†	United Kingdom	Royal Flying Corps	7
Ian Henderson†	United Kingdom	Royal Flying Corps, Royal Air Force	7
Georg Ritter von Hengl	German Empire	Luftstreitkräfte	7
William Carrall Hilborn†	Canada	Royal Flying Corps, Royal Air Force	7
Charles Hill	United Kingdom	Royal Flying Corps, Royal Air Force	7
Richard Frank Hill†	United Kingdom	Royal Flying Corps, Royal Air Force	7
John Hills	United Kingdom	Royal Flying Corps, Royal Air Force	7
Edward Hoare	United Kingdom	Royal Naval Air Service, Royal Air Force	7
Percy Hobson	United Kingdom	Royal Flying Corps, Royal Air Force	7
Josef Hohly	German Empire	Luftstreitkräfte	7
Lansing Holden	United States	Aéronautique Militaire, United States Army Air Service	7
Jeffrey Batters Home-Hay	Canada	Royal Flying Corps, Royal Air Force	7
Norman William Hustings	United Kingdom	Royal Flying Corps, Royal Air Force	7
Kurt Jacob	German Empire	Luftstreitkräfte	7
Fernand Jacquet	Belgium	Aviation Militaire Belge	7
Otto Jäger†	Austria-Hungary	Luftfahrtruppen	7
Arthur Jarvis	Canada	Royal Flying Corps, Royal Air Force	7
Louis Jarvis	United Kingdom	Royal Flying Corps, Royal Air Force	7
Archie Nathaniel Jenks	Canada	Royal Flying Corps, Royal Air Force	7
Karl Jentsch	German Empire	Luftstreitkräfte	7
Alan Jerrard	United Kingdom	Royal Flying Corps, Royal Air Force	7
Martin Johns	German Empire	Luftstreitkräfte	7
Albert Leslie Jones	United Kingdom	Royal Naval Air Service, Royal Air Force	7
George Jones	Australia	Australian Flying Corps, Royal Australian Air Force	7
Hubert Jones	United Kingdom	Royal Flying Corps, Royal Air Force	7
Harold Joslyn†	Canada	Royal Flying Corps	7
Christian Kairies†	German Empire	Luftstreitkräfte	7
Edward Patrick Kenney	Australia	Australian Flying Corps	7
Walter Kirk	Australia	Australian Flying Corps, Royal Australian Air Force	7
Frederick John Knowles	United Kingdom	Royal Flying Corps, Royal Air Force	7
Emil Koch	German Empire	Luftstreitkräfte	7
Hans Körner	German Empire	Luftstreitkräfte	7
Yevgraph Kruten†	Russia	Imperial Army Air Service	7
Wilhelm Kühne†	German Empire	Luftstreitkräfte	7
Hans Kummetz†	German Empire	Luftstreitkräfte	7
Henri Languedoc†	France	Aéronautique Militaire	7
DeFreest Larner	United States	Aéronautique Militaire, United States Army Air Service, New York National Guard, United States Army Air Corps	7
Maurice Le Blanc-Smith	United Kingdom	Royal Flying Corps, Royal Air Force	7
Marie Lecog De Kerland	France	Aéronautique Militaire	7
Arthur Lee	United Kingdom	Royal Flying Corps, Royal Air Force	7
Alfred Alexander Leitch	Canada	Royal Flying Corps, Royal Air Force, Royal Canadian Air Force	7
Thomas Le Mesurier†	United Kingdom	Royal Naval Air Service, Royal Air Force	7
Herman Leptien	German Empire	Luftstreitkräfte	7
Jean Loste	France	Aéronautique Militaire	7
Albert Lux	German Empire	Luftstreitkräfte	7
Hector MacDonald	Union of South Africa	Royal Flying Corps, Royal Air Force, South African Air Force	7
Peter MacDougall	United Kingdom	Royal Flying Corps, Royal Air Force	7
Norman MacGregor	United Kingdom	Royal Naval Air Service, Royal Air Force	7
John MacKereth	United Kingdom	Royal Flying Corps, Royal Air Force	7
William MacLanachan	United Kingdom	Royal Flying Corps, Royal Air Force	7
Malcolm Plaw MacLeod	Canada	Royal Flying Corps, Royal Air Force, Royal Canadian Air Force	7
Henry Maddocks	United Kingdom	Royal Flying Corps, Royal Air Force	7
Josef von Maier	Austria-Hungary	Luftfahrtruppen	7
Alexandre Marty†	France	Aéronautique Militaire	7
Roy Kirkwood McConnell	Canada	Royal Flying Corps, Royal Air Force	7
Paul McGinness	Australia	Australian Flying Corps, Royal Australian Air Force	7
Karl Mendel†	German Empire	Luftstreitkräfte	7
Xavier Moissinac†	France	Aéronautique Militaire	7
Ernest Stanley Moore	United Kingdom	Royal Flying Corps, Royal Air Force	7
Ernest Morrow	Canada	Royal Flying Corps, Royal Air Force	7
William Nel	Union of South Africa	Royal Flying Corps, Royal Air Force	7
Alfred Niederhoff†	German Empire	Luftstreitkräfte	7
Charles Odell	United Kingdom	Royal Flying Corps, Royal Air Force	7
Augustus Orlebar	United Kingdom	Royal Flying Corps, Royal Air Force	7
Paul von Osterroht†	German Empire	Luftstreitkräfte	7
Hugh Owen	United Kingdom	Royal Flying Corps, Royal Air Force	7
Robert Owen	United Kingdom	Royal Flying Corps, Royal Air Force	7
John Albert Page†	Canada	Royal Naval Air Service	7
Arthur Palliser†	Australia	Australian Flying Corps	7
William Patrick	United Kingdom	Royal Flying Corps, Royal Air Force	7
William Pearson†	United Kingdom	Royal Flying Corps, Royal Air Force	7
Pierre Pendaries	France	Aéronautique Militaire	7
George Peters	Australia	Australian Flying Corps	7
Paul Petit†	France	Aéronautique Militaire	7
Orazio Pierozzi	Italy	Corpo Aeronautico Militare	7
Richard Plange†	German Empire	Luftstreitkräfte	7
Frank Potter†	United Kingdom	Royal Flying Corps	7
Stuart Harvey Pratt	United Kingdom	Royal Flying Corps, Royal Air Force	7
John Carberry Preston	United Kingdom	Royal Flying Corps, Royal Air Force	7
Stephen Price	United Kingdom	Royal Flying Corps, Royal Air Force	7
William Price	United Kingdom	Royal Flying Corps, Royal Air Force	7
Johann Pütz	German Empire	Luftstreitkräfte	7
Stanley Puffer	Canada	Royal Flying Corps, Royal Air Force, Royal Canadian Air Force	7
Josef Raesch	German Empire	Luftstreitkräfte	7
Lewis Ray	Canada	Royal Flying Corps, Royal Air Force	7
Cosimo Rennella	Italy	Corpo Aeronautico Militare	7
Lancelot Richardson†	Australia	Royal Flying Corps	7
Antonio Riva	Italy	Corpo Aeronautico Militare	7
James Robb	United Kingdom	Royal Flying Corps, Royal Air Force	7
Wendel Robertson	United States	United States Army Air Service	7
Charles Robinson	United Kingdom	Royal Naval Air Service, Royal Air Force	7
Jean C. Romatet	France	Aéronautique Militaire	7
Leslie Rummell	United States	United States Army Air Service	7
Howard Saint	United Kingdom	Royal Naval Air Service	7
Paul Santelli	France	Aéronautique Militaire	7
Douglas Savage	United Kingdom	Royal Flying Corps, Royal Air Force	7
Victor Sayaret	France	Aéronautique Militaire	7
Harry Scandrett	United Kingdom	Royal Flying Corps, Royal Air Force	7
Gustav Schneidewind	German Empire	Luftstreitkräfte	7
Karl Schoen†	United States	United States Army Air Service	7
Marat Schumm	German Empire	Luftstreitkräfte	7
Kenneth Gordon Seth-Smith	United Kingdom	Royal Flying Corps, Royal Air Force	7
Sumner Sewall	United States	United States Army Air Service	7
Leonard Slatter	Union of South Africa	Royal Naval Air Service, Royal Air Force	7
Emerson Smith	Canada	Royal Flying Corps, Royal Air Force	7
Frederick Stanton	United Kingdom	Royal Flying Corps, Royal Air Force	7
Charles Steele	United Kingdom	Royal Flying Corps, Royal Air Force	7
Charles Owen Stone	Australia	Australian Flying Corps	7
Gilbert Strange†	United Kingdom	Royal Flying Corps, Royal Air Force	7
Georg Strasser	German Empire	Luftstreitkräfte	7
Charles Stubbs	United Kingdom	Royal Flying Corps, Royal Air Force	7
Oliver Sutton	United Kingdom	Royal Naval Air Service, Royal Air Force	7
Arthur Gilbert Vivian Taylor†	United Kingdom	Royal Flying Corps	7
Merrill Samuel Taylor†	Canada	Royal Naval Air Service, Royal Air Force	7
James Tennant	United Kingdom	Royal Flying Corps, Royal Air Force	7
Gabriel Thomas	France	Aéronautique Militaire	7
David Tidmarsh	United Kingdom	Royal Flying Corps, Royal Air Force	7
William Tinsley	United Kingdom	Royal Flying Corps, Royal Air Force	7
Alexander Tranter	United Kingdom	Royal Air Force	7
Karl Treiber	German Empire	Luftstreitkräfte	7
Norman Trescowthick	Australia	Australian Flying Corps	7
Francis Turner	United Kingdom	Royal Flying Corps, Royal Air Force	7
Kurt Ungewitter	German Empire	Luftstreitkräfte	7
Awdry Vaucour†	United Kingdom	Royal Flying Corps, Royal Air Force	7
Marie Vitalis	France	Aéronautique Militaire	7
Joseph Vuillemin	France	Aéronautique Militaire	7
Harold Walkerdine	United Kingdom	Royal Flying Corps, Royal Air Force	7.
Franz Walz	German Empire	Luftstreitkräfte	7
Eugène Weismann	France	Aéronautique Militaire	7
James Wellwood	Australia	Australian Flying Corps	7
Johannes Werner	German Empire	Luftstreitkräfte	7
Harold Albert White	United Kingdom	Royal Flying Corps, Royal Air Force	7
Hugh White	United Kingdom	Royal Flying Corps, Royal Air Force	7
Percy Williams	United Kingdom	Royal Flying Corps, Royal Air Force	7
Percy Wilson	United Kingdom	Royal Flying Corps, Royal Air Force	7
Albert Woodbridge	United Kingdom	Royal Flying Corps, Royal Air Force	7
