= Trescowthick =

Trescowthick is a surname. Notable people with the surname include:

- Donald Trescowthick (1930–2024), Australian businessman
- Norman Trescowthick (1895–1966), Australian flying ace
