= Frank Potter =

Frank Potter may refer to:

- Frank Potter (aviator) (1891–1917), British flying ace
- Frank Potter (politician) (1919–1978), Australian politician
- Frank J. Potter (1871–1948), British architect
