= Harold Walkerdine =

English World War I flying ace

Harold John Walkerdine
- Born: 13 January 1899; Derby, Derbyshire, England
- Died: 18 June 1966 (aged 67); Derby, England
- Military career
- Allegiance: United Kingdom
- Branch: British Army; Royal Air Force
- Service years: 1917–1919; 1941–1945
- Rank: Lieutenant
- Nickname: Jackie
- Unit: No. 56 Squadron RFC/RAF
- Conflicts: World War I • Western Front; World War II
- Awards: Military Cross

Lieutenant Harold John Walkerdine MC (13 January 1899 – 18 June 1966) was a World War I flying ace officially credited with seven aerial victories.

== Early life and background ==
Walkerdine was born in Derby, the son of William Walkerdine and Sarah Ann (née Jerram); he was the youngest of six children. Walkerdine was educated with Messrs. B.O. and C.J. Corbett (Rycote and Shardlow Hall) and at Oundle School.

== World War I service ==
On 7 June 1917 Walkerdine was commissioned from cadet to temporary second lieutenant (on probation) on the General List to serve in the Royal Flying Corps, and was confirmed in his rank and appointed a flying officer on 31 August.

He was assigned to No. 56 Squadron to fly the S.E.5a single-seat fighter. He scored his first aerial victory on 29 November 1917, when he destroyed a German DFW two-seater reconnaissance aircraft over Neuvireuil. He would not score again until 15 March 1918, when he drove an Albatros D.V down out of control north of Bourlon Wood. The next day at noon, he drove another Albatros down out of control. Two days later, on the 18th, he destroyed a pair of Pfalz D.IIIs to become an ace. On 23 March, Walkerdine, Maurice Mealing, Henry John Burden, and three other pilots claimed a shared victory by destroying a German reconnaissance aircraft over Moreuil. Four days later, Walkerdine and fellow ace Louis Jarvis destroyed an Albatros D.V southeast of Bray. Walkerdine was wounded in action on 11 April 1918.

On 23 March 1919, Walkerdine was placed on the RAF's unemployed list, but these orders were subsequently cancelled. He finally relinquished his commission on 16 April 1919, on the grounds of ill health suffered while in military service.

== World War II ==
Walkerdine returned to military service, being commissioned an acting pilot officer on probation in the Training Branch of the Royal Air Force Volunteer Reserve on 4 March 1941. He served until 22 August 1945, when he once again resigned his commission.

== Honours and awards ==
Military Cross
Temporary Second Lieutenant Harold John Walkerdine, General List and Royal Flying Corps.

"For conspicuous gallantry and devotion to duty. Whilst escorting machines of another squadron, who were engaged on low bombing work, he encountered ten hostile scouts, two of which he succeeded in crashing to earth. He has at all times, by his conspicuous skill and gallantry, set an excellent example to his squadron."

== Personal life ==
Walkerdine was married three times. On 7 September 1921, he married Naomi Wise in Bristol; the union produced one son. The second time he married, in 1934 to Bessie I. Rothwell, was without issue. In 1946, he married again, to Mildred Teather; this marriage was also without children.
