= Maurice Mealing =

Maurice Edmund Mealing
- Born: 21 July 1893; High Wycombe, Buckinghamshire, England
- Died: 24 March 1918 (aged 24); Western Front
- Military career
- Allegiance: United Kingdom
- Branch: British Army
- Rank: Second Lieutenant
- Units: Oxford and Bucks Light Infantry; Shropshire Light Infantry; No. 15 Squadron RFC; No. 56 Squadron RFC
- Conflicts: World War I
- Awards: Military Cross

Second Lieutenant Maurice Edmund Mealing MC (21 July 1893 – 24 March 1918) was a World War I flying ace credited with 14 aerial victories.

== Military service ==
Mealing was originally an infantryman, and was serving as a sergeant in the Oxfordshire and Buckinghamshire Light Infantry when commissioned as a temporary second lieutenant (on probation) in the Shropshire Light Infantry on 7 May 1916. He then transferred into the Royal Flying Corps, and was appointed a flying officer (observer) on 15 November 1916, with seniority from 7 August. He was posted to No. 15 Squadron as an observer, remaining with the unit until May 1917.

He then received pilot's training, being appointed temporary lieutenant on 1 September 1917, and was appointed a flying officer on 17 September. Mealing joined No. 56 Squadron on 18 October as a SE.5a pilot. He opened his victory roll on 30 November, destroying an Albatros D.III over Lesdain. On 10 December, he became a balloon buster when he destroyed an observation balloon. He began 1918 with a victory on 25 January, and another on 17 February. Then, in March, while Mealing was on the brink of acedom, the German build up toward their last offensive supplied him with numerous opportunities. Between 8 and 24 March, he accumulated ten more wins, including another balloon busted, a reconnaissance aircraft shared with Captain William Spurrett Fielding-Johnson and another two-seater downed while teamed with Second Lieutenant Harold Walkerdine, Lieutenant Henry John Burden, and three other British pilots. On 24 March, he was seen pursuing a pair of German two-seaters; another report had him standing waving next to his grounded aircraft. He was never seen again. His Military Cross was awarded to him on 13 May 1918.

His name is inscribed on the Arras Flying Services Memorial, Pas-de-Calais, France.

== Award and citation ==
Military Cross
Second Lieutenant (Temporary Captain) Maurice Edmund Mealing, Shropshire Light Infantry and Royal Flying Corps.

"For conspicuous gallantry and devotion to duty in aerial fighting. He destroyed three enemy machines and drove three down out of control. He also drove down an enemy balloon in flames. He always showed a splendid spirit of courage, keenness and determination."
