= François Battesti =

French World War I flying ace

François Marie Noël Battesti
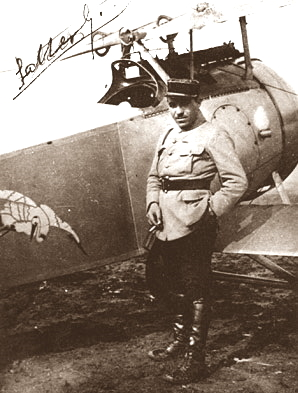
- François Battesti at the Escadrille 73 in 1917
- Born: 5 May 1890; Azzana, France
- Died: 24 August 1977 (aged 87); Azzana, France
- Burial place: Azzana, France
- Military career
- Allegiance: France
- Branch: French Army; French Air Force
- Service years: 1908–1920; 1939–1940
- Rank: Lieutenant
- Units: 106e Régiment d'Infanterie; 24e Régiment d'Infanterie; Escadrille 18; Escadrille 3; Escadrille 10; Escadrille 73
- Commands: Escadrille 95
- Conflicts: World War I • Western Front; World War II
- Awards: Légion d'honneur Médaille militaire Croix de guerre with eight palms

Lieutenant François Marie Noel Battesti (5 May 1890 – 24 August 1977) was a French World War I flying ace credited with seven aerial victories.

== Early life and background ==
Battesti was born Azzana, Corsica, the son of Nicolas and Antoinette Battesti. On 14 October 1908 he enlisted into the Army for a period of five years, and was assigned to the 106e Régiment d'Infanterie as a soldat de 2e classe. He was promoted to caporal on 28 September 1909, and to sergent on 26 September 1910. At the end of five years, he extended his enlistment for a year, transferring to the 24e Régiment d'Infanterie on 14 October 1913.

On 1 January 1914, he transferred to the Army's military aviation branch, joining 1er Groupe d'aviation as a student pilot, and received Brevet militaire No. 453 from the military flying school at Avord on 3 April 1914. On 8 April he was posted to Escadrille 18, and later in the year transferred to Escadrille 3, flying Blériot aircraft in both.

== World War I ==
Soon after the outbreak of the war in August 1914, Battesti returned to Avord and then to Buc to complete his flying training, and was at the military flying school at Pau from 25 January 1915.

On 20 March 1915 he was posted to Escadrille 10 flying Caudron G.3 and Caudron G.4 reconnaissance aircraft. He was promoted to adjudant on 9 May, and was awarded the Médaille militaire on 2 December 1915.

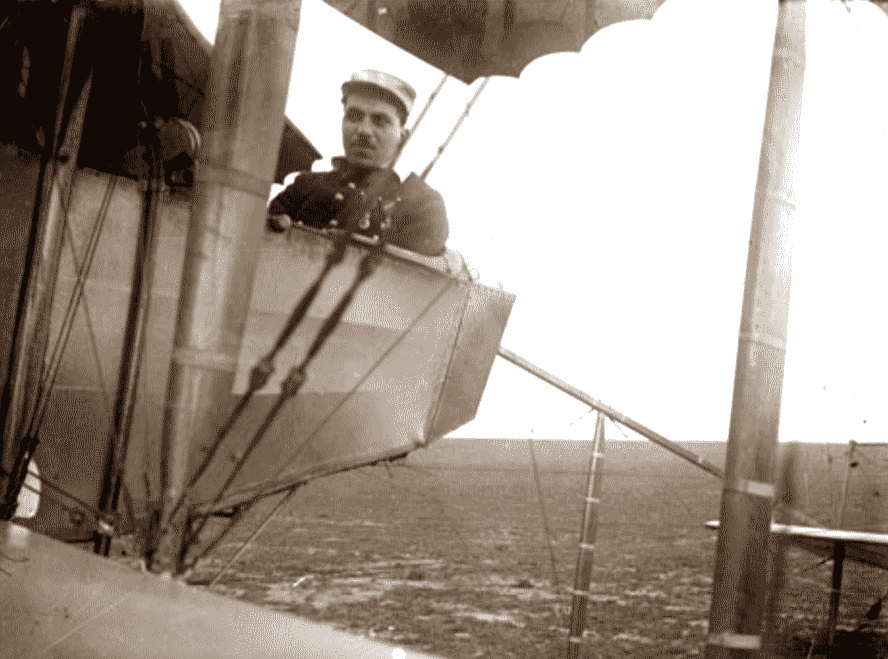
Battesti with his Caudron G.3 at the Escadrille 10 in 1915

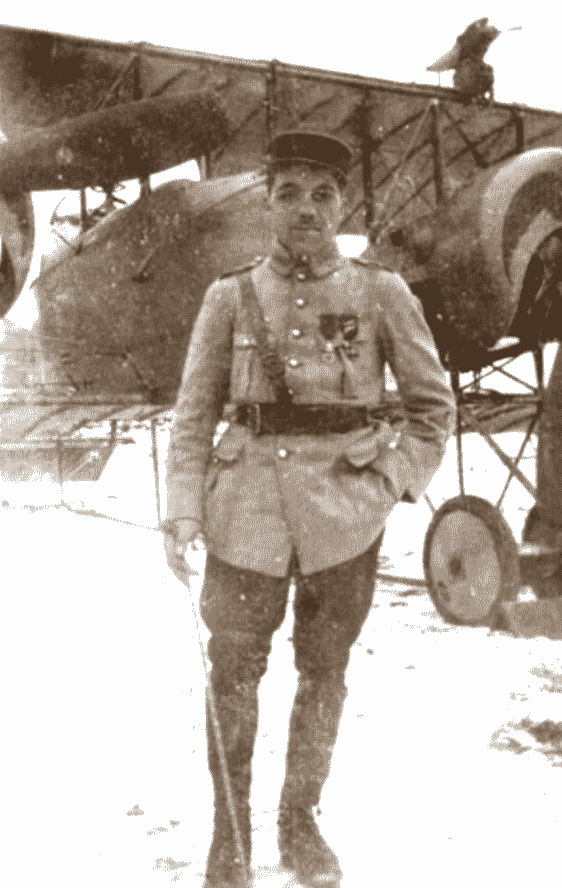
With his Caudron G.4 at the Escadrille 10 in 1916

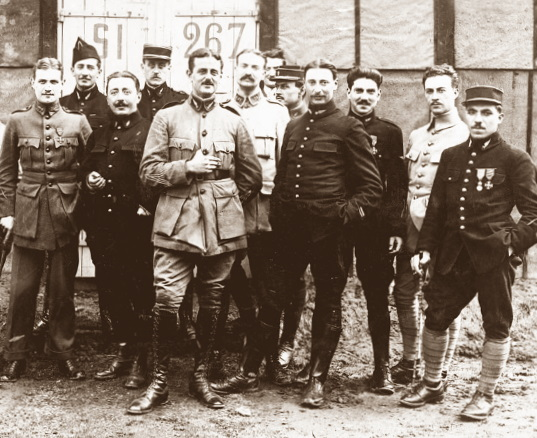
Battesti (right) and his Escadrille 10 in 1916

Battesti was wounded three times in 1916, and was sent to hospital to recover after the third injury on 6 July 1916, receiving promotion to sous-lieutenant on 27 July. He returned to Escadrille 10 on 10 August 1916, serving until 1 February 1917.

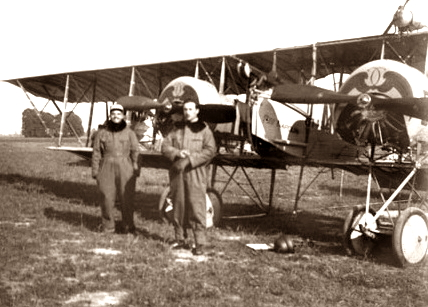
François Battesti's Caudron G.4 at the Escadrille C 10 in 1916

At his own request Battesti was transferred from reconnaissance to a fighter unit, joining Escadrille 73 in 12 March 1917 to fly Nieuport, and later SPAD single-seater fighters, as part of Groupe de Combat 12 'Cigognes'.

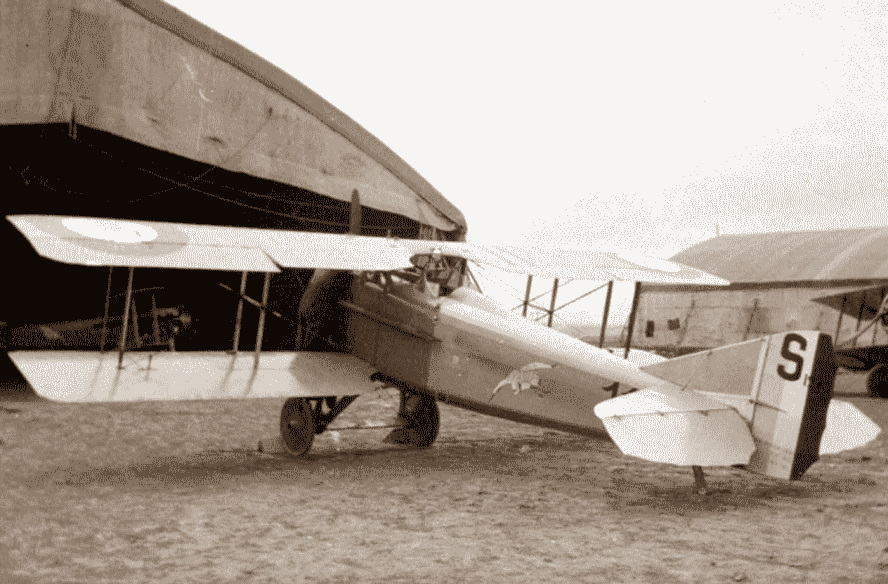
François Battesti's SPAD VII at the Escadrille 73 in 1917

He gained his first aerial victory on 24 April 1917, destroying an enemy aircraft over Sainte-Croix, and his second on 4 July over Berry-au-Bac. Battesti was promoted to lieutenant on 6 July. In 1917, he carried out numerous fighting missions with Georges Guynemer.

Further victories followed on 12 November 1917, then on 22 May and 12 June 1918. On 16 July he shared a victory with Sous-lieutenant Claude Fontaine, and on 29 October 1918 having shot down a Fokker D.VII north of Château-Porcien, he was attacked by six other D.VIIs, and was forced to land south of Taizy with his lower wing shredded by bullets. This was Battesti's seventh, and the 29th and final victory of Escadrille 73 before the armistice of 11 November.

Battesti ended the war credited with seven aerial victories, having won the Médaille militaire, and was awarded the Croix de guerre with eight palms, and was made a Chevalier of the Légion d'honneur.

=== Award citations ===
Médaille militaire
"Très bon pilote rempli d'endurance, l'esprit et le zèle. Il a exécuté de nombreux reconnaissances sous sous le tir ennemi de l'artillerie; a accompli ses obligations avec compétence et humour très noble gagné lors d'un accident dans un plan dans les premiers jours de la guerre qui l'a laissé paralysé.
["A very good pilot filled with endurance, spirit and zeal. He has executed numerous reconnaissances under enemy artillery fire; has accomplished his obligations with skill and noble humor earned during an accident in an aircraft in the early days of the war that left him crippled."]

Chevalier de la légion d'honneur
"Magnifique officier d'audace et d'initiative. Il se distingue en tant que pilote d'un corps d'armée, l'exécution sur les lignes allemandes, de nombreux repérages d'armes à longue portée et de missions à basse altitude malgré la présence d'avions ennemis. Transféré à la chasse à sa demande. A eu durs combats quotidiens et a donné la preuve de l'esprit offensif le plus élevé. A battu plusieurs avions ennemis qui se sont écrasés dans leurs lignes, en particulier le 4 Juillet et 12 Novembre 1917, trois blessures, trois citations.
["A magnificent officer of audacity and initiative. He distinguished himself as a pilot for an Army Corps, executing over the German lines, numerous spottings of long range guns and missions at low altitude despite the presence of enemy aircraft. Transferred to fighter aviation at his own request. He has had daily hard combats and has given proof of the highest offensive spirit. Has downed several enemy aircraft which have crashed in their lines, especially on 4 July and 12 November 1917. Three wounds, three citations."]

== Post-war career ==
Battesti remained with Escadrille 73 until the end of December 1919, attached to l'escadre de combat No. 1 from 10 January to 1 October 1919. He was seconded to the staff from 1 October 1919, and served as commandant of Escadrille 95 from 1 January 1920.

In 1939 Battesti returned to serve in the Armée de l'air during the Second World War.

He died on 24 August 1977, and is buried in the cemetery of Azzana, Corsica.
