= Frank Alberry =

Australian First World War flying ace

- Born: 29 September 1892; Hobart, Tasmania
- Died: 23 January 1968 (aged 75); Sydney, New South Wales
- Military career
- Allegiance: United Kingdom; Australia
- Branch: British Army; Australian Imperial Force; Australian Flying Corps; Royal Australian Air Force Reserve
- Service years: 1914–1925; 1939–1942
- Rank: Lieutenant
- Units: Welch Regiment; 8th Battalion, AIF; No. 2 Squadron AFC
- Conflicts: First World War; Gallipoli Campaign; Western Front; Second World War
- Awards: Distinguished Conduct Medal

Frank Alberry, DCM (29 September 1892 – 23 January 1968) was an Australian soldier and airman who had a varied military career. Born in Hobart, he served in the Welch Regiment of the British Army before the First World War, but deserted. He joined up again in the early days of the First World War, and went on to serve with the 8th Battalion of the Australian Imperial Force.

After service at Gallipoli, he joined the British Expeditionary Force in France. He won a Distinguished Conduct Medal at the Battle of Pozières, but lost a lower leg in the process. Alberry took the extraordinary step of personally petitioning King George V for permission to transfer to the Flying Corps, and subsequently became a flying ace credited with seven aerial victories. Alberry returned to service during the Second World War as a recruiter.

== Early life ==
Frank Alberry was born on 29 September 1892 in Hobart, Tasmania, the son of G. F. Alberry. The younger Alberry grew up in Port Arthur. He worked his passage to England as a ship's engineer steward when a youth and enlisted in the British Army's Welch Regiment. After a year and a half's service, he deserted to return to Australia.

== First World War ==
=== Infantry service ===
On 24 August 1914, having received a pardon for his prior desertion. Alberry then joined the Australian Imperial Force's 8th Battalion as an infantryman, at Broadmeadows, Victoria. On 19 October 1914, he embarked on a ship to sail from Australia to Egypt, and from there, on 5 April 1915, he took ship for the Dardanelles. He landed at Anzac Cove and served in the Gallipoli Campaign. After being evacuated from Gallipoli, he was promoted to lance corporal on 27 December 1915 at Lemnos. He arrived in Alexandria, Egypt, on 7 January 1916 aboard the Empress of Britain.

On 20 February 1916, Alberry was posted to the Machine Gun School at Ismailia, where he was promoted to corporal on the 26th. He gained a distinguished pass with the Lewis Gun at the Machine Gun School, and on 15 March was promoted to sergeant in the Lewis Gun Section. On 26 March, his battalion was sent to join the British Expeditionary Force on the Western Front in France, disembarking at Marseille on 31 March. On 25 July, he was commanding a section of four Lewis guns in the Battle of Pozières. When the 8th Battalion's Company C was held up in its attack by the Germans, Alberry led his gunners in a flanking movement that dislodged the defenders. Following that, he took a Lewis gun forward into a shell crater to provide covering fire while the battalion dug in. The next night, Sergeant Alberry again flanked the Germans with a machine gun while his battalion set up a strongpoint. Alberry then took over the stronghold and held it under fire for two days. He was being relieved from this post on 27 July when a bullet hit his right kneecap. His gallantry in action earned him the Distinguished Conduct Medal, which was gazetted on 20 October 1916.

On 7 August 1916, Albery was evacuated to England aboard the hospital ship Asturias from Le Havre, and admitted to the 1st Southern General Hospital in Stirchley, Birmingham where his right leg was amputated above the knee. He remained in hospital until 26 March 1917, when he was discharged.

=== Flying service ===
When healed, Alberry still wished to serve, so he resorted to the unusual step of gaining a personal audience with King George V to request a transfer to the Australian Flying Corps. The king assented, and on 3 August 1917 Alberry began pilot training at the No. 1 School of Aeronautics in Reading. He was posted to No. 29 (Training) Squadron RFC at RAF Shawbury as a cadet on 13 September. Having successfully completed training despite his lack of a leg, he was appointed a flying officer on 6 November, with a commission as a second lieutenant in the AIF.

He returned to France on 4 April 1918, and was posted to No. 2 Aeroplane Supply Depot. On 16 June, he was posted to No. 2 Squadron AFC to fly the S.E.5a single-seat fighter. On 14 August he was again wounded in action, spending four days at No. 18 Casualty Clearing Station suffering from a concussion. Alberry returned to his squadron, where between 16 September and 4 November he accounted for seven German first-line fighters – two Fokker Dr.Is and five Fokker D.VIIs.

=== List of aerial victories ===
Combat record
No.	Date/Time	Aircraft/ Serial No.	Opponent	Result	Location
1	16 September 1918 @ 0730	S.E.5a (D6995)	Fokker D.VII	Destroyed	North-west of Lille
2	17 September 1918 @ 1020	S.E.5a (D6995)	Fokker Dr.I	Out of control	Lille
3	17 September 1918 @ 1020	S.E.5a (D6995)	Fokker Dr.I	Out of control	Lille
4	18 October 1918 @ 1230	S.E.5a (D6995)	Fokker D.VII	Out of control	North of Tournai
5	28 October 1918 @ 1120	S.E.5a (D6995)	Fokker D.VII	Out of control	Bandour
6	28 October 1918 @ 1120	S.E.5a (D6995)	Fokker D.VII	Destroyed	Bandour
7	4 November 1918 @ 1310	S.E.5a (D6995)	Fokker D.VII	Out of control	Houtaing

== Post-war career ==
Alberry returned to Australia, leaving England on 20 November 1918. Once home, he was discharged at Melbourne on 6 March 1919. However he remained a member of the Reserve of Officers, gaining promotion to lieutenant on 1 October 1920, and eventually transferring to the retired list on 1 October 1925. He subsequently involved himself in the lumber business.

In September 1939, on the outbreak of the Second World War, Alberry applied to join the Royal Australian Air Force Reserve, and served as a recruiting officer from 11 October 1939 to 30 June 1942.

Alberry died at the Concord Repatriation General Hospital in Sydney on 23 January 1968.
