= Douglas Savage =

British flying ace (1892–1967)

- Born: 1892; Oxford, England
- Died: 1967 (aged 74–75); Oxford, England
- Military career
- Allegiance: United Kingdom
- Branch: British Army; Royal Air Force
- Service years: 1915–1919; 1940–1945
- Rank: Flight lieutenant
- Units: Royal Warwickshire Regiment; No. 82 Squadron RFC; No. 62 Squadron RFC/RAF
- Conflicts: First World War: Western Front; Second World War
- Awards: Military Cross; Air Force Cross

Douglas Alfred Savage, MC, AFC (1892–1967) was a British flying ace of the First World War, credited with seven aerial victories.

== First World War ==
Savage was born in Oxford, where his father Alfred Savage, was a stationer, bookseller and publisher. He was commissioned as a second lieutenant in the infantry on 19 March 1915, and first served in a Reserve Battalion of the Royal Warwickshire Regiment, before being transferred to a Service Battalion of his regiment for active service in France. He was transferred to the General List on 23 April 1916 to serve in a trench mortar battalion, where he was briefly appointed an acting-captain between 28 July and 15 August 1916, and then served as acting-lieutenant, until leaving the trench mortar battalion on 4 September 1916. He returned to the Royal Warwickshires, and was promoted to lieutenant on 1 July 1917.

Savage transferred to the Royal Flying Corps, and after completing flight training, was appointed a flying officer on 19 September 1917. He spent two months based at Turnberry serving in No. 82 Squadron, before being posted to No. 62 Squadron to fly the Bristol F.2 two-seater fighter. He travelled with No. 62 Squadron to France at the end of January 1918, taking part in patrols, bomber escort, and ground attack missions during the enemy offensive around St. Quentin in the second half of March, being credited with an enemy aircraft driven down out of control on the 26th. However his squadron suffered heavy casualties, losing 24 aircrew killed, wounded or taken prisoner by the end of the month.

On 1 April 1918, the Royal Flying Corps was merged with the Royal Naval Air Service to form the Royal Air Force. Savage's unit became No. 62 Squadron RAF. They were heavily engaged during the Battle of the Lys for the last three weeks of that month, with pilots averaging 6 to 7 hours flying time each day, but recorded several successes. Savage was credited with two enemy aircraft driven down on 12 April, and two more destroyed in quick succession on the 21st, but was injured when shot down by anti-aircraft fire near Armentières the same day. He gained his sixth victory on 19 May, but his aircraft was badly damaged by enemy fire and he was forced to land. His seventh and final victory came on 2 June. He was then posted back to the Home Establishment in England.

His award of the Military Cross was gazetted on 23 July 1918. His citation read:

Lieutenant Douglas Alfred Savage, General List and Royal Air Force. For conspicuous gallantry and devotion to duty, especially on the following occasions. When on patrol attacked a formation of enemy aeroplanes, crashing one, while another fell to pieces in the air after a short combat. Attacked an Albatross, which he set on fire, and drove another down out of control. Attacked many ground targets from low altitudes.

Savage was appointed a flight commander with the acting rank of captain on 2 October 1918. He was transferred to the RAF's unemployed list on 15 June 1919.

=== List of aerial victories ===
Combat record
No.	Date/Time	Aircraft/ Serial No.	Opponent	Result	Location	Notes
1	26 March 1918	Bristol F.2 Fighter	Enemy aircraft	Out of control		Observer: Second Lieutenant Louis Thompson
2	12 April 1918 @ 1420	Bristol F.2 Fighter (B1234)	Pfalz D.III	Out of control	East of Estaires	Observer: Second Lieutenant Louis Thompson
3	12 April 1918 @ 1515	Bristol F.2 Fighter (B1234)	Albatros D.V	Out of control	Aubers	Observer: Second Lieutenant Louis Thompson
4	21 April 1918 @ 0945-0950	Bristol F.2 Fighter (B1234)	Albatros D.V	Destroyed	West of Lille	Observer: Second Lieutenant Louis Thompson
5	21 April 1918 @ 0945-0950	Bristol F.2 Fighter (B1234)	Pfalz D.III	Destroyed	West of Lille	Observer: Second Lieutenant Louis Thompson
6	19 May 1918 @ 1030	Bristol F.2 Fighter (B1336)	Albatros D.V	Out of control	Bray	Observer: Lieutenant E. W. Collis
7	2 June 1918 @ 1945	Bristol F.2 Fighter (C953)	Fokker Dr.I	Out of control	South of Pozières	Observer: Sergeant William Norman Holmes

== Second World War ==
Savage returned to military service on 25 April 1940, being commissioned as a pilot officer (on probation) in the Administrative and Special Duties Branch of the Royal Air Force Volunteer Reserve. He was transferred to the General Duties Branch on 14 October 1940. Savage's probationary period ended on 14 October 1941, and he was promoted to flying officer (war substantive) the same day. He was promoted again, to flight lieutenant, during 1942, as he was appointed an acting squadron leader from that rank on 14 October. Savage was awarded the Air Force Cross in the 1945 New Year Honours.
