= Percy Wilson (RAF officer) =

British World War I flying ace

- Born: 11 April 1895; Edge Hill, Liverpool, England
- Died: Unknown
- Military career
- Allegiance: United Kingdom
- Branch: British Army; Royal Air Force
- Service years: 1917–1919; 1921–1922
- Rank: Captain
- Unit: No. 28 Squadron RFC/RAF
- Conflicts: World War I • Italian Front
- Awards: Military Cross; Bronze Medal for Military Valour (Italy)

Captain Percy Wilson MC (born 11 April 1895, date of death unknown) was a British World War I flying ace credited with seven aerial victories.

== Military service ==
Wilson was commissioned from cadet to temporary second lieutenant (on probation) on the General List for service in the Royal Flying Corps on 17 May 1917. He was confirmed in his rank and appointed a flying officer on 29 June.

He was posted to No. 28 Squadron RFC to fly the Sopwith Camel single-seat fighter on the Italian Front. Operating over the province of Treviso he gained his first aerial victory on 25 January 1918, destroying an enemy reconnaissance aircraft over San Fior di Sopra. On 4 February he destroyed an Albatros D.V fighter near Motta, and another reconnaissance aircraft over Nervesa on 27 February, being appointed a flight commander with the temporary rank of captain the same day. He was promoted to lieutenant on 26 March 1918. On 1 April 1918, the Army's Royal Flying Corps was merged with the Royal Naval Air Service to form the Royal Air Force, and his unit became No. 28 Squadron RAF. Between 3 and 19 May Wilson accounted for three more D.V fighters and an observation balloon.

Wilson was awarded the Military Cross on 16 September 1918. His citation read:

Lieutenant (Temporary Captain) Percy Wilson, RAF.

"For conspicuous gallantry and devotion to duty in destroying six enemy aeroplanes and driving down three more out of control. He also destroyed an enemy balloon, which fell in flames."

On 1 November 1918 he was awarded the Bronze Medal for Military Valour by Italy.

=== List of aerial victories ===
Combat record
| No. | Date/Time | Aircraft/ Serial No. | Opponent | Result | Location |
|---|---|---|---|---|---|
| 1 | 25 January 1918 @ 1145 | Sopwith Camel (B6363) | C | Destroyed | San Fior di Sopra |
| 2 | 4 February 1918 @ 1005 | Sopwith Camel (B6363) | Albatros D.V | Destroyed | 1 km (0.62 mi) south of Motta |
| 3 | 27 February 1918 @ 1030 | Sopwith Camel (B5183) | C | Destroyed | Nervesa |
| 4 | 3 May 1918 @ 0915 | Sopwith Camel (B5187) | Albatros D.V | Destroyed | Monte Santo |
| 5 | 10 May 1918 @ 1425 | Sopwith Camel (B6363) | Balloon | Destroyed | Mareno |
| 6 | 11 May 1918 @ 1000 | Sopwith Camel (B6363) | Albatros D.V | Destroyed in flames | Follina |
| 7 | 19 May 1918 @ 0715 | Sopwith Camel (B6363) | Albatros D.V | Destroyed in flames | Arsiè |

== Post-war career ==
Following the end of the war, as the RAF was reduced in size, Wilson relinquished his acting rank of captain on 25 March 1919, and was transferred to the RAF's unemployed list on 1 September 1919.

Wilson was briefly restored to the active list with the rank of flying officer for temporary duty between 9 April and 5 June 1921. He was then granted a short service commission in the RAF with the same rank on 18 July 1921, but was forced to relinquish it on account of ill-health on 25 October 1922.
