= Harry Scandrett =

British ace

- Born: 23 July 1892; Kew, Surrey, England
- Died: September 1977 (aged 84–85); York, North Yorkshire, England
- Burial place: York Cemetery, York, North Yorkshire, England
- Spouse: Marjorie Ella Williams (1889-1944)
- Military career
- Allegiance: United Kingdom
- Branch: British Army; Royal Air Force
- Rank: Lieutenant
- Units: Norfolk Regiment; No. 25 Squadron RFC; No. 11 Squadron RFC
- Conflicts: World War I • Western Front

Lieutenant Harry Scandrett (1892–1977) was a British ace credited with seven aerial victories during the First World War.

== Early life ==
Scandrett was born at Kew in South West London, England, in September 1892. At the outbreak of World War I he was living in Strawberry Hill, London.

== Military career ==
After being commissioned as a second lieutenant in the Norfolk Regiment, Scandrett was transferred to the General List when appointed a flying officer (observer) in the RFC on 28 October 1916. He was posted to No. 25 Squadron in France, as observer/gunner in a Royal Aircraft Factory F.E.2, reconnaissance biplane. On 17 November, he scored his only victory with this squadron, and it may be the only occasion that he witnessed the destruction of the enemy aircraft.

Scandrett returned to England for pilot training in early 1917, gaining his flying certificate, and on 27 April he was appointed a flying officer with seniority from 7 August 1916. He then joined No. 11 Squadron as a Bristol F.2 Fighter pilot. Scandrett scored six victories between 7 July and 30 September 1917, being promoted to lieutenant on 16 July. All his victories occurred in the afternoon and all enemy aircraft were Fokker D.Vs. No particular reason is known for Scandrett's withdrawal from action, though it may be that he retired injured.

He was transferred to the RAF's unemployed list on 3 June 1919.

== Post war life ==
After the war, Harry lived for several decades in Durlston Road, Kingston-Upon-Thames. He died in September 1977.

== See also ==
- List of World War I flying aces
