= Edward Hoare (RAF airman) =

British flying ace

- Born: 18 July 1890; Acton Vale, London, England
- Died: 8 October 1973 (aged 83); Rayleigh, Essex, England
- Military career
- Allegiance: United Kingdom
- Branch: Royal Naval Air Service; Royal Air Force
- Rank: Sergeant
- Unit: No. 88 Squadron RAF
- Conflicts: World War I; Western Front; World War II
- Awards: Distinguished Flying Medal

Sergeant Edward Hoare DFM (18 July 1890 – 8 October 1973) was a British First World War flying ace credited with seven aerial victories as an observer/air gunner.

== Early life ==
Hoare was born on 18 July 1890 in Acton Vale, London.

== Military service ==
Hoare joined the Royal Naval Air Service and trained as an air gunner, first serving on the airship N.S.1, but was later posted to No. 88 Squadron RFC. On 1 April 1918 the RNAS became part of the newly formed Royal Air Force. Between June and August 1918 flying as a Bristol F.2b observer/air gunner he was credited, along with his pilots Lieutenants Alec Williamson and C. Foster, with seven victories. He was wounded on 17 August 1918 and shot down and wounded again in October 1918, staying in hospital to the end of the war.

In 1939 Hoare re-enlisted in the RAF, serving as aircrew for a year before being discharged because of his age. He spent the rest of the war serving in the ARP in Forest Gate, East London.

== Honours and awards ==
Serjt. Edward Hoare was awarded the Distinguished Flying Medal on 1 January 1919.

== See also ==
- List of World War I aces credited with 7 victories
