= Francis Turner (RAF officer) =

British WWI flying ace

Francis McDougall Charlewood Turner
- Born: 17 March 1897; Hastings, Sussex, England
- Died: January 1982 (age 94); Chichester, West Sussex, England
- Military career
- Allegiance: United Kingdom
- Branch: British Army; Royal Air Force
- Service years: 1916–1920; 1940–1944
- Rank: Squadron Leader
- Units: No. 55 Squadron RFC; No. 57 Squadron RAF
- Awards: Military Cross; Distinguished Flying Cross
- Other work: Fellow and President of Magdalene College, Cambridge

Squadron Leader Francis McDougall Charlewood Turner, MC, DFC (17 March 1897 – January 1982) was a British First World War flying ace credited with seven aerial victories. He returned to military service during the Second World War, and in between had a distinguished academic career as a Fellow and President of Magdalene College, Cambridge.

== Early life and family background ==
Turner was born in Hastings, Sussex, one of nine children born to Charles Henry Turner, who at that time was rector of the parish of St George-in-the-East and an Honorary Chaplain to the Queen, who served as Suffragan Bishop of Islington from 1898 until 1923, and Edith Emma, the daughter of the Right Reverend Francis McDougall, Bishop of Labuan and Sarawak.

== World War I ==
Turner was commissioned as a second lieutenant (on probation) on 3 January 1916 to serve in the Royal Flying Corps, and after completing his flight training, he was appointed a flying officer and confirmed in his rank on 17 June. He was promoted to lieutenant on 1 March 1917, and on 7 May was appointed a flight commander with the temporary rank of captain.

Turner gained his first aerial victories on 13 August 1917, while serving in No. 55 Squadron, flying an Airco DH.4 two-seater day bomber. With Second Lieutenant R. Brett as his observer, he drove down out of control two Albatros D.V fighters over Roulers.

On 26 September 1917 he was awarded the Military Cross, the citation for which was eventually published on 8 January 1918. It read:

Lieutenant (Temporary Captain) Francis McDougall Charlewood Turner, Royal Flying Corps, Special Reserve.

"For conspicuous gallantry and devotion to duty as leader of long distance bombing raids and on photographic reconnaissances. He has taken part in many successful operations, in twenty-four of which he has acted as leader, and by his skill and determination has invariably done good work in spite of very adverse weather conditions, and though more than once attacked by enemy formations in greatly superior numbers to his own. He was the first officer to carry out a single machine long distance reconnaissance successfully, and has been more than once congratulated for the excellence of his photographic work."

On 1 April 1918, the Army's Royal Flying Corps (RFC) and the Royal Naval Air Service were merged to form the Royal Air Force. Turner, now serving in No. 57 Squadron marked the occasion by shooting down three Fokker Dr.I fighters over Irles, with Second Lieutenant A. Leach as his observer, taking his total to five and making him an ace. On 28 July he shared with the crews of two other aircraft in the driving down of a Fokker D.VII fighter over Vaulx-Vraucourt, with Sergeant S. G. Sowden as his observer, and on 8 August he and observer Second Lieutenant H. S. Musgrove destroyed another D.VII over Moislains Airfield, to bring his total to seven.

Turner was subsequently awarded the Distinguished Flying Cross, which was gazetted on 1 November 1918. His citation read:

Captain Francis McDougal Charlewood Turner, MC.

"While leading a formation of ten machines on a bombing raid this officer was attacked by twenty Fokker biplanes. In face of this strong attack he led his formation down to 1,000 feet, and two sheds were set on fire and billets were riddled with machine-gun fire; three enemy machines were also accounted for, Captain Turner himself crashing one. The success of this raid was mainly due to the brilliant and daring leadership of this officer."

Turner eventually relinquished his RAF commission on 12 March 1920, due to ill-health contracted on active service, and was permitted to retain his rank.

=== List of aerial victories ===
Combat record
No.	Date/Time	Aircraft/ Serial No.	Opponent	Result	Location	Notes
No. 55 Squadron RFC
1	13 August 1917 @ 0815–0820	DH.4 (B3962)	Albatros D.V	Out of control	Roulers	Observer: Second Lieutenant R. Brett.
2	13 August 1917 @ 0815–0820	DH.4 (B3962)	Albatros D.V	Out of control	South-east of Roulers	Observer: Second Lieutenant R. Brett.
No. 57 Squadron RAF
3	1 April 1918 @ 1145	DH.4 (A7901)	Fokker Dr.I	Destroyed in flames	Irles	Observer: Second Lieutenant A. Leach.
4	1 April 1918 @ 1145	DH.4 (A7901)	Fokker Dr.I	Destroyed	Irles	Observer: Second Lieutenant A. Leach.
5	1 April 1918 @ 1145	DH.4 (A7901)	Fokker Dr.I	Out of control	Irles	Observer: Second Lieutenant A. Leach.
6	28 July 1918 @ 1720	DH.4	Fokker D.VII	Out of control	Vaulx-Vraucourt	Observer: Sergeant S. G. Sowden. Shared with Lieutenant W. J. Pitt & Second Lieutenant T. C. Danby and Lieutenant E. M. Coles & Sergeant McDonald.
7	8 August 1918 @ 0815	DH.4 (D8419)	Fokker D.VII	Destroyed	Moislains Airfield	Observer: Second Lieutenant H. S. Musgrove.

== Inter-war career ==
After the war Turner turned to an academic career, graduating from Magdalene College, Cambridge, and winning the La Bas Prize in 1924 for his essay The Element of Irony in English Literature, which was published in 1926, and then becoming a fellow of the college.

== World War II ==
Turner returned to military service during the Second World War, being commissioned as a pilot officer "for the duration of hostilities" in the Administrative and Special Duties Branch of the Royal Air Force Volunteer Reserve on 31 October 1940. He was promoted to the war substantive rank of flying officer on 27 May 1941, and was appointed a temporary squadron leader on 1 July 1944. He resigned his commission on 4 November 1944, retaining the rank of squadron leader.

== Post-war career ==
Turner returned to Magdalene, eventually becoming Pepys Librarian and president of the college. His contemporaries included Dennis Babbage and C. S. Lewis, and he became a close friend of T. S. Eliot.

Turner died in Chichester, West Sussex, in January 1982.
