= David Tidmarsh =

David Mary Tidmarsh
- Born: 28 January 1892; Limerick, Ireland
- Died: 27 November 1944 (aged 52); Dublin, Ireland
- Military career
- Allegiance: United Kingdom
- Branch: British Army; Royal Air Force
- Service years: 1915–1920; 1939–1944
- Rank: Squadron leader
- Units: Royal Irish Regiment; No. 24 Squadron RFC; No. 48 Squadron RFC
- Conflicts: World War I • Western Front; World War II
- Awards: Military Cross

Squadron Leader David Mary Tidmarsh MC (28 January 1892 – 27 November 1944) was an Irish-born flying ace of the Royal Flying Corps during the First World War, credited with seven aerial victories.

== Personal life ==
Tidmarsh was born on Circular Road, Limerick, to David Tidmarsh, a merchant originally from Kilkenny, and Elizabeth (Lillie) Murray, who was from Tipperary. A brother of his, John Moriarty Tidmarsh, of the No. 24 Squadron RFC, was accidentally killed in a flying accident at Doncaster on 3 September 1918.

== World War I ==
Tidmarsh was commissioned as a second lieutenant in the 4th Battalion, Royal Irish Regiment (Special Reserve) on 23 April 1915. He was soon transferred to the Royal Flying Corps, beginning his flight training at Shoreham on 27 August 1915, and received Royal Aero Club Aviator's Certificate No. 1833 after soloing a Maurice Farman biplane at the Military School, Ruislip on 7 October. On 13 January 1916 he was appointed a flying officer in the RFC.

Posted to No. 24 Squadron, he was piloting an Airco DH.2 on 2 April 1916 when he scored his—and his squadron's—first victory, destroying a German Albatros two-seater and killing its crew of Karl Oscar Breibisch-Guthmann and Paul Wein. On 21 April, a dud anti-aircraft shell blew through the nacelle of his plane without harming him. On 25 April, Tidmarsh was flying Airco DH.2 No. 5965, escorting a mission of Royal Aircraft Factory F.E.2s, when he dived on an approaching Fokker Eindekker fighter. It fled. He pursued. The German had a 500-yard lead on Tidmarsh, who was not close enough to fire, when the Fokker lost its wings at an altitude of 1,000 feet. A German report would later blame flying wires severed by bullets for breaking up the aircraft. However, Tidmarsh received credit for the victory, his second. He would score once more while with No. 24 Squadron, when he set a two-seater on fire on 20 May 1916, killing Franz Patzig and Georg Loenholdt.

Tidmarsh was awarded the Military Cross on 31 May 1916. The citation read:

2nd Lt. David Mary Tidmarsh, 4th Bn., R. Ir. R. (Spec. Res.) and R.F.C.

"For conspicuous gallantry and skill when attacking hostile aircraft on several occasions, notably on one occasion when he dived at an enemy machine and drove it down wrecked to the ground."

Tidmarsh then went on leave to England, followed by duties as an instructor there. He was promoted to lieutenant on 1 July 1916, and appointed a flight commander with the temporary rank of captain on 16 August 1916. He returned to combat in March 1917 with No. 48 Squadron, flying the new Bristol F.2 Fighter. In four days fighting, between 8 and 11 April, he was part of various formations that won victories over four more aircraft. On 11 April 1917, after the destruction of two Albatros D.IIIs, Tidmarsh was shot down by Leutnant Kurt Wolff of Jasta 11, and spent the rest of the war as a prisoner of war. He was repatriated to the United Kingdom, arriving at Hull on 30 December 1918. He was placed on the RAF unemployed list on 28 October 1919, and relinquished his army commission on 1 April 1920.

=== List of aerial victories ===
Combat record
No.	Date/Time	Aircraft/ Serial No.	Opponent	Result	Location	Notes
No. 24 Squadron RFC
1	2 April 1916 @ 0655	D.H.2 (5924)	Albatros C	Destroyed	Grandcourt—Albert	Shared with Second Lieutenant S. J. Sibley.
2	30 April 1916 @ 1045	D.H.2 (5965)	Fokker E	Destroyed	Bapaume	
3	20 May 1916 @ 0415	D.H.2 (5965)	C	Destroyed in flames	South of Pozières	Shared with Captain W. A. Summers.
No. 48 Squadron RFC
4	8 April 1917	Bristol F.2a	Albatros D.III	Out of control	Rémy	Observer: Second Lieutenant C. B. Holland. Shared with Second Lieutenants O. W. Berry & F. B. Goodison.
5	10 April 1917	Bristol F.2a (A3338)	Enemy Aircraft	Out of control	Rémy	Observer: Second Lieutenant C. B. Holland. Shared with Second Lieutenants G. N. Brockhurst & C. B. Boughton
6	11 April 1917 @ 0830–0900	Bristol F.2a (A3338)	Albatros D.III	Destroyed	Fampoux	Observer: Second Lieutenant C. B. Holland. Shared with Second Lieutenants G. N. Brockhurst & C. B. Boughton, R. F. Adeney & L. G. Lovell, Alan Riley & L. G. Hall.
7	11 April 1917 @ 0830–0900	Bristol F.2a (A3338)	Albatros D.III	Destroyed	Fampoux	Observer: Second Lieutenant C. B. Holland. Shared with Second Lieutenants G. N. Brockhurst & C. B. Boughton, R. F. Adeney & L. G. Lovell, Alan Riley & L. G. Hall.

== World War II ==
With the outbreak of World War II imminent, he was recommissioned as a flying officer in the Administrative and Special Duties Branch of the Royal Air Force Volunteer Reserve on 31 August 1939. He was promoted to temporary squadron leader on 1 September 1942, and relinquished his commission due to ill-health on 20 January 1944. He died in a Dublin nursing home on 27 November 1944, just 18 days after his brother Gerard, who was serving as a major in the British Army.

== Bibliography ==
- Guttman, Jon & Dempsey, Harry (2009). Pusher Aces of World War I. Oxford, UK: Osprey Publishing. ISBN 978-1-84603-417-6.
