= James Tennant (RFC officer) =

- Born: 27 February 1896; Brydekirk, Dumfriesshire, Scotland
- Died: 1966; South Western Surrey Age 70
- Relatives: Wife: Kathleen Mary Buckton (married in 1928)
- Military career
- Allegiance: United Kingdom
- Branch: British Army
- Rank: Lieutenant
- Unit: No. 20 Squadron RFC
- Awards: Military Cross

Lieutenant James Tennant MC (born 27 February 1896, date of death unknown) was a Scottish World War I flying ace credited with seven aerial victories.

== Military service ==
Tennant worked in a bank in Newton Stewart, Scotland, before the war. In 1917 he was assigned to No. 20 Squadron as a gunner/observer flying the F.E.2d two-seater. He scored his first aerial victory on 9 June 1917, the same day the squadron lost Francis Cubbon and Frederick Thayre. Four days later, on 13 June, Tennant was teamed with fellow ex-bank clerk Harry Luchford; Tennant would score six victories in a row with Luchford, beginning that day and ending on 17 August 1917.
