= Richard Hill (RAF officer) =

British flying ace (1899–1918)

Richard Frank Hill
- Born: 28 April 1899; Redcar, Yorkshire, England
- Died: 17 September 1918 (aged 19)
- Burial place: Holy Trinity Church, High Hurstwood, Buxted, Sussex; 51°01′07″N 0°07′51″E
- Military career
- Allegiance: United Kingdom
- Branch: British Army; Royal Air Force
- Service years: 1917–1918
- Rank: Lieutenant
- Unit: No. 20 Squadron RFC
- Conflicts: World War I; Western Front
- Awards: Military Cross

Lieutenant Richard Frank Hill MC (28 April 1899 – 17 September 1918) was a British World War I flying ace credited with seven aerial victories.

== Biography ==
Hill was born in Redcar, Yorkshire, the son of Frank Hill, and grandson of Richard Hill. He was educated at the Grange School in Crowborough, East Sussex, and at Charterhouse School, Surrey. He left school at Easter 1917, about the time of his 18th birthday, and joined the Royal Flying Corps. From cadet he was commissioned as a temporary second lieutenant (on probation) on 21 June, and on 25 August was appointed a flying officer (observer) and confirmed in his rank, with seniority from 22 July.

Posted to No. 20 Squadron, Hill gained his first victory on 19 August, in a F.E.2d, piloted by Second Lieutenant C. B. Simpson, by driving down 'out of control' an Albatros D.V over Comines. For all his subsequent victories, which were all over D.Vs, he was in a Bristol F.2b piloted by Lieutenant Harry Luchford. They were all gained in a three-week period from 9 September and 1 October.

Hill was awarded the Military Cross on 27 October, which was gazetted on 15 March 1918. His citation read:

Temporary Second Lieutenant Richard Frank Hill, General List and Royal Flying Corps.

"For conspicuous gallantry and devotion to duty. He has carried out a great deal of useful observation work, and has proved himself an excellent fighting observer. On one occasion, when acting as observer on a photographic reconnaissance, he and his pilot shot down and destroyed two enemy scouts. He has also destroyed three other hostile machines."

Hill then returned to England, and on 14 May 1918 his status was changed from Lieutenant (Observer Officer) to Lieutenant (Aeroplane & Seaplanes), signifying that he had qualified as a pilot. However, Hill died on 17 September 1918, after undergoing two operations for appendicitis. He is buried at Holy Trinity Church, High Hurstwood, Buxted, Sussex.

== See also ==
- List of World War I aces credited with 7 victories
