= Thomas Barkell =

Australian World War I flying ace

Thomas Henry Barkell
- Born: 1892; Randwick, New South Wales, Australia
- Died: 1945; Chatswood, New South Wales, Australia
- Military career
- Allegiance: Australia
- Branch: Australian Flying Corps
- Service years: 1916–1919
- Rank: Lieutenant
- Units: No. 3 Squadron AFC; No. 4 Squadron AFC
- Conflicts: World War I; Western Front
- Awards: Distinguished Flying Cross

Lieutenant Thomas Henry Barkell DFC (1892–1945) was an Australian flying ace of the First World War, credited with seven aerial victories.

== Military service ==
=== No. 3 Squadron AFC ===
Barkell worked as a motor mechanic in Sydney before enlisting into the Australian Flying Corps on 16 October 1916. He was posted to "B" Flight, No. 2 Squadron, (later renumbered No. 3 Squadron) as a private, but was regraded as an air mechanic 2nd class when the squadron arrived in England on 29 December aboard HMAT A38 Ulysses. His squadron was based at South Carlton, Lincolnshire, engaged in flying training with Avro 504 and B.E.2e two-seater aircraft. In February 1917 flying duty was opened to the rank and file; six positions for aerial gunners ranked as NCO observers were offered, and over 100 applications (more than half the squadron's other ranks) were received. Six men were eventually selected, of whom Barkell was one. He was promoted to sergeant and posted to the No. 1 School of Aerial Gunnery in Hythe, Kent, for training. In mid-August the squadron finally began to move to France, the first Australian flying squadron to see service on the Western Front, based at Savy, to support the Canadian and XIII Corps front near Arras.

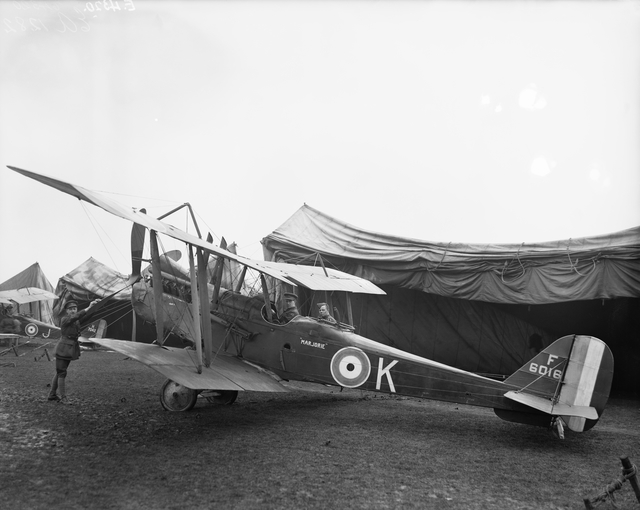
R.E.8 of No. 3 Squadron, AFC

In late September Barkell, began flying reconnaissance patrols in the R.E.8 aircraft with which the squadron was equipped. Poor weather at the beginning of October kept his squadron grounded, but later in the month Barkell was flying again, reporting the positions of enemy artillery. In mid-November the squadron moved to a new base at Bailleul to support the Australian Corps, mainly carrying out photographic reconnaissance, but also offensive patrols. On 14 November Barkell was one of four Observer NCO's graded as Qualified Aerial Gunners. However, around dawn on 24 November he was flying with Lieutenant K. A. Roberts on a reconnaissance mission when their aircraft was hit by anti-aircraft fire. Barkell was shot in the left ankle, and their aircraft overturned on landing. Both men were sent to No. 2 (Australian) Casualty Clearing Station for treatment.

=== No. 4 Squadron AFC ===
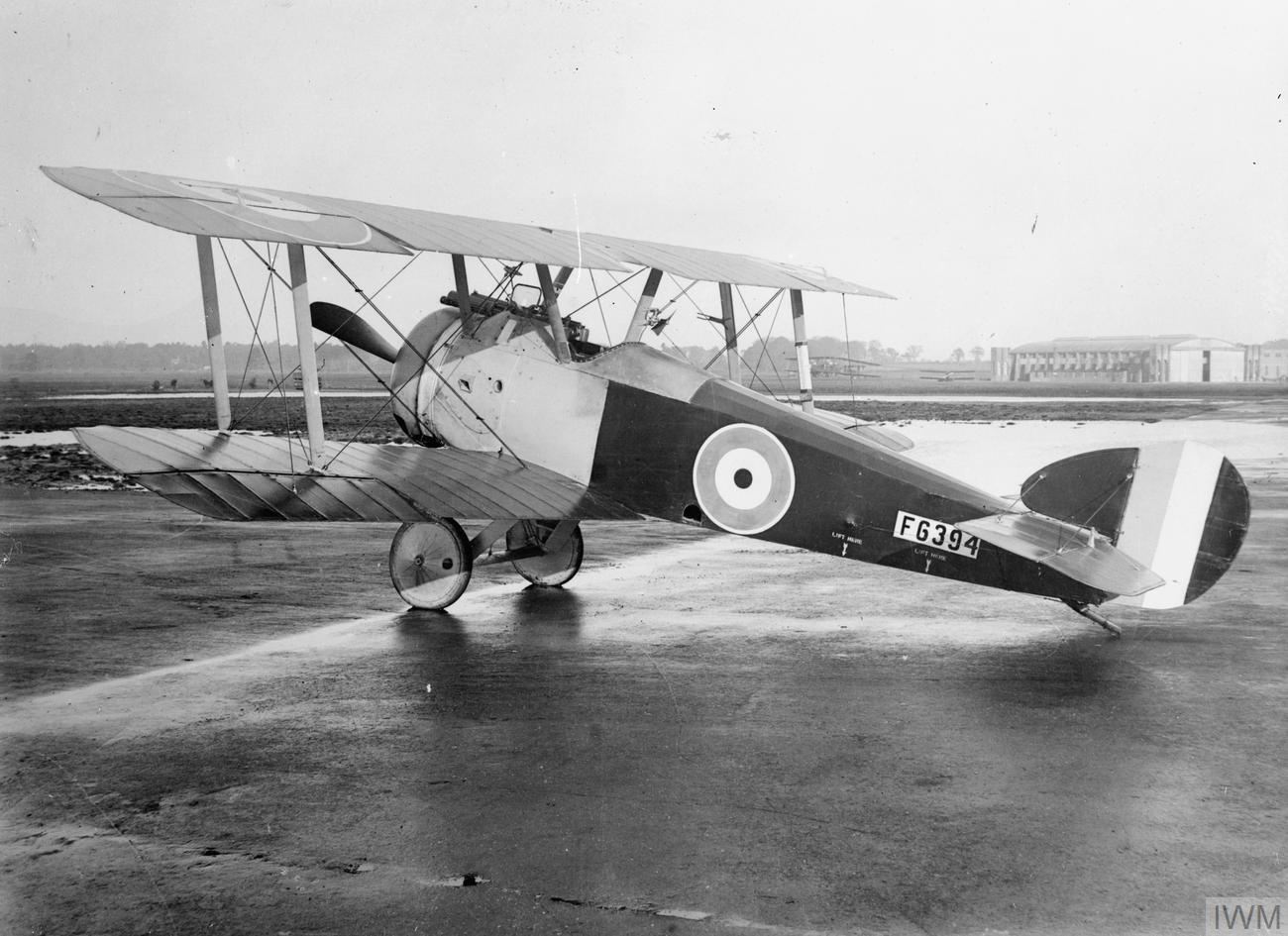
Sopwith Camel

Having recovered from his injuries, Barkell then trained to become a pilot, being posted to the No. 2 School of Military Aeronautics as a cadet on 10 February 1918. He completed his flight training on 19 July and on 22 August, commissioned as a second lieutenant, was posted to "A" Flight, No. 4 Squadron AFC, based at Reclinghem under the command of Major Edgar McCloughry. After several days of practice flights in the Sopwith Camel single-seat fighter, he flew his first operational mission on 26 August, dropping two 25 lb (11 kg) bombs on an enemy ammunition dump at Bac St. Maur. Barkell gained his first aerial victory on 7 September while on patrol over Hénin-Beaumont. On observing an LVG aircraft below him, he manoeuvred to the east, then dived down to attack, followed by two other aircraft from his squadron. All three fired at the LVG from above, then Barkell attacked from below at close range causing the aircraft go into a vertical dive and crash. On 16 September Barkell was leading a patrol over Frelinghien when they were attacked by about twelve enemy aircraft. During the ensuing dogfight Barkell was attacked by three aircraft, but managed to get onto the tail of one, a Fokker D.VII, and after firing from about 50 yards then saw it spin down and crash. On 22 September he was again leading a patrol of three aircraft over Armentières when they were attacked by about fourteen enemy aircraft, this time Barkell shot at another Fokker D.VII, which went down in a flat spin. He was then attacked by two more D.VIIs from behind, but made a tight turn and was able to fire at one from a very close range, causing it to turn over and dive steeply away. Unfortunately his aircraft had also been hit in the engine and he had to make a forced landing at Neuve Église. On 29 September No. 4 Squadron moved to Serny, and on 3 October received its first six Sopwith Snipes, eventually replacing all their Camels by the 19th.

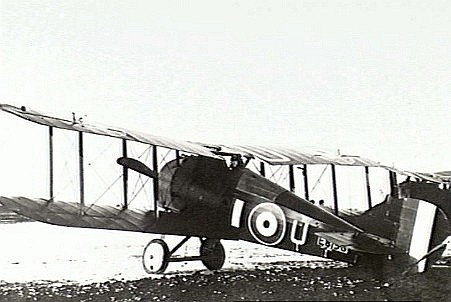
Sopwith Snipe of No. 4 Squadron AFC

On 5 October 1918 a recommendation for the award of the Distinguished Flying Cross was submitted by Brigadier General Edgar Ludlow-Hewitt, General Officer Commanding, 10th Brigade, Royal Air Force. It lists all the operations carried out by Barkell in just four days, from 29 September to 3 October, which included bombing attacks on five railway stations, and on motorized, horse-drawn and canal transports, artillery, and an observation balloon. It also noted that all but one were made from altitudes of less than 1,500 feet (460 m). The award was approved on 10 October, and was gazetted on 3 December 1918. His citation read:

Second Lieutenant Thomas Harry Barkell, Australian Flying Corps.

"Although this officer only joined his squadron some two months ago, his outstanding ability soon qualified him for the leadership of a patrol; and he has already acted as leader in twenty-three offensive flights. His conduct of these patrols, and the results he has achieved, testify to his exceptional enterprise, and fully justifies his early appointment to the responsible position of leader."

On 9 October, Barkell attacked an observation balloon west of Douai, seeing the crew parachute to safety while the balloon was set on fire. On 26 October, he was a member of a patrol that attacked a formation of enemy biplanes east of Tournai, and was credited with shooting down two. However, he was also wounded in the leg, sent to No. 5 Casualty Clearing Station, and on 27 October was written off the strength of No. 4 Squadron.

=== List of aerial victories ===
Combat record
No.	Date/Time	Aircraft/ Serial No.	Opponent	Result	Location
1	7 September 1918 @ 0700	Sopwith Camel (F1415)	LVG C	Destroyed	Hénin-Beaumont
2	16 September 1918 @ 0820	Sopwith Camel (E7191)	Fokker D.VII	Destroyed	Frelinghien
3	22 September 1918 @ 0820	Sopwith Camel (E7191)	Fokker D.VII	Out of control	East of Armentières
4	22 September 1918 @ 0820	Sopwith Camel (E7191)	Fokker D.VII	Out of control	Armentières
5	9 October 1918 @ 0955	Sopwith Snipe (E8052)	Balloon	Destroyed	West of Douai
6	26 October 1918 @ 1545	Sopwith Snipe (E8032)	Fokker D.VII	Destroyed in flames	East of Tournai
7	26 October 1918 @ 1545	Sopwith Snipe (E8032)	Fokker D.VII	Out of control	East of Tournai

== Post-war career ==
Barkell eventually returned to Australia on 7 February 1919, where he continued to fly as a commercial pilot. He gained the dubious distinction of being the first pilot prosecuted under the terms of the Air Navigation Act of 1920 when he was fined £5 in July 1922 for flying while his license was suspended. He was also involved in two accidents; in May 1922 he suffered an engine failure while conducting flights at Bulli Park and had to make a forced landing on Sandon Point, and in January 1923 he crashed an aircraft belonging to the Australian Aircraft and Engineering Company at Cronulla, breaking his toe.

== See also ==
- Military history of Australia during World War I
