= Wallace Alexander Smart =

Scottish and British Royal Air Force flying ace (1898–1943)

- Born: 7 January 1898; Aberdeen, Aberdeenshire
- Died: 23 December 1943 (aged 45); Cardiff, Wales
- Military career
- Allegiance: United Kingdom
- Branch: British Army (1917–18); Royal Air Force (1918–19)
- Service years: c. 1917–19
- Rank: Lieutenant
- Unit: No. 1 Squadron RFC (1918–19)
- Conflicts: First World War

Wallace Alexander Smart (born 7 January 1898 – 23 December 1943) was a Scottish-born British soldier, air force pilot, and fighter ace in the First World War.

== Life and career ==
Wallace Alexander Smart was born on 7 January 1898, in Aberdeen, Scotland, to parents Alexander and Elizabeth Smart.

Due to his young age, he was not able to join the Royal Air Force (RAF) of the United Kingdom until early 1918.

=== Military service ===
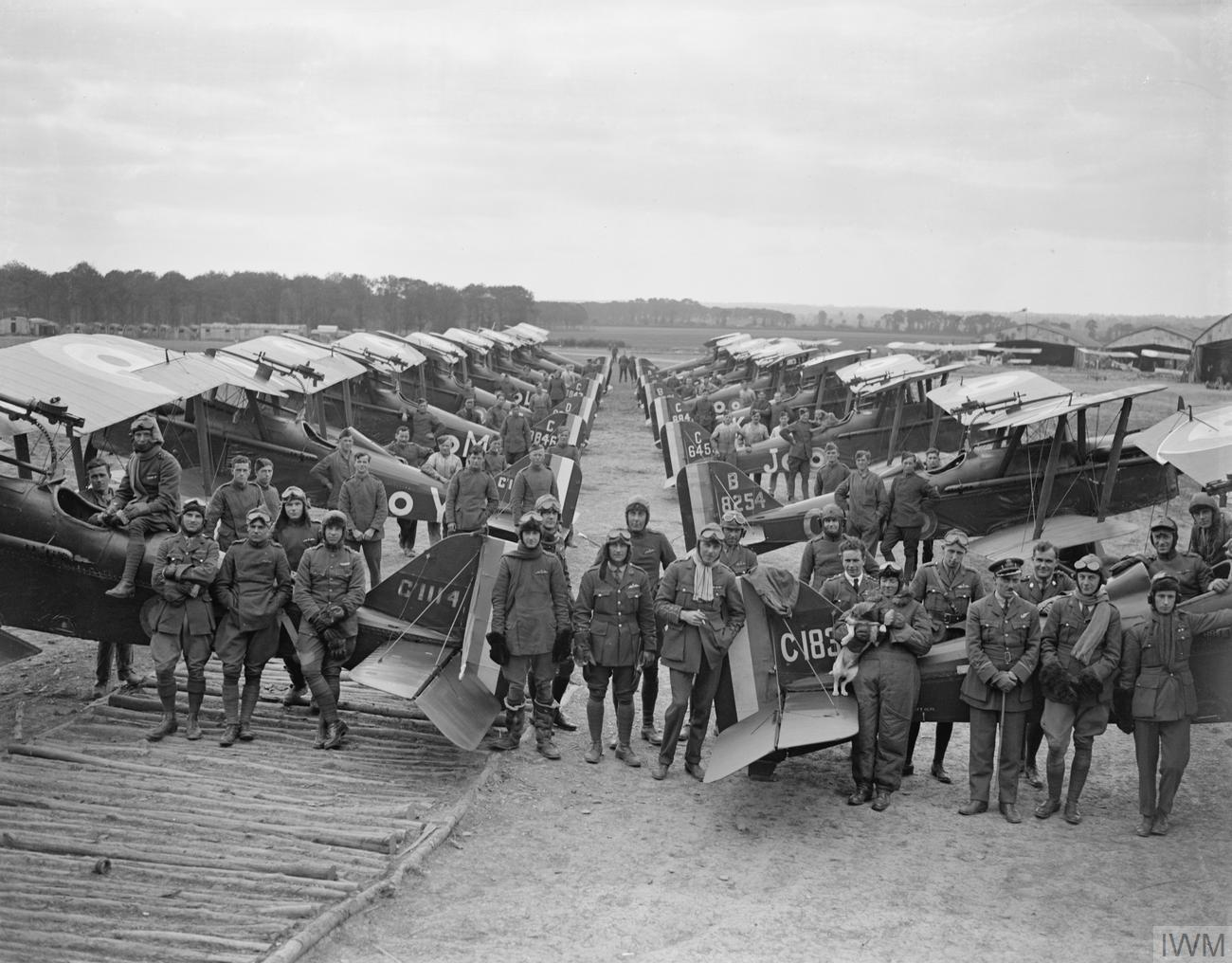
Wallace Smart seen standing with his hands in his pockets, second from left (3 July 1918)

On 10 April 1918, he joined the No. 1 Squadron in France, one of the most successful squadrons of the RAF. He scored his first aerial victory on the last day of May 1918 against a German Albatros DV aircraft. He shared his second victory with other pilots the following evening, near Armentières . His next victory was a month later, on 1 July, against a Halberstadt C aircraft, with Harold Kullberg and John Bateman. He scored his two further victories at the beginning and end of October (on the 1st and 29th respectively). Both were against Fokker D.VII, and his fourth victory on the 1st was shared with seven other pilots. Throughout his service, he flew a British SE5a fighter, and he also achieved his aerial victories with this aircraft.

=== List of aerial victories ===
Serial number	Date	Unit	Aircraft	Opponent
1	31 May 1918	No. 1 Squadron RAF	S.E.5a	Albatros D.V
2	1 June 1918	No. 1 Squadron RAF	S.E.5a	Pfalz D.III
3	1 July 1918	No. 1 Squadron RAF	S.E.5a	Halberstadt C
4	1 October 1918	No. 1 Squadron RAF	S.E.5a	Fokker D.VII
5	29 October 1918	No. 1 Squadron RAF	S.E.5a	Fokker D.VII
