= Frederick Stanton (RAF officer) =

British flying ace (1895–1979)

Frederick Cecil Stanton
- Born: 30 October 1895; Emberton, Buckinghamshire, England
- Died: 20 March 1979 (aged 83); Newport, Pembrokeshire, Wales
- Military career
- Allegiance: United Kingdom
- Branch: British Army; Royal Air Force
- Service years: 1914–1919
- Rank: Lieutenant
- Units: Oxfordshire and Buckinghamshire Light Infantry; No. 24 Squadron RAF; No. 22 Squadron RAF
- Conflicts: World War I • Western Front
- Awards: Distinguished Conduct Medal; Croix de guerre (France)

Lieutenant Frederick Cecil Stanton DCM (30 October 1895 – 20 March 1979) was a British World War I flying ace credited with seven aerial victories.

== Military service ==
Stanton was born in Emberton, Buckinghamshire, the son of William Charles and Kate Dunkley Stanton, who ran the post office there. He enlisted on 2 September 1914 into the 6th Battalion of the Oxfordshire and Buckinghamshire Light Infantry, and served in France from 22 July 1915 to 16 March 1917.

On 24 November 1916 he was awarded the Distinguished Conduct Medal. His citation read:

12636 Lance Corporal F. C. Stanton, Oxf. & Bucks. L.I.

"For conspicuous gallantry in action. When the enemy began sniping at his men from a trench to his right rear, he immediately took some of his men and bombed the enemy down this trench, thereby allowing the neighbouring troops to capture the position."

Stanton was promoted to sergeant on 3 September 1916, and on 1 May 1917 he was given permission to wear the Croix de guerre awarded to him by France.

He then joined the Royal Flying Corps as a cadet, being commissioned as a temporary second lieutenant (on probation) on 26 September 1917, and was confirmed in his rank on 18 March 1918.

He was first posted to No. 24 Squadron, but on 29 May was transferred to No. 22 Squadron. Between 10 July and 27 August, flying a Bristol F.2b two-seater fighter with Lieutenant Clifford Tolman as his observer/gunner, he accounted for seven enemy aircraft, three driven down out of control, and four destroyed.

Stanton was transferred to the RAF unemployed list on 14 June 1919.

== List of aerial victories ==
Combat record
No.	Date/Time	Aircraft/ Serial No.	Opponent	Result	Location
1	10 July 1918 @ 1015–1030	Bristol F.2b (D8089)	Pfalz D.III	Destroyed	South of Lille
2	10 July 1918 @ 1015–1030	Bristol F.2b (D8089)	Pfalz D.III	Destroyed	South of Lille
3	10 July 1918 @ 1015–1030	Bristol F.2b (D8089)	DFW C	Driven down out of control	South of Lille
4	13 August 1918 @ 1120	Bristol F.2b (D8089)	Fokker D.VII	Destroyed	Auberchicourt
5	13 August 1918 @ 1120	Bristol F.2b (D8089)	Fokker D.VII	Destroyed in flames	Auberchicourt
6	21 August 1918 @ 1945	Bristol F.2b (E2500)	Two-seater	Driven down out of control	Albert
7	27 August 1918 @ 1400	Bristol F.2b (E2500)	Fokker D.VII	Driven down out of control	South-east of Senlemont
