= Herbert Ellis (RAF officer) =

English World War I flying ace

Herbert Edward Oscar Ellis
- Born: 15 July 1893; Hoxton, Middlesex, England
- Military career
- Allegiance: United Kingdom
- Branch: British Army; Royal Air Force
- Service years: 1915–1919
- Rank: Captain
- Unit: No. 40 Squadron RFC
- Awards: Military Cross

Captain Herbert Edward Oscar Ellis MC (15 July 1893 – date of death unknown) was an English World War I flying ace credited with seven aerial victories. On 4 May 1917, after running out of machine gun ammunition, he scored his third victory of the day with pistol fire.

== Military service ==
Ellis was commissioned as a temporary second lieutenant in the Corps of Royal Engineers on 16 March 1915. He was promoted to lieutenant on 2 May 1916, and was awarded the Military Cross on 18 August 1916, his citation reading:

Temporary Second Lieutenant Herbert Edward Oscar Ellis, Royal Engineers.
For conspicuous gallantry and ability when organising the communications for an attack, and later for keeping them up under a heavy bombardment during the operations.

He was transferred to the Royal Flying Corps, receiving Royal Aero Club Aviator's Certificate No. 3829 after flying a Maurice Farman biplane at the Military Flying School, Birmingham, on 2 November 1916, and was appointed a flying officer on 7 February 1917.

Posted to No. 40 Squadron flying the Nieuport Scout, Ellis scored four victories during Bloody April 1917, on the 13th, 23rd, 26th, and 28th. On 4 May 1917, he engaged three Albatros D.III fighters over Douai. One he shot down at 500 feet, and sent a second into a crash-landing, but the third got on his tail even as Ellis ran out of machine gun ammunition. He managed to drop below it and emptied his service pistol into it. It fell into a sideslip that tore off its bottom wing, then plunged into a pond. Ellis' final tally was six enemy planes destroyed, and one driven down out of control. Two days after this triple triumph, Ellis was injured in a crash which ended his career as a fighter pilot.

Ellis remained in the RFC, but lost his flying officer status on 19 September 1917, being appointed an Equipment Officer, 3rd class. He was promoted to Experimental Officer, 2nd class (graded as an Equipment Officer, 2nd class) on 1 January 1918, and was promoted to captain in the Technical Branch on 1 April 1918, the same day that the RFC was merged with the Royal Naval Air Service to form the Royal Air Force.

Ellis finally left the RAF, being transferred to the unemployed list on 15 February 1919.
