= Thomas Le Mesurier (RAF officer) =

British flying ace of the First World War

Thomas Frederick Le Mesurier
- Born: 6 February 1897; Shepherd's Bush, London
- Died: 26 May 1918 (aged 21); Pervijze, Belgium
- Burial place: Dunkirk Town Cemetery, Dunkirk, France; 51°01′42″N 2°23′18″E
- Military career
- Allegiance: United Kingdom
- Branch: Royal Navy; Royal Air Force
- Service years: 1915–1918
- Rank: Captain
- Units: No. 5 Squadron RNAS; No. 211 Squadron RAF
- Conflicts: First World War; Western Front
- Awards: Distinguished Service Cross & Two Bars; Mentioned in dispatches

Captain Thomas Frederick Le Mesurier DSC & Two Bars (6 February 1897 – 26 May 1918) was a British flying ace of the First World War credited with seven aerial victories. Le Mesurier was awarded the Distinguished Service Cross (DSC) and Two Bars for his conspicuous service in bombing operations.

== Early life ==
Thomas Le Mesurier was born on 6 February 1897, in Shepherd's Bush, London to Ernest Cecil Le Mesurier and his wife Gertrude Arabella Swain. He was educated at St. John's College, Hurstpierpoint, Sussex.

== Military career ==
Le Mesurier was commissioned as a sub-lieutenant in the Royal Naval Reserve in March 1915, and was confirmed in his rank of flight sub-lieutenant in the Royal Naval Air Service on 23 July 1915. His records show that as he passed flying training at the Central Flying School at Upavon, and was granted Royal Aero Club Aviator's Certificate No. 2753 on 17 March 1916. He was then posted to No. 5 Squadron RNAS, flying the Airco DH.4 two-seater day bomber. Le Mesurier was promoted to flight lieutenant on 31 December 1916.

Le Mesurier's first aerial victory came on 3 June 1917 when, with observer Flight Sub-Lieutenant R.G. St. John, he drove down out of control an Albatros D.III west of Bruges. His next came on 5 June when he destroyed and drove down two more D.IIIs over Snellegem and Diksmuide, with observer Aerial Gun Layer H.S. Jackson.

Le Mesurier was promoted to flight commander on 30 June 1917. He would share all his subsequent victories with ASL Jackson, all over Albatros D.Vs, and occurring on 19 August, 11 September, and 15 and 21 October.

On 1 April 1918 the Royal Naval Air Service (RNAS) and the Army's Royal Flying Corps (RFC) were merged to form the Royal Air Force, and Le Mesurier's rank of flight commander was converted to the RAF equivalent of captain. He was also transferred to No. 211 Squadron RAF (formerly No. 11 (Naval) Squadron) at some point after 10 March 1918.

=== Death ===
On the morning of 26 May 1918, Le Mesurier and his observer, Second Lieutenant R. Lardner, were flying an Airco DH.9 (number D1693) on a test flight when they were engaged by German Marine Flak near Schoorbakke and suffered severe damage to the aircraft. Le Mesurier managed to pilot the stricken aircraft back towards his own lines, but crashed after the port wing folded up crossing over the trenches at 20 feet (6.1 m) near Pervijze. The aircraft was completely wrecked, but salvaged on 27 May and taken to No. 8 Air Park. Lardner was killed instantly, and Le Mesurier died later.

Le Mesurier is buried in the Town Cemetery in Dunkirk.

== Awards and honours ==
Distinguished Service Cross
Flight-Lieutenant Thomas Frederick Le Mesurier, RNAS. (12 May 1917).

"For conspicuous work as a pilot of a bombing machine. Has taken part in fourteen raids and numerous fighter patrols."

Bar to the Distinguished Service Cross
Flight Commander Thomas Frederick Le Mesurier, DSC, RNAS. (29 August 1917).

"For consistent skill and courage in leading his flight on bombing raids, particularly on the 28th July, 1917."

Mentioned in Despatches
Flight Commander Thomas Frederick Le Mesurier, DSC, RNAS. (14 September 1917).

Second Bar to the Distinguished Service Cross
Lieutenant (temporary Captain) Thomas Frederick Le Mesurier, DSC, RAF. (21 June 1918).

"For gallantry and consistent good work. He has at all times displayed the utmost gallantry in action, and by his determination and skill has set a very fine example to the pilots of his squadron. On the 23rd April, 1918, in spite of bad weather conditions, he successfully dropped bombs on the Ostend Docks from a height of 800 feet amidst very intense anti-aircraft and machine-gun fire. He also made valuable observations. He has taken part in many bomb raids, and has destroyed or driven down out of control several enemy machines."

== Bibliography ==
- Abbott, P. E. & Tamplin, J. M. A. (1971). British Gallantry Awards. London: Guinness Superlatives Ltd. ISBN 9780851121734.
