= Sidney Cowan =

Sidney Edward Cowan
- Born: 23 August 1897; Downpatrick, Ireland
- Died: 17 November 1916 (aged 19); Pas de Calais, France
- Burial place: British War Cemetery, Cagnicourt
- Military career
- Allegiance: United Kingdom
- Branch: British Army
- Service years: 1915–1916
- Rank: Captain
- Units: No. 24 Squadron RFC; No. 29 Squadron RFC
- Conflicts: World War I
- Awards: Military Cross & Two Bars

Sidney Edward Cowan MC & Two Bars (23 August 1897 – 17 November 1916) was an Irish World War I flying ace credited with seven aerial victories.

== Biography ==
Cowan was born in Downpatrick, Ireland, the youngest son of P. C. Cowan, Chief Engineering Inspector of the Local Government Board for Ireland. He was educated at Castle Park, Dalkey, Marlborough College, and Trinity College, Dublin.

On 23 August 1915 (his 18th birthday) Cowan was awarded Aviators Certificate No. 1639 after flying a Maurice Farman biplane at the Military School at Brooklands, and the same day was commissioned as a probationary second lieutenant in the Royal Flying Corps. He was appointed a flying officer on 14 October, and confirmed in his rank on 2 November.

Cowan was an original member of No. 24 Squadron from its formation on 1 September 1915. Between 4 May and 16 September 1916, Cowan used an Airco DH.2 to destroy four enemy aircraft and drive down two more out of control. On 1 October he was appointed a flight commander, and promoted to the acting rank of captain. He was then transferred to No. 29 Squadron, and scored once more on 17 November 1916, driving down a Halberstadt D.II out of control. As he strove to attack a second German machine, he collided with another British aircraft. Both pilots were killed.

Originally listed as "missing" it was not until April 1917 that his grave was reported as being discovered, Cowan having been buried by the Germans at the cemetery at Ablainzevelle. He was later re-interred at the British War Cemetery at Cagnicourt.

== Honours and awards ==
Military Cross
Second Lieutenant Sidney Edward Cowan, RFC.
For conspicuous gallantry and skill. He dived on to an enemy machine in the enemy's lines and drove it to the ground, where it was smashed, and then circled round and fired at the pilot and observer as they ran for shelter. Although forced to land through his engine stopping he contrived to restart it and got back under heavy fire.

Bar to Military Cross
Second Lieutenant Sidney Edward Cowan, MC, RFC.
For conspicuous gallantry and skill. He has done fine work in aerial combats, and has shot down four enemy machines.

2nd Bar to Military Cross
Second Lieutenant (Temporary Captain) Sidney Edward Cowan, MC, RFC.
For conspicuous gallantry in action. He fought a long contest with seven enemy machines, finally bringing one down in flames. He has displayed great skill and gallantry throughout.

== See also ==
- List of solved missing person cases
