= Herbert Drewitt =

New Zealand World War I flying ace

Herbert Frank Stacey Drewitt
- Born: 25 March 1895; Christchurch, New Zealand
- Died: 4 January 1927 (aged 31); England
- Military career
- Allegiance: New Zealand
- Branch: Aviation
- Rank: Captain
- Units: No. 23 Squadron RFC, No. 79 Squadron RAF
- Awards: British Military Cross and Air Force Cross

Captain Herbert Frank Stacey Drewitt MC AFC (25 March 1895 – 4 January 1927) was a New Zealand World War I flying ace credited with seven aerial victories. He was one of the few Royal Army aces that used French-built Spads as his weapon.

== World War I service ==
Drewitt, a native of Christchurch, New Zealand, served originally in 23 Squadron. For his first kill, he used a Spad VII to shoot a German observation plane down in flames on 17 October 1917. Ten days later, he sent an Albatros D.V down out of control. He repeated the feat on 24 January 1918. On 11 March 1918, he switched mounts to a Spad XIII to defeat an observation plane. The following day saw him back in his Spad VII, as he destroyed an Albatros D.V. On both 15 and 16 March, he destroyed an enemy reconnaissance plane. Drewitt moved on to fly a Sopwith Dolphin for 79 Squadron, but never scored again.

== Postwar ==
Drewitt died of illness in England on 5 January 1927.

== Honors and awards ==
Military Cross (MC)

2nd Lt. (T./Capt.) Herbert Frank Stacey Drewitt, R.F.C., Spec. Res.

"For conspicuous gallantry and devotion to duty. He, with another pilot, persistently attacked a large body of hostile cavalry, with the result that great confusion was caused, many casualties inflicted, and the horses stampeded in all directions. On a later occasion he engaged with machine-gun fire from a low altitude two hostile field batteries which were shelling our infantry. He has destroyed in all six enemy machines and has brought down out of control six others. He has displayed exceptional skill and gallantry". (Supplement to the London Gazette, 22 June 1918) (30761/7408)
