= Charles Allen (RAF officer) =

Charles Philip Allen
- Born: 3 April 1899; Liverpool, Lancashire, United Kingdom
- Died: 6 January 1974 (aged 74)
- Military career
- Allegiance: United Kingdom
- Branch: Royal Air Force
- Rank: Captain
- Unit: No. 204 Squadron RAF
- Conflicts: World War I
- Awards: Belgian Order of the Crown; Belgian Croix de Guerre

Captain Charles Philip Allen (born 3 April 1899 – 6 January 1974) was a British World War I flying ace credited with seven aerial victories.

Born in Liverpool, Allen joined the Royal Flying Corps as an officer cadet, and was commissioned as a Temporary Second Lieutenant on 26 September 1917.

He was posted to 204 Squadron RAF on 5 April 1918, and shot down seven Fokker D.VIIs between June and November, while flying the Sopwith Camel.

Allen received two awards from Belgium, being gazetted a Chevalier de l'Ordre de la Couronne ("Knight of the Order of the Crown") on 8 February 1919, and being awarded the Croix de Guerre by His Majesty the King of the Belgians on 15 July 1919.

After the war ended, Allen commanded an artillery battery, before going to medical school. He graduated from Liverpool University in 1925, and joined the Royal Army Medical Corps. He eventually became a surgeon, and served as a lieutenant-colonel in the RAMC for West Africa during the second World War.

== List of aerial victories ==
All victories gained while flying with No. 204 Squadron RAF.

No.	Date/time	Aircraft	Foe	Result	Location
1	29 June 1918 @ 1445 hours	Sopwith Camel; No. D3332	Fokker DVII	Driven down out of control	South of Ghistelles
2	15 August 1918 @ 1905 hours	Sopwith Camel; No. D8222	Fokker DVII	Driven down out of control	Menen
3	24 September 1918 @ 1850 hours	Sopwith Camel; No. D8222	Fokker DVII	Driven down out of control	Pervyse
4	27 October 1918 @ 0910 hours	Sopwith Camel; No. D9600	Fokker DVII	Destroyed	South of Ghent
5	27 October 1918 @ 0910 hours	Sopwith Camel; No. D9600	Fokker DVII	Driven down out of control	South of Ghent
6	30 October 1918 @ 1315 hours	Sopwith Camel; No. B7860	Fokker DVII	Destroyed on fire	Nazareth
7	4 November 1918 @ 0845 hours	Sopwith Camel; No. F6037	Fokker DVII	Driven down out of control	Melle
