= Ernest Morrow =

Canadian flying ace

variously Ernest Thomas Morrow of Ernest Theophilus Morrow
- Born: 21 January 1897; Waubaushene, Ontario, Canada
- Died: 20 July 1949 (aged 52); Waubaushene, Canada
- Military career
- Allegiance: Canada; United Kingdom
- Branch: Royal Flying Corps
- Service years: 1917-1919
- Rank: Captain
- Unit: No. 62 Squadron RFC/No. 62 Squadron RAF
- Awards: Distinguished Flying Cross

Captain Ernest Morrow (January 21, 1897 – July 20, 1949) was a Canadian flying ace during World War I. He was credited with seven aerial victories while flying a Bristol F.2 Fighter. His military career was cut short by a severe wounding that cost him his left lower leg, while earning him a Distinguished Flying Cross for valour.

== Early life ==
Ernest Morrow was born on 21 January 1897 in Waubaushene, Canada. the son of Elizabeth Ward and Joseph Morrow. He was living in Toronto and working as an accountant at the time of his enlistment into military service.

== World War I ==
Morrow enlisted during May 1917. He was commissioned as a second lieutenant in the Royal Flying Corps on 22 September 1917. He was then posted to No. 62 Squadron RFC on 30 October 1917, and shipped out to France with this unit. The haste with which he was commissioned and posted indicates that he took at least some of his aviation training during the Summer of 1917.

He scored his first aerial victory on 26 March 1918. After scoring three wins, he was hospitalized for a short while beginning 29 June 1918. He returned to winning form on 10 August 1918, driving down two German Pfalz D.III fighters to become an ace.

Morrow's final sortie is vividly described in the award citation for his Distinguished Flying Cross:

"On the 22nd August, whilst leading an offensive patrol, this officer attacked ten Fokker biplanes and Pfalz scouts, driving down one in flames. In the engagement he was wounded and became unconscious; regaining consciousness, he found that his machine had got into a spin and was on fire. With a supreme effort, although very weak, he succeeded in landing within our lines, where he was with great difficulty extricated from the burning machine."

Having crashlanded near Ficheux, France, with bullet wounds to the leg, Morrow was dragged from the flaming wreckage by his observer, Louis Mark Thompson. Morrow's left lower leg was subsequently amputated.

Both Thompson and Morrow were recommended for the Distinguished Flying Cross. The latter's award was gazetted on 2 November 1918, well after his 5 September medical evacuation to England.

== List of aerial victories ==
See also Aerial victory standards of World War I

No.	Date/time	Aircraft	Foe	Result	Location	Notes
1	26 March 1918	Bristol F.2 Fighter	German aircraft	Destroyed	East of Nurlu, France	Observer/gunner: Horace Merritt
2	3 May 1918 @ 1120 hours	Bristol F.2 Fighter serial number C796	Albatros D.V	Destroyed	South of Armentières, France	Observer/gunner: Horace Merritt
3	3 May 1918 @ 1120 hours	Bristol F.2 Fighter serial number C796	Albatros D.V	Driven down out of control	South of Armentières, France	Observer/gunner: Horace Merritt
4	10 August 1918	Bristol F.2 Fighter	German aircraft	Driven down out of control	Southwest of Péronne, France	Observer/gunner: Louis Mark Thompson
5	10 August 1918	Bristol F.2 Fighter	German aircraft	Driven down out of control	Southwest of Péronne, France	Observer/gunner: Louis Mark Thompson
6	22 August 1918 @ 0745 hours	Bristol F.2 Fighter s/n C895	Fokker D.VII	Driven down out of control	Pronville, France	Observer/gunner: Louis Mark Thompson
7	22 August 1918 @ 0745 hours	Bristol F.2 Fighter s/n C895	Fokker D.VII	Set afire in midair; destroyed	Pronville, France	Observer/gunner: Louis Mark Thompson

== Post World War I ==
Ernest Morrow gave up his commission because of ill health caused by wounds, retaining the honorary rank of captain, on 8 January 1919. He would live until 20 July 1949, dying in his hometown of Waubaushene.
