= Arthur Draisey =

Arthur Stuart Draisey
- Born: 21 November 1899; Brentford, Middlesex, United Kingdom
- Died: 26 April 1984 (aged 84); Hounslow, London, United Kingdom
- Military career
- Allegiance: England
- Branch: Aviation
- Service years: 1917 - 1919
- Rank: Lieutenant
- Unit: No. 20 Squadron RAF
- Awards: Russian Order of Saint Stanilas

Lieutenant Arthur Stuart Draisey was a First World War flying ace credited with seven aerial victories.

Draisey clerked at Euston Railway Station, London, from 1915–1917. He joined the Royal Flying Corps in August 1917. He was assigned as an observer/gunner to a Bristol F.2 Fighter in 20 Squadron in France, and teamed with ace pilot Frederick Harlock. The pair scored seven victories together. On 1 July 1918, they drove down a Fokker Dr.I triplane down out of control. The other six wins resulted in the destruction of Fokker D.VIIs–one on 13 August, two on 20 September, another pair on 25 September, and a final one on 27 September 1918.

Draisey resigned his commission effective 24 October 1919. His award of the Order of Saint Stanilas indicates he probably served in the British forces that intervened in the Russian Revolution during 1919.
