= George Peters (aviator) =

Australian flying ace (1894–?)

George Clifton Peters
- Born: 6 May 1894; Adelaide, Australia
- Died: unknown South Yarra Melbourne Victoria Australia
- Burial place: Springvale cemetery Victoria Australia
- Military career
- Allegiance: Australia
- Branch: Aviation
- Rank: Lieutenant
- Unit: No. 1 Squadron AFC
- Awards: Distinguished Flying Cross

Lieutenant George Clifton Peters (6 May 1894 –?) was a World War I flying ace credited with seven aerial victories.
