= William Harry Bland =

- Born: 6 June 1898; Karachi, Sind, Presidency of Bombay, Raj of India, British Empire
- Died: 24 October 1962 (aged 64); Vancouver, British Columbia, Canada
- Military career
- Allegiance: United Kingdom
- Branch: British Army; Royal Air Force
- Service years: 1918–1919
- Rank: Lieutenant
- Unit: No. 65 Squadron RAF
- Awards: Croix de guerre (France)

Lieutenant William Harry Bland (6 June 1898 in Karachi, Sind, Presidency of Bombay, Raj of India, British Empire – 24 October 1962 in Vancouver, British Columbia, Canada) was a British World War I flying ace credited with seven aerial victories.

== Biography ==
Bland was commissioned as a temporary second lieutenant on probation from cadet on 10 January 1918, and was confirmed in that rank on 15 May 1918.

He was posted to 65 Squadron flying the Sopwith Camel, and between September and November 1918 he downed seven Fokker D.VIIs.

He was awarded the Croix de Guerre with Bronze Star by France in April 1919.

Bland was transferred to the unemployed list on 30 July 1919.
