= Charles Chapman (RFC officer) =

British World War I flying ace

- Born: 9 January 1892; Bridge, Kent, England
- Died: 1 October 1917 (aged 25); Poperinghe, Belgium
- Burial place: Mendinghem Military Cemetery
- Military career
- Allegiance: United Kingdom
- Branch: British Army
- Service years: 1913–1917
- Rank: Major
- Units: East Kent Regiment; No. 24 Squadron RFC
- Commands: No. 29 Squadron RFC
- Conflicts: First World War
- Awards: Military Cross; Order of Leopold (France); Croix de Guerre (Belgium)

Charles Meredith Bouverie Chapman, MC (9 January 1892 – 1 October 1917) was a British flying ace of the First World War, credited with seven aerial victories.

== Early life ==
Chapman was born in Bridge, Kent, the son of a brewer.

== First World War ==
Chapman served as a lieutenant in the East Kent Regiment from January 1913 but was transferred to the Royal Flying Corps on 1 July 1915. He qualified as a pilot on 31 July 1915, receiving military flying training at Shorham before being posted to No. 22 Squadron RFC. On 1 April 1916, Chapman was sent with his squadron to France, based eventually at Bertangles. However, Chapman was transferred to 'B' Flight No. 24 Squadron, also based at Bertangles, using Airco DH.2 aircraft. Chapman was successful in destroying three enemy aircraft in a short period, commencing on 22 June 1916, for which he was awarded the Military Cross.

On detachment in the United Kingdom, Chapman served in a number of training units and on 1 November 1916 was promoted to the rank of captain, becoming a flight commander. In this capacity, he returned to France in May 1917 to join No. 29 Squadron at Le Hameau, flying Nieuport Scouts. Chapman was credited with all the rest of his victories flying this type of aircraft, like Georg Simon pilot in Manfred von Richthofen's Jagdstaffel 11.

Chapman died of shrapnel injuries received on 1 October 1917 after a German bombing raid on No. 29 Squadron's aerodrome at Poperinghe.
