= Walter Kirk =

Walter Alister Kirk
- Born: 6 August 1887; Belfast
- Died: 6 June 1961 (aged 73); Orange, New South Wales, Australia
- Military career
- Allegiance: Australia
- Branch: Cavalry; aviation
- Service years: 1914–1918
- Rank: Lieutenant
- Unit: No. 1 Squadron AFC
- Awards: Distinguished Flying Cross

Lieutenant Walter Alister Kirk (1887 – 1961) was a World War I flying ace credited with seven aerial victories.
