= Alfred Alexander Leitch =

- Born: 5 February 1894; Killarney, Manitoba, Canada
- Died: 31 December 1954 (aged 60); High River, Alberta, Canada
- Burial place: High River, Alberta, Canada
- Military career
- Allegiance: Canada; United Kingdom
- Branch: Royal Flying Corps; Royal Canadian Air Force
- Rank: Captain
- Nickname: "Ack Ack"
- Awards: Military Cross, Distinguished Flying Cross
- Other work: Served in Royal Canadian Air Force until 1938

Alfred Alexander Leitch was born on 5 February 1894 in Killarney, Manitoba, Canada. He grew into a tall young man. He enlisted in the Canadian Expeditionary Force on 15 May 1917 as an unmarried student. Upon his enlistment, he designated his next of kin as Mary J. Leitch of Winnipeg, Manitoba, Canada. He was accepted for military service despite having a deformed foot.

He was married to Evelyn Rachel Leitch. He died on 31 December 1954; she survived him by almost 45 years, until 22 December 1999. They are buried in Plot 274C, Range J, Highwood Cemetery, High River, Alberta, Canada.

== World War I ==
See also Aerial victory standards of World War I

After training as a pilot, he was appointed as a Flying Officer in the Royal Flying Corps in the rank of second lieutenant on 2 October 1917. He was then posted to No. 43 Squadron RFC from 28 December 1917 to 3 January 1918. He then transferred to No. 65 Squadron RFC to serve as a Sopwith Camel pilot. He scored his first aerial victory shortly after his transfer, driving down an Albatros D.V over Dadizeele on 5 February 1918.

He did not score again until 19:50 hours on 9 May, when he drove down a Pfalz D.III over Wiencourt-l'Équipée, France. Six days later, on an evening patrol, he destroyed a Fokker Triplane southeast of Albert, France. On 20 May 1918, he was promoted to the rank of captain while employed as a flight commander. Five days later, he drove down and captured an Albatros D.V at Senlis, France. He finished off May by becoming an ace, destroying another Albatros D.V southwest of Albert, France on 29 May.

On 26 June 1918, he destroyed a Pfalz D.III and drove another down out of control, scoring his double win east of Albert at 20:30 hours. On 4 September 1918 he transferred out of 65 Squadron.

He was awarded the Military Cross for valour. His Military Cross citation was gazetted on 16 September, and read, in part:

"...During recent operations he displayed great courage and determination in attacking superior forces of enemy aircraft, and in engaging with machine-gun fire enemy troops and transport on the ground...."

Shortly thereafter, on 2 November 1918, his award of the Distinguished Flying Cross was gazetted. This award citation noted:

"During the recent operations he heavily bombed an enemy dump, causing several fires; he then attacked hostile troops in the vicinity. Frequently he has returned to our lines with his machine riddled with bullets."

He had survived the war while earning the nickname "Ack Ack", a slang term for anti-aircraft fire.

== Post World War I ==
On 25 May 1919 Leitch was detailed to carry out deck trials on the world's first aircraft carrier, HMS Argus. This may explain why, two days later, he was gazetted as still employed as a captain. On 30 July 1919 he arrived in Archangel, Russia. He crashed the next day and was repatriated. On 5 September 1919 he gave up his flight lieutenant's position upon the end of his employment as such. This seems to signal the end of his career in the Royal Air Force.

After returning to his native Canada, he joined the Royal Canadian Air Force, remaining in until his retirement in 1938. He rose to the rank of Squadron Leader. When World War II came, he served as a civilian safety officer in Edmonton, Alberta with No. 16 Technical Detachment.

== See also ==
- Photographing Canada from Flying Canoes. S. Bernard Shaw, GeneralStore PublishingHouse, 2001. ISBN 1-894263-42-1, ISBN 978-1-894263-42-9.
