= James Dewhirst =

James Henry Dewhirst
- Born: 26 September 1892; Halifax, Yorkshire, England
- Died: 12 February 1928 (aged 35); Harrismith, Free State, South Africa
- Military career
- Allegiance: United Kingdom
- Branch: Royal Navy; Royal Air Force
- Rank: Lieutenant
- Unit: No. 45 Squadron RAF
- Awards: Distinguished Flying Cross

Lieutenant James Henry Dewhirst DFC (26 September 1892 – 12 March 1928) was an English World War I flying ace credited with seven aerial victories.

Dewhirst initially served in the Royal Naval Air Service before it became part of the Royal Air Force. Between March and November 1918, while serving in No. 45 Squadron, flying a Sopwith Camel, he accounted for seven German aircraft driven down out of control or destroyed.

He later married Emily Chadwick and had two children, Dorothy (b. 1923) and James Ingham (b. 1925).

He was killed in an aviation accident in South Africa, aged 35.
