= Frank Potter (aviator) =

British World War I flying ace (1891–1917)

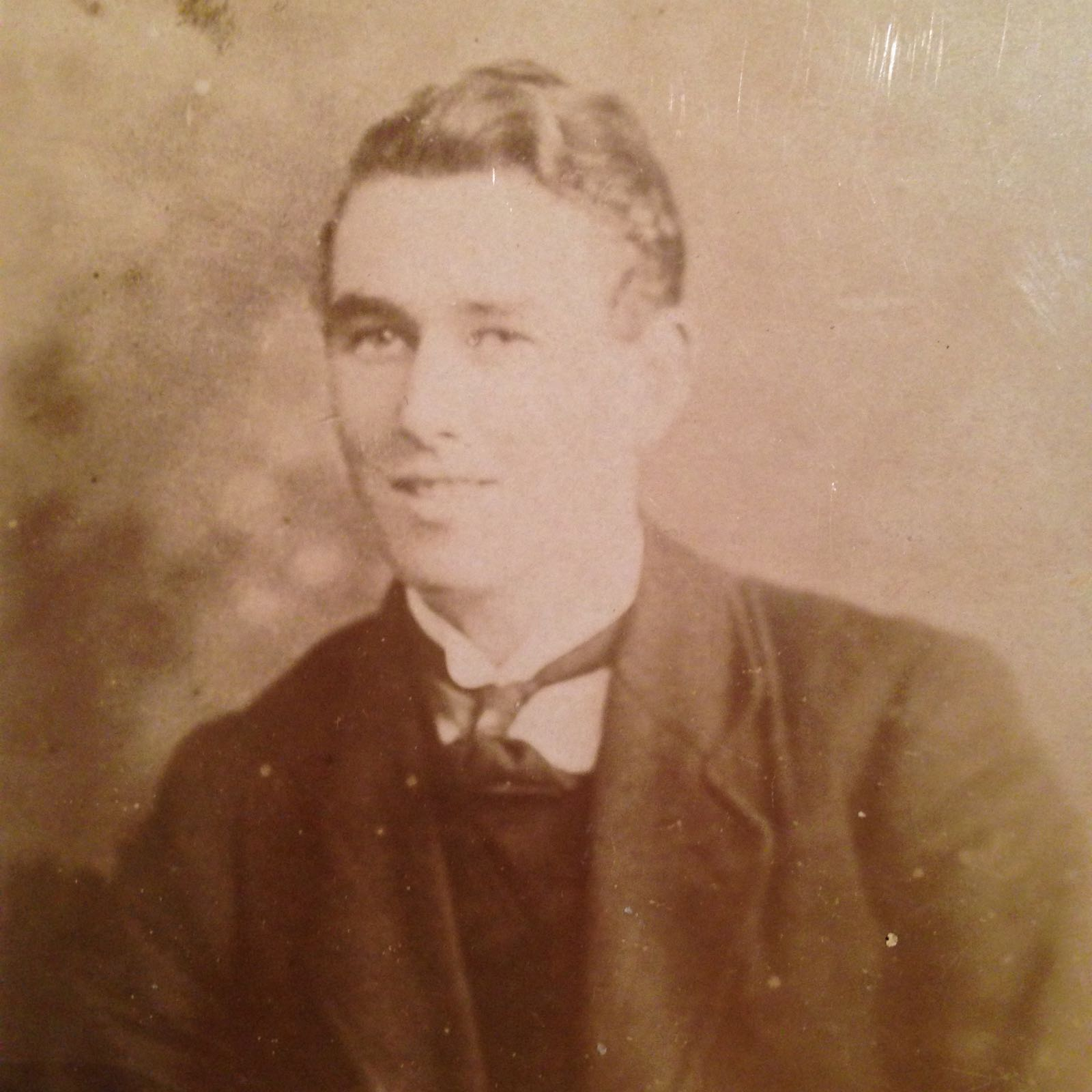
- Born: 1891; Duleek, County Meath, Ireland
- Died: 11 September 1917 (aged 25–26)
- Burial place: Communal Cemetery Extension, Bailleul, Nord, France; 50°44′16″N 2°44′35″E
- Military career
- Allegiance: United Kingdom
- Branch: British Army
- Rank: Sergeant
- Unit: No. 20 Squadron RFC
- Conflicts: World War I • Western Front
- Awards: Military Medal

Sergeant Frank Potter (1891 – 11 September 1917) was a British World War I observer who became a flying ace, being credited with seven aerial victories.

== Military service ==
In 1917 Potter was serving in No. 20 Squadron RFC, flying in the Bristol F.2b fighter. He gained his first victory with pilot Lieutenant N. V. Harrison on 16 June, driving down out of control an Albatros D.III north east of Ypres. His six following victories were all over Albatros D.Vs, between 29 June and 28 July, and were shared with pilot Lieutenant Harold Joslyn.

Potter was wounded on 5 September, eventually succumbing to his injuries on 11 September 1917. He is buried in the Communal Cemetery Extension, Bailleul, Nord.
