= Norman Trescowthick =

World War I Australian flying ace

Norman Charles Trescowthick
- Born: 18 July 1895; Clifton Hill, Victoria, Australia
- Died: 23 March 1966 (aged 70); Sarasota, Florida, United States
- Military career
- Allegiance: Australia
- Branch: Australian Flying Corps; Royal Australian Air Force
- Service years: 1916–1919
- Rank: Lieutenant
- Unit: No. 4 Squadron AFC
- Conflicts: First World War
- Awards: Distinguished Flying Cross

Norman Charles Trescowthick, DFC (18 July 1895 – 23 March 1966) was an Australian flying ace of the First World War credited with seven aerial victories.
