= Henry John Burden =

- Born: 28 April 1894; Toronto, Ontario, Canada
- Died: 28 March 1960 (aged 65); Toronto, Ontario, Canada
- Spouse: Gladys Hilliard Gamble
- Military career
- Allegiance: United Kingdom
- Branch: Royal Flying Corps; Royal Air Force
- Rank: Captain
- Nickname: Hank
- Units: No. 56 Squadron RAF, No. 72 Squadron RAF, No. 85 Squadron RAF
- Awards: Distinguished Service Order, Distinguished Flying Cross

Henry John Burden DSO DFC (28 April 1894 – 28 March 1960) was a Canadian First World War flying ace, officially credited with 16 victories.

== Life and work ==
Burden was born in Toronto, the son of Margaret Elizabeth Beattie (Eaton) and Charles Elbridge Burden, and grandson of department store founder Timothy Eaton. He first saw action with the Canadian Forestry Company in France in mid 1916.

He transferred to the Royal Flying Corps in April 1917 for flight training. Qualifying as a pilot, he flew the S.E.5a with No. 56 Squadron in France from February 1918 onwards. He claimed five Fokker D.VIIs shot down on 10 August 1918, and two days later he claimed three more. He was awarded the DSO and DFC in November 1918.

His final wartime tally consisted of 13 (and 1 shared) destroyed, and 2 'out of control'.

Burden became an architect after the war and died in March 1960 aged 64. His sister Margaret married fellow Canadian ace Billy Bishop.
