= Anthony Wall (RAF officer) =

British World War I flying ace

Anthony Herbert William Wall
- Born: 17 June 1888; London, England
- Died: December 1989 (aged 101); Newton Abbot, Devon, England
- Military career
- Allegiance: United Kingdom
- Branch: British Army; Royal Air Force
- Service years: c.1914–1919 1940–1945
- Rank: Squadron Leader
- Units: Middlesex Regiment; No. 48 Squadron RFC
- Conflicts: World War I • Western Front; World War II
- Awards: Military Cross & Bar; Order of the British Empire

Squadron Leader Anthony Herbert William Wall OBE MC* (17 June 1888 – December 1989) was a British World War I flying ace credited with sixteen aerial victories. He returned to serve in the Royal Air Force in World War II.

== World War I ==
Wall first served in the 17th Battalion of the Middlesex Regiment before transferring to the Royal Flying Corps to serve in No. 48 Squadron as an observer/gunner in a Bristol F.2 Fighter.

Paired with Australian ace Lieutenant Fred Holliday as pilot, Wall gained his first victory on 6 April 1917, and then scored twice on 23 and 24 April to become an ace. On 9 May, he destroyed a German LVG reconnaissance aircraft, and later drove down three Albatros D.III fighters. He accounted for two more fighters on 11 May, and four more in June, finally closing out his tally with his 16th victory on 3 July 1917.

On 18 July 1917 he was awarded the Military Cross. His citation read:

Temporary Captain Anthony Herbert William Wall, Middlesex Regiment and Royal Flying Corps.

"For conspicuous gallantry and devotion to duty. As an observer he has on several occasions assisted to bring down hostile machines. His coolness and accurate shooting have helped very largely in aerial combats."

Wall received a bar to his Military Cross on 25 August 1917.

Temporary Captain Anthony Herbert William Wall, MC, Middlesex Regiment and Royal Flying Corps.

"For conspicuous gallantry and devotion to duty. By his initiative and skilful manoeuvring he led six hostile machines to an encounter with our own formation, during which five out of the six hostile machines were destroyed and driven down. He had been equally successful the day before in misleading hostile aircraft, and his originality and fearless example were of the greatest value to his squadron."

Wall was elected to membership of the Royal Aero Club on 18 April 1918. On 30 September 1918 he was appointed to the acting rank of major in the Royal Air Force's Administrative Branch. He was appointed an Officer of the Order of the British Empire in the 1919 New Year Honours, "in recognition of valuable services rendered in connection with the War." Wall was finally transferred to the RAF unemployed list on 18 October 1919.

=== List of aerial victories ===
Combat record
No.	Date/Time	Aircraft/ Serial No.	Opponent	Result	Location	Notes
1	6 April 1917	Bristol F.2a	Enemy aircraft	Out of control	North-east of Arras	
2	23 April 1917	Bristol F.2a	Albatros D.III	Destroyed	Vimy	
3	23 April 1917	Bristol F.2a	Albatros D.III	Out of control	Vimy	Shared with Lieutenants William Winkler, Roger Hay & Maurice Benjamin, and Second Lieutenants Ernest Moore & William Price.
4	24 April 1917	Bristol F.2a	Two-seater	Destroyed	South-east of Arras	
5	24 April 1917	Bristol F.2a	Albatros D.III	Out of control	Cagnicourt	Shared with Lieutenants William Winkler & Roger Hay, and Second Lieutenant Ernest Moore.
6	9 May 1917 @ 0820	Bristol F.2b (A7108)	LVG C	Destroyed	Vitry – Noyelles	Shared with Second Lieutenants William Price & Ernest Moore.
7	9 May 1917 @ 1725–1735	Bristol F.2b (A7108)	Albatros D.III	Out of control	East of Vitry	
8	9 May 1917 @ 1725–1735	Bristol F.2b (A7108)	Albatros D.III	Out of control	East of Vitry	
9	9 May 1917 @ 1725–1735	Bristol F.2b (A7108)	Albatros D.III	Out of control	East of Vitry	
10	11 May 1917 @ 1605	Bristol F.2b (A7108)	Albatros D.III	Destroyed	Fresnes	
11	11 May 1917 @ 1605	Bristol F.2b (A7108)	Albatros D.III	Out of control	South-west of Izel-lès-Équerchin	
12	3 June 1917 @ 1920	Bristol F.2b (A7108)	Albatros D.III	Destroyed	Plouvain	
13	14 June 1917 @ 2015–2020	Bristol F.2b (A7108)	Albatros D.III	Destroyed	Arleux	
14	14 June 1917 @ 2015–2020	Bristol F.2b (A7108)	Albatros D.III	Out of control	Arleux	
15	15 June 1917 @ 1945	Bristol F.2b (A7108)	Albatros D.III	Out of control	Étaing	
16	3 July 1917 @ 1840	Bristol F.2b (A7108)	Albatros D.V	Out of control	Haucourt	

== World War II ==
Wall returned to military service during the Second World War being appointed a pilot officer on probation in the Administrative and Special Duties Branch of the Royal Air Force Volunteer Reserve on 3 March 1940. He was promoted to flying officer on 28 October 1940, and to flight lieutenant on 19 June 1943. Wall remained on the RAFVR Emergency List post-war until finally relinquishing his commission on 10 February 1954, and was permitted to retain the rank of squadron leader.

== Bibliography ==
- Guttman, Jon & Dempsey, Harry (2007). Bristol F2 Fighter Aces of World War I. Oxford: Osprey Publishing. ISBN 978-1-84603-201-1.
