= Thomas Rae (disambiguation) =

Thomas Rae may refer to:

- Thomas Rae (1819–1862), manufacturer and politician
- Tommy Rae (1881–1957), Scottish footballer
- Thomas G. Rae (1886–1957), Scottish World War I flying ace

== See also ==
- Tom Rae (born c. 2004), New Zealand astro-photographer
