= John Theobald Milne =

British flying ace

- Born: 20 August 1895; Kensington, London, England
- Died: 24 October 1917 (aged 22) near Merkem, Belgium
- Burial place: Arras Flying Services Memorial, France
- Military career
- Allegiance: United Kingdom
- Branch: British Army
- Service years: 1914–1917
- Rank: Captain
- Units: Oxfordshire and Buckinghamshire Light Infantry; No. 48 Squadron RFC
- Conflicts: World War I • Western Front
- Awards: Military Cross

Captain John Theobald Milne MC (20 August 1895 – 24 October 1917) was an English fighter pilot and flying ace of the Royal Flying Corps during the First World War. He was credited (with his gunners) with nine aerial victories (four destroyed and five 'out of control').

== Biography ==
Milne was born in 1895 in Kensington, London, the son of John and Isabel Milne. He was educated at Abingdon School (1905 to 1909) and then Radley College (1909 to 1912), both in Oxfordshire.

Joining the army at the outbreak of the First World War, Milne was commissioned as a temporary second lieutenant on 4 September 1914 to serve in the 6th Battalion, Oxfordshire and Buckinghamshire Light Infantry and was promoted to lieutenant on 30 December 1914. His battalion arrived in France in July 1915.

In 1916 Milne transferred to the Royal Flying Corps, being appointed a flying officer (observer) on 4 April. After completing his flight training he was appointed a flying officer on 24 June, and then appointed a flight commander, with the temporary rank of captain, on 1 October.

Eventually posted to France to serve in No. 48 Squadron, flying the Bristol Fighter, Milne gained his first aerial victory on 6 July 1917 by driving down out of control an Albatros D.III, east of Cambrai, he then destroyed an Albatros D.V south of Vitry the following day. Milne shot down another D.V over Gistel on 12 July, then returned to England on leave, where on 24 July, in the parish church of Sutton Courtenay, he married Joan Florence Hanmer (1894–1975), younger daughter of Mr. Thomas Hanmer. Milne soon returned to his squadron, and shot down two more D.Vs over Gistel on 20 August, and another the following day east of Westkerke. He shot down another over Westkerke on 25 August, then two more, one over Middelkerke on 9 September, and another over Slype on 28 September.

Milne was awarded the Military Cross, which was gazetted on 14 September 1917. His citation read:

Lieutenant (Temporary Captain) John Theobald Milne, General List and Royal Flying Corps.

"For conspicuous gallantry and devotion to duty whilst leading offensive patrols. He has shown great determination and courage in attacking hostile formations, although in superior numbers, at close range. He has also done long and arduous reconnaissances and secured good photographs under very adverse conditions and heavy fire, displaying throughout an admirable spirit of fearlessness and energy."

Around the same time he received his award Milne was listed as having been wounded in action, but soon returned to flying as he and his observer were shot down near Merkem on 24 October 1917 by Fritz Kieckhäfer of Jasta 29.

Milne is commemorated on the Arras Flying Services Memorial for airmen lost on the Western Front with no known grave.

== See also ==
- List of Old Abingdonians
