= Robert Herring (RAF officer) =

Robert Samuel Herring
- Born: 27 July 1897; Hunstanton, Norfolk, England
- Died: 11 September 1953 (aged 56); Harare, Zimbabwe
- Burial place: Harare Pioneer Cemetery
- Military career
- Allegiance: United Kingdom
- Branch: British Army; Royal Air Force
- Service years: 1914–1919; 1941–1945
- Rank: Lieutenant (Army); Pilot Officer (RAF)
- Service number: 371788 (Army); 116816 (RAF)
- Units: London Regiment; No. 48 Squadron RFC/RAF
- Conflicts: World War I; Western Front; World War II; Malayan campaign
- Awards: Military Cross

Robert Samuel Herring MC (27 July 1897 – 11 September 1953) was a British officer who served in the Army and the Royal Air Force in both World Wars. In World War I he became a flying ace, and spent most of World War II as a prisoner of the Japanese.

== World War I ==
Born in Hunstanton, Norfolk, Herring enlisted into the 16th (County of London) Battalion (Queen's Westminster Rifles), The London Regiment, part of the Territorial Force, before the outbreak of the war, and was sent to France in November 1914 to fight on the Western Front.

On 1 March 1917 he was commissioned as a second lieutenant in the 20th Battalion, London Regiment, and then transferred to the Royal Flying Corps in August, where he trained as an observer/gunner before being assigned to 48 Squadron, flying the Bristol F.2 Fighter, on 20 November 1917.

Between January and March 1918 Herring shot down five enemy aircraft:

- On 25 January Herring and his pilot Lieutenant Hugh William Elliott, were reconnoitring enemy positions over Sequehart when they were attacked by Leutnant Heinrich Kroll, Staffelführer of Jasta 24, in an Albatros D.III. Herring fired several machine gun bursts, until Kroll span away, and was forced to crash-land his damaged aircraft behind the German front lines.
- On 28 January while over Beaurevoir on another reconnaissance mission, Herring and his pilot 2nd Lieutenant Frank Cecil Ransley, attacked a formation of four enemy aircraft, and saw one, a Rumpler, spin out of control.
- On 9 February, with 2nd Lieutenant Herbert Henry Hartley, he claimed an Albatros D.V shot down over Guise.
- On 16 March 1918, over Bellicourt-Bellenglise with Lieutenant P. Burrows, he claimed another D.V and a DFW C.

On 26 March Herring was severely wounded during a dogfight, and returned to England on 4 April. On 23 January 1919 he was injured again in a flying accident. As a result of his injuries Herring finally relinquished his commission on 15 July 1919.

== World War II ==
Herring was commissioned as a pilot officer in the General Duties Branch of the Royal Air Force Volunteer Reserve on 21 December 1941 and was stationed in the Far East. On 1 February 1942, during the Malayan Campaign, he was granted an Immediate Emergency Commission as a second lieutenant on the General List of the British Army, relinquishing his RAF commission, to serve as a company commander, with the rank of captain in Dalforce, the Chinese Anti-Japanese Volunteer Battalion. He was captured by the Japanese at the fall of Singapore on 15 February 1942. He was promoted to flying officer on 1 October 1942, but this was cancelled on 28 May 1943. While a prisoner in Changi he was promoted to the rank of major by Lieutenant Colonel Edward Barclay Holmes, commander of British and Australian troops in Changi. He was finally released after the Japanese surrender in August 1945.

== Awards ==
On 22 June 1918 Herring was awarded the Military Cross. His citation read:

2nd Lt. Robert Samuel Herring, London Regiment and RFC.
For conspicuous gallantry and devotion to duty. He carried out a valuable reconnaissance under heavy fire from the ground, obtaining valuable information and engaging enemy troops with machine-gun fire with good effect. On another occasion, while on a photographic reconnaissance he was attacked by six enemy triplanes. He drove them all off after a hard fight and returned with his photographs. He has driven down four enemy machines out of control and has set a splendid example of determination and resource.

Herring was also the recipient of the 1914 Star, British War Medal and the Victory Medal after the end of World War One, and the 1939–45 Star, Pacific Star, and War Medal after World War Two.
