= John Letts (RAF officer) =

British World War I flying ace (1897–1918)

John Herbert Towne Letts
- Born: 10 June 1897; Lincoln, England
- Died: 11 October 1918 (aged 21); Belle Vue Aerodrome, France
- Burial place: Bac-du-Sud British Cemetery, Bailleulval, France; 50°13′30″N 2°36′11″E
- Military career
- Allegiance: United Kingdom
- Branch: British Army; Royal Air Force
- Service years: 1915–1918
- Rank: Captain
- Units: Lincolnshire Regiment; No. 27 Squadron RFC; No. 48 Squadron RFC; No. 87 Squadron RAF
- Conflicts: World War I; Western Front
- Awards: Military Cross

Captain John Herbert Towne Letts MC (10 June 1897 – 11 October 1918) was a British First World War flying ace credited with thirteen confirmed victories.

== Early life ==
Letts was the only child of Walter John Letts, a railway superintendent, and Charlotte Helen (née Robertson) of Steep Hill House, Lincoln. He was educated at Aldeburgh Lodge, Suffolk, Roydon Hall, Norfolk, and at Lancing College, Sussex, where he excelled in sport, representing the school in swimming, football and cricket, and was a sergeant in the Officers' Training Corps.

== Military service ==
In mid-1915 he left school to attend the Royal Military College, Sandhurst, and was commissioned as a second lieutenant in the Lincolnshire Regiment on 26 January 1916. He was immediately seconded to the Royal Flying Corps, and posted to No. 1 Reserve Squadron at RAF Gosport to begin his flying training. On 19 March he made his first solo flight, in a Maurice Farman Longhorn, after only four hours of dual instruction. His second solo flight, later the same day, ended when he crashed into the side of a shed. Letts' first attempt to gain his Royal Aero Club Aviator's Certificate was abandoned after his engine failed, but he passed on his second attempt the next day, 24 March, flying a Maurice Farman biplane at the Military School in Farnborough. Letts was appointed a flying officer on 4 May 1916.

Following advanced flying training at the Central Flying School at Upavon, on 15 June Letts was posted to No. 27 Squadron RFC in France, to fly the Martinsyde G.100 fighter-bomber. He was invalided back to England on 11 August with an injured knee, and on 19 October was posted to No. 47 Reserve Squadron at RAF Waddington, Lincolnshire, to serve as an instructor. He was reassigned to No. 48 Squadron RFC, flying the new two-seater Bristol F2b fighter, on 12 February 1917, and in March the squadron was sent to France. On 5 April Letts was appointed a flight commander with the rank of temporary captain, replacing William Leefe-Robinson, who had been shot down and captured.

On the afternoon of 9 April Letts and his observer Lieutenant Harold George Collins, accompanied by an aircraft piloted by Captain Alan Wilkinson with 2nd Lieutenant Laurence W. Allen, engaged five aircraft from Jagdgeschwader 1 – Richthofen's "Flying Circus" – in a dogfight over Arras. They jointly claimed two aircraft shot down, even though Letts aircraft was "cut to ribbons", and Collins killed. Letts next victory came on 4 May, when he and observer 2nd Lieutenant L. Speller shared in the destruction of an Albatros D.III over Pelves with pilot 2nd Lieutenant H. Smithers and observer AM2 Valentine Reed. On 11 May, in a fight with aircraft from Jagdstaffel 11, Letts and Jameson, with Smithers and AM2 Rutherford, shared an Albatros D.III shot down over Biache-Dury, but Letts' aircraft was badly damaged, and two other British aircraft were also shot down. Letts managed to nurse his aircraft back over the British front lines before crash landing. The next day he claimed two more enemy aircraft, driving down an Albatros D.III over Beaumont with 2nd Lt. Jameson in the morning, and another D.III driven down over Izel with Lt. Allen in the afternoon, bringing his total to six.

On 24 May Letts and Allen were attacked by four enemy aircraft over Vitry, and claimed to have destroyed two while driving the other two off, though Allen was wounded. They were officially credited with one victory. Letts was subsequently awarded the Military Cross, which was gazetted on 16 August. The citation read:

2nd Lieutenant (Temporary Captain) John Herbert Towne Letts, Lincolnshire Regiment and Royal Flying Corps.

"For conspicuous gallantry and devotion to duty. He attacked four large two seaters, driving two down out of control and forcing the remaining two down. He has helped to destroy eight machines, and throughout has set a splendid example."

Letts, with observer Lieutenant C. A. Malcomson, shared with Smithers and Jameson in the destruction of another Albatros D.III over Douai on 27 May. On 5 June Letts and Jameson drove down another two-seater over Riencourt–Cagnicourt. On 17 August he and Jameson were attacked by eight Albatros D.IIIs east of Nieuport. The combined fire of Jameson and 2nd Lieutenant L. H. Tanner, the observer of 2nd Lieutenant Alan Craddock Simpson, sent one enemy aircraft down in a spin until it broke apart in mid-air. On 26 July Letts was promoted to lieutenant in his regiment. On 22 August, flying with observer Lieutenant Henry Richard Power, Letts and two other Bristol Fighters intercepted ten Gotha bombers off Zeebrugge, returning from a raid on the English coast. In the battle that followed Power was hit by enemy fire, and the barrel of his gun swung round and struck Letts on the head. Despite suffering from a concussion he returned to base, discovering on landing that Power was dead. On 4 September Letts and observer 2nd Lieutenant John Frost, destroyed two Albatros D.Vs over Gistel, and on 15 September he and Frost pursued and eventually drove down another enemy aircraft north-east of Diksmuide.

Letts returned to England on 19 September, briefly serving at the Aeroplane Experimental Station at Martlesham Heath, and then as an instructor at the School of Air Fighting from October 1917. He eventually returned to front-line service at his own request, being posted to No. 42 Training Depot Squadron on 1 October 1918, before returning to France on 10 October to serve as a flight commander in No. 64 Squadron RAF. However, on arrival he was as ordered to join No. 87 Squadron RAF to fly the Sopwith Dolphin. The following day Letts borrowed an SE.5a from No. 32 Squadron RAF. Shortly after taking off the aircraft rolled, then plunged to earth killing him instantly.

He is buried in grave VI. A.30 in Bac-du-Sud British Cemetery, Bailleulval, Pas-de-Calais, France.

== Bibliography ==
- Shores, Christopher F.; Franks, Norman & Guest, Russell F. (1990). Above the Trenches: a Complete Record of the Fighter Aces and Units of the British Empire Air Forces 1915–1920. London, UK: Grub Street. ISBN 978-0-948817-19-9.
