= Walter Beales =

British flying ace (1893–1962)

- Born: 1893; Grimsby, Lincolnshire, England
- Died: 1962 (aged 68–69); Goxhill, Lincolnshire, England
- Military career
- Allegiance: United Kingdom
- Branch: British Army; Royal Air Force
- Rank: Flying Officer
- Unit: No. 48 Squadron RFC/No. 48 Squadron RAF
- Conflicts: World War I World War II
- Awards: Distinguished Conduct Medal
- Other work: Commissioned in RAFVR during World War II

Flying Officer Walter Beales DCM (1893–1962) was a British flying ace credited with nine official victories during World War I, who also served during and after World War II.

== World War I ==
Beales was the son of Alderman W. S. Beales. The younger Beales joined the Royal Flying Corps as a despatch rider in December 1914 and earned the 1914–1915 Star. Beales then switched roles to that of observer/gunner in the Bristol F.2 Fighters of 48 Squadron, which was operating on the Western Front.

He scored his first aerial victory on 21 March 1918, destroying a German Pfalz D.III while piloted by William Lewis Wells. Two days later, the crew of Beales and Wells destroyed an LVG reconnaissance plane in the morning, and another LVG and a Pfalz D.III in the evening. On 28 March, Corporal Beales was wounded in the hand while in a dogfight with a German fighter; though Beales claimed he drove down the fighter out of control, the win went unverified.

Beales brought down his fifth victim, an Albatros D.V, out of control on 1 April. On the 25th, flying with Charles Napier as his pilot, Beales destroyed a Rumpler. On 9 May, in a ten-minute dogfight, Beales and Napier drove down two Fokker Dr.I triplanes and a Pfalz D.III; in turn, they were brought down, probably by Germans from Jasta 46, but survived. Beales final tally was five German aeroplanes shot down and destroyed, four driven down out of control.

For his efforts, Beales was awarded the Distinguished Conduct Medal in April; it would be gazetted on 26 June 1918.

== Post World War I ==
Beales became a mortician at Weelsby Grove, Grimsby postwar. A Walter Beales was the licensee of the Victoria Arms public house in North Creake, Norfolk from 1922 to 1937.

In World War II, he would accept a commission in the Royal Air Force Volunteer Reserve and command a gliding school. He would later command his local Air Training Corps unit. He gave up his commission as a flying officer in the RAFVR on 1 May 1951.

== Honours and awards ==
Distinguished Conduct Medal
2565 Corporal W. Beales, RAF. (Grimsby).
For conspicuous gallantry and devotion to duty. Whilst returning alone from a reconnaissance, he was attacked by three enemy machines. Though he was wounded in the hand, he drove down one of them out of control, and drove off the others in a running fight lasting ten minutes. On a later occasion, he ably assisted his pilot in bringing down two enemy machines, one of which went down in flames. He performed excellent work during recent operations in engaging ground targets, often flying at very low altitudes under heavy fire. His keenness and determination have been a great incentive to the other N.C.O.s in his squadron.
