= Laurence W. Allen =

Laurence Wilfred Allen MC
- Born: 14 September 1892; Coventry, England
- Died: 1968 (aged 75–76)
- Military career
- Allegiance: United Kingdom
- Branch: Royal Flying Corps
- Service years: 1915–1926
- Rank: Lieutenant
- Units: Royal Warwickshire Regiment; No. 48 Squadron RFC
- Conflicts: World War I
- Awards: Military Cross

Laurence Wilfred Allen MC was an English World War I flying ace. He was credited with ten confirmed victories while serving as an observer/gunner in Bristol F.2 Fighters.

== Early life ==
Lieutenant Laurence Wilfred Allen, alias Laurence William Allen, was born in Coventry, England on 14 September 1892.

== World War I ==
Allen was originally a member of the Territorial Army, being commissioned as a second lieutenant in the Warwickshire Regiment on 20 November 1915 before switching to aviation.

On 5 April 1917, after being assigned to No. 48 Squadron RFC in France, he scored his first aerial victory while crewed with pilot Captain Alan Wilkinson in a Bristol F.2a Fighter. This was the Bristol's first day in action, and the Wilkinson/Allen success came on the heels of the new aircraft's first, disastrous patrol. On 9 April, Allen and Wilkinson shared two more victories with Captain John Letts and his observer. On 11 April 1917, Second Lieutenant Allen was officially seconded to the Royal Flying Corps.

By the end of Bloody April, Allen's score had reached seven. He scored twice in May while being piloted by Letts, being wounded in action on 24 May 1917 while downing his ninth foe. His Military Cross was gazetted two days later.

He would score once more, on 16 June 1917. His final tally included: an Albatros D.III destroyed singlehanded; two more D.IIIs destroyed in victories shared with other aircrews; a two-seater reconnaissance plane and four D.IIIs singlehandedly driven down out of control; two Albatros D.IIIs driven down and shared with other aircrews.

== Post World War I ==
Allen was transferred to the Class A Reserves of the Royal Air Force on 1 September 1922.

On 17 February 1926, he was slightly injured in the crash of Wolf no. G-EDHJ at Whitby Aerodrome. On 30 March, he transferred into the Class C Reserves. On 1 September 1926, Flying Officer Laurence Wilfred Allen completed his military service and gave up his commission.

He died in 1968 in Coventry.

== Honours and awards ==
Military Cross

2nd Lt. (temp. Lt.) Laurence Wilfred Allen, R. War. R., attd. R.F.C.

For conspicuous gallantry and devotion to duty when acting as an observer. On many occasions he has helped to shoot down and destroy hostile machines. He has shown the greatest coolness and skill on all occasions, frequently clearing difficult jams in the middle of a fight.
