= Charles Napier (RAF officer) =

British World War I flying ace

Charles George Douglas Napier
- Born: 1892; Shepherd's Bush, London, England
- Died: 15 May 1918 (aged 25–26); Lamotte, France
- Burial place: Arras Flying Services Memorial, Pas de Calais, France
- Military career
- Allegiance: United Kingdom
- Branch: British Army; Royal Air Force
- Service years: 1914–1918
- Rank: Captain
- Units: Army Cyclist Corps; No. 20 Squadron RFC; No. 48 Squadron RAF
- Conflicts: World War I
- Awards: Military Cross; Distinguished Conduct Medal; Médaille Militaire (France)

Captain Charles George Douglas Napier, MC, DCM (1892 – 15 May 1918) was a British World War I flying ace credited with nine aerial victories before being killed in action.

== Biography ==
Napier was born in Shepherd's Bush, London, England in 1892. Before the war he was employed in the Fire Department of the Employers' Liability Assurance Corporation Ltd.

=== Army service ===
He began his military service as a private in the Army Cyclist Corps. In August 1915, while serving as a corporal in the 47th Divisional Cyclist Company, Napier was awarded the Distinguished Conduct Medal. His citation read:

For conspicuous gallantry on the 25th and 26th May 1915, at Givenchy. After the withdrawal of a bombing party, and having become separated from it, he remained in the trenches with a Serjeant and some men of another Battalion, and greatly assisted this small party by the use of his bombs in retaining possession of a captured trench.

On 24 February 1916 he received the Médaille militaire from France "in recognition of ... distinguished service during the campaign".

=== Royal Flying Corps service ===
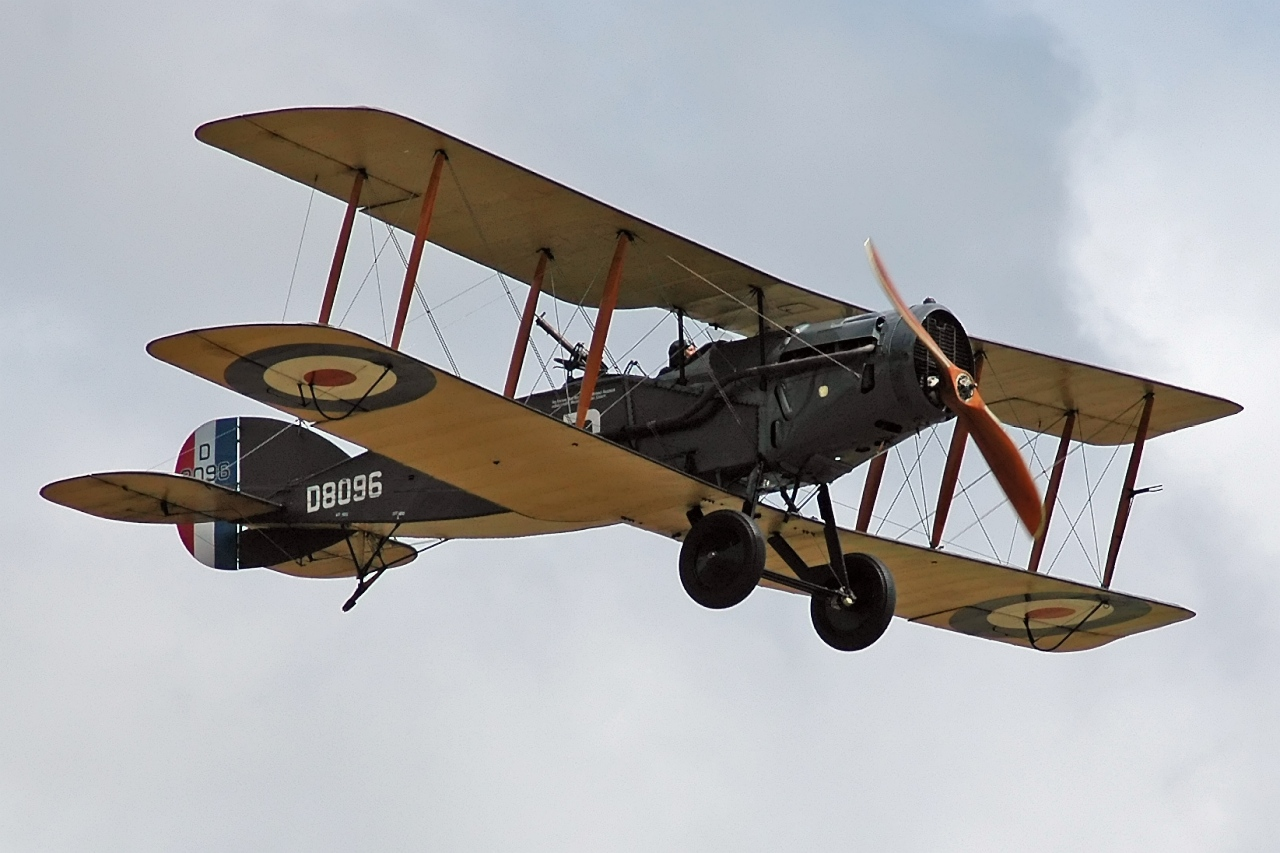
Bristol F.2B Fighter

Napier was seconded to the Royal Flying Corps, and commissioned as a temporary second lieutenant on 23 September 1917. He served with No. 20 Squadron in late 1917 before transferring to 48 Squadron in early 1918. He scored his first aerial victory while with them, on 7 February. On 4 April he was promoted to acting-captain. He would run his total to nine wins, rounding off his tally with a triple victory on 9 May; he and his gunner Walter Beales were also shot down during this action, though without injury. Six days later, he was killed in action, shot down along with his gunner of the day. On 12 June, the Germans verified Napier's death. Ten days later, his award of the Military Cross was gazetted, as follows:

On one occasion during a low-flying bombing attack he descended to a height of 100 feet and dropped four bombs amongst a body of enemy troops, causing heavy casualties and scattering the enemy in all directions. Later, whilst on offensive patrol, he observed an enemy two-seater and two scouts. He fired twenty rounds at the two-seater, with the result that it crashed, and then attacked one of the scouts, which turned over completely, and finally went down in a vertical nose dive. In all he has to his credit two enemy machines crashed and four driven down out of control. He has displayed the greatest judgment, determination and daring.

List of aerial victories
No.	Date/time	Aircraft	Foe	Result	Location	Notes
1	7 February 1918 ca. 0600 hours	Bristol F.2B Fighter	LVG reconnaissance plane	Destroyed	Le Catelet	With gunner/observer J. M. J. Moore
2	8 March 1918 ca. 0600 hours	Bristol F.2B Fighter	DFW reconnaissance plane	Set on fire; destroyed	Saint-Quentin	With gunner/observer J. M. J. Moore
3	16 March 1918 ca. 0600 hours	Bristol F.2B Fighter	LVG reconnaissance plane	Driven down out of control		With gunner/observer J. M. J. Moore
4	16 March 1918 ca. 0600 hours	Bristol F.2B Fighter	Albatros D.III	Driven down out of control		With gunner/observer J. M. J. Moore
5	27 March 1918 @ 1120 hours	Bristol F.2B Fighter (s/n C4886)	Reconnaissance plane	Destroyed	Southwest of Roye	With gunner/observer J. M. J. Moore
6	27 March 1918 @ 1120 hours	Bristol F.2B Fighter (s/n C4886)	Pfalz D.III	Driven down out of control	Southwest of Roye	With gunner/observer J. M. J. Moore
7	9 May 1918 @ 1540 hours	Bristol F.2B Fighter (s/n C4750)	Fokker Triplane	Driven down out of control	Wiencourt-l'Équipée-Mericourt	With gunner/observer Walter Beales
8	9 May 1918 @ 1540 hours	Bristol F.2B Fighter (s/n C4750)	Fokker Triplane	Driven down out of control	Wiencourt-l'Équipée-Mericourt	With gunner/observer Walter Beales
9	9 May 1918 @ 1540 hours	Bristol F.2B Fighter (s/n C4750)	Fokker Triplane	Driven down out of control	Wiencourt-l'Équipée-Mericourt	With gunner/observer Walter Beales
