= Roger Hay =

British World War I flying ace

Roger Bolton Hay
- Born: 1895; Garsdon, Wiltshire, England
- Died: 17 July 1917 (aged 21–22); Vicinity of Nieuwpoort, Belgium
- Burial place: Oostende New Communal Cemetery, Ostend, West Flanders, Belgium; 51°12′34″N 2°54′52″E
- Relatives: Hugh Hay (brother)
- Military career
- Allegiance: United Kingdom
- Branch: British Army
- Service years: 1914–1917
- Rank: Lieutenant
- Unit: No. 48 Squadron RFC
- Conflicts: World War I • Western Front
- Awards: Military Cross

Lieutenant Roger Bolton Hay MC (1895 – 17 July 1917) was a British World War I flying ace credited with five aerial victories.

== Biography ==
=== Family background and education ===
He was the youngest of three sons born to The Reverend Reynell Wreford Hay, rector of Garsdon and Lea in Wiltshire, and his wife Margaret Alice (née Bolton). His grandfather William Hay was a merchant and ship owner from Bishopwearmouth, while his uncle, William Delisle Hay, was a novelist and mycologist.

Hay was educated at Dean Close School, Cheltenham, and at Blundell's School, Tiverton, and was preparing to enrol at the University of Oxford when the war broke out.

=== World War I ===
After serving as a cadet in the Officers' Training Corps, on 27 January 1915 Hay was commissioned as a second lieutenant (on probation) in the 3rd Battalion, West Yorkshire Regiment, alongside his brothers Hugh Allport Hay (1889–1965) and Guy Baldwin Hay (1890–1951). He was confirmed in his rank on 19 November, and received orders sending him into the front lines in July 1915, but a motor-cycling accident delayed his departure until February 1916. He served in the trenches until August, when he was seconded to the Royal Flying Corps. Hay returned to England to train as a pilot, and was appointed a flying officer on 28 March 1917.

He returned to France in April 1917, and joined No. 48 Squadron, the first to be equipped with the Bristol F.2 Fighter. Hay began his victory string during Bloody April, taking a share with Fred Holliday, Anthony Wall, Ernest Moore, and William Winkler in the shooting down of an Albatros D.III over Vimy on the 23rd, and another over Cagnicourt the following day. On 27 April, he shared the destruction of a reconnaissance aircraft over Vitry with Maurice Benjamin and William Price. Hay had two further solo victories, destroying another D.III over Etaing on 15 June, and driving down a fourth over Gistel on 12 July. His final total was two aircraft destroyed and three driven down out of control.

Hay was reported missing in action on 17 July, and it was later reported that he died as a result of wounds while a prisoner of the Germans the same day.

He had been awarded the Military Cross in June, which was gazetted posthumously on 24 July. His citation read:

Lieutenant Roger Bolton Hay, West Yorkshire Regiment, Special Reserve and Royal Flying Corps.

For conspicuous gallantry and devotion to duty. On several occasions he has shown the utmost courage and dash in attacking and dispersing hostile aircraft in superior numbers. His willingness to undertake the most hazardous duties has at all times set a fine example to other pilots and observers of his squadron.

Hay is buried in the New Communal Cemetery at Ostend, Belgium.
