= Norman Roberts =

British flying ace

- Born: 22 August 1896; Broughton, Lancashire, England
- Died: 13 December 1980 (aged 84); Rhos-on-Sea, Colwyn Bay, Wales
- Military career
- Allegiance: United Kingdom
- Branch: British Army; Royal Air Force
- Service years: 1917–1918
- Rank: Lieutenant
- Unit: No. 48 Squadron RAF
- Awards: Distinguished Flying Cross

Lieutenant Norman Roberts (22 August 1896 – 13 December 1980) was a British World War I flying ace credited with five aerial victories.

== Military service ==
Roberts was commissioned as a temporary second lieutenant (on probation) in the Royal Flying Corps on 5 July 1917. He eventually flew a Bristol F.2 Fighter in No. 48 Squadron, where he scored five victories against first-line German fighters between 12 March and 27 June 1918. His final tally was two Fokker D.VIIs and a Fokker Dr.I triplane destroyed, and two triplanes driven down out of control.

== Honours and awards ==
Distinguished Flying Cross
Lieutenant Norman Roberts

"This officer has destroyed three enemy machines and driven down two others out of control. He has also distinguished himself in attacking troops at low altitudes, and has carried out valuable reconnaissance service. Detailed to make a reconnaissance of an important area, he realised, on crossing our lines, that the wind was almost at hurricane strength, and that in face of such a wind his return journey would only be accomplished with extreme difficulty. However, knowing the urgency of his mission, he completed his reconnaissance, penetrating 12 miles behind the enemy lines. On the return journey, owing to the strength of the gale, he was forced to descend to a very low altitude, and was subjected to heavy anti-aircraft and machine-gun fire, which badly damaged his machine."
