= Étinehem-Méricourt =

- Commune
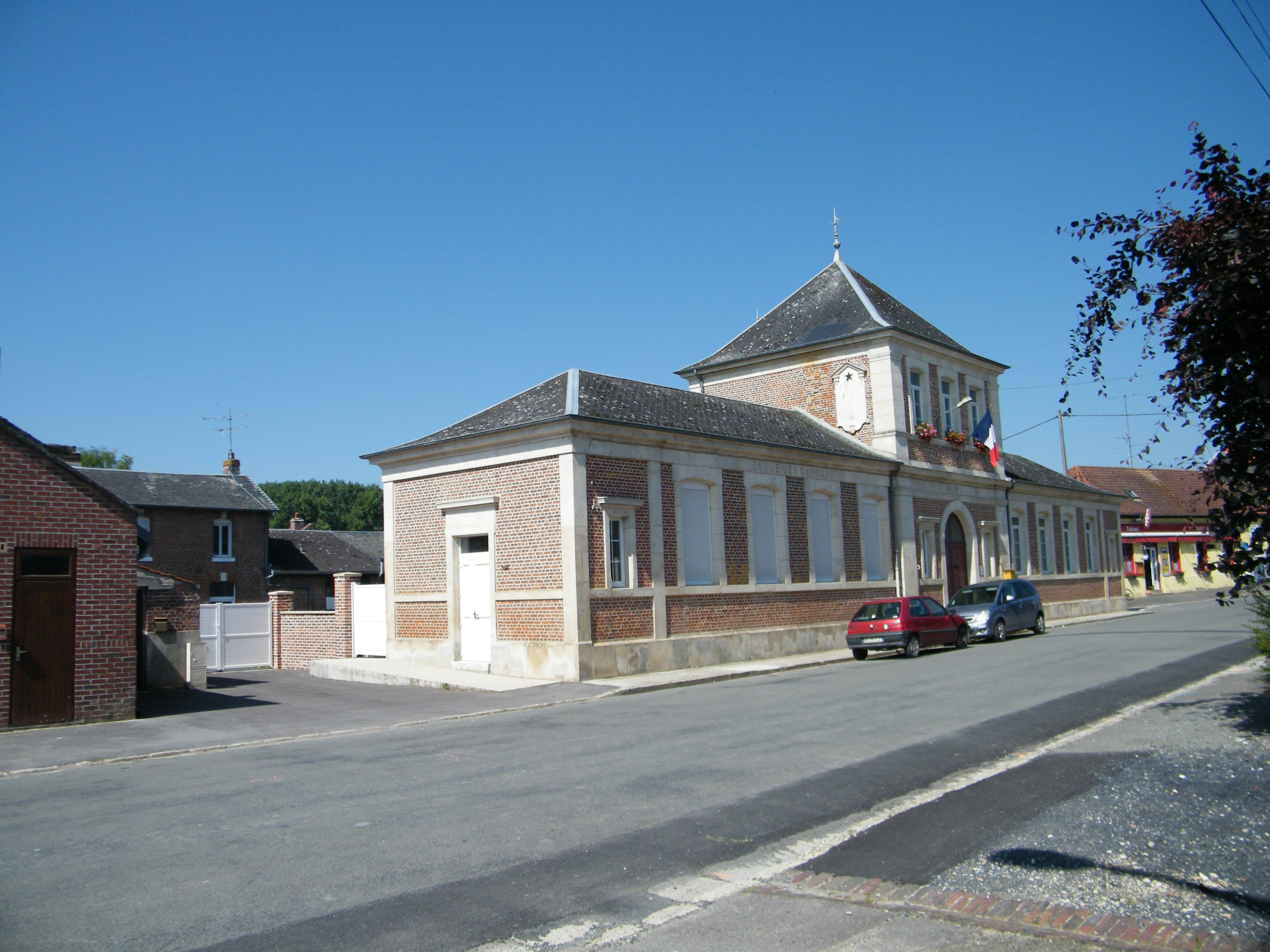
- Location of Étinehem-Méricourt
- Location within France Location within Hauts-de-France
- Coordinates: 49°55′44″N 2°41′28″E
- Country: France
- Region: Hauts-de-France
- Department: Somme
- Arrondissement: Péronne
- Canton: Albert
- Intercommunality: CC Pays du Coquelicot

Government
  - Mayor (2020–2026): Franck Beauvarlet
- Area^{1}: 18.22 km^{2} (7.03 sq mi)
- Population (2023): 589
  - Density: 32.3/km^{2} (83.7/sq mi)
- Time zone: UTC+01:00 (CET)
  - Summer (DST): UTC+02:00 (CEST)
- INSEE/Postal code: 80295 /80340
- ^{1} French Land Register data, which excludes lakes, ponds, glaciers > 1 km^{2} (0.386 sq mi or 247 acres) and river estuaries.

Étinehem-Méricourt (French pronunciation: [etinɑ̃ meʁikuʁ]) is a commune in the department of Somme, northern France. The municipality was established on 1 January 2017 by a merger of the former communes of Étinehem (the seat) and Méricourt-sur-Somme.

== See also ==
- Communes of the Somme department
