= Frank Ransley =

Frank Cecil Ransley
- Born: 18 October 1897; Caversham, Berkshire, England
- Died: 31 December 1992 (aged 95); Alton, Hampshire, England
- Military career
- Allegiance: United Kingdom
- Branch: British Army; Royal Air Force
- Rank: Captain
- Units: Royal Garrison Artillery; No. 48 Squadron RAF
- Conflicts: World War I • Western Front
- Awards: Distinguished Flying Cross; Order of the British Empire
- Other work: Governor of HMP Wandsworth

Captain Frank Cecil Ransley DFC, OBE (18 October 1897 – 31 December 1992) was a British World War I flying ace credited with nine aerial victories. He would survive the war to become one of its oldest aces before dying at 95 years of age.

== Early life ==
Frank Cecil Ransley was born in Caversham, Berkshire, England, on 18 October 1897. He first served as a gunner (regimental number 19867) in the Royal Garrison Artillery from 1914.

== World War I ==
On 10 May 1917, Ransley was a cadet appointed to the General List of the Royal Flying Corps as a temporary second lieutenant on probation. He was appointed a flying officer and confirmed in his rank on 29 September.

Ransley was posted to No. 48 Squadron in late 1917 to fly the Bristol F.2b two-seater fighter. His gunner scored an aerial victory for them on 28 January 1918. Ransley scored his second victory personally two months later. He would gain a total of nine victories by 27 June 1918, being appointed a flight commander with the temporary rank of captain on 15 May 1918.

He was awarded the Distinguished Flying Cross in June, though it was not gazetted until 3 August 1918. The citation read:

Lieutenant (temporary Captain) Frank Cecil Ransley.

"This officer displays conspicuous gallantry and skill. On a recent occasion, while on patrol he was attacked by seven enemy scouts; he and his observer drove down two, and by skilful manoeuvre and dash he rallied his formation, which were being driven down, and succeeded in driving off the remaining enemy scouts. He has, in all, destroyed three hostile machines and driven down three others completely out of control."

=== List of aerial victories ===
Combat record
No.	Date/time	Aircraft/ Serial No.	Opponent	Result	Location	Notes
1	28 January 1918 @ 1240 hours	Bristol F.2 Fighter; Serial number B1193	Rumpler reconnaissance aircraft	Driven down out of control	Beaurevoir	With 2nd Lieutenant Robert Herring as gunner/observer
2	27 March 1918 @ 1520 hours	Bristol F.2 Fighter s/n C4628	LVG reconnaissance aircraft	Destroyed	Morlancourt	With 2nd Lieutenant Joseph Moore as gunner/observer
3	12 April 1918 @ 1040 hours	Bristol F.2 Fighter s/n C4886	Pfalz D.III	Destroyed	West of Moreuil Woods	With 2nd Lieutenant L. W. Davies as gunner/observer
4	1 June 1918 @ 1805 hours	Bristol F.2 Fighter s/n C786	Albatros D.V	Set afire; destroyed	North of Lamotte	With 2nd Lieutenant G. Dixon as gunner/observer
5	1 June 1918 @ 1805 hours	Bristol F.2 Fighter s/n C786	Albatros D.V	Driven down out of control	Lamotte	With 2nd Lieutenant G. Dixon as gunner/observer
6	10 June 1918 @ 1745 hours	Bristol F.2 Fighter	Albatros D.V	Set afire; destroyed	Roye	Shared with Captain Charles Steele, Lieutenant John Elmer Drummond, & 2nd Lieutenant Harold Oaks
7	14 June 1918 @ 1530 hours	Bristol F.2 Fighter s/n C786	LVG reconnaissance aircraft	Driven down out of control	East of Albert	With Sergeant W. Lauder as gunner/observer
8	25 June 1918 @ 1145 hours	Bristol F.2 Fighter s/n C786	Fokker D.VII	Driven down out of control	Foucaucourt-Rosières	With 2nd Lieutenant L. W. Davies as gunner/observer
9	27 June 1918 @ 1800 hours	Bristol F.2 Fighter s/n C808	Fokker D.VII	Set afire; destroyed	East of Lamotte.	With 2nd Lieutenant L. W. Davies as gunner/observer

== Post-war career ==
After the war Ransley joined the Prison Service, serving as an Assistant House-master at a Borstal from 1924, and being appointed a House-master in January 1928. In early 1932 he was appointed a Governor (Class IV), and by 12 June 1958, when he was made an Officer of the Order of the British Empire, he was serving as governor of HM Prison Wandsworth.
