= William Price (RAF officer) =

William Thomas Price
- Born: 15 November 1895; Acocks Green, Yardley, Warwickshire, England
- Died: 17 January 1982 (aged 86); Leamington Spa, Warwickshire, England
- Military career
- Allegiance: United Kingdom
- Branch: British Army; Royal Air Force
- Rank: Captain
- Unit: No. 48 Squadron RFC
- Awards: Military Cross

Captain William Thomas Price MC (15 November 1895 – 17 January 1982) was a World War I flying ace who hailed from Warwickshire, England. He was credited with seven aerial victories at a time when British aviation was suffering its heaviest casualties of the war. After leaving military service, he devoted his life to teaching agriculture until his retirement in 1962.

== Early life ==
William Thomas Price was born in Acocks Green, Yardley, Warwickshire, England, on 15 November 1895. He was educated at Christ's College, London, as well as at Reading University.

== World War I ==
He began his military service in the Royal Warwickshire Regiment, being commissioned as a temporary second lieutenant on 26 August 1915.

Price volunteered for aviation duty and undertook pilot's training. On 28 November 1916, he was appointed a flying officer; this appointment signified his qualification as a pilot. He was seconded from the Royal Warwickshire Regiment to the Royal Flying Corps for duty. He was one of the founding members of No. 48 Squadron RFC, and served with them piloting a two-seater Bristol F.2 Fighter.

Price became a flying ace during Bloody April, 1917; British aviation suffered their heaviest casualties of World War I during that month. He scored two further victories on 9 May 1917, only to be shot down in turn by Lothar von Richthofen. Despite being wounded, he managed to land his aircraft in friendly territory north-east of Fampoux, France. On 1 July 1917 he was promoted to lieutenant, and was awarded the Military Cross for his gallantry on this occasion, which was gazetted on 18 July 1917:

"For conspicuous gallantry and devotion to duty. His machine being disabled by hostile fire, and his gun out of action, he managed by skilful handling to effect a safe landing, thus saving the machine and his passenger from capture. He has previously done fine work against hostile aircraft."

On 1 March 1918, Price was appointed a flight commander with the accompanying temporary rank of captain, and transferred to the General List of the RFC.

== List of aerial victories ==
No.	Date/time	Aircraft	Foe	Result	Location	Notes
1	6 April 1917	Bristol F.2 Fighter	German fighter	Driven down out of control	Douai, France	Observer/gunner: Maurice Benjamin
2	9 April 1917	Bristol F.2 Fighter	Albatros D.III	Destroyed	East of Arras, France	Observer/gunner: Maurice Benjamin
3	23 April 1917	Bristol F.2 Fighter	Albatros D.III	Driven down out of control	Vitry, France	Observer/gunner: Maurice Benjamin; victory shared with Fred Holliday, Roger Hay, and their observers
4	25 April 1917 @ 1900 hours	Bristol F.2 Fighter	Albatros D.III	Destroyed	East of Arras, France	Observer/gunner: Maurice Benjamin
5	27 April 1917	Bristol F.2 Fighter	German two-seater	Destroyed	Vitry, France	Observer/gunner: Maurice Benjamin; shared with Fred Holliday and observer
6	9 May 1917 @ 0820 hours	Bristol F.2 Fighter serial number A7110	German two-seater	Destroyed	Between Vitry and Noyelles, France	Observer/gunner: Ernest Moore; victory shared with Fred Holliday and observer
7	9 May 1917 @ 1725 hours	Bristol F.2 Fighter s/n A7110	Albatros D.III	Destroyed	East of Vitry and Fampoux, France	Observer/gunner: G. G. Claye

== Post World War I ==
On 4 February 1919, Price transferred to the unemployed list of the Royal Air Force. After leaving military service, he taught agricultural techniques until his retirement in 1962. He died on 17 January 1982, in Leamington Spa in his native Warwickshire, England.

== Bibliography ==
- Shores, Christopher F.; Franks, Norman & Guest, Russell F. (1990). Above the Trenches: a Complete Record of the Fighter Aces and Units of the British Empire Air Forces 1915–1920. London, UK: Grub Street. ISBN 978-0-948817-19-9.
