= Harold Anthony Oaks =

Canadian World War I flying ace

- Born: 12 October 1896; Hespeler, Ontario, Canada
- Died: 21 July 1968 (aged 71); Toronto, Canada
- Military career
- Allegiance: Canada
- Branch: Canadian Expeditionary Force; Royal Flying Corps
- Rank: Captain
- Nickname: "Doc"
- Unit: No. 48 Squadron RAF
- Awards: Distinguished Flying Cross
- Other work: Pioneering pilot and geologist in Canada

Captain Harold Anthony Oaks DFC (1896-1968) was a Canadian-born World War I flying ace credited with 11 confirmed aerial victories. Upon his return to Canada, his extensive pioneering activities as an aviator/geologist earned him an enshrinement in the Canadian Aviation Hall of Fame.

== Early life and infantry service ==
Harold Anthony Oaks was born in Hespeler, Canada, and raised in Preston, Ontario. At 18 years of age, he enlisted in the Canadian Expeditionary Force for service in World War I. He transferred to the Royal Flying Corps in 1917.

== World War I aerial service ==
By May 1918, Oaks had been trained and was posted to 48 Squadron as a Bristol F.2 Fighter pilot. He scored his first two aerial victories on 21 May 1918, in two separate combats. At 1815 hours, he drove a German Fokker Triplane down out of control over Carnoy, France. In 1853, he destroyed a second Triplane a mile north of Mericourt. On 10 June, he joined Frank Ransley, Charles Steele, and John Drummond in burning an Albatros D.V fighter in midair over Roye. On 25 June, he drove down a Fokker D.VII out of control. He won twice in separate combats on 2 July 1918; he destroyed one Pfalz D.III over Foucaucourt, and another over Soyecourt.

The new ace scored a double victory on 24 July, sending down two Fokker D.VIIs down out of control. On 3 August, he was credited with the capture of an Albatros reconnaissance machine at Aveluy, France. He completed his victory list with a double win on 5 September 1918, when he burned a Fokker D.VII and drove another down out of battle. Oaks' final tally included two shared wins in the destruction of enemy planes, three others destroyed singlehanded, an opposing plane captured, and five others driven down out of control.

== Post-World War I ==
When the war was over, Oaks gave up his commission on completion of service on 7 February, retaining the rank of captain. He transferred to the unemployed list of the Royal Air Force on 15 April 1919. He was awarded the Distinguished Flying Cross on 3 June 1919 by King George V.

He returned home to Canada and returned to school. He graduated in 1922 from the University of Toronto with a Bachelor of Science degree as a mining engineer. He began using airplanes as an aid to prospecting in Quebec and northern Ontario.

He invented the portable nose hangar for bush pilot use in 1926. He also founded Patricia Airways (along with G. A. Thompson) in 1926 while becoming manager and sole pilot of a newly formed Western Canada Airways in December.

In 1927, he was the initial winner of the McKee Trophy for service to aviation. In 1929, he (and Pat Reid) made the first midwinter flight to Hudson Bay.

He was also involved in the formation of several airlines, including Oaks Airways Ltd. He participated in several lifesaving mercy flights, including a search and rescue flight of 13 prospectors stranded in the subarctic. In later years, he settled into being a mining analyst in Toronto.

Harold Anthony Oaks died on 21 July 1968 in Toronto. He was inducted into the Canadian Aviation Hall of Fame in 1973.
