= Leonard A. Payne =

British World War I flying ace (1894-1919)

Leonard Allan Payne
- Born: 15 July 1894; Swaziland
- Died: 18 February 1919 (aged 24); Cologne, Germany
- Military career
- Allegiance: United Kingdom
- Branch: British Army; Royal Air Force
- Service years: 1917–1919
- Rank: Captain
- Unit: No. 48 Squadron RFC/RAF
- Awards: Military Cross

Captain Leonard Allan Payne MC (15 July 1894 – 18 February 1919) was a British First World War flying ace born in Swaziland. He was credited with 11 confirmed aerial victories while piloting a Bristol F.2 Fighter.

== World War I ==
On 1 February 1917, Payne enlisted in the Royal Flying Corps while living in his native Swaziland. Payne was commissioned from cadet to temporary second lieutenant (on probation) on 21 June 1917, and confirmed in his rank and appointed a flying officer on 24 August.

Payne was posted No. 69 Squadron in England, flying a Bristol F.2 Fighter. He scored his first aerial victory on 29 October 1917, but would not win another triumph until 3 January 1918. His third win followed on 26 February 1918, when he set a German LVG aflame in midair. He drove down two Albatros D.V fighters out of control over Mont-d'Origny on 8 March, and was an ace. Four days later, he sent down a Fokker Triplane.

Payne was appointed a flight commander, with the temporary rank of captain, on 25 April 1918. He scored three victories in May, though it is unknown if he was leading the flight for any or all of them. However, on 30 May 1918, he destroyed a Fokker D.V to become a double ace.

However, when he won the Military Cross for his valour, the emphasis was not on his air-to-air victories. When the award citation was gazetted on 26 July 1918, it read:

Temporary Second Lieutenant Leonard Allan Payne, General List and R.A.F.

"For conspicuous gallantry and devotion to duty. Volunteering to proceed on a special reconnaissance under adverse weather conditions, he penetrated for a distance of nine miles behind the enemy's lines, flying at an altitude of 200 feet, despite the most intense machine-gun and rifle fire. He returned later, his machine riddled with bullets, with the required information. Previous to this, he had bombed and engaged with machine gun fire bodies of hostile infantry with the most effective results. He has destroyed one hostile plane and driven down two others out of control. He has at all times displayed the greatest fearlessness and dash."

On 4 November 1918, Payne scored his 11th victory; it was one of his squadron's final three wins of the war. Payne's personal tally came to three solo destructions of enemy aircraft, one shared destruction, and seven German aircraft sent down out of control.

== Post World War I ==
Leonard Allan Payne was killed in a flying accident on 18 February 1919 while serving with the Army of Occupation in Germany. He was buried in Cologne Southern Cemetery, Cologne, Germany.
