= Étinehem =

Commune in Somme department, France

- Part of Étinehem-Méricourt
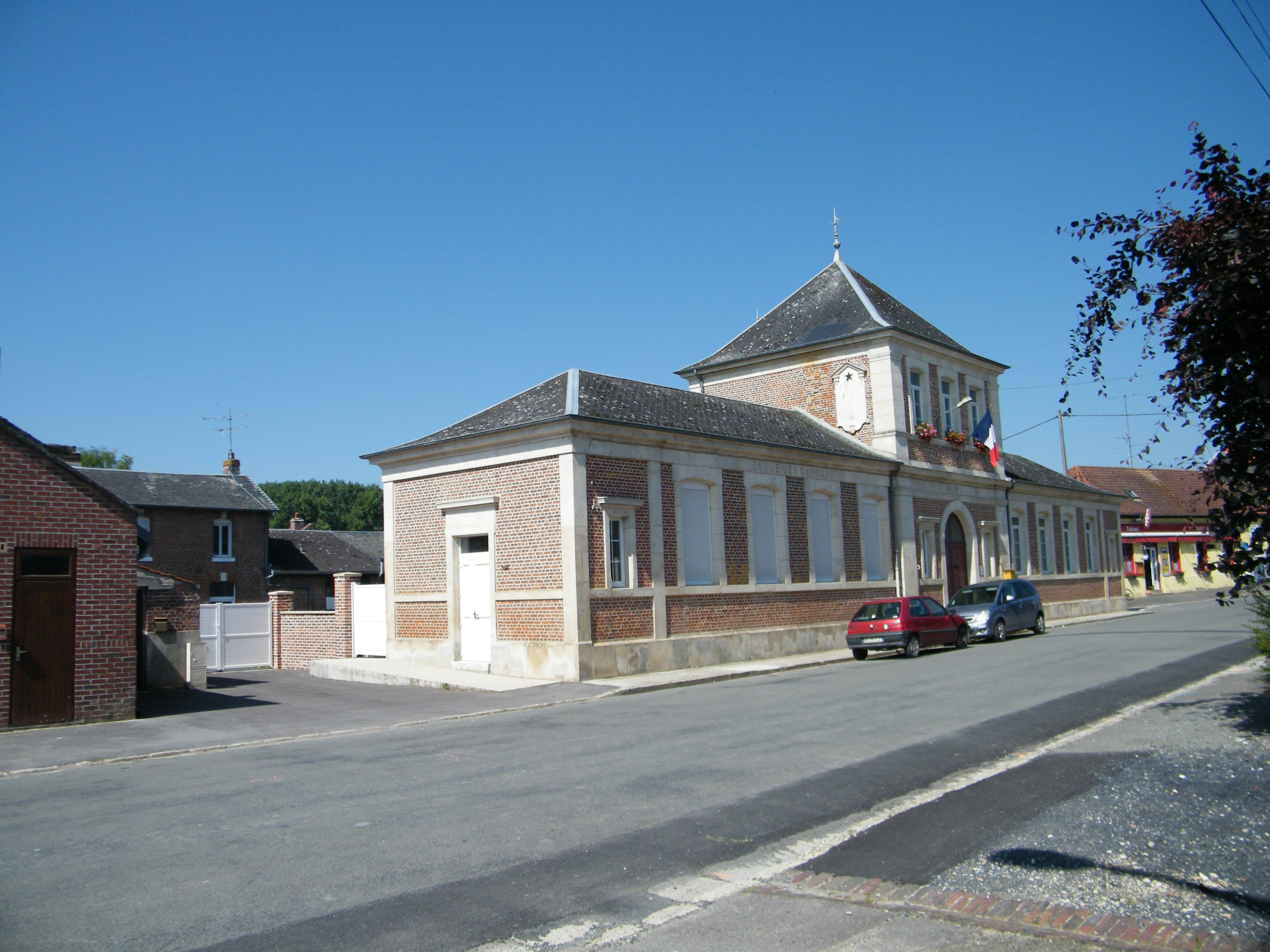
- Location of Étinehem
- Location within France Location within Hauts-de-France
- Coordinates: 49°55′43″N 2°41′27″E
- Country: France
- Region: Hauts-de-France
- Department: Somme
- Arrondissement: Péronne
- Canton: Albert
- Commune: Étinehem-Méricourt
- Area^{1}: 11.08 km^{2} (4.28 sq mi)
- Elevation: 55 m (180 ft)
- Highest elevation: 103 m (338 ft)
- Lowest elevation: 32 m (105 ft)
- Population (2023): 378
  - Density: 34.1/km^{2} (88.4/sq mi)
- Time zone: UTC+01:00 (CET)
  - Summer (DST): UTC+02:00 (CEST)
- Postal code: 80340
- ^{1} French Land Register data, which excludes lakes, ponds, glaciers > 1 km^{2} (0.386 sq mi or 247 acres) and river estuaries.

Étinehem (French pronunciation: [etinɑ̃]; Picard: Étinin) is a former commune in the Somme department in Hauts-de-France in northern France. On 1 January 2017, it was merged into the new commune Étinehem-Méricourt.

== Geography ==
Étinehem is situated on the D11 road and the banks of the river Somme, some 33 km (21 mi) east of Amiens.

== Places of interest ==
- Church of Saint Peter (1866)
- Saint Anne's chapel
- The lakes of the Haute Somme
- Ancient ruined windmill

== See also ==
- Communes of the Somme department
