= Hugh Hay =

British WWI flying ace (1889 - 1965)

Hugh Allport Hay
- Born: 24 November 1889; Newchurch, Rossendale, Lancashire, England
- Died: 13 October 1965 (aged 75); Middleton Hall, Middleton St. George, Darlington, County Durham, England
- Relatives: Roger Hay (brother)
- Military career
- Allegiance: United Kingdom
- Branch: British Army; Royal Air Force
- Service years: 1914–1919; 1939–1945
- Rank: Major
- Units: West Yorkshire Regiment; No. 11 Squadron RAF; Durham Light Infantry; Royal Artillery
- Conflicts: World War I; Western Front; World War II
- Awards: Military Cross; Efficiency Decoration

Major Hugh Allport Hay MC ED (24 November 1889 – 13 October 1965) was a British World War I flying ace credited with five aerial victories.

== Biography ==
=== Family background and education ===
He was the eldest of three sons born to The Reverend Reynell Wreford Hay and his wife Margaret Alice (née Bolton). His grandfather William Hay was a merchant and ship owner from Bishopwearmouth, while his uncle, William Delisle Hay, was a novelist and mycologist.

At the time of his birth his father was teaching at Newchurch Grammar School, Lancashire, but in 1892 was appointed the rector of Garsdon and Lea in Wiltshire. He was educated at Armstrong College, Newcastle (then part of Durham University, now part of Newcastle University).

=== World War I ===
After serving as a cadet in the Officers' Training Corps, on 27 January 1915, almost six months after the British entry into World War I, Hay was commissioned as a second lieutenant (on probation) in the 3rd (Militia) Battalion, West Yorkshire Regiment, alongside his brothers Guy Baldwin Hay (1890–1951) and Roger Bolton Hay (1895–1917).

On 2 February 1916 he was appointed a temporary supernumerary lieutenant, and on 24 June, while attached to the 1st Battalion of the West Yorkshires, was awarded the Military Cross (MC). His citation read:

2nd Lieutenant Hugh Allport Hay, Special Reserve, West Yorkshire Regiment (attd. 1st Bn.).

For gallantry and ability. He made a very close reconnaissance of enemy trenches prior to attack, and in the attack itself led his platoon with great ability. He has served for many months in the front line, and has proved himself a capable leader.

He relinquished his temporary rank on 4 July, but was promoted to full lieutenant on 26 September.

In mid-1917 Hay was seconded to the Royal Flying Corps, receiving Royal Aero Club Aviator's Certificate No. 5481 and being appointed a flying officer on 29 November.

Hay was posted to No. 11 Squadron RFC in early 1918 to fly the Bristol F.2 Fighter. On 1 April, the Army's Royal Flying Corps (RFC) and the Royal Naval Air Service (RNAS) were merged to form the Royal Air Force, and a week later, on the 7th, Hay gained his first victory when he and observer/gunner Sergeant P. A. Sherlock drove down an Albatros C 'out of control' over Grévillers. On 4 May he and Sherlock shot a Pfalz D.III down in flames over Marquion, and on 11 August, with 2nd Lieutenant E. J. Norris, he did the same to an Albatros D.V south of Péronne. On 26 August Hay was appointed a temporary captain while serving as a flight commander, and on 6 September, Hay and Lieutenant A. H. Craig destroyed and drove down two Fokker D.VIIs west of Cambrai.

Hay left the RAF after the war, being transferred to the unemployed list on 2 June 1919.

=== World War II ===
Hay returned to military service just prior to World War II, serving in an anti-aircraft unit of the Territorial Army. He was commissioned as a captain, and appointed administration officer of the 1/5th Battalion, Durham Light Infantry, on 23 March 1939. Hay relinquished his post of administration officer on 2 September, and on 1 August 1940 his unit was transferred and renamed, becoming the 54th Searchlight Regiment, Royal Artillery. He served throughout the war, finally relinquishing his commission, having exceeded the age limit, on 22 August 1945, and was granted the honorary rank of major. On 13 April 1951 he was awarded the Efficiency Decoration.
