= Joseph Michael John Moore =

British flying ace

- Born: Unknown
- Died: 27 April 1975
- Military career
- Allegiance: United Kingdom
- Branch: British Army; Royal Air Force
- Rank: Flight Lieutenant
- Unit: No. 48 Squadron RFC/RAF
- Conflicts: World War I; Western Front; World War II
- Awards: Military Cross

Flight Lieutenant Joseph Michael John Moore was a British World War I flying ace credited with eight aerial victories. He flew as a gunner/observer in two-seater fighters, garnering his wins while flying with three different pilots. He would return to military service for World War II.

== Early life ==
Moore's origins are unknown.

== World War I ==
Moore was appointed a flying officer (observer) on 31 January 1918, with seniority from 22 November 1917. He was also transferred to the General List of the Royal Flying Corps from his parent unit, the Cavalry Reserve Regiments. He began his victory string after being posted to No. 48 Squadron RFC.

=== List of aerial victories ===
No.	Date/time	Aircraft	Foe	Result	Location	Pilot
1	7 February 1918 approx. 0600 hours	Bristol F.2b Fighter	LVG reconnaissance plane	Destroyed	Le Catelet	Charles Napier.
2	8 March 1918 approx. 0600 hours	Bristol F.2 Fighter	DFW reconnaissance plane	Set afire; destroyed	Saint-Quentin	Charles Napier.
3	8 March 1918 approx. 0600 hours	Bristol F.2 Fighter	LVG reconnaissance plane	Driven down out of control		Charles Napier.
4	16 March 1918 approx. 0600 hours	Bristol F.2 Fighter	Albatros D.III	Driven down out of control		Charles Napier.
5	27 March 1918 @ 1120 hours	Bristol F.2 Fighter serial number C4886	Reconnaissance plane	Destroyed	Southwest of Roye	Charles Napier.
6	27 March 1918 @ 1120 hours	Bristol F.2 Fighter s/n C4886	Pfalz D.III	Driven down out of control	Southwest of Roye	Charles Napier.
7	27 March 1918 @ 1520 hours	Bristol F.2 Fighter s/n C4628	LVG reconnaissance plane	Destroyed	Morlancourt	Frank Ransley
8	23 April 1918 @ 1550 hours	Bristol F.2 Fighter s/n B1126	Pfalz D.III	Driven down out of control	West of Bray	Thomas Colville-Jones

== Post World War I ==
On 10 April 1919 Lieutenant J. M. J. Moore MC was transferred to the unemployed list of the Royal Air Force.

His name did not again appear in the historical record until Joseph Michael John Moore MC was granted a commission as a pilot officer on probation in the Royal Air Force Volunteer Reserve on 23 May 1939. Joseph Michael John Moore MC (service number 73468) was confirmed in his appointment and promoted to the rank of flying officer on 29 August 1939. On 16 December 1941, J. M. J. Moore (73468) was promoted from flying officer to temporary flight lieutenant. On 31 January 1945, Flying Officer (temporary Flight Lieutenant) J. M. J. Moore MC (73468) resigned his RAF commission. His fate after that remains unknown. Joseph Moore died on 27 April 1975 and there is a memorial plaque in remembrance in the graveyard of the Church of St Francis de Sales in the village of Yoxall in Staffordshire.
