= Frank Godfrey =

English World War I flying ace

- Born: 16 August 1889; Godalming, England
- Died: 11 August 1944 (aged 54); Surrey, England
- Military career
- Allegiance: United Kingdom
- Branch: British Army; Royal Air Force
- Rank: Captain
- Units: Middlesex Regiment; No. 20 Squadron RAF
- Awards: Distinguished Flying Cross

Captain Frank Godfrey DFC (16 August 1889 – 11 August 1944) was an English World War I flying ace credited with 12 victories. All his victories were achieved against German fighter aircraft.

== Early life and service ==
Frank Godfrey was born in 1889 in Godalming, Surrey. After schooling, he became an accountant and assistant secretary to his local alderman. He held these positions from 1902—1914.

Godfrey was commissioned as a second lieutenant in the 18th Battalion (1st Public Works Pioneers) of the Duke of Cambridge's Own (Middlesex Regiment) on 13 April 1915, His ground service would be with the 19th Battalion of that Regiment.

He gained promotion to captain on 17 March 1916. He transferred to the Royal Flying Corps, receiving a commission as an observer officer, with the rank of second lieutenant (honorary captain), on 27 April 1918.

== World War I aerial service ==
Godfrey was assigned to 20 Squadron on 3 March 1918 as an observer/gunner on Bristol F.2 Fighters. He manned the guns in the rear cockpit for Captain Thomas Percy Middleton when they scored double victories on 17 April, 3 May, and 8 May 1918. Godfrey scored five more wins in June, and a final victory over a German Fokker D.VII on 29 July 1918. His final tally was ten German fighters destroyed, and two driven down out of control. He was returned to Home Establishment in Britain on 22 September 1918.

Godfrey was awarded the Distinguished Flying Cross in August 1918. His citation read:

Temporary Captain Frank Godfrey (late Middlesex Regiment).

This officer has taken part in many offensive patrols. During recent operations he has accounted for eight enemy aeroplanes, proving himself at all times a skilful and bold airman.

== Postwar ==
Captain Frank Godfrey was discharged from military service on 25 April 1919.

== Bibliography ==
- Franks, Norman; Guest, Russell; Alegi, Gregory. Above the War Fronts: the British Two-seater Bomber Pilot and Observer Aces, the British Two-seater Fighter Observer Aces, and the Belgian, Italian, Austro-Hungarian and Russian Fighter Aces, 1914-1918: Volume 4 of Fighting Airmen of WWI Series: Volume 4 of Air Aces of WWI. Grub Street, 1997. ISBN 1898697566, 978189869756.
- Guttman, Jon (2007). Bristol F2 Fighter Aces of World War I: Volume 79 of Aircraft of the Aces. Osprey Publishing. ISBN 978-1-84603-201-1.
