= Maurice Benjamin =

Maurice Arthur Benjamin
- Born: 10 July 1883
- Military career
- Allegiance: England
- Branch: Royal Flying Corps
- Rank: Captain
- Unit: No. 48 Squadron RFC
- Awards: Military Cross

Captain Maurice Arthur Benjamin MC was a London born South African flying ace active during World War I. He was credited with eight aerial victories while serving as an observer/gunner in two-seater fighters.

== Early life ==
Maurice Arthur Benjamin was born in London on 10 July 1883. When World War I began, he was working as a theatrical manager in South Africa.

== World War I ==
Benjamin joined the Royal Flying Corps to serve in World War I. He began service as an aerial observer with 48 Squadron on 9 March 1917. He scored his first aerial victories on 6 and 9 April 1917 before being officially appointed as an observer on 11 April 1917. He would be credited with six more victories. As a result, he was awarded the Military Cross, gazetted 18 July 1917:

For conspicuous gallantry and devotion to duty. He helped to attack two large hostile machines, one of which was seen to crash to the ground. Previously he helped to engage three hostile scouts, one of which was destroyed and the remainder dispersed. He has helped to destroy four hostile machines in all.

He subsequently trained as a pilot, receiving Royal Aero Club certificate number 5883 on 3 February 1918. On 1 August 1918, he was promoted to temporary captain while on instructional duty with Home Establishment.

== List of aerial victories ==
See also Aerial victory standards of World War I

No.	Date/time	Aircraft	Foe	Result	Location	Notes
1	6 April 1917	Bristol F.2a Fighter	German airplane	Driven down out of control	Douai	Pilot: William Price
2	Morning of 9 April 1917	Bristol F.2a Fighter	German reconnaissance plane	Destroyed	East of Arras	Pilot: William Price
3	23 April 1917	Bristol F.2a Fighter	Albatros D.III	Driven down out of control	Vimy	Pilot: William Price. Victory shared with Roger Hay, Fred Holliday, at least three other aviators
4	25 April 1917	Bristol F.2a Fighter	Albatros D.III	Destroyed	East of Arras	Pilot: William Price
5	27 April 1917	Bristol F.2a Fighter	German reconnaissance plane	Destroyed	Vitry-en-Artois (Southwest of Douai)	Victory shared with Roger Hay
6	26 May 1917 @ 1945 hours	Bristol F.2b Fighter serial number A7119	Albatros D.III	Destroyed	Southwest of Douai	Pilot: J. W. Warren
7	26 May 1917 @ 1945 hours	Bristol F.2b Fighter serial number A7119	Albatros D.III	Driven down out of control	Southwest of Douai	Pilot: J. W. Warren
8	15 June 1917 @ 1940 hours	Bristol F.2b Fighter serial number A7117	Albatros D.III	Driven down out of control	Fampoux	Pilot: H.M Fraser. Victory shared with another air crew

== Post World War I ==
On 1 August 1919, Benjamin was granted a permanent commission as a lieutenant. Instead, he was put on the unemployed list of the Royal Air Force on 19 August 1919. His commission as lieutenant was cancelled on 5 September 1919.
