= Merkem =

- Deelgemeente
- Coordinates: 50°57′18″N 2°51′02″E
- Country: Belgium
- Province: West Flanders
- Municipality: Houthulst

Area
  - Total: 26.42 km^{2} (10.20 sq mi)

Population (2005)
  - Total: 2,245
  - Density: 85/km^{2} (220/sq mi)
- Source: NIS
- Postal code: 8650

Merkem is a town in the Belgian province West Flanders. It is a part (deelgemeente) of the municipality of Houthulst.

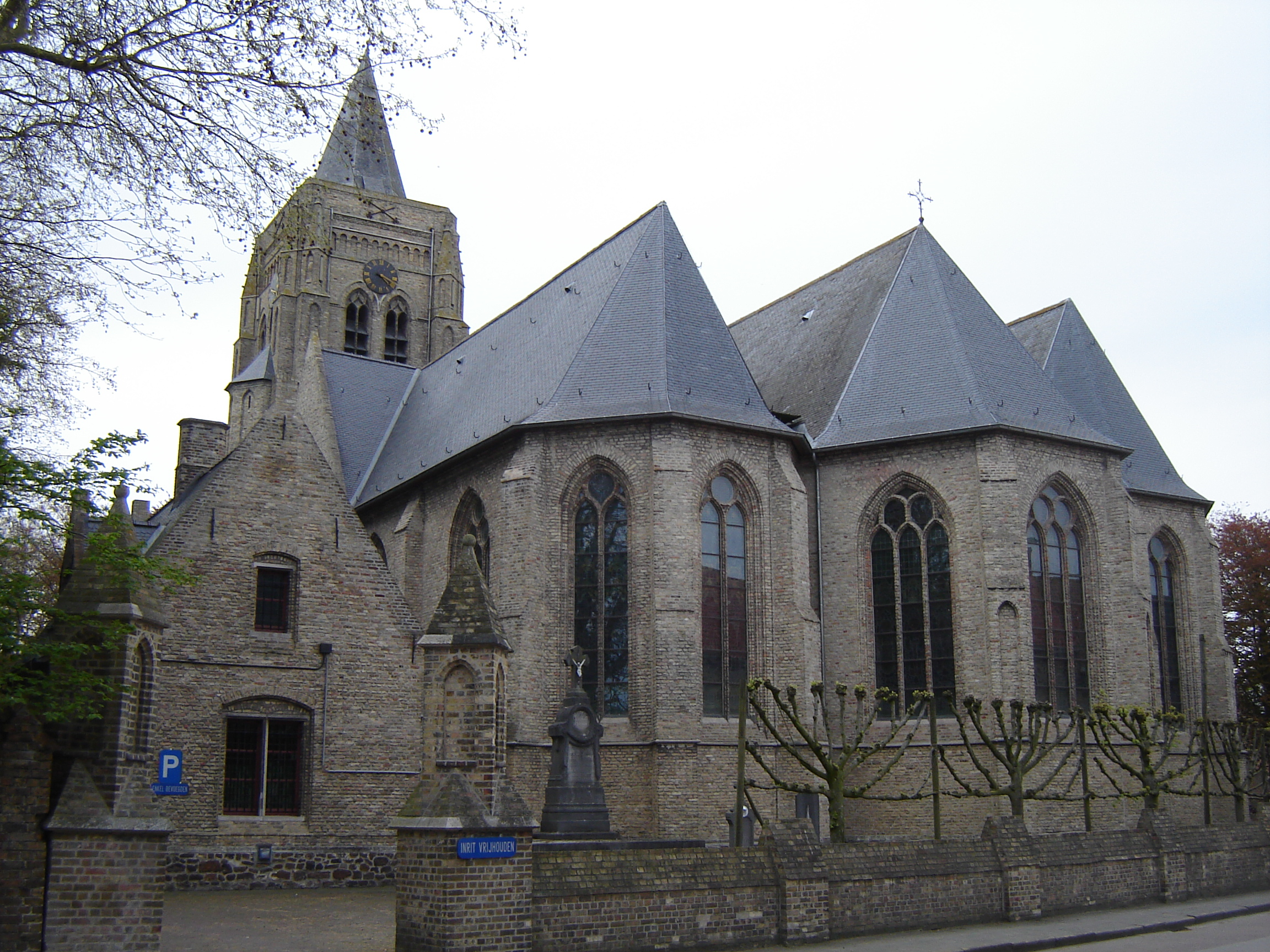
Church of Saint Bavo

== Notable people ==
- François Mabilla (1898-1918) died during the Battle of Merkem during the First World War.
