= Tom Rae =

New Zealand photographer

Tom Rae (born 2004 or 2005) is a New Zealand astro-photographer.

Born in 2004 or 2005, Rae is from Christchurch and studied at St Andrew's College. Rae has been interested in photography and astronomy since he was 13.

Rae was recognised in the Milky Way Photographer of the Year award in both 2023 and 2024. Rae won the Royal Observatory Greenwich’s ZWO Astronomy Photographer of the Year award in the Skyscapes category twice in a row, in 2024 and 2025.

Rae works with Nikon cameras that have been "astro-modified" to allow in wavelengths of light that would normally be filtered in camera optics.

Rae mostly works in the Aoraki Mackenzie International Dark Sky Reserve. Award-winning photos Tasman Gems (2024) and The Ridge (2025) were captured at Aoraki/Mount Cook National Park. Celestial Radiance (2023), which was recognised in that year's Milky Way Photographer of the Year award, was taken at Lake Tekapo.

Rae's photography has been published in National Geographic, The Guardian, Forbes and by NASA.
