= Thomas G. Rae =

Thomas Gillies Rae
- Born: 2 January 1886; Glasgow, Scotland
- Died: 22 June 1957 (aged 71); Cape Town, South Africa
- Military career
- Allegiance: United Kingdom
- Branch: Aviation
- Rank: Lieutenant
- Unit: No. 48 Squadron RAF
- Awards: Distinguished Flying Cross

Lieutenant Thomas Gillies Rae (2 January 1886 – 22 June 1957) was a Scottish World War I flying ace credited with six aerial victories. He served with the Royal Flying Corps during World War I and was awarded the Distinguished Flying Cross. He served in Flanders and in Europe. After the war he went to South West Africa and worked in the Administration, Public Works Department, where he later became senior inspector of works in Windhoek until 1945 when he retired to his farm in Grootfontein district. He died in Volka hospital in Cape Town on 22 June 1957 at the age of 72 years. Tribute has been paid to Mr Rae as having contributed a great deal to the development of the Territory. He was a capable officer and did much pioneer work in the South West. He was a great hunter, and in 1928 accompanied Prince Arthur, Duke of Connaught and Strathearn (third son of Queen Victoria and at the time the Governor General) on a three-week hunting trip covering 1,600 miles, and in 1926/7 accompanied the Governor General Alexander Cambridge, 1st Earl of Athlone (third son of Francis, Duke of Teck, brother of Mary of Teck, who was married to Princess Alice of Albany in 1904) on an elephant hunt in South Kaokoveld.

Mention must be made that "Tommy" was one of the finest all-round sportsmen that his country ever produced. He started competitive swimming at the age of 11 years, being the youngest to obtain the honour of holding the Western Province Diving Championships for several years undefeated. For five years he competed in the Currie Cup (inter provincial) with the Water Polo Teams (Johannesburg) and represented South Africa many times. He was an outstanding diver and swimmer and used to dive off the cranes at the Cape Town Docks. An outstanding football player, he played in the Currie Cup, Western Province Mother Country vs Colonial born and England vs Scotland. He was an undefeated featherweight boxing champion for four years ending in 1907 and was selected to go to England for trials but was unable due to work commitments and insufficient time to train. "Tommy" won countless other medals and prizes for running, walking, cricket, tennis, golf, billiards, horse riding and lifesaving (actual and theoretical)

Thomas Gillies Rae enlisted at the age of 16, served in the South African War with the Imperial Light Horse Campaign Regiment and then the Royal Flying Corps where he was awarded the D.F.C in France as a lone fighter pilot, being "cool, calm and fearless"

== His victories ==
Rae piloted a two-seater Bristol F.2 Fighter for 48 Squadron. In the month from 4 October to 4 November 1918, he defeated six Fokker D.VII fighters. One he had set on fire, four more were destroyed, and one was driven down out of control. At least four of these victories were credited to his front gun.
