= Thomas Percy Middleton =

English WWI fighter ace (1893–1961)

- Born: 10 May 1893; Earlsfield, Surrey
- Died: 13 January 1961 (aged 67)
- Military career
- Allegiance: British Empire
- Branch: Field Artillery, Air Service
- Rank: Captain
- Units: 6th London Brigade, Number 48 Squadron RFC, Number 20 Squadron RAF
- Awards: Distinguished Flying Cross

Captain Thomas Percy Middleton, DFC (10 May 1893 – 13 January 1961) was an English World War I fighter ace credited with 27 victories while flying a two seated fighter.

== Early life ==
Middleton was born in Earlsfield, Surrey, England, on 10 May 1893. He initially served in the 6th London Brigade of the Royal Field Artillery, but transferred to the Royal Flying Corps in 1916.

== First combat tour ==
His first tour of combat in fighters came in Number 48 Squadron of the Royal Flying Corps. This unit was the first supplied with the two seater Bristol F.2b fighter. Because either the pilot or the observer/gunner could fire upon enemy aircraft, both members of the flight crew would be credited with any victories on missions they flew together.

Middleton scored his first victory on 30 April 1917. He scored four more victories in May, in the vicinity of Douai, France, becoming an ace on the 27th with a double triumph. He scored twice more in June before being withdrawn from combat duty for a rest. Middleton's seven wins were achieved while teamed with three different gunners; one of them, Scotsman Alexander W. Merchant went on to become an ace in his own right.

== Second combat tour ==
Middleton returned for a second tour of combat duty on the Western Front as a flight leader in Number 48 Squadron of the newly founded Royal Air Force. He was still piloting Bristols. He reopened his victory list shortly after his return, on 17 April 1918, shooting down on Albatros D.V and driving another down out of control. He scored doubles on both the 3rd and the 8th. He then switched gunners, from Captain Frank Godfrey to British Lieutenant Alfred Stanley Mills. With Mills in the rear seat, Middleton ran off five more wins in May, ending the month with 18 victories. In June, Middleton switched back to Godfrey in the back seat, and scored five more victories, followed by another in July. On 3 August, Middleton was awarded one of the first Distinguished Flying Crosses.

There was a lapse in victories until September; then Middleton resumed with Mills once again teaming as his gunner. Middleton and Mills shot a Hannover C down in flames on 15 September, followed by two Fokker D.VIIs destroyed on 20 September.

Middleton was the fourth highest scorer of the 44 aces in 48 Squadron. His 27 victories came overwhelmingly over German fighter planes; only three of his wins were over enemy reconnaissance craft. Three of the observer/gunners he had teamed with became aces in their own right; Merchant with 8 wins, Mills with 15, and Godfrey with all 12 of his victories won from Middleton's rear seat.

== Postwar life ==
After the war, Middleton emigrated to Argentina.
