= Méricourt-sur-Somme =

- Part of Étinehem-Méricourt
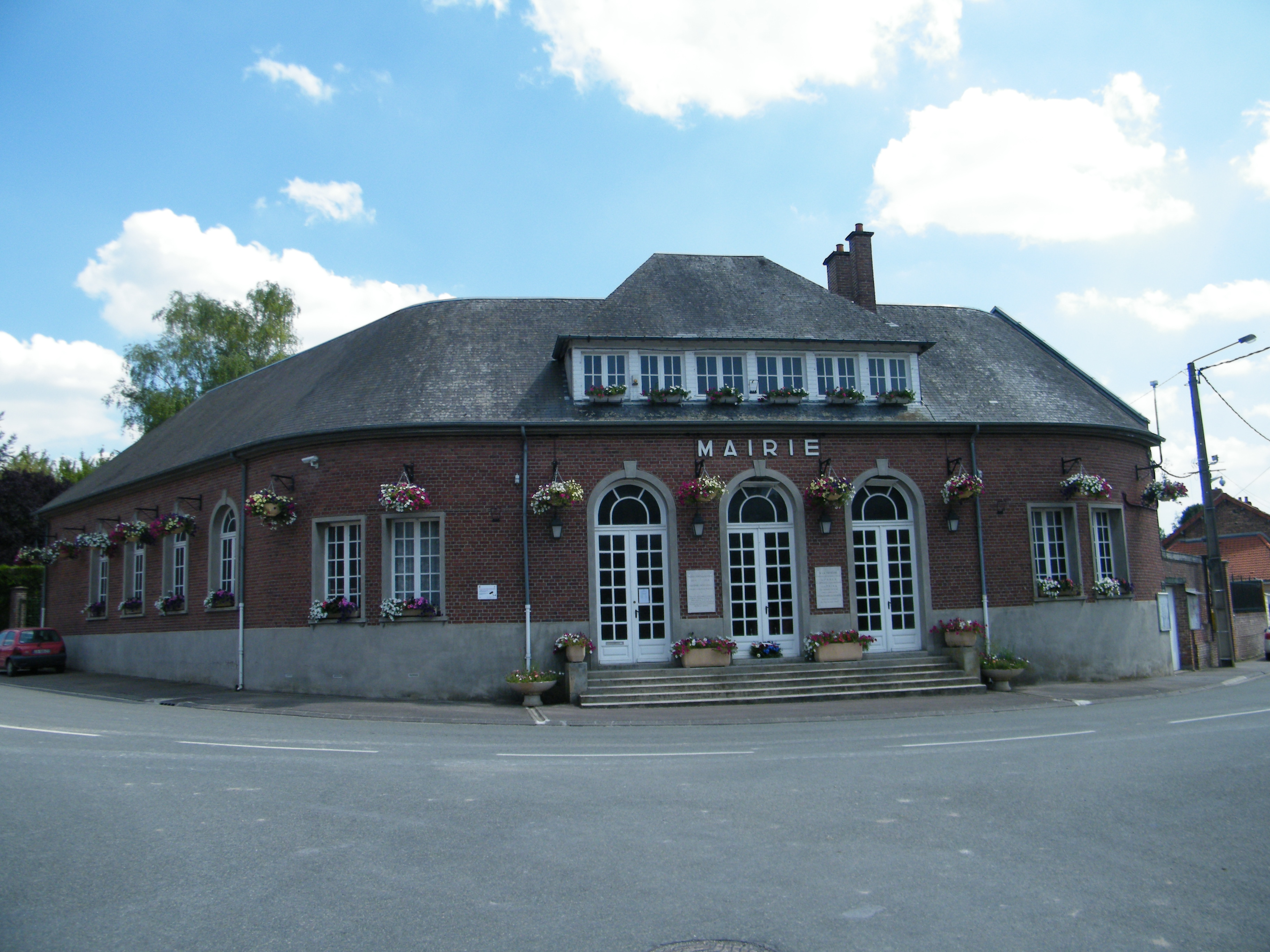
- Location of Méricourt-sur-Somme
- Location within France Location within Hauts-de-France
- Coordinates: 49°54′23″N 2°40′30″E
- Country: France
- Region: Hauts-de-France
- Department: Somme
- Arrondissement: Péronne
- Canton: Albert
- Commune: Étinehem-Méricourt
- Area^{1}: 7.14 km^{2} (2.76 sq mi)
- Elevation: 35 m (115 ft)
- Highest elevation: 92 m (302 ft)
- Lowest elevation: 32 m (105 ft)
- Population (2022): 213
  - Density: 29.8/km^{2} (77.3/sq mi)
- Time zone: UTC+01:00 (CET)
  - Summer (DST): UTC+02:00 (CEST)
- Postal code: 80340
- ^{1} French Land Register data, which excludes lakes, ponds, glaciers > 1 km^{2} (0.386 sq mi or 247 acres) and river estuaries.

Méricourt-sur-Somme (French pronunciation: [meʁikuʁ syʁ sɔm], literally Méricourt on Somme; Picard: Méricourt-su-Sonme) is a former commune in the Somme department in Hauts-de-France in northern France. On 1 January 2017, it was merged into the new commune Étinehem-Méricourt.

== Geography ==
The commune is situated on the D171 road, some 13 miles (21 km) east of Amiens, by the banks of the Somme River.

== Population ==
Historical population
Year	Pop.	±% p.a.
1962	194	—
1968	173	−1.89%
1975	147	−2.30%
1982	153	+0.57%
1990	140	−1.10%
1999	164	+1.77%
2006	164	+0.00%
Source: EHESS

== See also ==
- Communes of the Somme department
