= Bailleulval =

- Commune
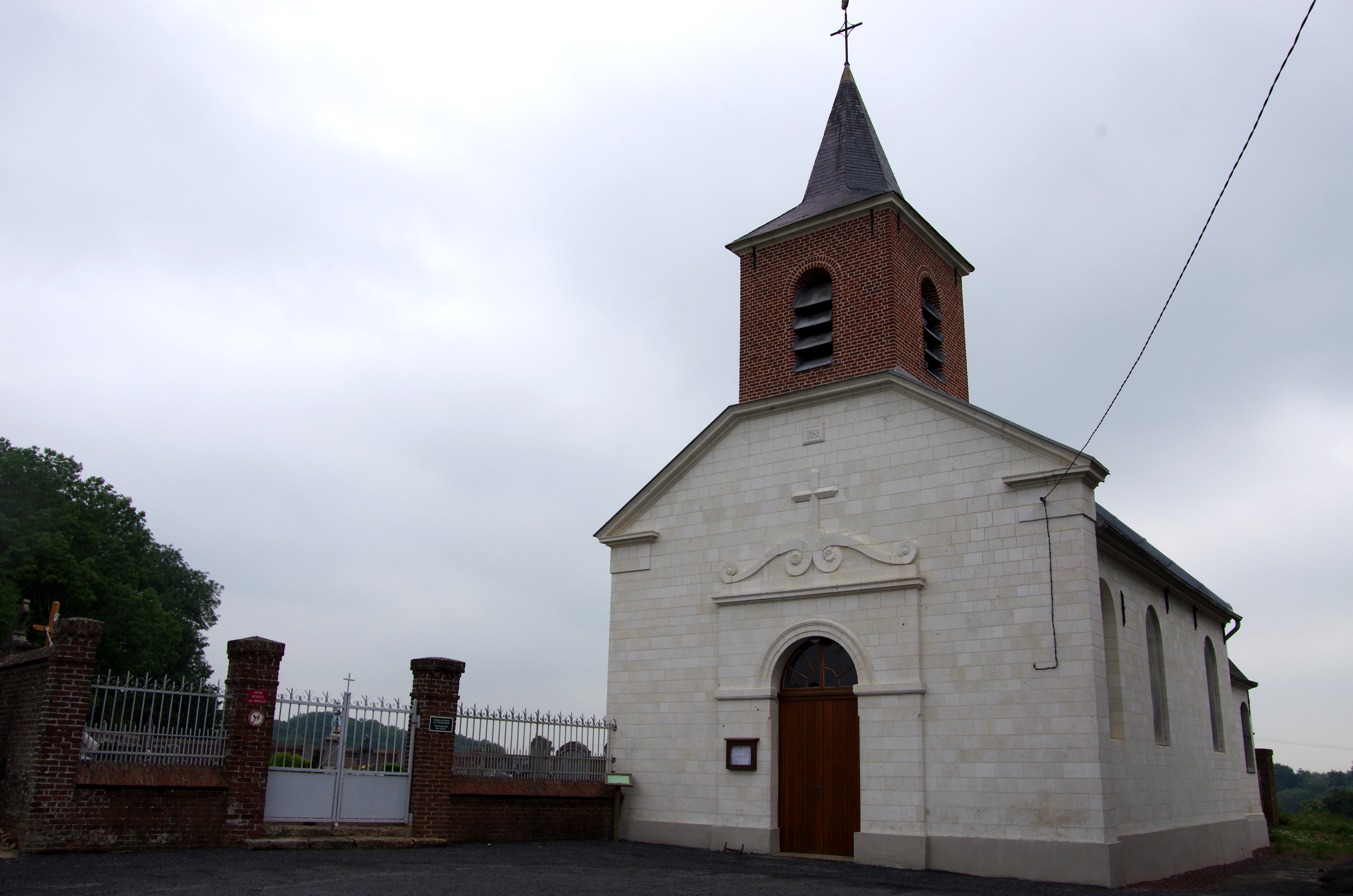
- The church of Bailleulval

- Coat of arms
- Location of Bailleulval
- Location within France Location within Hauts-de-France
- Coordinates: 50°13′20″N 2°38′07″E
- Country: France
- Region: Hauts-de-France
- Department: Pas-de-Calais
- Arrondissement: Arras
- Canton: Avesnes-le-Comte
- Intercommunality: CC Campagnes de l'Artois

Government
  - Mayor (2020–2026): Harold Tetu
- Area^{1}: 3.90 km^{2} (1.51 sq mi)
- Highest elevation: 152 m (499 ft)
- Lowest elevation: 101 m (331 ft)
- Population (2023): 237
  - Density: 60.8/km^{2} (157/sq mi)
- Time zone: UTC+01:00 (CET)
  - Summer (DST): UTC+02:00 (CEST)
- INSEE/Postal code: 62074 /62123
- ^{1} French Land Register data, which excludes lakes, ponds, glaciers > 1 km^{2} (0.386 sq mi or 247 acres) and river estuaries.

Bailleulval (French pronunciation: [bajœlval]) is a commune in the Pas-de-Calais department in the Hauts-de-France region of France.

== Geography ==
A farming village located 9 miles (14 km) southwest of Arras on the D1 road. The small river Crinchon passes through the commune. Canadian forces were billetted here during World War I. 9th (Service) Battalion Devonshire Regiment also billeted here during WW1. 19 August 1917 was Battalion Sports Day.

== Population ==
Historical population
| Year | Pop. | ±% p.a. |
|---|---|---|
| 1968 | 255 | — |
| 1975 | 240 | −0.86% |
| 1982 | 259 | +1.09% |
| 1990 | 273 | +0.66% |
| 1999 | 272 | −0.04% |
| 2007 | 269 | −0.14% |
| 2012 | 264 | −0.37% |
| 2017 | 240 | −1.89% |
| 2023 | 237 | −0.21% |
Source: INSEE

== Sights ==
- The church of St. Martin, dating from the eighteenth century.
- The vestiges of a 13th-century castle.
- British graves from World War I.

== See also ==
- Communes of the Pas-de-Calais department
