= No. 48 Squadron RAF =

Defunct flying squadron of the Royal Air Force

- Active: 15 April 1916 – 1 April 1920; 25 Nov 1935 – 7 Jan 1976
- Country: United Kingdom
- Branch: Royal Air Force
- Mottos: Latin: Forte et fidele ("By strength and faithfulness")
- Battle honours: Western Front, 1917-18: Arras: Channel & North Sea, 1939-40: Dunkirk: Atlantic, 1941-42: Mediterranean, 1943: Arnhem: Rhine: All honours are emblazoned on the Squadron Standard

Commanders
- Notable commanders: Keith Park

Insignia
- Squadron badge heraldry: On an equilateral triangle, a Petrel's head erased
- Squadron codes: ZW Allocated Apr 1939 - Sep 1939; OY Sep 1939 - Dec 1942; I2 Feb 1944 - Jan 1946

No. 48 Squadron was a Royal Air Force squadron that saw service in both the First and Second World Wars.

== History ==
=== First World War ===
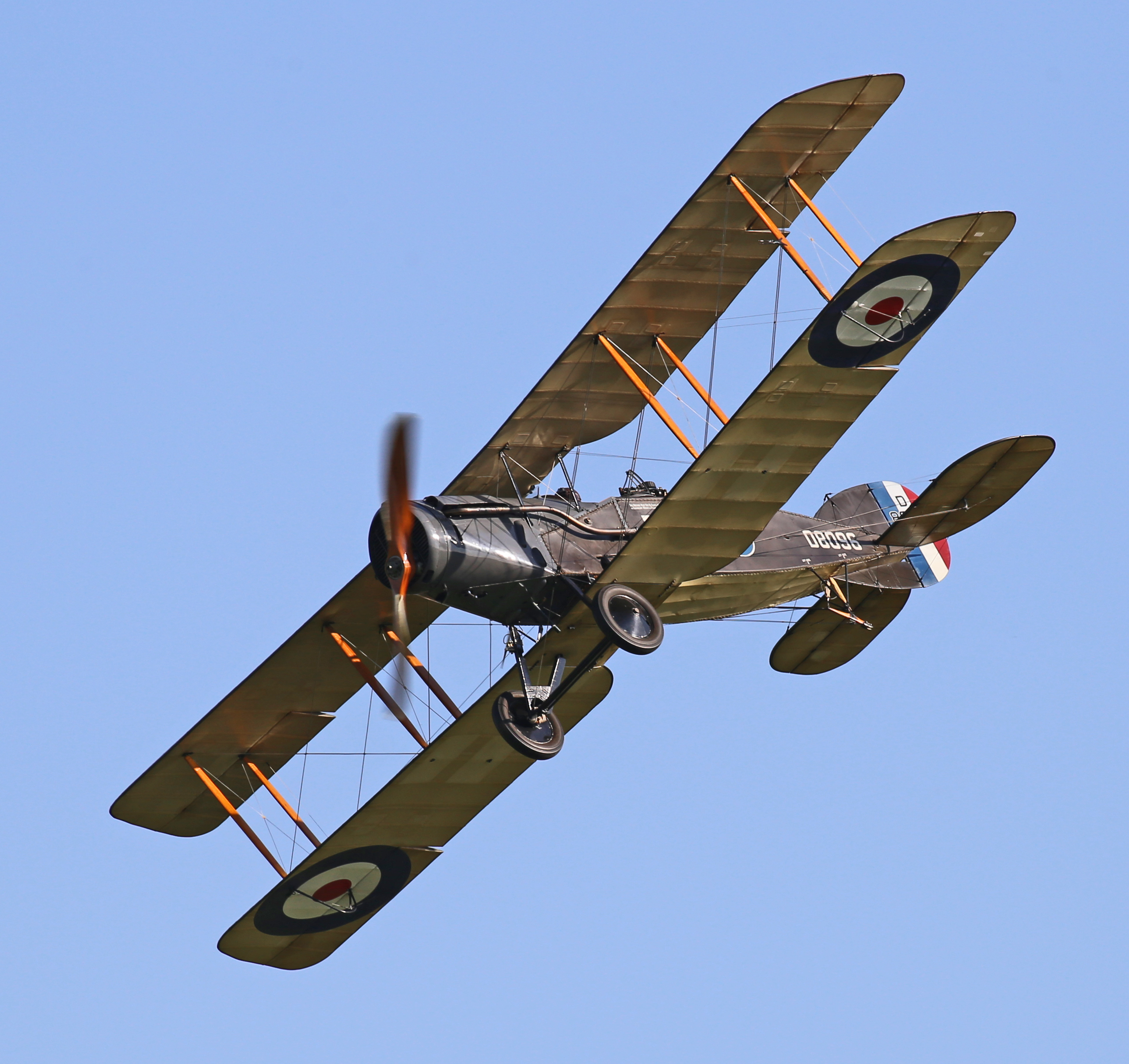
First World War era Bristol Fighter of the Shuttleworth Collection

No. 48 Squadron of the Royal Flying Corps was formed at Netheravon, Wiltshire, on 15 April 1916. The squadron was posted to France in March 1917 and became the first fighter squadron to be equipped with the Bristol Fighter. One of the squadron's commanders was Keith Park, then a Major, who later led No. 11 Group of Fighter Command during the Battle of Britain as an Air Vice Marshal. The squadron became part of the Royal Air Force when the Royal Flying Corps merged with the Royal Naval Air Service in 1918. It moved by sea to India during May/June 1919, being based at Quetta. On 1 April 1920 the squadron was disbanded by renumbering it to No. 5 Squadron.

The squadron had 32 aces serve in it. Besides Park, they included: Fred Holliday, John Letts, Brian Edmund Baker, Harold Anthony Oaks, Leonard A. PayneRobert Dodds, John Theobald Milne, Charles Napier, Frank Ransley, Alan Wilkinson, Thomas Percy Middleton, William Price, future Air Marshal Charles Steele, Norman Craig Millman, Thomas G. Rae, Owen Scholte, Harold Johnstone Pratt, Hugh Leslie Owen, Roger Hay, Norman Roberts, Joseph Michael John Moore, Arthur Noss and Maurice Benjamin.

=== Second World War ===
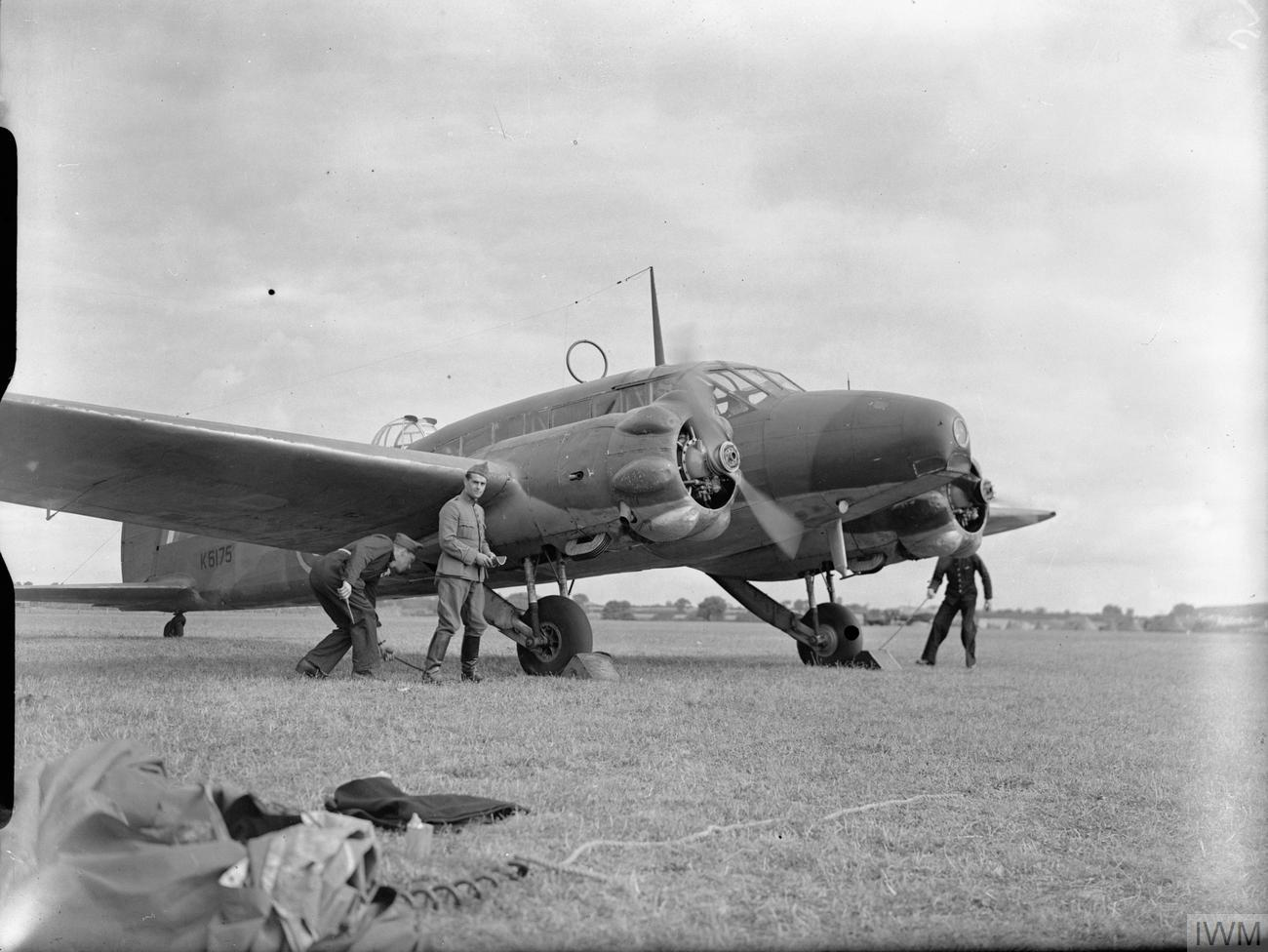
Avro Anson used by 48 Squadron, RAF Coastal Command

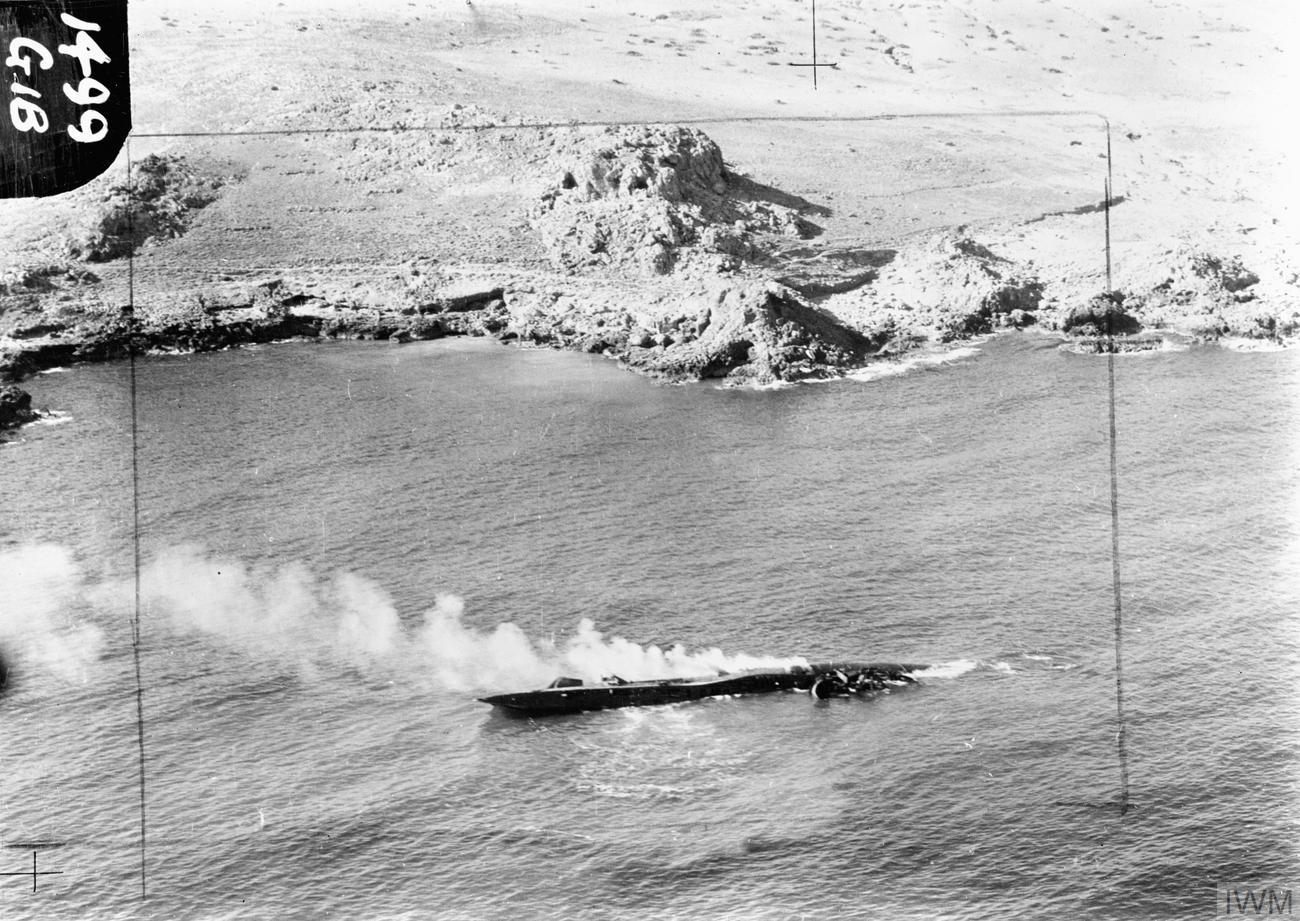
Photo taken by a 48 Squadron Lockheed Hudson, showing U-617, on fire and lying on her side beached near the Moroccan coast, after attacks by aircraft from RAF Gibraltar, 12 Sept 1943.

The squadron reformed on 25 November 1935 at RAF Bicester, and became a General Reconnaissance unit operating Avro Anson aircraft. It moved into RAF Coastal Command on 14 July 1936. With the outbreak of war in 1939 the squadron was engaged in coastal patrols along the south coast of England. In 1941 the squadron re-equipped with Lockheed Hudson aircraft and took on the role of an anti-submarine squadron, patrolling first the North Sea; in December 1942 the squadron moved to RAF Gibraltar to patrol the Mediterranean.

In 1944 the squadron returned to the UK and was re-equipped with Douglas Dakota aircraft. It remained a transport squadron until being disbanded on 16 January 1946. During this period it operated from Chittagong, Bengal, India on supply operations in the Irrawaddy valley of Burma.

=== Post war ===
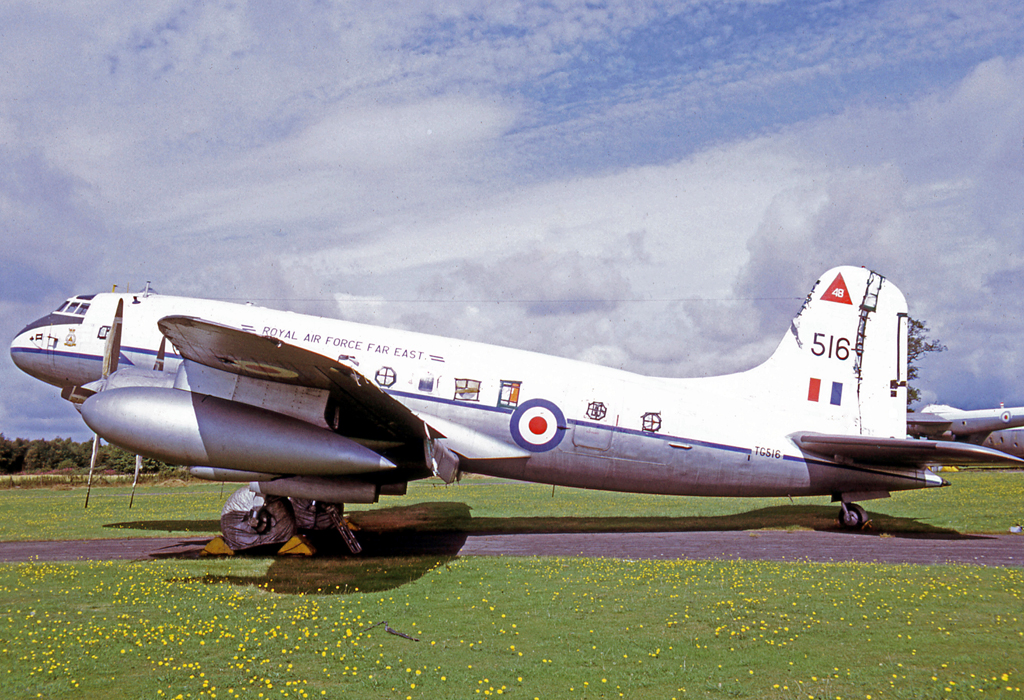
Handley Page Hastings C.1 TG516 in 1971, after three years in storage, still wearing RAF Far East titles and 48 Squadron's red triangle symbol.

The squadron reformed again on 15 February 1946 when No. 215 Squadron was renumbered as No. 48. The base was at RAF Changi, Singapore, from April 1946 until October 1967. It was re-equipped with Vickers Valetta transports in January 1951 and these were replaced by Handley Page Hastings four-engine transport aircraft in June 1957. The squadron remained a transport unit for the remainder of its existence, flying the Hastings until it was replaced with the turboprop Lockheed C-130 Hercules in 1968. The squadron returned to the UK on 1 September 1971, continuing to operate the Hercules until disbandment at RAF Lyneham on 7 January 1976.

== Badge ==
The badge of the squadron is "On an equilateral triangle, a Petrel's head erased". In the First World War, airmen would often stick bottle labels to their aircraft and so the Bass red triangle – the first registered UK trademark – was incorporated as the main part of the badge with the head of a petrel – a small seabird.
