= Fred Parkinson Holliday =

Australian-born Canadian fighter pilot

- Born: 20 February 1888; Melbourne, Victoria, Australia
- Died: 5 March 1960 (aged 72); Canada
- Military career
- Allegiance: United Kingdom; Canada
- Branch: Canadian Army; Royal Flying Corps; Royal Air Force; Royal Canadian Air Force
- Rank: Group captain
- Conflicts: World War I World War II
- Awards: Distinguished Service Order; Military Cross; Air Force Cross

Fred Parkinson Holliday, DSO, MC, AFC (20 February 1888 – 5 March 1960), was an Australian-born Canadian fighter pilot and ace of the First World War. He shot down 17 German aircraft between his entry into the war and its end, making him the 11th highest-scoring Australian-born pilot of the war. He served with the Royal Flying Corps and Royal Air Force throughout, in the No. 48 Squadron. He was awarded the Military Cross on 26 July 1917 for a particularly successful encounter with five German aircraft, and was later given the Distinguished Service Order.

Born in Fitzroy, Victoria, to parents from Yorkshire, as a youth Holliday was sent to Britain to complete his schooling, attending grammar school in Brighton. He served in the Sussex Yeomanry for three years, but after completing further studies in electrical and mechanical engineering moved to Canada. In September 1914, he enlisted in the Canadian Expeditionary Force as a sapper in the Canadian Engineers. He was appointed a temporary second lieutenant in December 1915, and he subsequently transferred to the RFC, serving first as an observer and then as a pilot.

Holliday survived the war and, after working briefly in Sweden, he returned to Canada. He saw further service in the Royal Canadian Air Force during the Second World War, reaching the rank of group captain. From 1947 until his death in 1960, he served as president of Swedish Electric in Canada. He died at the age of 72.

== Awards and honours ==
- 26 July 1917 – Temp. Lt. Fred Parkinson Holliday, Gen. List and RFC is awarded the Military Cross For conspicuous gallantry and devotion to duty. In company with another pilot he attacked five hostile aircraft, setting one on fire, driving down another out of control, and dispersing the remainder. He has previously done fine work, bringing down eight hostile machines in all.
- 25 August 1917 – T./Lt. Fred Parkinson Holliday, Gen. List and RFC is awarded the Distinguished Service Order – For conspicuous gallantry and devotion to duty. By his initiative and skilful manoeuvring he led six hostile machines to an encounter with our own formation, during which five out of the six hostile machines were destroyed and driven down. He had been equally successful the day before in misleading hostile aircraft, and his originality and fearless example were of the greatest value to his squadron.
- 30 May 1919 – Capt. (A./Maj.) Fred Parkinson Holliday, DSO, MC (Can. Eng) is awarded the Air Force Cross.
