= RAE Hurricane =

Hurricane

General information
- Type: Sports aircraft
- National origin: United Kingdom
- Manufacturer: Royal Aircraft Establishment Aero Club
- Designer: Samuel Childs
- Number built: 1

History
- First flight: mid-1923
- Retired: 1926

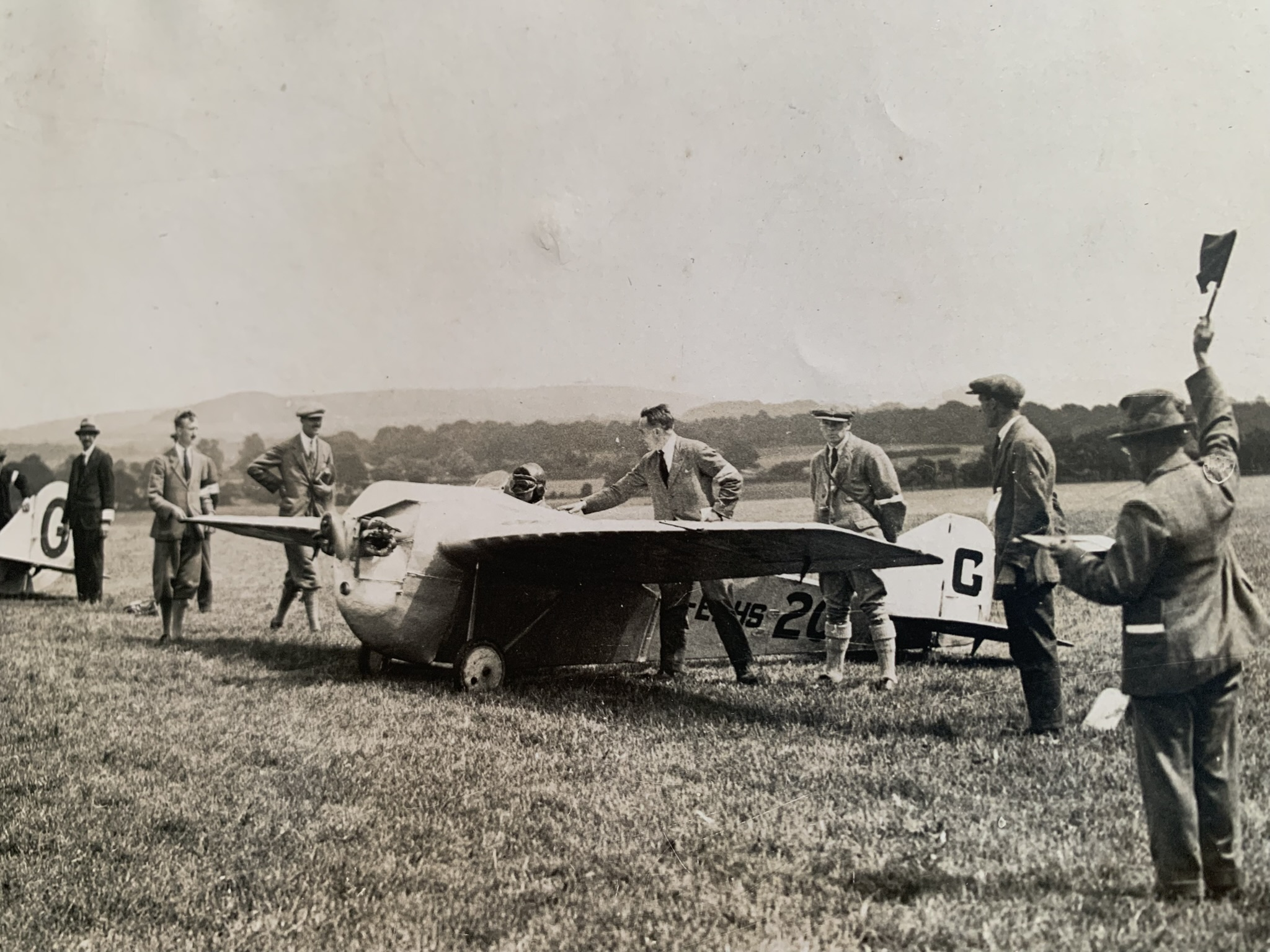
John Chick flying the RAE Hurricane

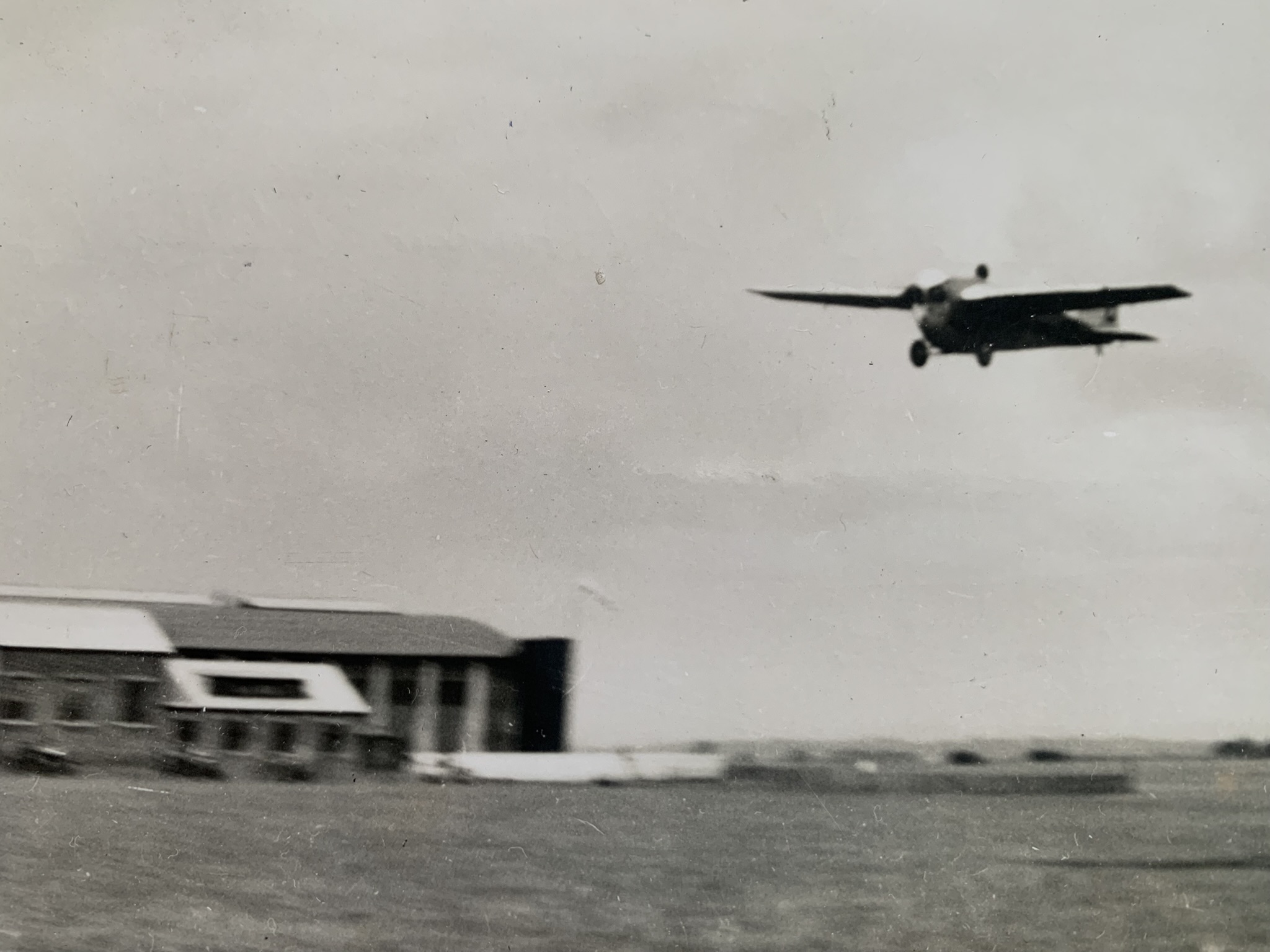
John Chick and the RAE Hurricane mid-flight

The RAE Hurricane was a single-seat, single-engined light monoplane designed and built by the Aero Club of the Royal Aircraft Establishment for the 1923 Lympne Motor Glider Competition. It was underpowered with an unreliable engine. Re-engined, it flew in many races, with first place in the 1925 Grosvenor Challenge Cup its greatest success.

== Design and development ==
Amongst the many aircraft designed and built for the Lympne light aircraft competitions of the mid-1920s, the RAE Hurricane and the Cranwell CLA.2 had one other thing in common. Both were product of amateur groups formed within government funded aeronautical establishments, the Royal Aircraft Establishment at Farnborough and the Cranwell RAF College. The Hurricane was built for speed and flew in the 1923 Lympne Motor Glider Competition, the CLA.2 for durability, flying in the two-seater competition the following year.

The Hurricane was a wooden framed, fabric covered shoulder wing monoplane. The wing was a two spar cantilever structure, made possible by the adoption of one of the novel thick Göttingen airfoil sections. It was tapered, but almost entirely on the trailing edge and with clipped wingtips. Seen in plan, the wing of the Hurricane looked much a late 20th-century light aircraft. The competition rules required that aircraft could access suitable fields via a farm gate, and many met this condition with folding wings. The Hurricane's designer, Samuel Childs chose instead to make its wings easily detachable after removing eight bolts per side.

The fuselage of the Hurricane was in contrast very much of its time, built up on two upper longerons and a strongly curved keel, producing a structure that was narrow and almost parallel in plan and a thin triangle in cross section, deepest between engine and the wing leading edge, tapering rapidly aft. The single-seat open cockpit was at mid-chord, between the spars. The main undercarriage was a pair of fabric covered motorcycle type wire wheels mounted at the ends of a horizontal leaf spring fixed to the keel and braced to the fuselage with a pair of V-struts, with the result that the Hurricane sat very close to the ground. At the rear the empennage was conventional, with a broad chord fin bearing an unbalanced rudder that extended between split elevators to the keel. Initially the tailplane leading edge was curved and merged into the curved elevator tips.

Forward of the wing, the fuselage tapered rapidly, mostly through the upward bend of the keel. Because the 600 cc Douglas flat twin engine used in the 1923 aircraft was geared down 2:1 via a front-mounted chain drive that put the propeller shaft at the top of the motor, it was mounted low and to the rear of the nose, with cylinders exposed for cooling. The output of this engine was only 21.5 hp (16 kW).

Several changes were made during 1924. The Douglas engine was replaced with a 32 hp (24 kW) Bristol Cherub II flat twin. This more powerful motor was also lighter, lacking the reduction gear of the Douglas and therefore mounted in the extreme nose with propeller and exposed cylinders at wing level. At about the same time the empennage was modified with a squarer tailplane, taller, less rounded fin and square tipped rudder. The leaf spring undercarriage was replaced with a lighter split axle unit carrying smaller wheels and braced with conspicuous V-struts to the wing roots. There were also modifications to the top of the fuselage, including the installation of a side hinged cockpit cover with an opening just large enough to allow the pilot's head to protrude.

== Operational history ==
Only one Hurricane was built, registered G-EBHS. Since the Lympne trials were in October, the Hurricane must have made its first light in the late summer of 1923, probably piloted by George Bulman. At the trials, with Bulman at the controls it flew rather tail down, suggesting trim and wing incidence issues had not been sorted. Compared with some other competitors it was overweight; like many others it suffered from an unreliable engine. Worst, it was slow; it had been entered specifically for the Abdullah speed prize and there had been talk of speeds near 100 mph, but the best it could do was 58.5 mph (94 km/h) before retiring with a broken rocker arm. The winner of this £500 prize was the Parnall Pixie II at 76.1 mph.

As a single-seater, the Hurricane did not qualify for the 1924 Lympne Two-seater Dual Control Light Aeroplane Competition, but flew in the Grosvenor Challenge Cup immediately afterwards, now powered with the Cherub engine. The extra power produced a speed of about 80 mph, but it failed at just past the half way stage. Its most successful meeting was at Lympne in August 1925, flown by John Chick where it won the light Plane Holiday Handicap, the Private Owners Race and, most prestigiously the eight lap, 100 mile (161 km) Grosvenor Challenge Cup, averaging 81.2 mph (131 km/h). In total, the Hurricane picked up £300 in prizes at that meeting. It was flown by Chick in its last Grosvenor Cup in 1926; although it was faster than before (84.8 mph or 136 km/h), it only managed third place. It was broken up later that year.

== Specifications (Cherub powered) ==
Data from Ord-Hume 2000, p. 455

General characteristics

- Crew: 1
- Length: 17 ft 8 in (5.38 m)
- Wingspan: 23 ft 0 in (7.01 m)
- Height: 4 ft 7 in (1.40 m)
- Wing area: 80 sq ft (7.4 m^{2})
- Empty weight: 350 lb (159 kg)
- Gross weight: 550 lb (249 kg)
- Powerplant: 1 × Bristol Cherub II flat twin, 32 hp (24 kW)

Performance

- Maximum speed: 85 mph (137 km/h, 74 kn)
- Cruise speed: 64 mph (103 km/h, 56 kn)
