= Hawker Heron =

Heron

General information
- Type: Biplane fighter
- National origin: United Kingdom
- Manufacturer: Hawker Aircraft
- Status: Prototype
- Number built: 1

History
- First flight: 1925

The Hawker Heron was the first fighter aircraft designed at Hawker Aircraft with a basically metal structure. Sydney Camm was the chief designer that introduced what became the typical structure for all Hawker aircraft until the introduction of the jet-powered Hawker P.1040. This structure consisted of metal tubes (steel or aluminium) with their ends swaged so that they could be connected to each other by means of "fishplates" and bolts (sometimes with ferrules to protect the tubes).

== Design ==
The design was produced in 1924 as a private venture version of the Hawker Woodcock fighter with the wooden structure of the Woodcock replaced by a mainly metal structure, but as the design developed, the use of a metal structure resulted in an entirely new aircraft.

The Heron was a single bay biplane with a metal structure as described above and fabric covered. It was powered by a 455 hp (339 kW) Bristol Jupiter VI engine driving a two-bladed wooden propeller. (A metal propeller was also flown but showed no improvement of performance). There was provision for two .303 in (7.7 mm) Vickers machine guns.

The Air Ministry issued Specification 25/24 to Hawker for a single-seat high-speed fighter landplane and a prototype was ordered for evaluation. The first flight of the prototype, serial number J6989, flown by P.S.W. Bulman was made in 1925. Despite being heavier than the similar powered Woodcock, it was 15 mph (24 km/h) faster and was praised by the pilots that flew it for its excellent handling properties. Due to little interest from the Air Ministry, only one aircraft was built and it was returned to Hawker after testing.

== Specifications ==
Data from Hawker Aircraft since 1919

General characteristics

- Crew: 1
- Length: 22 ft 3 in (6.78 m)
- Wingspan: 31 ft 10 in (9.70 m)
- Height: 9 ft 9 in (2.97 m)
- Wing area: 291 sq ft (27.0 m^{2})
- Empty weight: 2,120 lb (962 kg)
- Gross weight: 3,126 lb (1,418 kg)
- Fuel capacity: 60 imp gal (72 US gal; 270 L)
- Powerplant: 1 × Bristol Jupiter VI radial engine, 455 hp (339 kW)
- Propellers: 2-bladed Watts wooden propeller

Performance

- Maximum speed: 156 mph (251 km/h, 136 kn) at 9,800 ft (3,000 m)
- Endurance: 3 hr 30 min
- Service ceiling: 23,200 ft (7,100 m)
- Time to altitude: 5 min 30 s to 10,000 ft (3,000 m)

Armament

- Guns: 2 × .303 in (7.7 mm) Vickers machine guns

== See also ==
Related development

- Hawker Woodcock
