= Reginald Makepeace =

British World War I flying ace

Reginald Milburn Makepeace
- Born: 27 December 1890; Darlington, County Durham, England
- Died: 28 May 1918 (aged 27); Turnberry, Ayrshire, Scotland
- Burial place: Anfield Cemetery, Liverpool; 53°26′20″N 2°57′30″W
- Military career
- Allegiance: United Kingdom
- Branch: British Army; Royal Air Force
- Service years: 1916–1918
- Rank: Lieutenant
- Units: No. 22 Squadron RFC; No. 11 Squadron RFC
- Conflicts: World War I; Western Front
- Awards: Military Cross

Lieutenant Reginald Milburn Makepeace MC (27 December 1890 – 28 May 1918) was a British World War I flying ace credited with 17 aerial victories.

== Early life and background ==
Makepeace was born in Darlington, County Durham, the son of John P. Makepeace, a printer and compositor, and Mary A. Makepeace (née Milburn). The family emigrated to Canada in 1905, eventually settling in Montreal where Makepeace worked for the Canadian Pacific Railway.

== World War I flying service ==
Makepeace was commissioned as a second lieutenant (on probation) in the Royal Flying Corps on 17 November 1916, and was assigned to No. 20 Squadron as a pilot flying a Royal Aircraft Factory FE.2d on 8 June 1917.

He scored his first victory on 29 June 1917, with Lieutenant Melville Waddington as his observer gunner, and gained his second on 6 July, before his period of probation was over, as he was not confirmed in his rank until 12 July. Makepeace triumphed six more times in the FE.2d, including a triple victory on the evening of 27 July, with his eighth win coming on 17 August 1917. His squadron was then re-equipped with the Bristol F.2 Fighter, and he and Waddington were the first to score with the new aircraft when they shot down an Albatros D.V in flames on 3 September. He would score seven more times flying the Bristol, gaining his sixteenth win on 4 January 1918. For his seventeenth and final victory on 28 January 1918 he flew as observer/gunner for pilot Second Lieutenant John Stanley Chick of No. 11 Squadron.

Makepeace was awarded the Military Cross on 26 September 1917, which was gazetted on 9 January 1918. His citation read:

Second Lieutenant Reginald Milburn Makepeace, Royal Flying Corps, Special Reserve.

"For conspicuous gallantry and devotion to duty whilst on an offensive patrol. He and his gunner shot down three enemy aircraft in quick succession, having attacked a large hostile formation, about twenty in number, with great dash and determination."

Makepeace was serving as an instructor at the No. 1 School of Aerial Fighting and Gunnery, based at Turnberry Aerodrome, on 28 May 1918 when the wings of his Bristol F2b fighter folded up in flight, and Makepeace and his crewman Second Lieutenant Thomas Albert McClure were both killed. He is buried at Anfield Cemetery, Liverpool.

== Combat record ==
List of aerial victories
No.	Date Time	Aircraft Serial No.	Opponent	Result	Location	Notes
1	29 June 1917 @ 1330	F.E.2d (A6498)	Albatros D.III	Driven down 'out of control'	Houthem	Observer: Lieutenant Melville Waddington
2	6 July 1917 @ 1830	F.E.2d (A6457)	Albatros D.III	Driven down 'out of control'	Comines	Observer: Second Lieutenant W. D. Kennard
3	27 July 1917 @ 1945-2040	F.E.2d (A6458)	Albatros D.III	Destroyed (in flames)	Menen	Observer: Private S. Pilbrow
4	27 July 1917 @ 1945-2040	F.E.2d (A6458)	Albatros D.III	Driven down 'out of control'	Polygon Wood	Observer: Private S. Pilbrow
5	27 July 1917 @ 1945-2040	F.E.2d (A6458)	Albatros D.III	Driven down 'out of control'	South of Polygon Wood	Observer: Private S. Pilbrow
6	28 July 1917 @ 0920	F.E.2d (A1956)	Albatros D.III	Driven down 'out of control'	Kezelberg	Observer: Private S. Pilbrow
7	16 August 1917 @ 0905	F.E.2d (A3)	Albatros D.V	Driven down 'out of control'	Zonnebeke	Observer: Lieutenant Melville Waddington. Shared with Second Lieutenants William Durrand Jr. & J. P. Flynn.
8	17 August 1917 @ 2000	F.E.2d (B1897)	Albatros D.V	Driven down 'out of control'	East of Polygon Wood	Observer: Gunner J. McMechan
9	3 September 1917 @ 1010	Bristol F.2b (B7214)	Albatros D.V	Destroyed (in flames)	Menen-Wervik	Observer: Lieutenant Melville Waddington
10	5 September 1917 @ 1117	Bristol F.2b (B7203)	Albatros D.V	Driven down 'out of control'	West of Lille	Observer: Lieutenant Melville Waddington
11	11 September 1917 @ 1400	Bristol F.2b (B7214)	Albatros D.V	Driven down 'out of control'	East of Menen	Observer: Lieutenant Melville Waddington
12	17 October 1917 @ 0840-0905	Bristol F.2b (B7255)	Albatros D.V	Driven down 'out of control'	Zonnebeke	Observer: Lieutenant Melville Waddington
13	17 October 1917 @ 0840-0905	Bristol F.2b (B7255)	Albatros D.V	Driven down 'out of control'	North-East of Zonnebeke	Observer: Lieutenant Melville Waddington
14	15 November 1917 @ 1500	Bristol F.2b (B7193)	Albatros D.V	Driven down 'out of control'	Moorslede	Observer: Second Lieutenant W. T. V. Harmer
15	22 December 1917 @ 1415	Bristol F.2b (B7255)	Albatros D.V	Destroyed	Moorslede	Observer: Lieutenant George Brooke
16	4 January 1918 @ 1200	Bristol F.2b (B7255)	Albatros D.V	Driven down 'out of control'	Menen	Observer: Captain John H. Hedley
17	28 January 1918 @ 1715	Bristol F.2b	DFW C	Driven down 'out of control'	North of Bourlon Wood	Pilot: Second Lieutenant John S. Chick

== Bibliography ==
- Guttman, Jon & Dempsey, Harry (2009). Pusher Aces of World War I. Osprey Publishing. ISBN 978-1-84603-417-6.
