= Hawker Cygnet =

1920s British ultralight aircraft

Cygnet
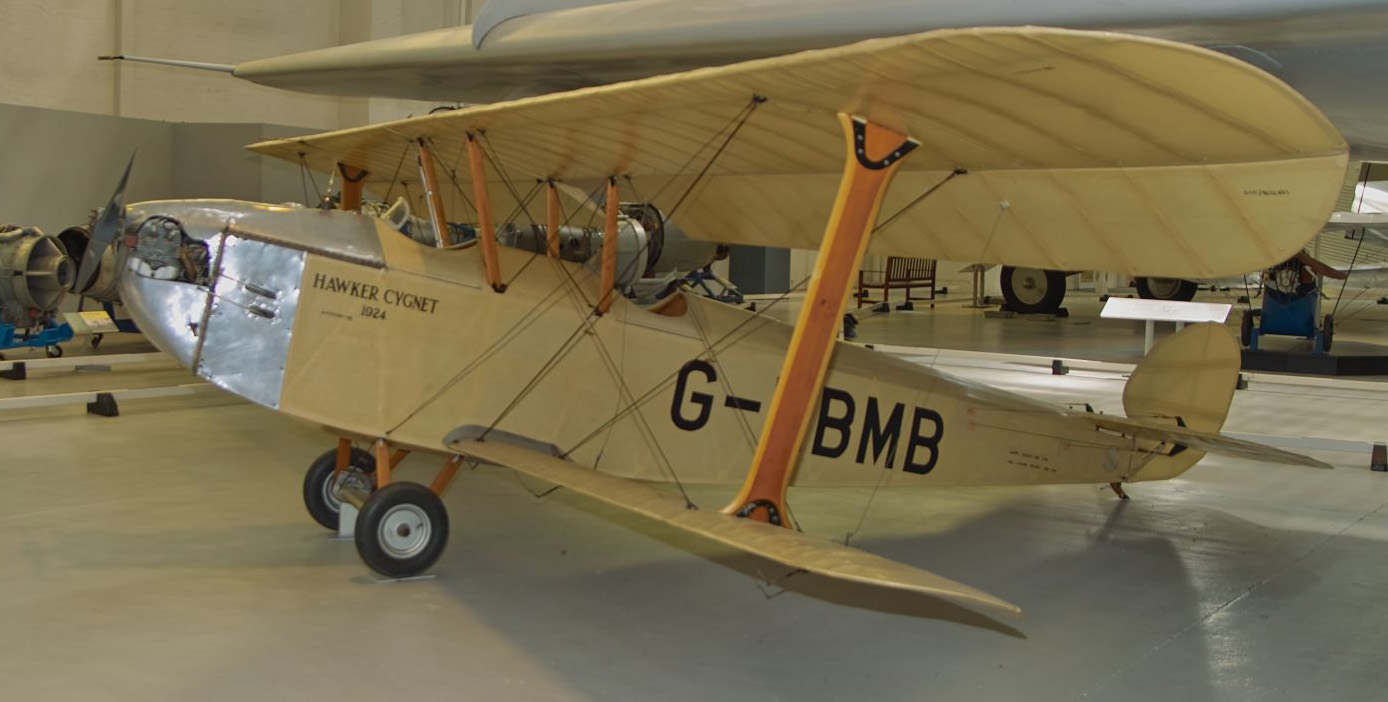
- Hawker Cygnet G-EBMB at RAF Museum, Cosford

General information
- Type: light competition aircraft
- Manufacturer: Hawker Engineering Co.
- Designer: Sydney Camm
- Number built: 2 (+ 1 replica)

History
- First flight: 1924

The Hawker Cygnet is a British ultralight sesquiplane aircraft of the 1920s.

== Background ==
In 1924, the Royal Aero Club organized a Light Aircraft Competition. £3000 was offered in prizes. An entry was made by Hawker Aircraft, which was a design by Sydney Camm, the Cygnet. Camm had joined Hawker the previous year. Two aircraft were built (G-EBMB and G-EBJH) and were entered in the competition, held in 1924 at Lympne Aerodrome, by Thomas Sopwith and Fred Sigrist. The aircraft were flown by Longton (No. 14) and Raynham (No. 15) and came in 4th and 3rd places respectively. In 1925, G-EBMB was entered again in the 100 mi (161 km) International Handicap Race, this time flown by George Bulman, who won at a speed of 75.6 mph (121.7 km/h). At the same meeting, the Cygnet came in 2nd in the 50 mi (80 km) Light Aeroplane Race. In 1926, both aircraft were again entered in the Daily Mail competition for £5,000 prize money over six days' flying around South-East England, piloted by Bulman (No. 6) and Flight Lieutenant JS Chick and Flying Officer RL Ragg (No. 4), taking first and second place respectively.

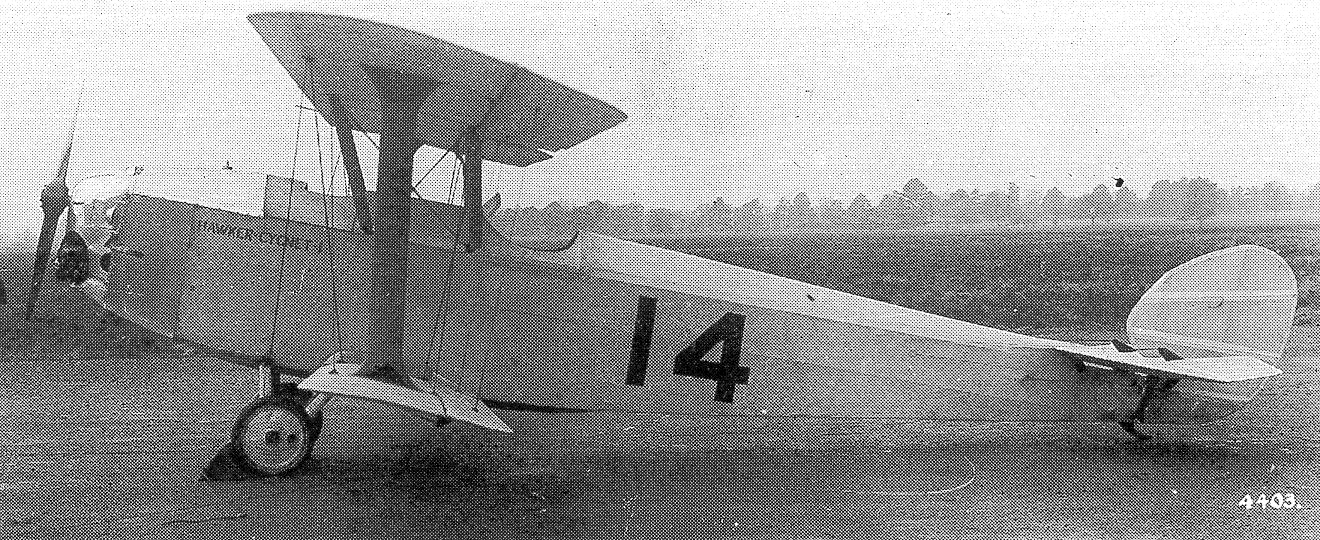

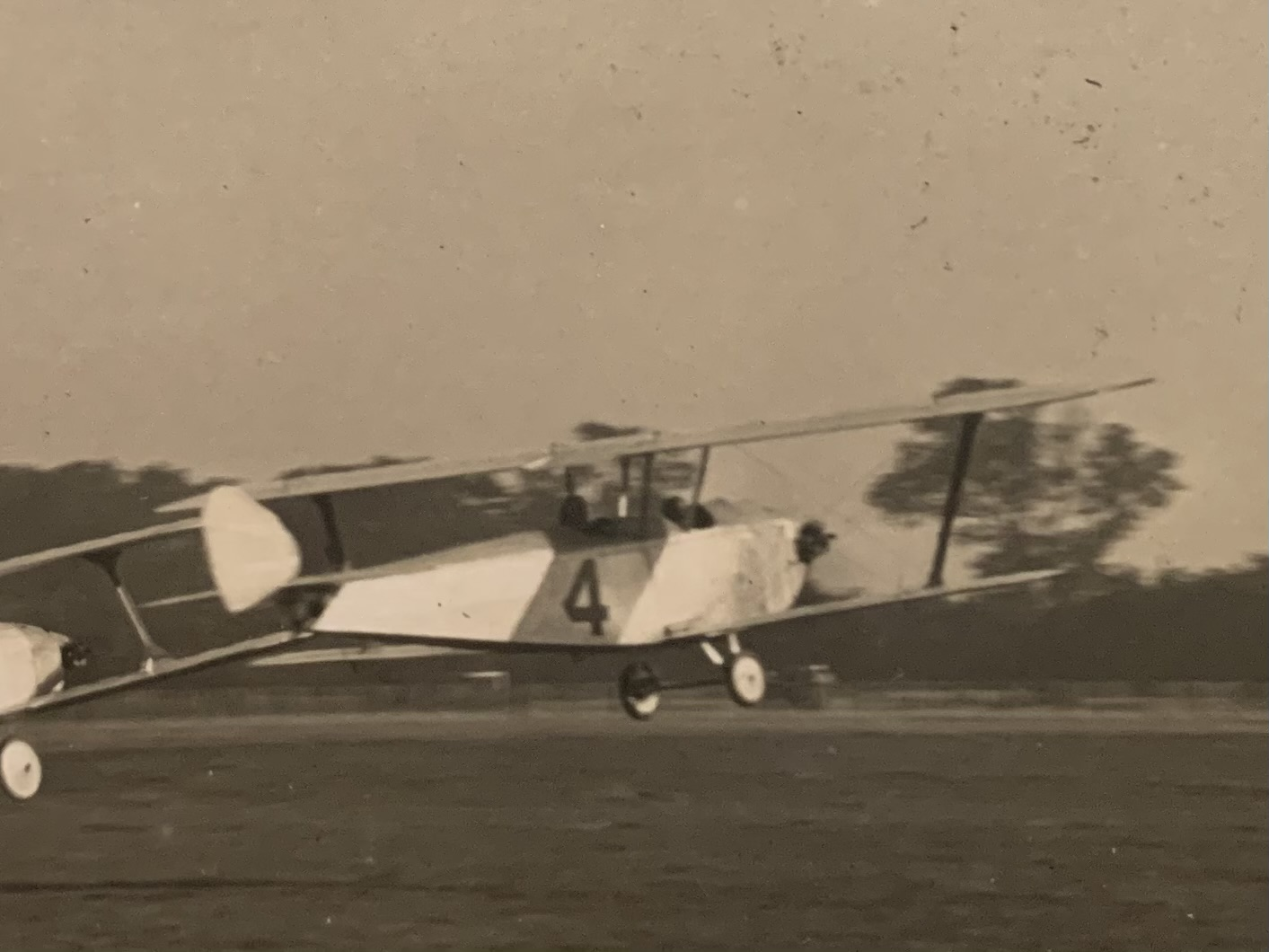

== Design ==
The aircraft were of wood-and-fabric construction, the fuselage being four longerons-strutted in the fashion of a Warren girder. The wing had two box spars with Warren truss ribs. Initially the two aircraft were powered, one by an Anzani, and the other by an ABC Scorpion (both opposed twin-cylinder engines). In 1926 the engines in both Cygnets were changed to the Bristol Cherub III, another twin-cylinder engine. The airframe weighed a remarkably low 270 lb, and its weight when empty was only 373 lb.

== Postwar history ==
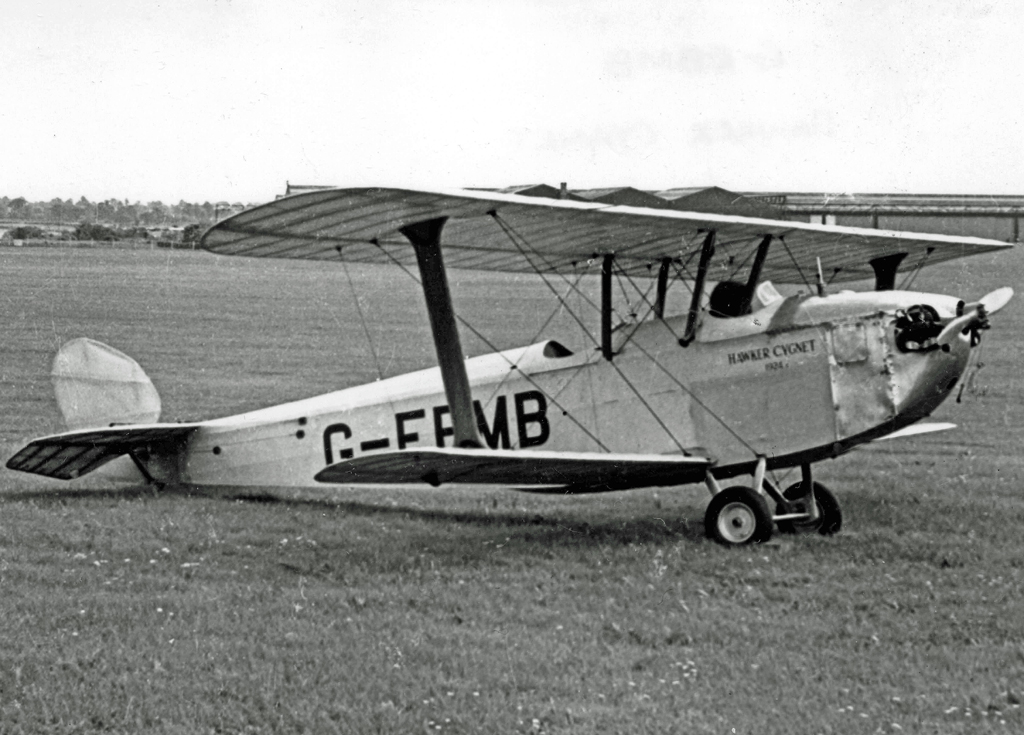
The surviving Cygnet on display in airworthy condition at Coventry Airport in 1954

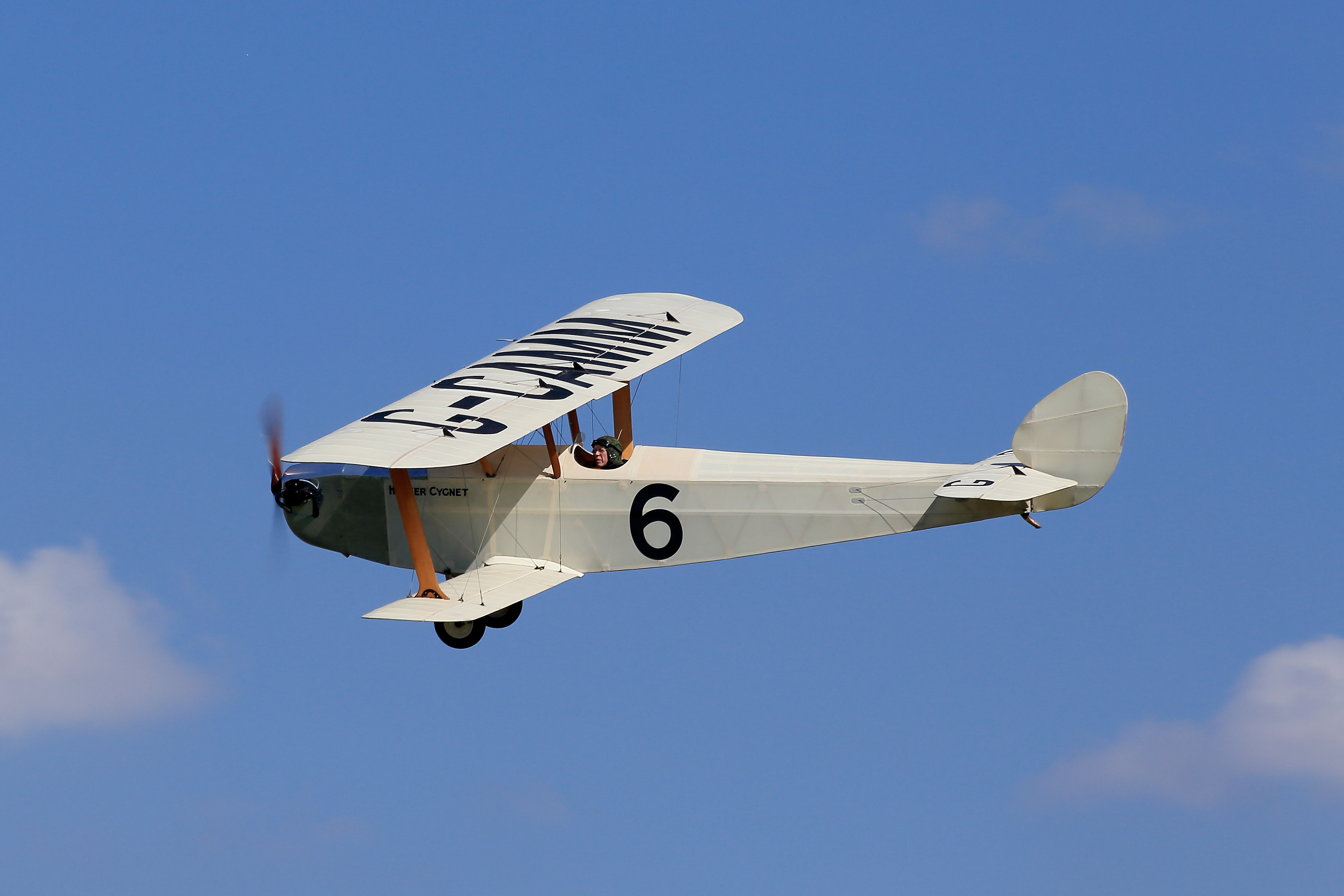
Hawker Cygnet (Shuttleworth Collection, replica 1993)

G-EBMB was kept by Hawker in storage until 1946, when it was refurbished and reassembled at Hawker's Langley Aerodrome. It was later transferred to their new facility at Dunsfold, where it stayed, being flown to various displays and airshows, until 1972, when it was transferred for exhibition at the Royal Air Force Museum at Hendon. More recently it has been transferred to its site at RAF Cosford in Shropshire, where it can now be seen. G-EBJH crashed in 1927 and was destroyed. An airworthy replica (G-CAMM) is on display at the Shuttleworth Collection, Old Warden, Bedfordshire.

== Specifications ==
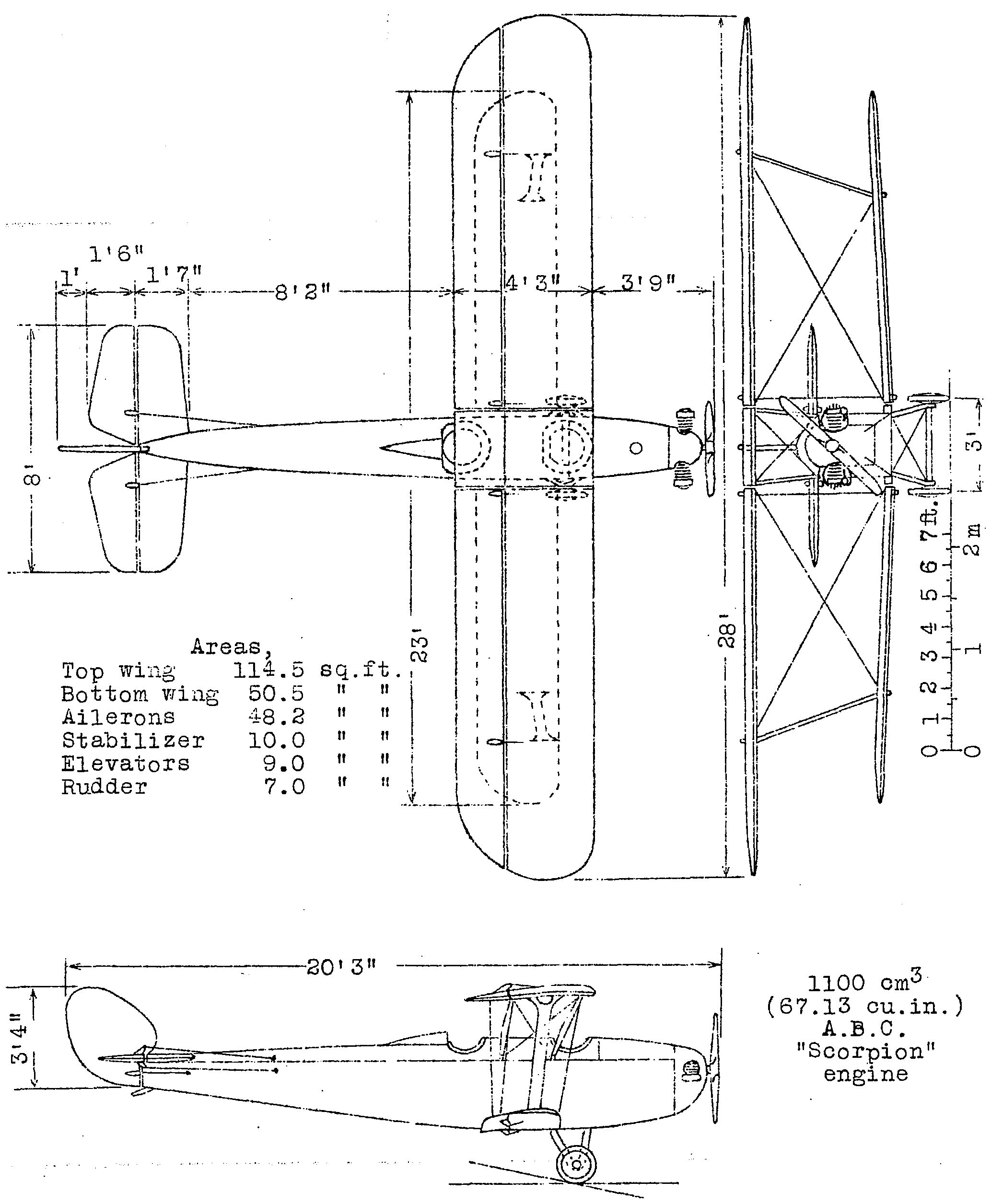
Hawker Cygnet 3-view drawing from NACA-TM-289

Data from Hawker Aircraft since 1920

General characteristics

- Crew: 2
- Length: 20 ft 5 in (6.22 m)
- Wingspan: 28 ft 0 in (8.53 m)
- Width: 8 ft 0 in (2.44 m) (folded)
- Height: 5 ft 10 in (1.78 m)
- Wing area: 165 sq ft (15.3 m^{2})
- Empty weight: 373 lb (169 kg)
- Gross weight: 950 lb (431 kg)
- Powerplant: 1 × Bristol Cherub III 2-cylinder piston engine, 34 hp (25 kW)

Performance

- Maximum speed: 82 mph (132 km/h, 71 kn) at sea level
- Service ceiling: 8,900 ft (2,700 m) (absolute ceiling)
- Time to altitude: 11 min 20 s to 5,000 ft (1,500 m)

== See also ==
Aircraft of comparable role, configuration, and era

- De Havilland Humming Bird

Related lists

- List of civil aircraft
