= Thomas Harries =

Thomas Harries may refer to:

- Sir Thomas Harries, 1st Baronet (1550–1628), English lawyer and politician
- Thomas M. Harries (born 1888), Scottish World War I flying ace
- Tom Rhys Harries (born 1990), Welsh actor
