= John Herbert Hedley =

British flying ace (1887–1977)

- Born: 19 July 1887; North Shields, Northumberland, England
- Died: 1 April 1977 (aged 89); Los Angeles, California, United States
- Military career
- Allegiance: United Kingdom
- Branch: British Army; Royal Air Force
- Service years: 1914–1918
- Rank: Captain
- Nicknames: The Luckiest Man Alive, Mr 4 Leaf Clover
- Units: Northumberland Fusiliers; 26th Battalion (3rd Tyneside Irish); Army Cyclist Corps; Lincolnshire Regiment (17th Labour Company); Labour Corps; No. 62 Squadron Royal Flying Corps; No. 20 Squadron Royal Flying Corps; No. 20 Squadron RAF
- Awards: French Croix de Guerre
- Other work: Accountant, speaker, lawyer, writer

Captain John Herbert Hedley (19 July 1887 – 1 April 1977) was a World War I British flying ace credited with eleven aerial victories. The observer ace claimed to have survived a bizarre flying mishap which earned him the moniker "The Luckiest Man Alive." Hedley also survived uninjured after his plane was shot down in 1918, and he became a prisoner of war. After his immigration to the United States in 1920, he became a regular on the lecture circuit, enthralling American audiences with the stories of his military service.

== Family background ==
John Herbert Hedley, son of Ralph Hedley and his wife Ann Dunn Hair Hedley, was born on 19 July 1887 in North Shields, Northumberland, England. He was the oldest of three surviving sons. In 1891 and 1901, John, his parents, and two brothers continued to live in North Shields. His father was employed as a shipyard timekeeper, and his mother worked as a general shopkeeper. However, Ralph Hedley (1863–1901) died at age 38, shortly after the 1901 census, his death registered at Tynemouth, Northumberland in the second quarter of the year. At the time of the 1911 census, John Hedley was employed as an accountant's clerk and resided with his widowed mother and two younger brothers in North Shields. His mother, Ann Dunn Hair Hedley (1859–1912), died the following year at age 52. In the last quarter of 1912, John's marriage to Isabella C Sands was registered in Tynemouth, Northumberland. His son John Herbert Hedley, Jr. was born in 1914 in North Shields, the birth also registered in Tynemouth.

== Military career ==
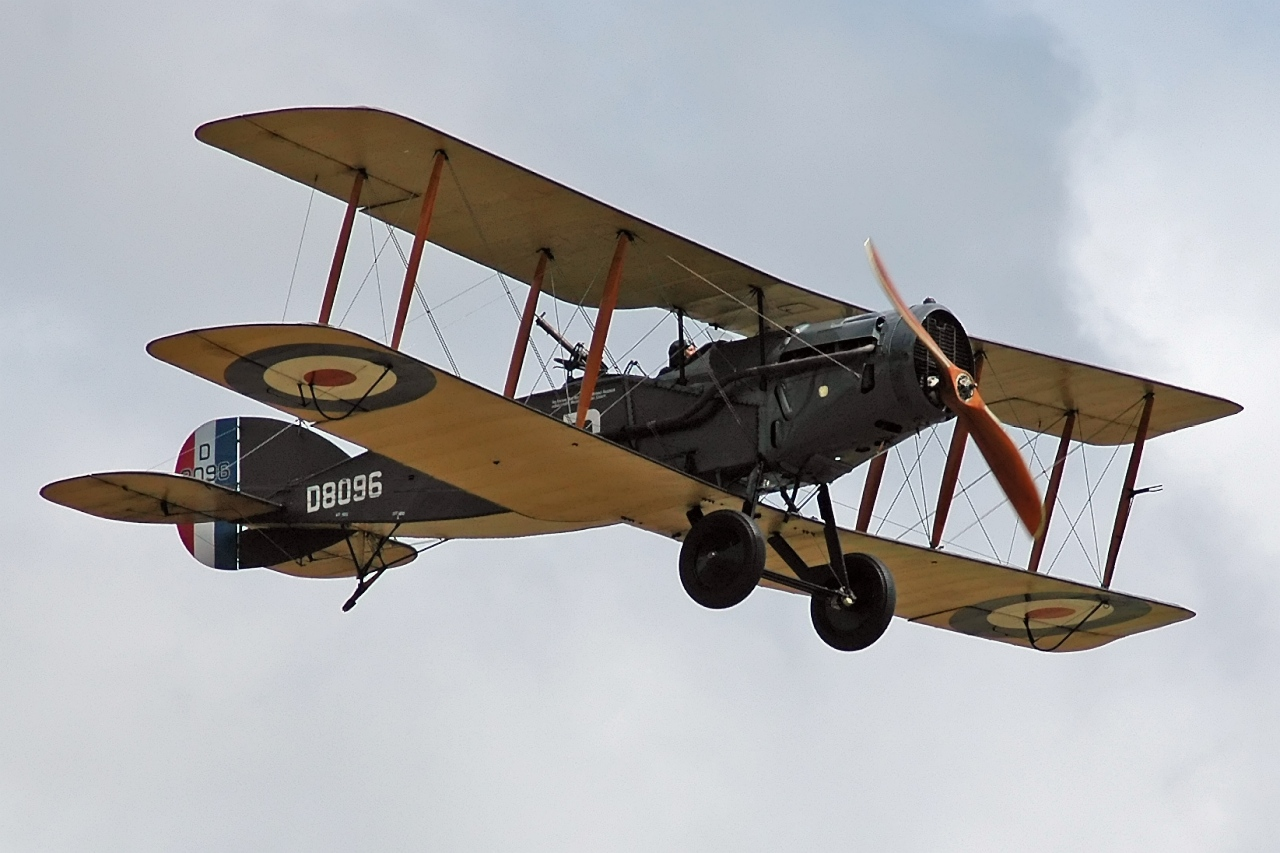
Hedley scored his victories from the Bristol F.2b.

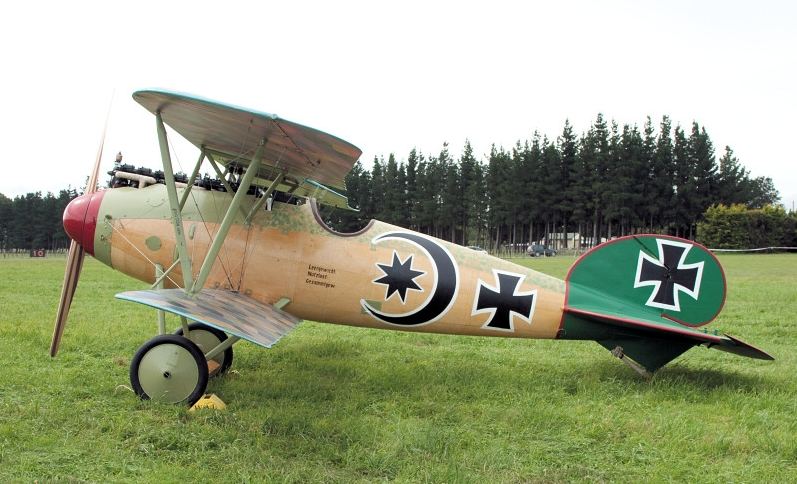
Hedley scored most of his victories against the Albatros D.V.

There is some disagreement among a variety of sources with regard to the details of John Hedley's military career. Hedley indicated that he joined the British Army on 4 August 1914. His medal index card indicates that he was with the Northumberland Fusiliers. This is supported by the London Gazette which reported that Hedley received a promotion from temporary Second Lieutenant to temporary Captain in the 26th Battalion (3rd Tyneside Irish) of the Northumberland Fusiliers on 1 May 1915. On 27 July 1915, he was appointed temporary Captain in the Army Cyclist Corps, from the 26th (Service) Battalion (3rd Tyneside Irish) of the Northumberland Fusiliers. The Gazette further indicated that he returned to the Northumberland Fusiliers as temporary Captain on 10 November 1915. According to author Norman Franks, John Herbert Hedley served with the Lincolnshire Regiment (17th Labour Company) before transfer to the Royal Flying Corps General List and was not promoted to temporary Captain until 13 April 1917. This is partially supported by the Gazette, which announced that temporary Captain J. H. Hedley of the Lincolnshire Regiment was appointed temporary captain in the Labour Corps, retaining present seniority, effective 13 April 1917. Further, Franks indicates that in October 1917, Hedley was with the No. 62 Squadron of the Royal Flying Corps in England and the following month, on 6 November 1917, he joined No. 20 Squadron of the Royal Flying Corps. However, the London Gazette indicates that temporary Captain J. H. Hedley, Labour Corps, transferred to the Royal Flying Corps General List on 22 December 1917, with seniority from 4 November 1917. Captain John Hedley is credited with eleven aerial victories, all while he was with No. 20 Squadron, and all from the Bristol F.2b.

The aviator was given the nickname "The Luckiest Man Alive" by Floyd Gibbons, Chicago Tribune war correspondent during World War I. John Hedley claimed that while in aerial combat with German fighters in early 1918, his pilot Reginald "Jimmy" Makepeace put their plane into an abrupt nosedive, and Hedley tumbled out of the aircraft. The pilot continued his rapid descent for several hundred feet. However, when the plane pulled up, the ejected observer Hedley purportedly grabbed the tail and climbed back into his seat. It was thought that Hedley had been caught in the slipstream of the plane and had been brought down at the same velocity as the aircraft. The shaken pilot and observer then returned safely to their base.

On 27 March 1918, Captains John Herbert Hedley and Robert Kirby Kirkman in Bristol F.2b (B1156) were shot down by Leutnant Karl Gallwitz of Jasta 2. Both survived the crash without injuries and were captured. For many years, it was mistakenly thought that Hedley and Kirkman had been taken down by none other than Manfred von Richthofen himself. On 12 March 1918, Hedley was recommended for four aircraft destroyed, four aircraft sent out of control, and one balloon deflated. He received the French Croix de Guerre, gazetted on 28 April 1918. Hedley indicated that he also received the Belgian Croix de Guerre. Captain Hedley spent most of the rest of the year in a German prisoner of war camp, and was repatriated from Germany on 13 December 1918.

== List of aerial victories ==
No.	Date/time	Aircraft	Foe	Result	Location	Pilot
1	5 December 1917 / 0925	Bristol F.2b (A7144)	Albatros C	Driven out of control	Dadizele	Frank Johnson
2	10 December 1917 / 0915	Bristol F.2b (A7144)	Albatros D.V	Driven out of control	East of Staden	Frank Johnson
3	22 December 1917 / 1400	Bristol F.2b (A7144)	Albatros D.V	Destroyed in flames	Roeselare	Frank Johnson
4	22 December 1917 / 1420	Bristol F.2b (A7144)	Albatros D.V	Driven out of control	Roeselare	Frank Johnson
5	4 January 1918 / 1200	Bristol F.2b (A7255)	Albatros D.V	Driven out of control	Menen	Reginald Makepeace
6	4 February 1918 / 1055	Bristol F.2b	Balloon	Destroyed	Map grid 28K 5C	Thomas Colvill-Jones
7	4 February 1918 / 1100	Bristol F.2b	Albatros D.V	Destroyed	Map grid 28K 5C	Thomas Colvill-Jones
8	17 February 1918 / 1120	Bristol F.2b (B1177)	Pfalz D.III	Driven out of control	Moorslede	Frank Johnson
9	17 February 1918 / 1130	Bristol F.2b (B1177)	Pfalz D.III	Destroyed	West of Moorslede	Frank Johnson
10	23 March 1918 / 1210	Bristol F.2b (B1156)	Albatros D.V	Destroyed in flames	East of Wervicq	Robert Kirkman
11	23 March 1918 / 1212	Bristol F.2b (B1156)	Albatros D.V	Driven out of control	East of Menen	Robert Kirkman

Note: The Aerodrome disagrees with Norman Franks with regard to the pilots involved in the above victories. Instead, Makepeace is listed for victories 3 and 4, and Kirkman for Victories 7, 8, and 9. In addition, after the war, John Hedley indicated that he had scored thirteen aerial victories, twelve planes and one balloon.

== After the war ==
Promotional material for John Herbert Hedley's lecture "Rambling Through the Air."

After Captain Hedley's return to England, his second son, Sidney Roland Hedley, was born in 1920. The former prisoner of war immigrated to the United States, arriving in New York City on 31 October 1920. His wife and children immigrated the following year, arriving in New York on 22 August 1921. They resided on Michigan Avenue in Chicago, Cook, Illinois, where John Herbert Hedley, Sr. was naturalised on 3 May 1926.

John Hedley apparently was very successful on the lecture circuit in 1920s and early 1930s, regaling American crowds with the story of his near-death experiences in (and out) of the cockpit that had earned him his nickname, "The Luckiest Man Alive." The lecture that the former observer ace gave on a number of occasions was entitled Rambling Through the Air. It appears that the talks took place most frequently between 1928 and 1930, often in Illinois, but also in other states such as Indiana and Wisconsin. Hedley thrilled a variety of audiences as he recounted his military experiences, from his initial service with the British Army in 1914 to his time as a prisoner of war until late 1918. The highlight of his lecture was almost always his account of being thrown out of the plane three miles above the earth, falling two or three hundred feet, and landing back on the tail of his aircraft. However, in one newspaper account, there is the suggestion that his version of the account differed. The journalist indicated that Hedley had "retained his grasp on the macine (sic) gun." The aviator claimed to have fought Richthofen's Circus three times, as a member of the 20th Squadron of the Royal Flying Corps, with the final encounter resulting in his aircraft being shot down in flames by Manfred von Richthofen. Press reviews of his lectures were rather complimentary. It was not until many years later that the assertion regarding the Red Baron was disproved.

John Hedley's incredible tale was included among the anecdotes in the 1929 book Luck: Your Silent Partner by Lothrop Stoddard. In 1930, John Hedley was still living in Chicago, with his wife and two sons. His occupation at that time was reported to be a lawyer. By 1942, the year of the United States World War II draft registration, Hedley resided in Dayton, Ohio. At the time of an interview conducted in 1960, Hedley was living in Hollywood as a retired accountant. John Herbert Hedley died in Los Angeles on 1 April 1977.

Despite his death, the former aviator still appears to have an audience. In 2009, the story of Hedley's bizarre mishap in 1918 was included in the book Strange But True, America: Weird Tales from All 50 States. In addition, John Herbert Hedley and his incredible tale were the subject of the 2011 YouTube video The Luckiest Man Alive! – Strange as it Seems (2011).
