= Grosvenor Cup =

Light aircraft time trial competition

The Grosvenor Challenge Cup
- Awarded for: Fastest time over a measured distance (time trial)
- Country: England
- Presented by: Edward Grosvenor
- First award: 1923
- Final award: 1955

The Grosvenor Challenge Cup, commonly known as the Grosvenor Cup, was a trophy presented by Lord Edward Grosvenor in 1923 to the winner of a light aircraft time trial competition. Entries were initially restricted to British designs using aero engines of less than 150 horsepower. The first competitions were held at Lympne Aerodrome in Kent. The contest continued until 1935 with a break to 1949 when the Royal Aero Club resumed the races at Elmdon where the entry was opened to British and international designs with a weight less than 1,000 kilograms.

For the 1949 event the contest had been briefly renamed to The Grosvenor Challenge Trophy Race, the 1950 event reverted to the former title.

== Grosvenor ==
Lord Edward Grosvenor the former Royal Naval Air Service (RNAS) aviator and the youngest son of the Duke of Westminster presented the cup, his objective in offering the cup "is to give a chance to the low-power machine, one comparable to the average motor car, with a horse-power of say thirty or forty. I think this will prove the most suitable type for general use, as the really low-powered light aeroplane will not be large enough for general touring about the country."

== 1923 ==
For the first handicap race in 1923 they were ten entrants for the first prize of a £100 and a second prize of £50, the winner was also allowed to keep the cup for a year. Only nine aircraft started the race and only five made it to the finishing line, the first to land was Walter Longton in the Sopwith Gnu. Lord Edward Grosvenor witnessed the start and the end of the race at Lympne and the cup was presented to the winner by Beatrice Grosvenor. During the race Major Ernest Leslie Foot died when his Bristol M.1 G-EAVP aircraft crashed at Chertsey.

The only female entrant was Mrs Oliver Atkey (nee Dulcibella Evangeline Clifford (1894-1960)), in "a machine of D.H. type". The year before, her flight from Leeds to Edgeware was widely reported as the longest flight by a woman pilot in Britain.

== 1924 ==
In 1924 the entry requirement was changed from an engine with no more than 150hp power to those a displacement no more than 1,100cc. Originally planned to be flown from Lympne to Manston twice, this was later changed to a course closer to the airfield. The aircraft did eight circuits of the course to complete 100 miles. The race had eighteen entries.

== 1925 ==
In 1925 the handicap race used the same eight circuit course around Lympne as in 1924 but the entry requirement was changed to aircraft with engines that weighed no more than 275lb. The race had twelve entries and was won by Flight Lieutenant J.S. Chick flying the RAE Hurricane.

== Summary table ==
Sources: Flightglobal Archive and Dorman 1951.

Date	Location	Course length miles	Course	Winner	Winning pilot	Aircraft type	Engine type	Registration	Average speed mph
23 June 1923	Lympne	404	Lympne, Croydon, Birmingham (Castle Bromwich), Bristol (Filton), Croydon, Lympne	Frank McClean	Walter Longton	Sopwith Gnu	Le Rhône 9J	G-EAGP	87.6
4 October 1924	Lympne	100	Lympne, Postling, Hastingleigh, Lympne (eight laps)	Alliott Verdon Roe	Bert Hinkler	Avro Avis	Bristol Cherub	G-EBKP	65.87
3 August 1925	Lympne	100	Lympne, Postling, Hastingleigh, Lympne	P.G.N.Peters	Flt Lt J.S.Chick	RAE Hurricane	Bristol Cherub	G-EBHS	81.19
18 September 1926	Lympne	75	Lympne, Postling, Hastingleigh, Lympne (six laps)	Robert Blackburn	Sqn Ldr W.H.Longton	Blackburn Bluebird	Armstrong Siddeley Genet		84.95
30 July 1927	Hucknall	15		Mrs S.C.Elliott-Lynn	Mrs S.C.Elliott-Lynn	de Havilland DH.60 Moth	ADC Cirrus II		88.5
1928	No contest								
5 October 1929	Cramlington	31.7		Newcastle-upon-Tyne Aero Club	G.S.Kemp	de Havilland DH.60 Moth	ADC Cirrus II	G-EBPT	98
7 September 1930	Desford	33		Newcastle-upon-Tyne Aero Club	L.Turnbull	de Havilland DH.60 Moth	ADC Cirrus II	G-EBQV	95
22 August 1931	Cramlington	53.5		H.Peake	Sqn Ldr J.W.Woodehouse	Blackburn Bluebird	de Havilland Gipsy I		95
2 July 1932	Portsmouth	50	Three laps	Carol S. Napier	Carol S. Napier	Westland Widgeon	de Havilland Gipsy I	G-AADE	98
1933-34	No contests								
13 July 1935	Desford	84		W.Lindsay-Everard	Lt Cmdr C.W.Phillips	de Havilland DH.60 Moth	de Havilland Gipsy III		109.25
1936-48	No contests								
1 August 1949	Elmdon	40	Two laps of a 20 mile course	Midland Aero Club	D.A.Arch	Auster Autocrat	Blackburn Cirrus Minor II		112.5
29 July 1950	Woolsington	80	Four laps of a 20 mile course	K.C.Millican	K.C.Millican	Tipsy Trainer I	Walter Mikron II		97.5
23 June 1951	Hatfield	105	Three laps of a 35 mile course	Cancelled due to bad weather					
11 July 1952	Woolsington	65.6	Two laps of a 33 mile course	D.F. Ogilvy	D.F. Ogilvy	Avro Club Cadet	de Havilland Gipsy Major	G-ACHP	106.5
20 June 1953	Southend-on-Sea	29.67	Three laps of a 9.89 mile course	D.R. Robertson	D.R. Robertson	de Havilland Moth Minor	de Havilland Gipsy Minor	G-AFPN	111
17 June 1955	Whitchurch	18	Three laps of a six mile course		Miss Freydis M. Leaf	Tipsy Trainer I			92

== See also ==
- Gordon Bennett Trophy
- King's Cup Race
- Lympne light aircraft trials
- Schneider Trophy
