= Robert Kirby Kirkman =

English flying ace

- Born: 25 June 1891; Cosby, Leicestershire, England
- Died: 9 May 1938 (aged 46); Finchley, London, England
- Military career
- Allegiance: United Kingdom
- Branch: British Army; Royal Air Force
- Rank: Captain
- Units: Honourable Artillery Company; Leicestershire Regiment; No. 20 Squadron RFC
- Conflicts: World War I; Western Front
- Awards: Military Cross
- Other work: Chartered Accountant

Captain Robert Kirby Kirkman MC (25 June 1891 – 9 May 1938) was an English World War I flying ace credited with eight aerial victories.

== Family background ==
Robert Kirkman was born in Cosby, Leicestershire, the youngest of eight children of farmer John William Kirkman and his wife Annie Elizabeth (née Parry).

== Military service ==
Kirkman served in the Honourable Artillery Company, Territorial Force, as a private before being commissioned as a temporary second lieutenant in the Leicestershire Regiment on 12 December 1915. He was seconded to the Royal Flying Corps, and appointed a flying officer, transferred to the General List, on 14 February 1917, and promoted to lieutenant on 1 June. Posted to No. 20 Squadron, flying the Bristol F.2b fighter, between 11 September 1917 and 23 March 1918 Kirkman was credited with eight aerial victories, all against Albatros D.Vs, with five driven down out of control, and three set on fire and destroyed. On 18 December 1917 he was appointed a flight commander with the temporary rank of captain.

Kirkman was awarded the Military Cross on 26 March 1918, which was gazetted on 23 August. His citation read:

Military Cross
Temporary Captain Robert Kirby Kirkman, General List and RFC.

"For conspicuous gallantry and devotion to duty. He led a patrol of eleven aeroplanes, and through his skilful manoeuvring and leadership the patrol destroyed four enemy scouts and drove down three more out of control. On several other occasions he has driven down and destroyed hostile machines, and has always set a fine example of courage and determination."

However, on 27 March he and his observer, Captain John Herbert Hedley, were shot down by Karl Gallwitz of Jasta Boelcke near Foucaucourt and captured. He remained a prisoner of war until after the armistice of 11 November 1918, and was transferred to RAF's unemployed list on 28 February 1919.

== Post-war career ==
Kirkman became a Chartered Accountant, and worked for Burmah Oil for 20 years. He died in Finchley, London, on 9 May 1938.
