= Dulcibella Clifford =

British pilot

- Born: December 31, 1894; Richmond, Surrey
- Died: 1960 (aged 65–66)
- Other names: Ms. Oliver Atkey: Dulcibella Atkey
- Citizenship: British
- Known for: Aviation
- Spouse: Oliver Atkey (m. 1915)

Dulcibella Evangeline Clifford (1894-1960) also known as Mrs. Oliver Atkey was a famous British female pilot and the first woman to receive a British pilot's license after WWI. She one of the earliest female aviators, and was thought to be one of only 56 female pilots in the world in 1927.

She held the record for longest flight by a female pilot with a passenger for a flight in 1922. She was also the first woman to fly across the English Channel with a passenger. She was also the only female entrant into the 1923 Grosvenor Cup and possible the first British female pilot to enter an air race.

== Personal life ==
Clifford was born either in the late 1880s or 1890s, according to her pilots certificate 1894. She worked as a nurse in Belgian in 1915 and while working met and married surgeon Oliver Francis Henry Atkey. They were married until their deaths in 1960.

== Flying career ==
Clifford learned to fly in Hounslow and passed the test to obtain her pilot's license in 1919. Her record setting passenger flight was in a de Havilland airplane from Leeds to Edgewire. She held the record for longest flight with a passenger made by a female pilot in the world for a flight in 1922.
