= Hawker Danecock =

Biplane for Danish air force and naval service

Danecock
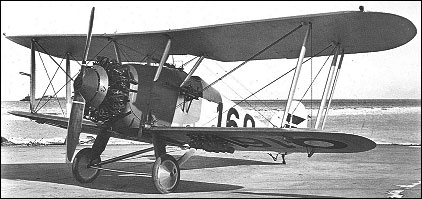
- One of the 12 Danish built Dankoks

General information
- Type: Fighter
- Manufacturer: Hawker Engineering Co.
- Designer: Sydney Camm
- Primary user: Denmark
- Number built: 15

History
- Manufactured: 1925-1926
- Introduction date: 1925
- First flight: 18 December 1925
- Developed from: Hawker Woodcock

The Hawker Danecock biplane was developed from the Hawker Woodcock for the Danish air force and naval service.

== Design and development ==
In 1925 the Danish Government notified Hawker that they would order three aircraft similar to the Woodcock, but with certain improvements. This resulted in Sydney Camm making minor changes to the wings and cockpit area. Compared to the Woodcock II, the Danecock had unequal span wings, a slightly lengthened fuselage, a 385 hp (287 kW) Armstrong Siddeley Jaguar IV engine and an armament of two 8 mm (0.315 in) Madsen machine guns. The first aircraft was flown on 18 December 1925 by George Bulman with all three aircraft delivered in February 1926.

== Operational history ==
After receiving the Hawker-built aircraft, Denmark obtained a licence to produce more Danecocks. This version, named the Dankok, was built in 1927 at the Danish Royal Naval Dockyard (Orlogsvaerftet) as the Orlogsvaerftet L.B.II. A total of 12 more were manufactured. One aircraft (a Hawker-build) broke the Scandinavian altitude record, reaching 28,208 ft (8,598 m). The Danecock/Dankok served until the mid-1930s when they were replaced by Hawker Nimrods. An example of the Dankok still exists in the Danish Aircraft Museum.

== Operators ==
Denmark

- Danish Army Air Service (Hærens Flyvertropper)
- Danish Naval Air Service (Marinens Flyvevæsen)

== Specifications ==
Data from Hawker Aircraft since 1920

General characteristics

- Crew: 1
- Length: 26 ft 1 1/4 in (7.96 m)
- Wingspan: 32 ft 7 in (9.93 m)
- Height: 10 ft 1 in (3.07 m)
- Wing area: 340 sq ft (32 m^{2})
- Empty weight: 2,128 lb (965 kg)
- Gross weight: 3,045 lb (1,381 kg)
- Fuel capacity: 52 imp gal (62 US gal; 240 L) Petrol/Benzol mix at 0.76 specific gravity
- Powerplant: 1 × Armstrong Siddeley Jaguar IV 14-cylinder two-row air-cooled radial piston engine, 385 hp (287 kW)
- Propellers: 2-bladed wooden fixed pitch propeller

Performance

- Maximum speed: 145 mph (233 km/h, 126 kn)
- Cruise speed: 105 mph (169 km/h, 91 kn)2.5 hours
- Service ceiling: 22,800 ft (6,900 m)
- Time to altitude: 10,000 ft (3,000 m) in 8 minutes 15 seconds

Armament

- Guns: 2 × synchronised 8 mm (0.315 in) Madsen machine guns with 720 rpg.

== See also ==
Related lists

- List of fighter aircraft
