= Melville Waddington =

Canadian World War I flying ace

Melville Wells Waddington
- Born: 21 December 1895; Toronto, York, Ontario, Canada
- Died: 14 August 1945 (aged 49); Ontario, Canada
- Military career
- Allegiance: United Kingdom
- Branch: Canadian Expeditionary Force; Royal Flying Corps
- Service years: 1916–1919
- Rank: Lieutenant
- Units: 12th Brigade Ammunition Column, Canadian Field Artillery; No. 20 Squadron RFC/RAF
- Conflicts: World War I • Western Front

Lieutenant Melville Wells Waddington (21 December 1895 – 14 August 1945) was a World War I Canadian flying ace credited with twelve aerial victories. He was the first observer ace in No. 20 Squadron of the Royal Flying Corps to score a victory in the Bristol Fighter.

== Background ==
Melville Wells Waddington, son of Herbert Waddington (5 Nov 1867 – 24 May 1919) and his wife Edna Judd Waddington, was born on 21 December 1895 in Toronto, Canada. At the time of the 1901 census, his family was living in Toronto, where they continued to reside in 1911. His father was an accountant and financier. Melville Waddington was reported to be a descendant of John Waddington of Hulme, Manchester.

== Military career ==
Melville Waddington served with the 12th Brigade Ammunition Column of the Canadian Field Artillery, receiving his commission in March 1916. He was found to be fit for the Canadian Overseas Expeditionary Force on 21 April 1916. He transferred to the Royal Flying Corps on 16 April 1917, and was posted to No. 20 Squadron on 18 June 1917. He is credited with twelve aerial victories as an observer with No. 20 Squadron. The first seven were with F.E.2d aircraft, the last five with Bristol F.2b planes. All of his victories were against Albatros aircraft.

On 29 June 1917, from F.E.2d (A6498), Lieutenant Waddington and his pilot Lieutenant Reginald Milburn Makepeace sent an Albatros D.V out of control over Houthem, Belgium. This was the observer's first aerial victory. He racked up his second on 6 July 1917, from F.E.2d (A6498) piloted by Second Lieutenant Malcolm McCall. They destroyed an Albatros D.V in flames over Comines. Lieutenant Waddington, as observer in F.E.2d (A6548), piloted by Harry George Ernest Luchford, sent two Albatros planes out of control on 17 and 21 July 1917, the first over Polygon Wood between Ypres and Zonnebeke, West Flanders, Belgium, and the second over Menen, West Flanders. There is some disagreement as to whether those last two victories were against D.III or D.V aircraft. Waddington scored a double victory on 27 July 1917 from F.E.2d (A1956), again with pilot Luchford. They took down two Albatros D.V planes north of Menen, destroying one in flames and sending the other out of control. His remaining victories were all with Lieutenant Makepeace as pilot. On 16 August 1917, with Makepeace piloting F.E.2d (A3), Waddington racked up his seventh win. They sent an Albatros D.V out of control over Zonnebeke.

By August 1917, No. 20 Squadron of the Royal Flying Corps was exchanging its F.E.2d aircraft for Bristol F.2b planes. On 3 September 1917, Lieutenant Waddington, with Lieutenant Makepeace as pilot, scored the first Bristol victory for No. 20 Squadron when, from A7214, they downed an Albatros D.V, which crashed between Menen and Werwicq. This was the eighth aerial victory for Waddington. Waddington and Makepeace scored four additional victories together, for a total of twelve for Waddington, five of those in Bristols. On 5 September 1917, from Bristol F.2b (A7203), they sent an Albatros D.V out of control west of Lille, France. This was the ninth victory for Waddington. His tenth was scored on 11 September 1917, from Bristol (A7214), when Waddington and Makepeace destroyed an Albatros D.V east of Menen. On 17 October 1917, they racked up a double victory (Waddington's eleventh and twelfth) when, from Bristol (A7255), they sent 2 Albatros D.Vs out of control, one over Zonnebeke and the other northeast of Zonnebeke.

Waddington returned to Canada in February 1918, arriving in Halifax, Nova Scotia, aboard the Saxonia. He served as an instructor, and on 14 August 1918 married Marjorie Jean Hill McLeod in Amherst, Nova Scotia. His occupation was listed as soldier. The London Gazette of 20 May 1919 announced that, on 31 March 1919, Lieutenant M. W. Waddington of the Royal Air Force, and Lieutenant of the Canadian Field Artillery, relinquished his commission on ceasing to be employed. This was also reported in the 29 May 1919 edition of Flight.

== After the war ==
According to aviation historian Norman Franks, Waddington was employed as a real estate and insurance salesman after the war. However, on four passenger lists from 1936, his occupation is recorded as accountant. On 14 August 1945, Waddington had a second heart attack and died.

== Gallery of aircraft ==
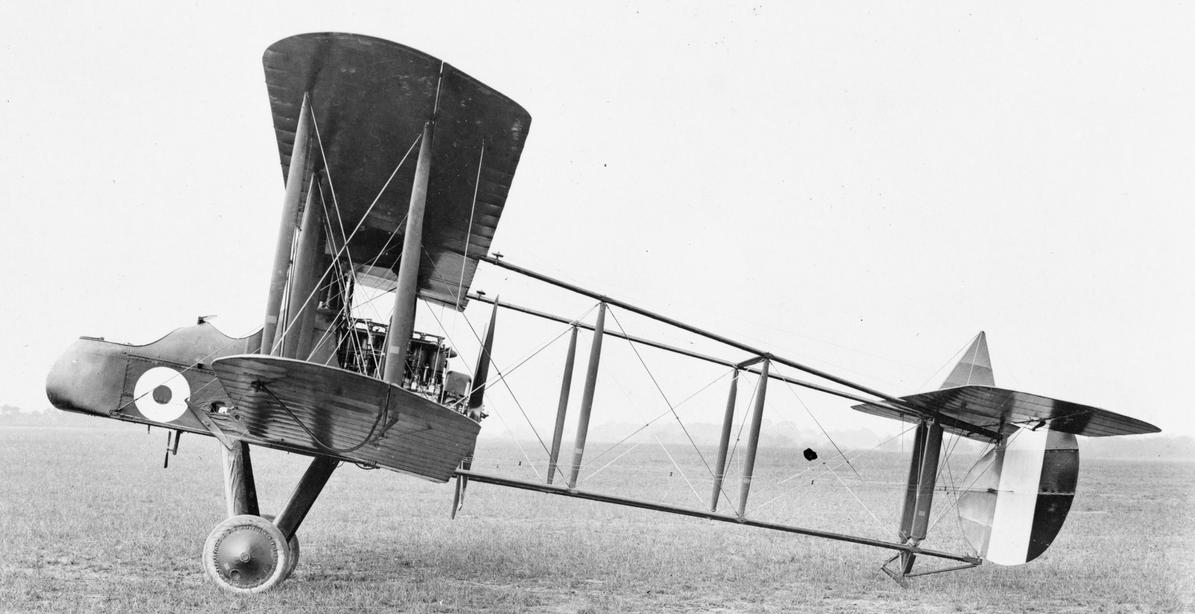
Royal Aircraft Factory F.E.2

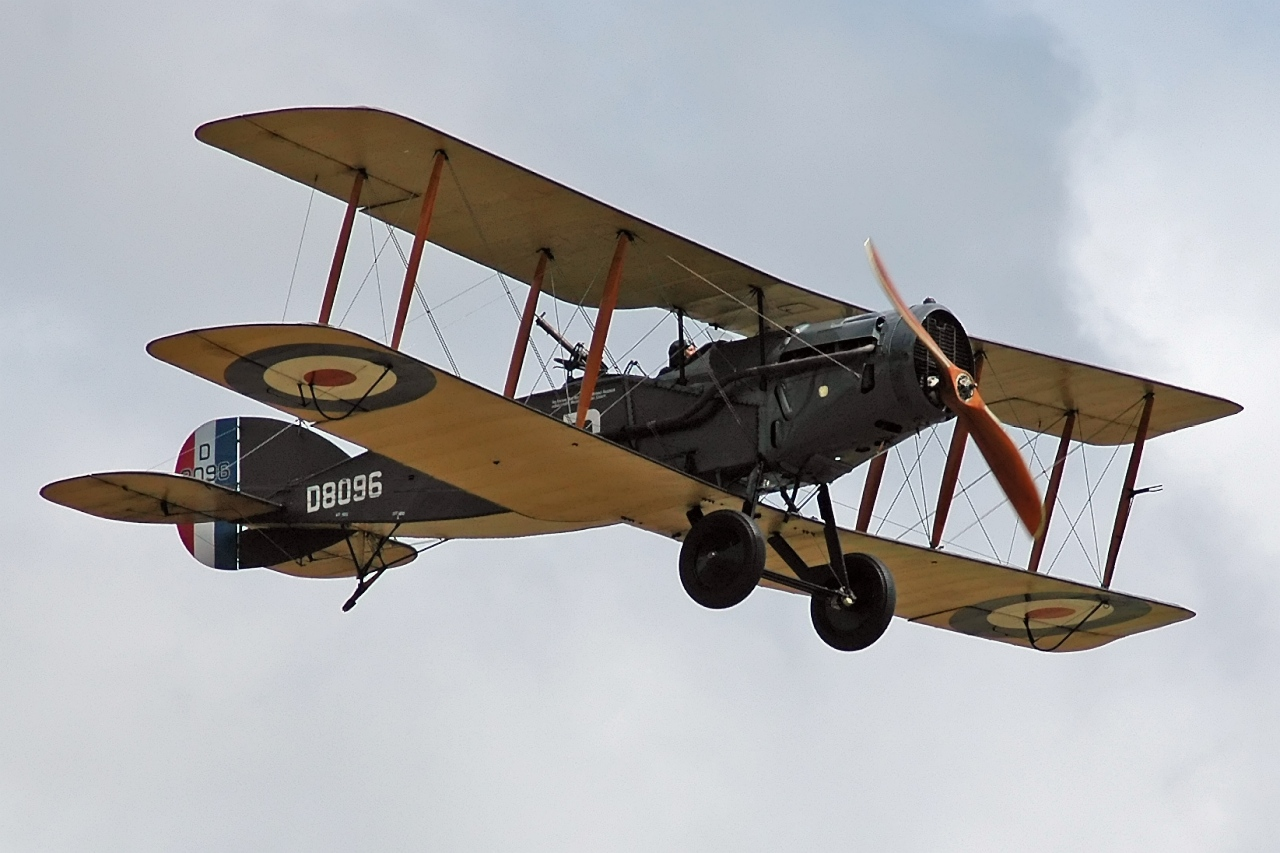
Bristol F.2 Fighter

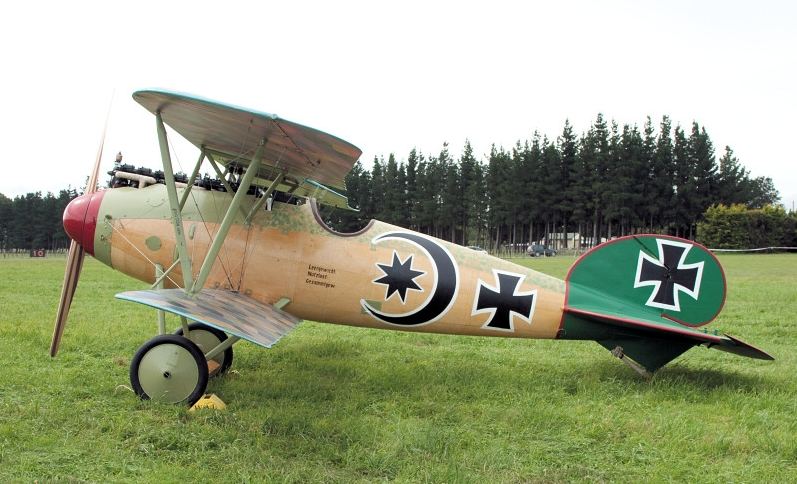
Albatros D.V
