= Karl Gallwitz =

World War I flying ace

- Born: 18 August 1895; Sigmaringen, German Empire
- Died: 17 May 1984 (aged 88); Göttingen, West Germany
- Military career
- Allegiance: German Empire
- Branch: Luftstreitkräfte
- Rank: Leutnant
- Units: Flieger-Abteilung (Artillerie) 231; Flieger-Abteilung 37; Jagdstaffel 29; Jagdstaffel 2
- Awards: Iron Cross First and Second Class

Leutnant Karl Gallwitz (18 August 1895 – 17 May 1984) was a World War I flying ace credited with ten aerial victories.

== Early life ==
Karl Gallwitz was born in Sigmaringen, the German Empire, in 1895. He visited the Gymnasium-school in Nordhausen.

== Aerial service ==
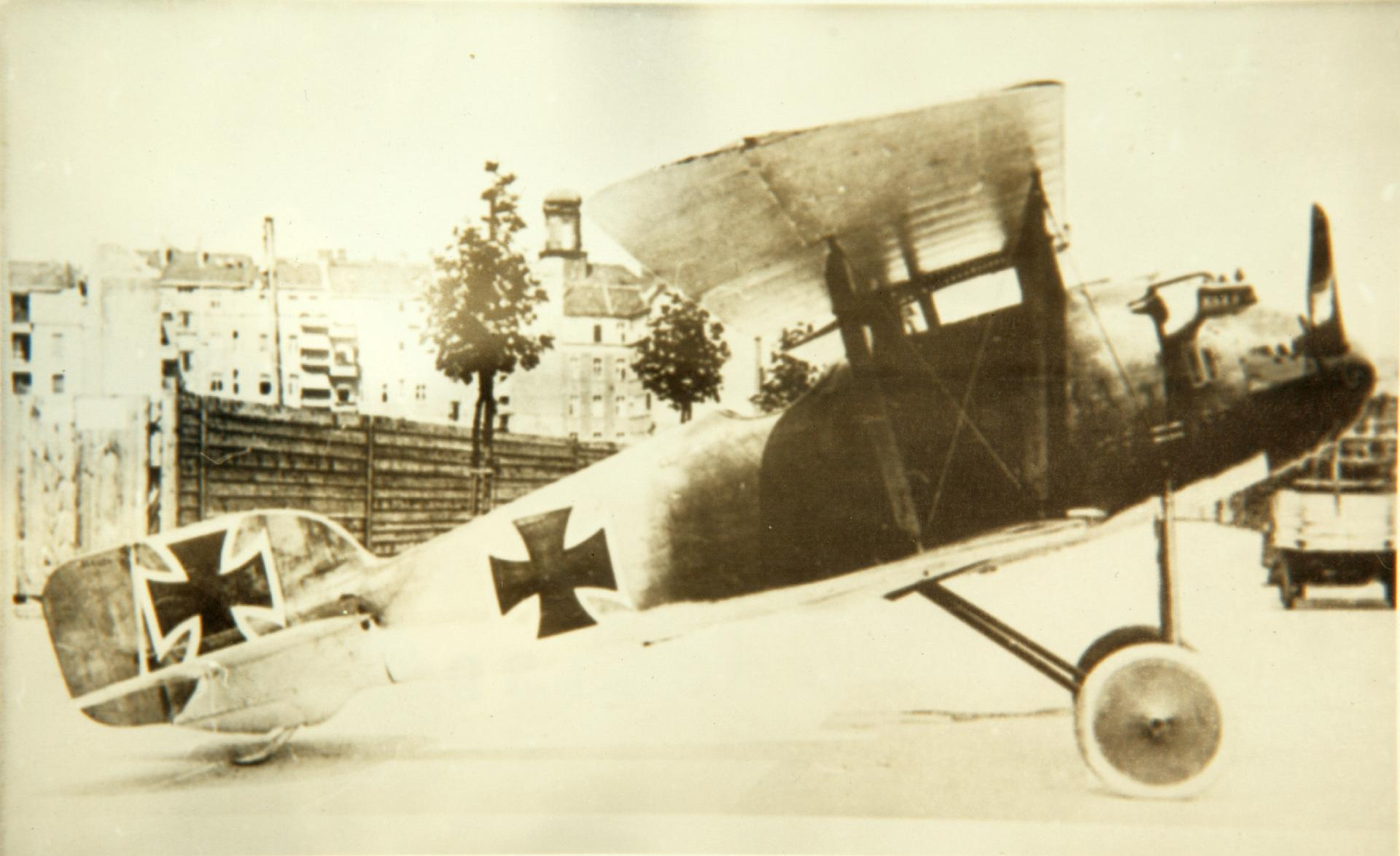
A Roland D.III, as flown by Karl Gallwitz.

Gallwitz originally flew a Roland D.III for artillery cooperation units on the Russian Front, shooting down two observation balloons with FA 37, before a brief assignment to Jasta 29. On 24 August 1917, he joined Jasta Boelcke in France. He scored three times in October; the last one, on the 27th, was over Arthur Rhys-Davids. He started over again in 1918, scoring five more times, including bringing down British aces Robert Kirby Kirkman and John Herbert Hedley. Gallwitz finished out his tally of ten on 21 April 1918, and crashed soon thereafter. Once he recuperated from his injuries, he was assigned to Inspekteur der Flieger.

== Postwar ==
From 1919 he studied Mechanical engineering in Braunschweig, Danzig and Stuttgart.

He later was a professor for agricultural machinery at the university of Göttingen, where he taught from 1936 to 1965.
