= Walter H. Longton =

Walter Hunt Longton
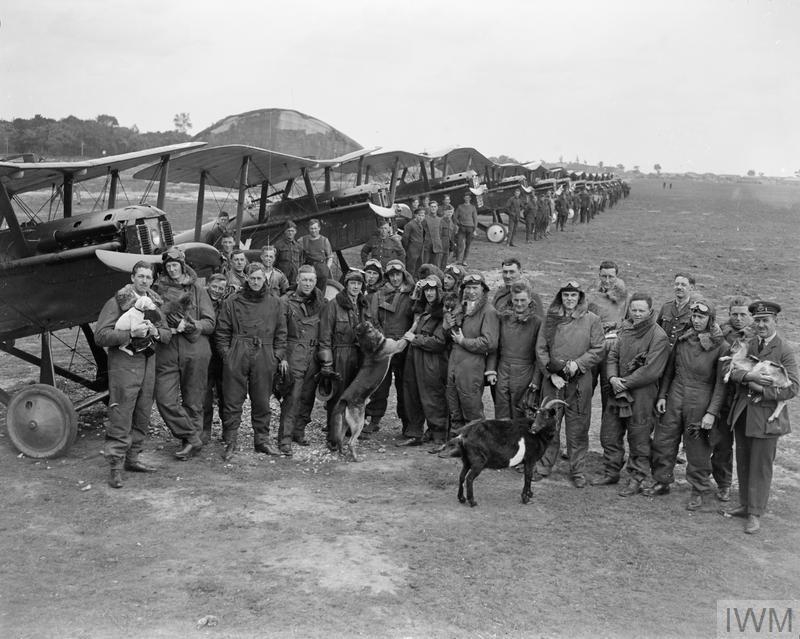
- Standing with, the officers of No. 85 Squadron, the Airman directly behind the black goat is Walter Hunt Longton on 21 June 1918
- Born: 10 September 1892; Whiston, Lancashire
- Died: 6 June 1927 (aged 34); Bournemouth, Dorset
- Burial place: Upavon Cemetery
- Military career
- Allegiance: United Kingdom
- Branch: Royal Flying Corps; Royal Air Force
- Rank: Squadron Leader
- Nickname: "Scruffy"
- Units: No. 24 Squadron RAF; No. 85 Squadron RAF; No. 58 Squadron RAF
- Conflicts: First World War
- Awards: Distinguished Flying Cross & Two Bars; Air Force Cross
- Other work: Air racing and trials during the 1920s

Walter Hunt Longton DFC** AFC (10 September 1892 – 6 June 1927) was an English flying ace of the First World War, credited with 11 confirmed aerial victories. Most unusually for a British or Commonwealth ace, all his victories resulted in the destruction of his foe.

Postwar, he became very involved in air racing, aviation exhibitions, and various competitive air events while continuing his military aviation career.

== First World War ==
On 29 April 1916, Private Longton was commissioned a temporary second lieutenant in the Royal Flying Corps (RFC). On 12 July 1916, he was appointed a flying officer in the RFC; such appointments customarily were made at the end of a pilot's training.

By mid-1918, he was posted to 85 Squadron as a Royal Aircraft Factory SE.5a pilot. On 3 June 1918, he was awarded the Air Force Cross by King George V. He would not score his first aerial victory until 7 July, when he destroyed a German Fokker D.VII fighter plane over Doulieu. He destroyed three more enemy planes in July: a Hannover two-seater reconnaissance craft on the 10th, an Albatros two-seater on 14 July, and a Pfalz D.III on 24 July.

On 5 August, he became an ace, shooting down an Albatros reconnaissance aircraft in flames. His next success, on 22 August, not only gained him another victory, but was cited as a major reason for his receiving the Distinguished Flying Cross:

On the 22nd August this officer led his formation of six machines to attack an equal number of enemy scouts. All the latter were accounted for, four being crashed and the remaining two driven down out of control. A brilliant performance, reflecting the greatest credit on this officer as leader, and all who took part in this engagement. During the last seven weeks Lieutenant Longton has destroyed seven enemy machines.

Longton would next score on 8 October, when he destroyed an observation balloon south of Busigny. His dearth of victories in September is at least partially explained by the citation for a bar to his D.F.C. :

Between 29th September and 9th October this officer carried out twelve tactical reconnaissances, bringing back most valuable information; he also displayed great gallantry in attacking enemy troops on the ground. On 9th October, when on a low patrol, he observed a machine-gun nest which appeared to be the sole obstacle to our cavalry advance. Having informed the cavalry and field artillery of the situation, he co-operated with the former in their attack, and, after the enemy had been driven out, pursued them with machine-gun fire as they retreated.

Longton would finish October with a rush of victories. On 14 October, he destroyed a Fokker D.VII over Wassigny. On 29 October, he destroyed another Fokker D.VII at 1430 hours; half an hour later, he teamed with Thomas M. Harries and H. V. Evans to destroy an enemy reconnaissance two-seater, scoring a win for each flier. The following day, Longton destroyed a Fokker D.VII over Marville.

== Post-war ==
On 16 April 1919, Longton gave up his commission in the Royal Air Force. On 3 June 1919, he was awarded a second bar to his Distinguished Flying Cross "for services rendered during the war." He then re-enlisted and was granted a permanent commission as a lieutenant on 1 August 1919. On 1 November 1919, he was promoted to flight lieutenant.

Longton stayed in the Royal Air Force, and was a participant in the RAF Pageant at Hendon on 3 July 1920. A photo in Flight Magazine shows him seated in a Fokker DVII adorned with Charlie Chaplin's Little Tramp on the side of its cockpit. At one point, Longton flew aerobatics to much acclaim.

Longton would participate in air exhibitions, races, and trials of various sorts through the 1920s right up until the year of his death. He competed in the 1920 Aerial Derby, but did not finish. Accounts of his feats are scattered throughout the aviation press. A few examples:

- Longton was a competitor in the Seventh Aerial Derby on 7 August 1922; however, the relay race in which he entered was cancelled due to a preliminary accident to one of the competitors.
- In mid-1923, he won the Grosvenor Challenge Cup air race in a Sopwith Gnu.
- On 8 October 1923, Longton flew in the Lympne light aircraft trials in an English Electric Wren, sharing first place and £1,500 in a competition to establish the most economical light, single-seat British aeroplane, flying 87.5 miles (140.8 km) on one gallon of fuel.
- On 3 July 1925, he flew a Martinsyde in the Fourth Annual King's Cup, but retired early on.

His racing and trials work seem not to have hurt his professional prospects. On 1 January 1924, he was promoted from flight lieutenant to squadron leader.

In early 1927, Longton's aircraft was peppered by shotgun fire from a farmer while Longton was racing at a low altitude.

On 6 June 1927, he was killed in a flying accident at Bournemouth, Dorset, England. He was buried under a headstone supplied by his wife, in Upavon cemetery, Wiltshire. He is also memorialized by a plaque erected by his old aviation comrades in 58 Squadron and Netheravon.
