= George Bulman (pilot) =

Group Captain George Bulman CBE MC AFC** FRAeS
- Born: Paul Ward Spencer Bulman; 8 April 1896; Luton, Bedfordshire, England
- Died: 6 May 1963 (aged 66); Surrey, England
- Military career
- Allegiance: United Kingdom
- Branch: British Army; Royal Air Force
- Service years: 1915–1925; 1941–1942
- Rank: Group Captain
- Units: Honourable Artillery Company; Royal Flying Corps; Royal Aircraft Establishment
- Conflicts: World War I World War II
- Awards: Commander of the Order of the British Empire; Military Cross; Air Force Cross & Two Bars
- Other work: Test pilot and company director

Group Captain Paul Ward Spencer Bulman, CBE, MC, AFC & Two Bars, FRAeS (8 April 1896 – 6 May 1963), universally known as George Bulman, (Note: This arose because Bulman had a poor memory for names, and so tended to call everybody George. When friends and colleagues called Bulman "George" in response, the nickname stuck.) was a pilot whose flying life spanned thirty years (1915–1945).

== Early years ==
Bulman was born in Luton in 1896, the son of the Reverend Canon Thomas Bulman, a Church of England clergyman, and his wife Eveline. He was educated at Bedford School and then joined the Bank of England.

== First World War ==
Bulman transferred from the Honourable Artillery Company to the Royal Flying Corps (later Royal Air Force) early in the First World War, serving in No. 46 Squadron RFC and No. 3 Squadron RFC. He was awarded the Military Cross on 4 February 1918 for his services flying Sopwith Camels at the Battle of Courtrai, with the following citation:

For conspicuous gallantry and devotion to duty. On five occasions; in most difficult weather conditions, he dropped bombs and fired on enemy infantry from a low altitude, inflicting heavy casualties. During these flights he frequently obtained valuable information, and twice drove off enemy machines which attempted to interfere. He showed the greatest initiative and resource.

Bulman was appointed a flight commander on 24 February 1918 with the temporary rank of captain, although his substantive rank was still second lieutenant. Later that year, he was awarded the Air Force Cross (AFC).

== Between the wars ==
Appointed to a permanent RAF commission, Bulman served as a test pilot on the Sopwith Snipe and the S.E.5a, and then served at the Royal Aircraft Establishment, Farnborough, from 1919 to 1925. On 12 July 1920, he was awarded a Bar to his Air Force Cross for his services as a test pilot. He then held the rank of flying officer. He also undertook testing work for Blackburn and was one of the few pilots to fly the prototype Brennan helicopter in 1922. As a flight lieutenant, he was awarded a second Bar to his Air Force Cross in the 1922 Birthday Honours. In 1924, he won the Grove Prize for aeronautical research.

On 19 August 1925, Bulman resigned his permanent commission and transferred to the reserve as a flight lieutenant to become the chief test pilot at H. G. Hawker Engineering (later Hawker Aircraft) from 1925 to 1945 and became a director of the company in 1935. He became a close colleague of the company's chief designer, Sir Sydney Camm. He won several air races in the mid-1920s flying the Hawker Cygnet.

Bulman made the first flight for the Hawker Danecock (1925), Hawker Heron (1925), Hawker Horsley (1925), Hawker Hart (1928), Hawker Tomtit (1928), Hawker F.20/27 (1928), Hawker Demon (1933), Hawker Hurricane (1935), and Hawker Hector (1936), and also tested many other types.

== Second World War ==
During the Second World War, from 1941 to 1942, Bulman was head of the Aircraft Testing Branch of the British Air Commission in Washington, D.C., and was granted an honorary RAF commission as a group captain on 9 May 1941, relinquishing it on 23 August 1942. For this work, he was appointed a Commander of the Order of the British Empire (CBE) in the 1943 New Year Honours.

== Post-war ==
Bulman retired from Hawker in 1945 and never flew again, running his own business which had no relevance to aircraft. He finally resigned his RAF reserve commission on 10 February 1954.

== Family ==
Bulman married Constance Dorothy Wiseman in 1920. Their only child, Flying Officer Raymond Paul Bulman, was killed in action over Germany in 1945, aged 21, flying with No. 605 Squadron RAF.
