= Thomas M. Harries =

Scottish World War I flying ace

Thomas Montagu Harries
- Born: 16 October 1888; Menstrie, Clackmannanshire, Scotland
- Military career
- Allegiance: United Kingdom
- Branch: British Army; Royal Air Force
- Service years: 1917–1919
- Rank: Lieutenant
- Units: No. 45 Squadron RFC; No. 24 Squadron RAF
- Conflicts: World War I; Western Front
- Awards: Distinguished Flying Cross

Lieutenant Thomas Montagu Harries (born 16 October 1888) was a Scottish World War I flying ace credited with 11 aerial victories. He was the second scoring ace using the Sopwith 1½ Strutter; he then also became an ace on the Royal Aircraft Factory SE.5a.

== World War I ==
Harries was posted to No. 45 Squadron as an observer on Sopwith 1½ Strutter two-seater fighter aircraft, with the rank of corporal. On 9 May 1917, he was being piloted in Strutter serial number A963 when he used his gunnery skills to set a German Albatros D.III fighter afire in the sky west of Menin for his first victory. Three days later, he was credited with the capture of another Albatros, a reconnaissance aircraft, two miles east of Armentières. On 3 June, he destroyed another Albatros D.III southeast of Quesnoy. Then, on 7 July 1917, for his final victories in Strutter A963, he flamed an Albatros D.V and drove down two others out of control.

Harries then left No. 45 Squadron to train as a pilot, receiving the Royal Aero Club Aviator's Certificate No. 6141 on 30 November 1917. He was then posted to No. 24 Squadron as a SE.5a pilot. On 1 June 1918, he was commissioned as an officer, being appointed a temporary second lieutenant. On 8 August 1918, he resumed his winning ways, destroying an LVG reconnaissance plane over Meharicourt. Two days later, he joined Hilbert Bair, William C. Lambert and Wilfred Selwyn in driving down a Fokker D.VII out of control. On 19 August, he single-handedly drove another one down out of control over Fresnoy. On 30 August, he joined Bair and Horace Barton to share in the destruction of an Albatros reconnaissance two-seater, making Harries a double ace.

Harries scored his last victory on 29 October 1918, teaming with Walter H. Longton and H. V. Evans in the destruction of a German reconnaissance plane. He was awarded the Distinguished Flying Cross (DFC) for his heroics. The citation for his DFC was gazetted on 7 February 1919, and read:

2nd Lieutenant Thomas Montagu Harries (24th Squadron).

A fearless and gallant officer. On 12 October, whilst flying at 100 feet altitude, he observed 12 enemy machine guns in action. Diving, he attacked them, silencing eight, and compelling the other four to limber up and withdraw.

Harries remained in the Royal Air Force until 20 September 1919, at which time he was transferred to the unemployed list.
