= Hawker Woodcock =

British 1920s military aircraft

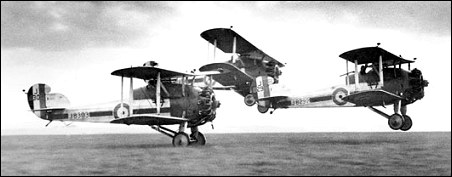
- Hawker Woodcocks from No. 3 Squadron

General information
- Type: Fighter
- National origin: United Kingdom
- Manufacturer: Hawker
- Designer: Capt. Thomson; George Carter
- Primary user: Royal Air Force
- Number built: 64

History
- Manufactured: 1925–1927
- Introduction date: 1925
- First flight: March 1923
- Variant: Hawker Danecock

The Hawker Woodcock was a British single-seat fighter built by the Hawker Engineering Company as the first fighter to be produced by Hawker Engineering (the successor to Sopwith Aviation). It was used by the Royal Air Force (RAF) as a night fighter in the 1920s.

== Design and development ==
The Hawker Woodcock was designed as a night fighter in 1922 to meet specification 25/22. The chief designer was Captain Thomson, and the prototype, serial number J6987, was first flown with a 358 hp (267 kW) Armstrong Siddeley Jaguar II engine in March 1923 with F. P. Raynham at the controls. It had a two-bay wing.

The prototype was rejected because of lack of manoeuvrability as well as suffering from serious wing flutter and ineffective rudder control, with spinning prohibited. Following the first flight George Carter took over as chief designer and changed the design, reducing the wingspan by 2 ft (61 cm) and making it a single-bay structure. The powerplant was changed to a 380 hp (280 kW) Bristol Jupiter IV engine. The modified design was called the Woodcock Mk II and first flew in August 1923, and after further modifications, was accepted for service with initial orders placed late in 1924. A number of accidents occurred in the early part of service, with the aircraft being prone to wing spar failures and collapse of the undercarriage but these structural weakness were cured by the end of 1925.

The Woodcock was armed with two .303 in (7.7 mm) Vickers machine guns, synchronised to fire through the propeller arc. The guns were mounted externally on each side of the fuselage, just below the edge of the cockpit. The first order for the RAF was for ten Woodcock IIs, with the first six being completed without any night flying equipment. The service eventually ordered a total of 62 aircraft. One of the first batch of aircraft was given a civil registration to allow it to be demonstrated in Scandinavia. On return to the United Kingdom, the demonstrator was entered into the 1925 King's Cup Air Race but it crashed during the race in bad weather near Luton.

== Operational history ==
The first aircraft to be delivered to the RAF entered service with 3 Squadron in May 1925 at RAF Upavon. 17 Squadron was the only other operational squadron, with first deliveries being made in March 1926. Once the type's early structural problems were solved, the Woodcock proved popular with its pilots. It was replaced by the Gloster Gamecock in 1928. Some Woodcocks were still flying in 1936. In June 1927 a Woodcock II of 17 Squadron was borrowed by the notable aviator Charles Lindbergh. He used the aircraft to fly back to Paris from London soon after his transatlantic flight in the Spirit of St. Louis.

== Variants ==
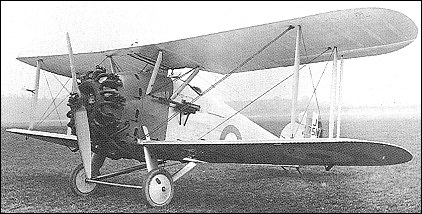
Hawker Woodcock Mk II

Woodcock Mk I
Single-seat night fighter prototype with two-bay equal-span wings and a 358hp Armstrong Siddeley Jaguar II engine, one built.
Woodcock Mk II
Single-seat night fighter for the RAF with a Bristol Jupiter IV engine and other design changes, One prototype and 62 production aircraft built.
Hawker Danecock
Single-seat fighter aircraft for Denmark with Jaguar IV engines and Madsen machine guns. Three aircraft were built.
L.B II Dankok
Single-seat fighter aircraft for the Danish Army Air Service, and the Danish Naval Air Service. Twelve built under licence at Danish Royal Naval Dockyard in Denmark.

== Operators ==
Denmark

- Danish Army Air Service
- Danish Naval Air Service

United Kingdom

- Royal Air Force
  - No. 3 Squadron RAF
  - No. 17 Squadron RAF

== Specifications (Woodcock Mk II) ==
Data from The British Fighter since 1912

General characteristics

- Crew: 1
- Length: 26 ft 2 in (7.98 m)
- Wingspan: 32 ft 6 in (9.91 m)
- Height: 9 ft 11 in (3.02 m)
- Wing area: 346 sq ft (32.1 m^{2})
- Empty weight: 2,014 lb (914 kg)
- Gross weight: 2,979 lb (1,351 kg)
- Fuel capacity: 50 imp gal (60 US gal; 230 L)
- Powerplant: 1 × Bristol Jupiter IV 9-cylinder radial engine, 425 hp (317 kW)

Performance

- Maximum speed: 141 mph (227 km/h, 123 kn) at sea level
- Cruise speed: 103 mph (166 km/h, 90 kn)
- Range: 280 mi (450 km, 240 nmi)
- Service ceiling: 22,500 ft (6,900 m)
- Time to altitude: 8.3 min to 10,000 ft (3,000 m)

Armament

- Guns: 2 × .303 in (7.7 mm) Vickers machine guns on sides of fuselage

== See also ==
Related lists

- List of aircraft of the Royal Air Force
