= John Stanley Chick =

Welsh officer of the Royal Air Force

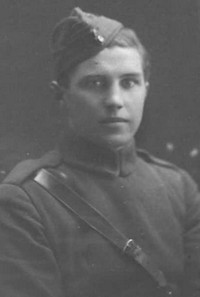
- Born: 22 December 1897; Pontardawe, Wales
- Died: 21 January 1960 (aged 62); Colchester, Essex, England
- Military career
- Branch: British Army; Royal Air Force
- Service years: 1914–1947
- Rank: Air Commodore
- Units: Royal Engineers; No. 11 Squadron RFC; No. 100 Squadron RAF; No. 24 Squadron RAF; No. 60 Squadron RAF; Royal Aircraft Establishment; High Speed Flight RAF; No. 203 Squadron RAF
- Commands: Cambridge University Air Squadron; No. 49 Squadron RAF; RAF Luqa
- Conflicts: World War I World War II
- Awards: Military Cross; Air Force Cross

Air Commodore John Stanley Chick, MC, AFC (22 December 1897 – 21 January 1960), was a Welsh officer of the Royal Air Force, who began his aviation career as a World War I flying ace credited with 16 aerial victories. He won the Grosvenor Challenge Cup in 1925 and was runner-up in the Daily Mail Light Aircraft Competition of 1926, both held at Lympne aerodrome in Kent. He was also an accomplished rugby player, winning caps for the RAF, Hampshire and the Harlequins.

== World War I service ==
John Stanley Chick began his military career as a pioneer in the Royal Engineers in 1914. He transferred to the Royal Flying Corps in February 1917 as a Cadet at Denham. He was commissioned a probationary second lieutenant on 3 May 1917. Chick was granted his pilots certificate, No. 4735, on 27 May 1917. In November 1917, he was assigned to No. 11 Squadron. Piloting a two-seater Bristol F.2 Fighter, he scored all his triumphs in the first four and half months of 1918. On 12 March 1918, he drove down out of control a German observation plane and four Fokker Dr.I fighters. All five triumphs were scored on a single sortie. On 1 April 1918, he was promoted to lieutenant. On 15 May, he ended his victory string by setting a German observation plane afire, destroying one Fokker Dr.I and driving another one down, and destroying a Pfalz D.III fighter. That same day, he was appointed flight commander, with the temporary rank of captain.

== Service between the wars ==
On 13 April 1919, as part of the postwar downsizing of the Royal Air Force, Chick gave up his rank of acting-captain. 1 August 1919 saw him appointed flying officer. On 8 October 1919, he was assigned pilot's duties with No. 100 Squadron RAF. Sixteen days later, he received a permanent commission as a flying officer. On 28 June 1920, he was posted to No. 24 Squadron RAF; later that year, on 7 December, he transferred to No. 60 Squadron RAF. In 1922, he was assigned to the Royal Aircraft Establishment at Farnborough as a test pilot, which included a stint on an aerobatic team that flew SE5.as. It was during this time, on 30 June 1923, that he was promoted to flight lieutenant. In 1926, he was posted to the newly created High Speed Flight at RAF Felixstowe. Chick then attended the Instructors Course at the Central Flying School and was rated A1. A tour of duty at the Central Flying School followed, beginning 22 June 1927. He rounded out the decade by leading the Central Flying School aerobatics team in 1929.

Beginning 19 January 1931, he attended the Royal Air Force Staff College. From there he was appointed a flight commander in No. 203 Squadron RAF on 23 January 1932, with the rank of squadron leader following closely on 1 February 1932. On 15 January 1934, he received his first command, Station Flight of Cambridge University Air Squadron at RAF Duxford. On 1 April 1937, he was promoted once again, to wing commander. Just before the start of World War II, in February 1939, Chick was appointed Officer Commanding No. 49 Squadron RAF.

== World War II service ==
He became a temporary group captain as of 1 June 1940. In 1941, Chick was selected to be Officer Commanding RAF Luqa. On 23 April 1942, he was assigned to Middle East Command. A promotion to acting air commodore followed on about 16 November 1942. The following year, on 21 February 1943, he was seconded for Special Duty.

== After World War II ==
John Stanley Chick retired effective 27 December 1947. In his retirement years, he became Civil Defence Officer for Colchester from 1951 through 1957.

== Honours and awards ==
Military Cross (MC)
T./2nd Lt. John Stanley Chick, Gen. List and R.F.C.
For conspicuous gallantry and devotion to duty. While leading a patrol of four machines over the enemy's lines he attacked an enemy two-seater machine, which his observer drove down completely out of control. Shortly afterwards the patrol engaged nineteen enemy machines; he dived on to the uppermost machine, and drove it down in a series of spins and side-slips completely out of control. He then attacked two others and brought them down in the same manner, while his observer drove down another out of control. On another occasion his formation, consisting of five machines, attacked twenty-five enemy aeroplanes. He destroyed one of the enemy, and drove down another out of control. He set a magnificent example of courage and skill.

Chick was awarded the Air Force Cross in the 1926 Birthday Honours.

== Bibliography ==
- Guttman, Jon (2007). Bristol F2 Fighter Aces of World War I. Aircraft of the Aces, No 79. illustrated by Harry Dempsey. Osprey Publishing. ISBN 978-1-84603-201-1.
