= Purdom =

Purdom is a surname. Notable people with the surname include:

- Charles Purdom (1883–1965), British author
- Edmund Purdom (1924–2009), British actor
- Thomas L. Purdom (1892–1927), Scottish World War I flying ace
- Tom Purdom (1936–2024), American writer
- William Purdom (1880–1921), British plant explorer
