= John Rutherford Gordon =

Australian First World War flying ace

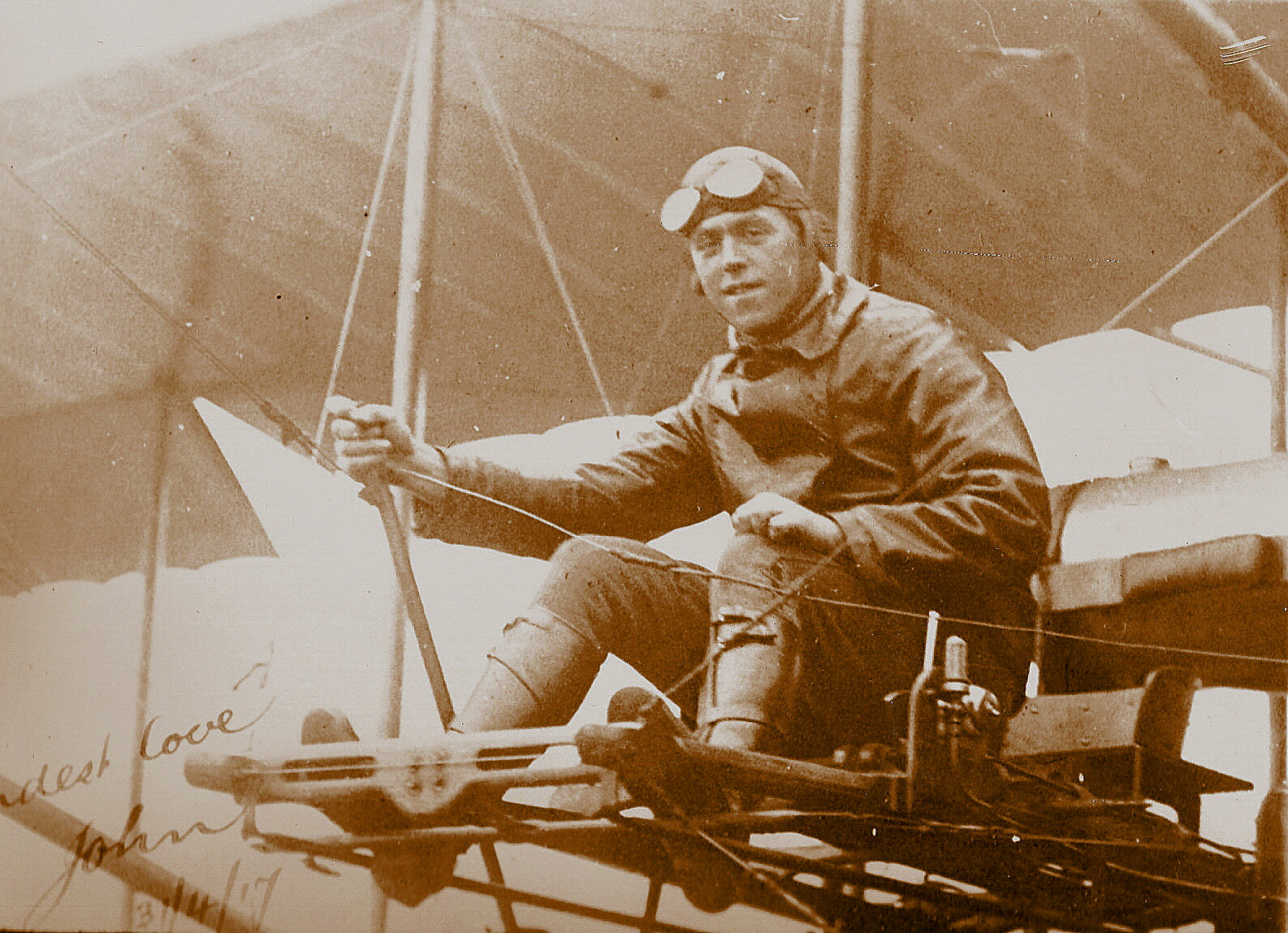
- Gordon at the controls of a Grahame-White "Boxkite", Point Cook, Victoria, 1917
- Born: 18 June 1895; Gilberton, Adelaide, South Australia
- Died: 11 December 1978 (aged 83); Daw Park, Adelaide, South Australia
- Burial place: Centennial Park Cemetery, Pasadena, South Australia
- Relatives: Sir David John Gordon (father); Douglas Peel Gordon (brother)
- Military career
- Allegiance: Australia
- Branch: Australian Army; Royal Australian Air Force
- Service years: 1914–1919; 1939–1945
- Rank: Wing Commander
- Nickname: Jack o'Gibralta
- Units: 10th Battalion, AIF; No. 62 Squadron RFC/RAF; No. 8 Training Squadron AFC; No. 3 Initial Training School, RAAF
- Conflicts: World War I; Gallipoli Campaign; Western Front; World War II
- Awards: Military Cross

Wing Commander John Rutherford Gordon MC (18 June 1895 – 11 December 1978) was an Australian First World War flying ace credited with fifteen aerial victories while serving as an observer/gunner in the Australian Flying Corps.

== Early life and background ==
Gordon was born in Gilberton, a suburb of Adelaide, South Australia, the son of the politician David John Gordon. He was brought up in Unley, and educated at Adelaide High School and St Peter's College. While at school he spent six years as a member of the Cadet Corps, and then a year as member of Citizens Forces, serving in the 74th Infantry Regiment. On the outbreak of the First World War in August 1914 he was working a clerk.

== World War I ==
On 20 August 1914 Gordon enlisted into the 10th Battalion at Morphettville, South Australia. On 28 August, on account of his previous military experience, he was promoted to the rank of acting sergeant, and this was confirmed on 1 September. On 20 October the 10th Battalion sailed from Adelaide aboard HMAT Ascanius (A11) eventually disembarking in Egypt. After further training the battalion sailed as part of the 3rd Brigade to the Greek island of Lemnos in early March 1915. Gordon, with the rest of 3rd Brigade, sailed from Lemnos on 24 April 1915, landing at Anzac Cove at Gallipoli early the following day. As a sergeant in No. 1 Section, No. 1 Platoon, "A" Company, Gordon served as a Battalion Scout and was amongst the first men ashore. He was transferred to the Machine Gun Section at the end of June, and was commissioned as a second lieutenant on 4 August.

On 20 August Gordon was invalided out of Galliopi, and was admitted to the New Zealand Stationary Hospital at Port Said, Egypt, on the 24th suffering from enteric fever. He was sent home to Australia to recuperate arriving there on 17 October aboard HMAT Ceramic. On 8 March 1916 he was passed as medically fit for duty and assigned to recruiting work.

On 26 April 1917 he applied to join the Australian Flying Corps, and on 1 May was appointed a second lieutenant in the AIF, allotted to the AFC. Gordon began pilot training at RAAF Point Cook, which he was unable to complete for medical reasons. However, on 21 June Gordon embarked aboard HMAT Suevic (A29) at Melbourne, and sailed for England, arriving at Liverpool on 26 August. On 4 September Gordon was posted to the AFC Depot at Halton Camp, and on 28 December was appointed a flying officer (observer).

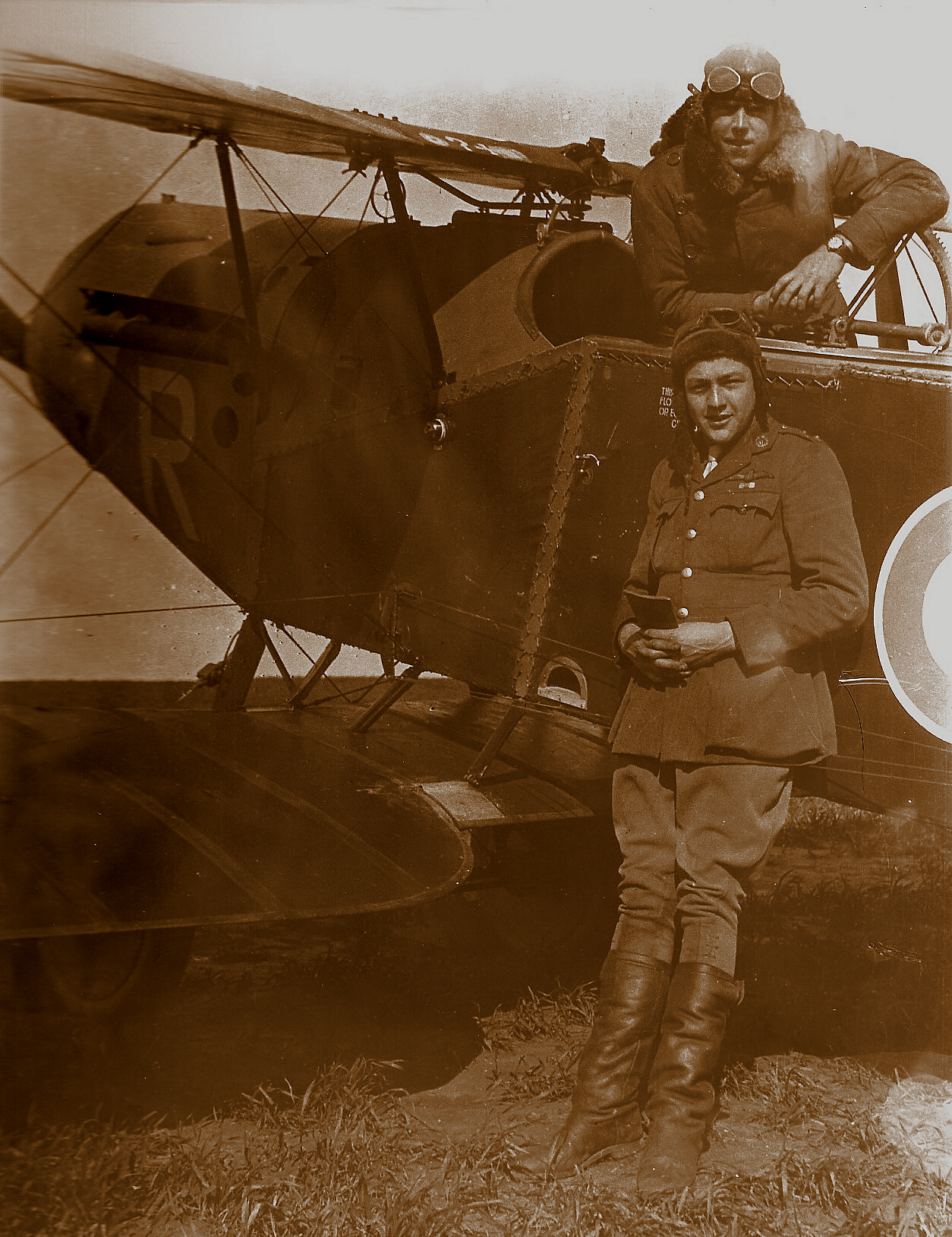
Gordon and Bill Staton (standing) with their Bristol Fighter, No. 62 Squadron RFC, Cachy, France, in 1918.

He was then attached to No. 62 Squadron, Royal Flying Corps, to fly in the Bristol F.2b two-seater fighter. No. 62 Squadron moved to France in January 1918, where Gordon was paired with Captain Bill Staton as his pilot. Gordon gained his first aerial victory (Staton's third) on 21 March 1918, and followed it with a triple victory on the 26th. Gordon was promoted to lieutenant on 28 March 1918. His fifth victory, which earned him "ace" status, came on 1 April. The next day Major-General John Salmond, Commander of the RAF in the Field, authorized his recommendation for the award of the Military Cross.

Staton and Gordon shared another victory with Captain Thomas L. Purdom and Lieutenant Percival Chambers on 21 April. Gordon went on to gain five more victories in May, and another four up to 8 June, for a total of fifteen. Gordon's award of the Military Cross was gazetted on 21 June 1918. His citation read:

Lieutenant John Rutherford Gordon, Australian Flying Corps, attached Royal Flying Corps.

"For conspicuous gallantry and devotion to duty when, as observer on an offensive patrol, he shot down and destroyed three hostile machines. Previous to this he had shot down two enemy triplanes, one of which crashed to the ground in flames. He has also effectively and repeatedly scattered massed bodies of enemy troops by accurate shooting from a height of 100 feet. His skill and daring have been of the highest order.

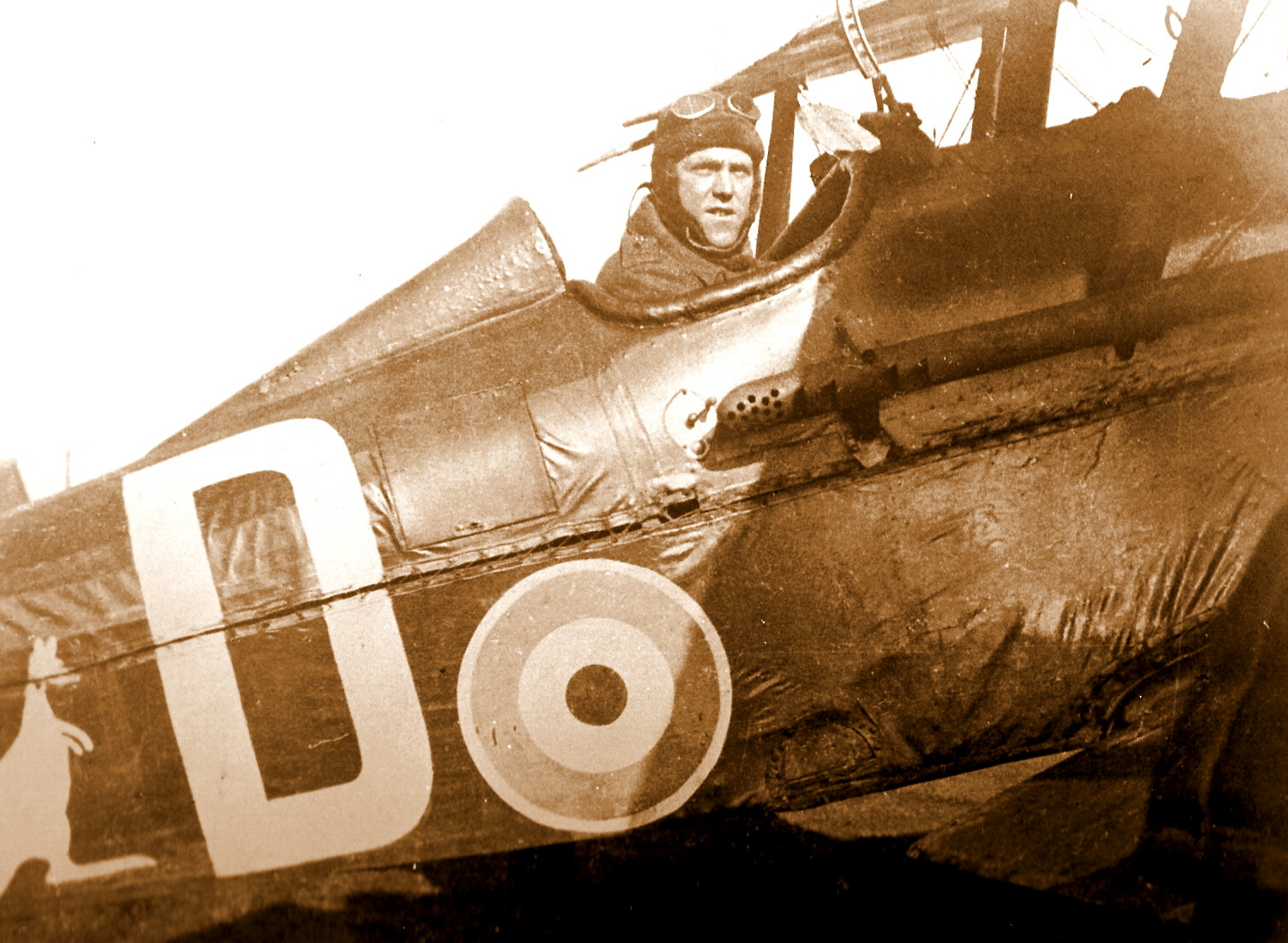
Gordon at the controls of his S.E.5a.

Gordon then returned to England recommence his pilot training, being posted to the No. 1 School of Military Aeronautics at Reading on 13 July, and later flying the Avro 504 and S.E.5a. He graduated in February 1919, and on 12 March was posted to No. 8 Training Squadron AFC. He returned to Australia on 14 June 1919 aboard the HMAT Kaiser-i-Hind, and his appointment to the AIF was terminated on 14 July.

== World War II ==
Gordon joined the Royal Australian Air Force in 1939, on the outbreak of the Second World War, with the rank of flight lieutenant, first serving as a recruiting officer in Adelaide, and subsequently taking the first intake of the Empire Air Training Scheme to Canada. Gordon was promoted from squadron leader to wing commander in February 1942, and served as the Commanding Officer of the No. 3 Initial Training School at Kingaroy, Queensland. He eventually retired from the RAAF on 3 July 1945.

== Death and memorial ==
Gordon died on 11 December 1978 at the Daw Park Repatriation Hospital after a long illness, being Australia's last surviving First World War ace. He is buried in Centennial Park Cemetery, Pasadena, South Australia.

In 1995 his son Bruce D. Gordon published The Flowers of the Forest, an essay in which he described the experiences of ten soldiers from No. 1 Section, No. 1 Platoon, "A" Company, 10th Battalion. These include his father, and also Arthur Seaforth Blackburn, two of only three of the ten that survived the war.

== Bibliography ==
- "B2455, Gordon, J. R. Service Records". National Archives of Australia.
