= Thomas Elliott (RAF officer) =

- Born: 17 March 1898; Gateshead, England
- Died: Unknown
- Military career
- Allegiance: United Kingdom
- Branch: British Army; Royal Air Force
- Service years: 1916–1919
- Rank: Second Lieutenant
- Units: No. 62 Squadron Royal Flying Corps, No. 62 Squadron RAF

Second Lieutenant Thomas Elliott (17 March 1898 – unknown) was a First World War British flying ace credited with eleven aerial victories, all while flying as an observer in the Bristol F.2 Fighter. The observer ace of Royal Air Force No. 62 Squadron scored the majority of his victories with George Everard Gibbons as pilot. Elliott later served as an instructor at an air gunnery school.

== Background ==
Thomas Elliott, son of Thomas Herbert Elliott and his wife Elizabeth, was born on 17 March 1898 in Gateshead in the north-east of England. At the time of the 1901 census, he resided at 9 Affleck Street in Gateshead with his parents, and the family continued to live there ten years later. Elliott was one of two children, and the only one to survive childhood. His father's occupation was recorded as lead manufacturer's agent. Prior to the war, Elliott was employed as a clerk with the firm of Raine and Company in Newcastle.

== Military career ==
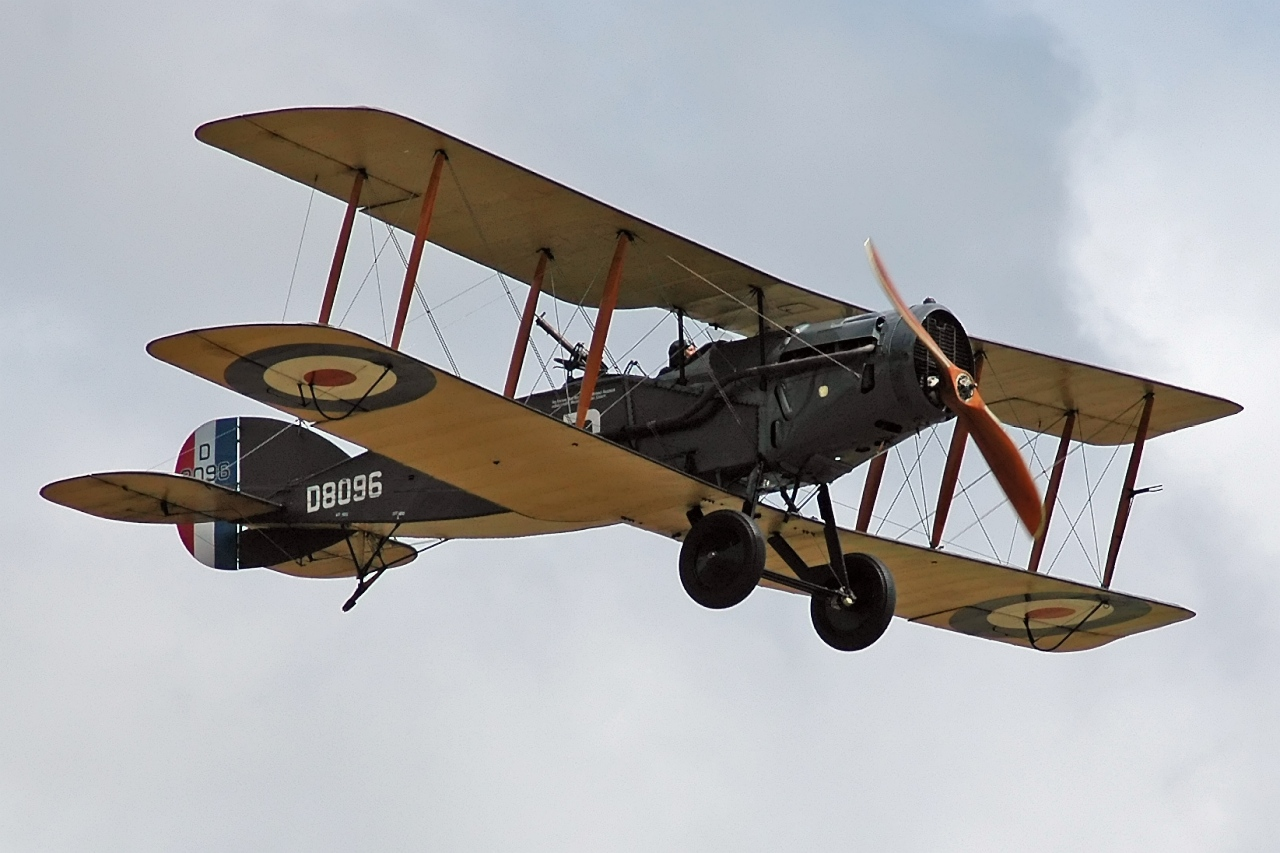
Elliott operated the Bristol F.2b Fighters while serving with No. 62 Squadron.

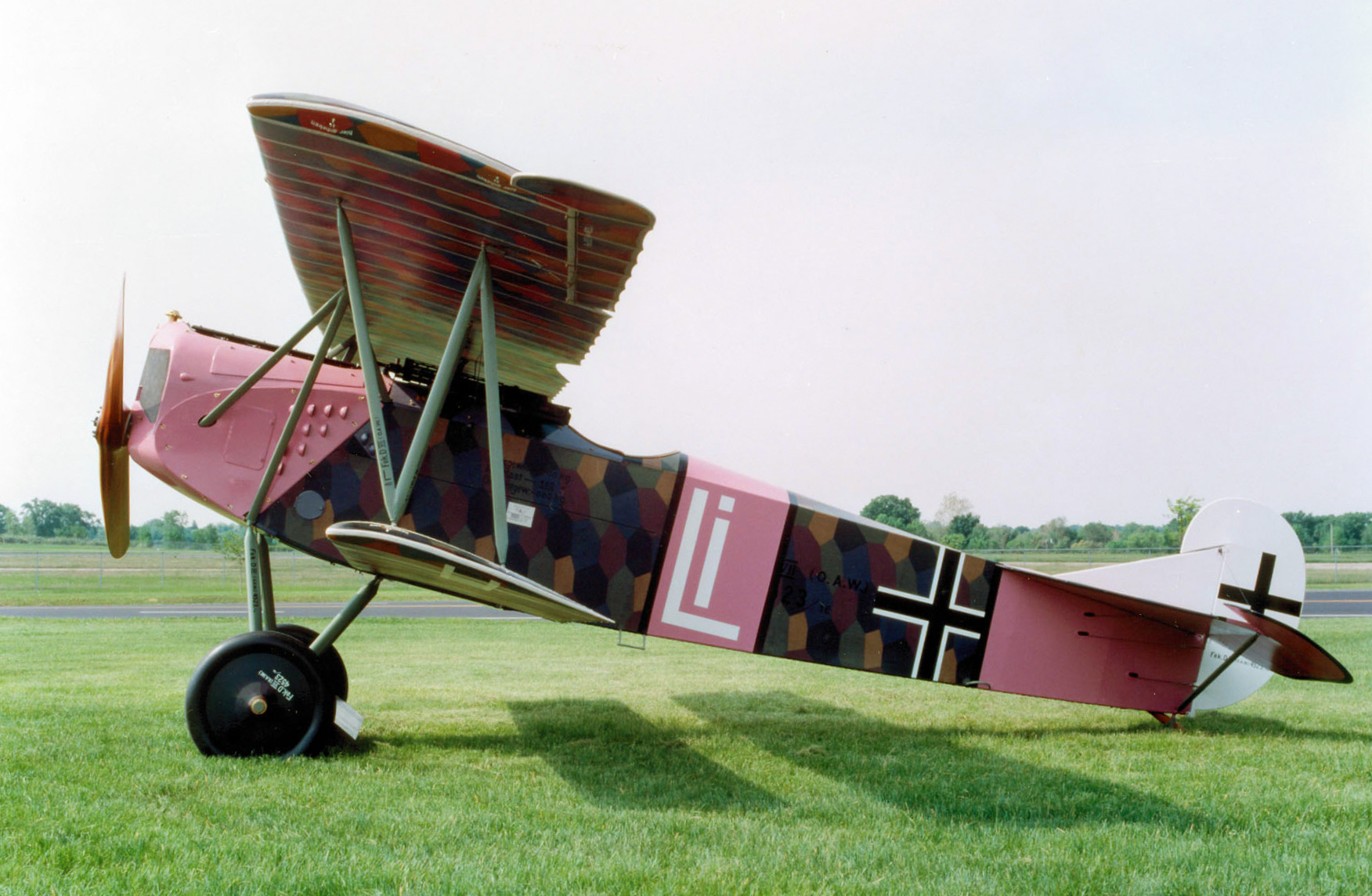
Seven of Thomas Elliott's victories were against the Fokker D.VII.

Elliott enlisted with the military in April 1916, and received his commission to the No. 62 Squadron of the Royal Flying Corps on 12 March 1918. The Squadron has recently deployed to France and Elliott arrived not long after his new unit began operations from the aerodrome at Serny. Elliott was credited with eleven aerial victories while he was with No. 62 Squadron of the Royal Air Force, all of them from the Bristol F.2b Fighter, and nine of them with George Everard Gibbons as pilot. Gibbons was a 17-victory ace who was awarded the Military Cross, Distinguished Flying Cross, and French Legion of Honour. Gibbons had scored his first eight victories with Sidney Arthur William Knights as observer. However, Knights was hospitalised on 10 July 1918 and then was posted to the School of Aviation. Later, he was transferred to the Royal Air Force Armament School at RAF Uxbridge at the estate of Hillingdon House in Hillingdon in Greater London. Elliott, therefore, was the replacement for Knights. In September 1918, Elliott was transferred to No. 1 School of Air Gunnery, where he served as an instructor. He relinquished his commission on 21 February 1919.

== List of aerial victories ==
Elliott's aerial victories were achieved while flying as an observer and are detailed below.

No.	Date/time	Aircraft	Foe	Result	Location	Pilot
1	22 May 1918 / 0800	Bristol F.2b (C4633)	LVG C	Destroyed	Northwest of Merville	William Swayze
2	1 August 1918	Bristol F.2b	Enemy Aircraft	Driven out of control	West of Douai	George Gibbons
3	3 August 1918	Bristol F.2b	Pfalz D.III	Driven out of control	North of Merville	George Gibbons
4	13 August 1918 / 1025	Bristol F.2b (E2457)	Two-seater	Destroyed	Bullecourt	George Gibbons
5	22 August 1918 / 0740	Bristol F.2b (E2457)	Fokker D.VII	Destroyed	West of Pronville	George Gibbons
6	22 August 1918 / 0741	Bristol F.2b (E2457)	Fokker D.VII	Destroyed in flames	West of Pronville	George Gibbons
7	1 September 1918 / 1330	Bristol F.2b (F2218)	Fokker D.VII	Destroyed in flames	East of Cambrai	C Allday
8	3 September 1918 / 1845	Bristol F.2b (E2457)	Fokker D.VII	Driven out of control	North of Cambrai	George Gibbons
9	3 September 1918 / 1845	Bristol F.2b (E2457)	Fokker D.VII	Driven out of control	North of Cambrai	George Gibbons
10	4 September 1918 / 0930	Bristol F.2b (E2457)	Fokker D.VII	Destroyed	Abancourt-N of Cambrai	George Gibbons
11	4 September 1918 / 0932	Bristol F.2b (E2457)	Fokker D.VII	Driven out of control	North of Cambrai	George Gibbons
