= Hugh Claye =

British flying ace

- Born: 22 June 1889; Derby, Derbyshire
- Died: 9 August 1972 (aged 83); Chichester, Sussex
- Military career
- Allegiance: United Kingdom
- Branch: British Army; Royal Air Force
- Service years: 1909–1918; 1941–1944
- Rank: Flight Lieutenant
- Nickname: Tubby
- Units: Sherwood Foresters; No. 62 Squadron RFC
- Conflicts: World War I World War II
- Awards: Military Cross; Efficiency Decoration

Hugh Claye MC, ED (22 June 1889 – 9 August 1972) was a British flying ace of World War I. In conjunction with his pilots he was credited with 11 aerial victories (four destroyed, seven 'driven down out of control') while flying as an observer/gunner in Bristol F.2 Fighter airplanes.

== Biography ==
Hugh Claye was the third son of Edgar Havelock Claye and Mary (née Pickthall) Claye, of Derby.

=== Infantry career ===
Claye was commissioned as a supernumerary second lieutenant in the 5th Battalion, The Sherwood Foresters (Nottinghamshire and Derbyshire Regiment) on 14 June 1909, and was brought into the Sherwood Foresters from the supernumerary list on 1 November 1909. He was promoted to lieutenant on 22 June 1912. On 21 May 1915, he was promoted to temporary captain. His commission was confirmed in the rank of captain in the Sherwood Foresters on 2 July 1916, with his date of seniority set at 1 June 1916.

=== Aerial service ===
Claye was transferred to No. 62 Squadron of the Royal Flying Corps in December 1917. He was paired with Captain Geoffrey Forrest Hughes as his pilot. The pair opened their victory list on 21 February 1918, destroying a German two-seater reconnaissance plane near Armentières. They would score 11 victories apiece in their dual career, the last being a Rumpler driven down out of control on 10 May 1918. Their final tally would be two enemy planes set on fire and destroyed, two more destroyed, and seven driven down 'out of control'. Their most notable success was sharing in the shooting down and wounding of Jasta 11's Lothar von Richthofen on 13 March, force-landing his Fokker Dr.I triplane

He was officially seconded to the RFC's General List on 16 March 1918, just before the RFC became the Royal Air Force. His rank of captain was confirmed in April, and back-dated to 27 January 1918 On 19 May 1918, Claye switched pilots to fly with Lieutenant H. A. Clarke. They were shot down by anti-aircraft fire, although Leutnant August Delling of Jasta 34 also staked an unsuccessful claim. Claye sat out the rest of the war as a prisoner of war, and was repatriated on 31 December 1918. He left the RAF on 10 April 1919 and retired to live with his wife. He retained an Honorary Captaincy in the Sherwood Foresters.

=== Inter war years ===
Claye obtained a postgraduate diploma in agriculture from Caius College, Cambridge in 1922. From 1922 until 1953 he was Assistant Registrary of Cambridge University, where he had studied before the war.

He was commissioned a Captain in the Territorial Army Reserve on 15 July 1922. The next notice of him was his assignment to the Senior Division of Cambridge University's Officers' Training Corps on 25 March 1930. On 30 March 1933, Claye was named as an executor of an estate. He resigned his commission on 24 April 1933. He was awarded the Efficiency Decoration by the King on 23 September 1933.

=== World War II and beyond ===
On 22 August 1940 Claye was commissioned as a probationary pilot officer in the Southern Rhodesian Air Force for the duration of hostilities, to serve in the RAF's Administrative and Special Duties Branch. He was confirmed in his appointment and promoted to the war substantive rank of flying officer a year later on 22 August 1941, receiving promotion to temporary flight lieutenant on 1 September 1942. He relinquished his commission on account of ill-health on 9 September 1944.

He was Chairman of Mobile Carpet Cleaners Ltd when it resolved to liquidate on 15 September 1950.

=== Family ===
On 26 January 1954, Claye was named a personal representative for the estate of his uncle, Wentworth Ernest Claye. On 2 November 1962, he was named a personal representative for the estate of his brother Charles Aked Claye. On 16 November 1967, Claye was again named a personal representative for an estate, this time for his sister, Marjorie McInnes Claye.

=== Death ===
Hugh Claye died near Chichester, Sussex on 9 August 1972, aged 83. He was survived by his widow Barbara, and son Michael and daughter Judith. His elder son Derek had died in a POW camp in Germany in September 1944.

== Bibliography ==
- Franks, Norman; Guest, Russell F. & Alegi, Gregory (1997). Above the War Fronts: The British Two-seater Bomber Pilot and Observer Aces, the British Two-seater Fighter Observer Aces, and the Belgian, Italian, Austro-Hungarian and Russian Fighter Aces, 1914–1918. London, UK: Grub Street. p. 4. ISBN 978-1-898697-56-5.
- Marsden, Barry M. (2003). Winged Warriors – Derbyshire Fighter Pilots in World War I. Ryestone Publications. ISBN 978-0-9509999-3-7.
