= William Norman Holmes =

- Born: 10 September 1896; Selby, Yorkshire, England
- Died: 21 December 1981 (aged 85); York, Yorkshire, England
- Military career
- Allegiance: United Kingdom
- Branch: Royal Air Force
- Rank: Sergeant
- Unit: No. 62 Squadron RAF
- Awards: Military Medal

Sergeant William Norman Holmes MM (10 September 1896 – 21 December 1981) was a British World War I flying ace credited with eight aerial victories.

Between 11 March and 8 July 1918, while serving as an observer/gunner in No. 62 Squadron RAF, flying the Bristol F.2b fighter, he accounted for eight enemy aircraft; one Fokker D.VII, three Fokker Dr.I and four Albatros D.V. For his first three victories his pilot was Second Lieutenant S. W. Symons, for the fourth and fifth, Sergeant Frank Johnson, and for the last three one each with Captain Thomas L. Purdom, Lieutenant Douglas Savage and Captain William Ernest Staton. He was awarded the Military Medal on 12 June 1918.
