= Charles Arnison =

British World War I flying ace

Charles Henry Arnison
- Born: 13 January 1893; Newcastle Upon Tyne, Northumberland, England
- Died: 4 September 1974 (aged 81); Hammersmith, London
- Military career
- Allegiance: United Kingdom
- Branch: Royal Flying Corps; Royal Air Force
- Service years: 1917–1920
- Rank: Lieutenant
- Unit: No. 62 Squadron RAF
- Conflicts: World War I World War II
- Awards: Military Cross

Lieutenant Charles Henry Arnison MC (13 January 1893 – 4 September 1974) was a British World War I flying ace credited with nine aerial victories. He won the Military Cross for valour in World War I, and returned to the RAF to serve in World War II.

== Early life ==
Charles Henry Arnison was born in Newcastle-on-Tyne on 13 January 1893.

== World War I ==
On 26 May 1917 Sergeant C. H. Arnison of the Territorial Force was commissioned as a second lieutenant and transferred to the General List of the Royal Flying Corps. On 28 June 1917 he was confirmed as a second lieutenant and appointed a flying officer.

By early 1918, he was assigned to 62 Squadron as a Bristol F.2 Fighter pilot; he began his victories with them with a win on 12 April 1918, and ran his string out at nine with his last victory on 15 May 1918. On both 6 and 20 June 1918 he was reported wounded in Flight magazine, although it is uncertain if this is a reference to two separate woundings. His exploits won him the Military Cross, gazetted 16 September 1918:

....He has destroyed four enemy aircraft and driven down four others completely out of control. He has always shown the greatest skill, keenness and gallantry, and has been largely instrumental in the fine achievements of his squadron.

He also won a Distinguished Flying Cross.

Arnison remained in the Royal Air Force after the war. On 28 October 1919 he was appointed as a Flight Lieutenant in the reorganized RAF. However, less than a year later, on 6 October 1920, he retired due to injuries, retaining his rank.

== World War II ==
On 25 January 1941, Arnison was commissioned as a probationary flying officer in the Royal Air Force Volunteer Reserve, and assigned to the Administrative and Special Duties Branch.

On 17 July 1941 he was reported wounded or injured in action in Flight magazine.

Post-war Arnison remained on the RAF List of Reserve Officers until relinquishing his commission on 11 May 1954.

== List of aerial victories ==
| No. | Date/time | Aircraft | Foe | Result | Location | Notes |
|---|---|---|---|---|---|---|
| 1 | 12 April 1918 @ 1420 hours | Bristol F.2 Fighter serial number C4859 | Albatros D.V fighter | Driven down out of control | East of Estaires | Observer/gunner: Samuel Parry |
| 2 | 21 April 1918 @ 1000 hours | Bristol F.2 Fighter s/n C4859 | Pfalz D.III fighter | Driven down out of control | Estaires-Lille | Observer/gunner: Samuel Parry |
| 3 | 21 April 1918 @ 1000 hours | Bristol F.2 Fighter s/n C4859 | Pfalz D.III fighter | Driven down out of control | Estaires-Lille | Observer/gunner: Samuel Parry |
| 4 | 3 May 1918 @ 1115 hours | Bristol F.2 Fighter s/n C4859 | Albatros D.V fighter | Driven down out of control | East of Armentières | Observer/gunner: Samuel Parry |
| 5 | 3 May 1918 @ 1116 hours | Bristol F.2 Fighter s/n C4859 | Albatros D.V fighter | Driven down out of control | East of Armentières | Observer/gunner: Samuel Parry |
| 6 | 3 May 1918 @ 1117 hours | Bristol F.2 Fighter s/n C4859 | Albatros D.V fighter | Destroyed by fire | East of Armentières | Observer/gunner: Samuel Parry killed in action |
| 7 | 9 May 1918 | Bristol F.2 Fighter s/n C4859 | Pfalz D.III fighter | Destroyed | South of Herlies | Observer/gunner: Horace Ernest Merritt |
| 8 | 9 May 1918 | Bristol F.2 Fighter s/n C4859 | Pfalz D.III fighter | Driven down out of control | Northeast of La Bassée | Observer/gunner: Horace Ernest Merritt |
| 9 | 15 May 1918 @ 1745 hours | Bristol F.2 Fighter s/n C4859 | German reconnaissance plane | Destroyed | Albert-Ayette | Observer/gunner: C. D. Wells |
