= Sidney Knights =

English World War I flying ace

Sidney Arthur William Knights
- Born: 1898; Lavender Hill, London, England
- Died: 1 April 1968 (aged 69–70); Bury St Edmunds, Suffolk, England
- Military career
- Allegiance: United Kingdom
- Branch: British Army; Royal Air Force
- Service years: 1916–1919
- Rank: Lieutenant
- Units: York and Lancaster Regiment; No. 62 Squadron RFC/RAF
- Conflicts: World War I; Western Front
- Awards: Military Cross

Lieutenant Sidney Arthur William Knights MC (1898 – 1 April 1968) was an English World War I flying ace credited with eight aerial victories.

== Military service ==
Knights was commissioned from cadet into the York and Lancaster Regiment as a temporary second lieutenant (on probation) on 7 July 1916. He served in France with the 13th Battalion, winning the Military Cross, which was gazetted on 13 December. His citation read:

Temporary Second Lieutenant Sidney Arthur William Knights, York and Lancaster Regiment.

"For conspicuous gallantry in action. During a raid on the enemy's trenches he showed marked courage and determination in leading his men. He set a splendid example throughout."

He was promoted to lieutenant on 7 January 1918, and soon moved to the Royal Flying Corps, being appointed a flying officer (observer) and transferred to the RFC General List on 16 March 1918, with seniority backdated to 27 January.

Knights was posted to No. 62 Squadron on 10 March 1918, and served as observer/gunner with pilot George Everard Gibbons, flying a Bristol F.2b two-seater fighter. Between 12 March and 28 May they accounted for eight enemy aircraft, including three on 3 May and two on 28 May. Knights was hospitalized on 10 July 1918, and saw no further successes.

Knights left the RAF post-war, being transferred to the unemployed list on 14 March 1919.
