= George Everard Gibbons =

British World War I flying ace (1896–1923)

- Born: 15 February 1896; Dudley, Worcestershire, England
- Died: 20 March 1923 (aged 27); Stourbridge, Worcestershire, England
- Military career
- Allegiance: United Kingdom
- Branch: British Army; Royal Air Force
- Service years: 1914–1919
- Rank: Captain
- Units: South Staffordshire Regiment; North Staffordshire Regiment; No. 20 Squadron RFC; No. 62 Squadron RFC/RAF
- Awards: Military Cross; Distinguished Flying Cross

Captain George Everard Gibbons MC, DFC (15 February 1896 – 20 March 1923) was a British World War I flying ace credited with 18 aerial victories gained while flying a Bristol F.2 Fighter in 1918. Both of his observers, Sidney Knights and Thomas Elliott, also became aces flying with him. Gibbons' final tally consisted of three enemy aircraft destroyed by fire, five others destroyed, and ten driven down out of control.

== Military service ==
Gibbons enlisted in the 6th Battalion of the South Staffordshire Regiment on 2 September 1914, and was commissioned as a temporary second lieutenant on 23 February 1915. He transferred to the North Staffordshire Regiment, and was promoted to lieutenant on 12 June 1916. He joined the Royal Flying Corps on 15 November 1916 to serve as an observer in No. 20 Squadron, and after pilot training was appointed a flying officer on 6 September 1917.

In early 1918 he joined No. 62 Squadron, flying the Bristol F.2, and with observer Lt. Sidney Knights, gained his first victory on 12 March, driving down a Fokker Dr.I 'out of control' near Nauroy, and sent down another enemy aircraft on 17 March. On 21 March 1918 he was appointed a flight commander with the rank of temporary captain, and then gained "flying ace" status on 3 May by accounting for three Albatros D.V fighters north of Armentières. His sixth victory came on 22 May, and then two more on the 28th. Gibbons, flying with observer 2nd Lt. Thomas Elliott, scored five more victories in August, and four more in September over Cambrai, with two each on the 3rd and 4th of the month.

Towards the end of the war, he was posted to Home Establishment. Gibbons finally left the RAF, being transferred to the unemployed list on 15 April 1919.

He died in Stourbridge, Worcestershire, on 20 March 1923.

== Honours and awards ==
Military Cross
Temporary Captain George Everard Gibbons, General List and R.A.F.

For conspicuous gallantry and devotion to duty. He has lately destroyed three enemy machines and driven down others out of control. He has always shown great gallantry and keenness, and has commanded his flight with distinction, performing invaluable services in training young officers in the squadron.

Distinguished Flying Cross
Lieutenant (Acting Captain) George Everard Gibbons, MC.

On 4 August, when leading a patrol, his formation was attacked by twenty enemy aeroplanes. Seeing one of our Bristol fighters, in difficulties with its propeller, being attacked by one of the enemy machines, he dived and drove it down to crash; when climbing back to join his formation his observer shot down another enemy machine. In addition to the foregoing Captain Gibbons has destroyed four enemy aeroplanes and driven down three out of control. The gallantry in action he invariably displays sets an inspiriting example to those with whom he serves.

== Bibliography ==
- Guttman, Jon & Dempsey, Harry (2007). Bristol F2 Fighter Aces of World War I. Osprey Publishing. ISBN 978-1-84603-201-1.
