= Geoffrey Forrest Hughes =

Australian aviator and flying ace of the First World War

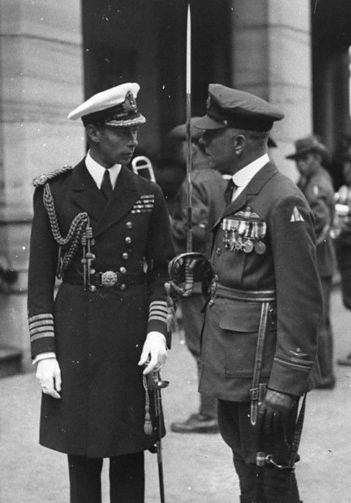
- Geoffrey Hughes (right) speaking with Prince Albert during the latter's tour of Australia in 1927.
- Born: 12 July 1895; Darling Point, New South Wales
- Died: 13 September 1951 (aged 56); Lewisham, New South Wales
- Burial place: Waverley Cemetery
- Relatives: Thomas Hughes (father); Tom Hughes (son); Robert Hughes (son); Lucy Turnbull (granddaughter)
- Military career
- Allegiance: Australia; United Kingdom
- Branch: Australian Army; Royal Flying Corps; Royal Australian Air Force
- Service years: 1914–1919; 1940–1943
- Rank: Group Captain
- Conflicts: First World War; Second World War
- Awards: Military Cross; Air Force Cross; Mentioned in Despatches (2)

Geoffrey Forrest Hughes, MC, AFC (12 July 1895 – 13 September 1951) was an Australian aviator and flying ace of the First World War. He was credited with 11 aerial victories, and won a Military Cross for his valour. After a postwar award of the Air Force Cross, he returned to Australia and completed university. He became a businessman and a solicitor in the family law firm while retaining his interests in aviation. From 1925 through 1934, he was president of the Royal Aero Club of New South Wales, and largely responsible for government support of the club. Despite his business concerns, he returned to military duty during the Second World War. He commanded an aviation training school and rose to the rank of group captain before surrendering his commission in April 1943. After the war ended, he moved into public life and the political realm.

== Early life ==
Geoffrey Forrest Hughes was born in the Sydney suburb of Darling Point on 12 July 1895. He was the second son of Thomas Hughes, a solicitor and future Lord Mayor of Sydney, and Louisa (née Gilhooley); he was of Irish descent on both sides, with roots in County Roscommon. Hughes received his secondary education at Saint Ignatius' College, Riverview, before undertaking a Bachelor of Arts degree at the University of Sydney from 1914. In June that year, he was commissioned as an officer in the 26th Infantry Regiment, Citizens Military Force. In his youth, Hughes had acquired a keen interest in aviation, which led him to apply for the Australian Flying Corps; his application was unsuccessful.

== First World War ==
In March 1916, Hughes suspended his studies and travelled to the United Kingdom, where he enlisted in the Royal Flying Corps and was commissioned a second lieutenant on 3 June. He was posted for flight instruction, and on graduating as a pilot was made a flying officer on 28 July. Later that year, Hughes was posted to No. 10 Squadron RFC in France. Piloting Armstrong Whitworth F.K.8 biplanes, the unit carried out co-operation duties with the Allied ground troops over the Western Front. Around the same time Hughes had enlisted in the Royal Flying Corps, his elder brother, Roger Forrest Hughes, was granted a commission in the Australian Army Medical Corps of the Australian Imperial Force. Posted for service on the Western Front, he was mortally wounded by an artillery shell in the morning of 11 December 1916; Geoffrey was with Roger when the latter died of his wounds later that day.

On completing his tour with No. 10 Squadron, Hughes returned to the United Kingdom in February 1917. For the following ten months, he was posted for duties at flight training installations and units in England. He was promoted to temporary captain on 29 July. During this time, his letters home to his parents were critical of anti-conscription efforts by Australian Roman Catholics, led by Archbishop Mannix.

In 1918, he returned to France in an assignment to fly a Bristol F.2 Fighter for No. 62 Squadron RFC. On 17 February, he and Hugh Claye were first into combat for the new squadron; four days later, they scored the unit's first victory. The team of Hughes and Claye continued to accrue victories; they became aces in a notable air battle on 13 March 1918. They were leading a formation of 11 Bristol Fighters when they were sucked into a lopsided battle to save a squadronmate. Despite bucking combat odds of about four to one, Hughes and Claye were credited with two of 62 Squadron's six victories that day. Hughes was promoted to captain on 1 April 1918. He was mentioned in despatches twice, and awarded the Military Cross, which was gazetted on 13 May 1918:

...While leading his formation over the enemy's lines he was attacked by twelve enemy machines, two of which he shot down. On the following day, when in charge of a patrol, he attacked seven enemy triplanes, drove down one out of control, and forced three others to land. On another occasion, while in charge of a patrol, he was attacked by a large number of enemy scouts; owing to his skilful flying his observer succeeded in shooting down one of the enemy machines, which broke up in the air. He always showed the greatest coolness and courage in action, and, as a flight commander, led his formation with splendid courage and determination.

Hughes was again withdrawn to training duties in England.

== List of aerial victories ==
See also Aerial victory standards of World War I

Unconfirmed victories denoted "u/c".

No.	Date/time	Aircraft	Foe	Result	Location	Notes
1	21 February 1918	Bristol F.2b Fighter	German two-seater	Destroyed	Vicinity of Armentières, France	Observer/gunner: Hugh Claye
2	10 March 1918	Bristol F.2b Fighter	Albatros D.V	Destroyed		Observer/gunner: Hugh Claye
3	10 March 1918	Bristol F.2b Fighter	Albatros D.V	Driven down out of control		Observer/gunner: Hugh Claye
4	11 March 1918	Bristol F.2b Fighter	Fokker Triplane	Driven down out of control		Observer/gunner: Hugh Claye
u/c	11 March 1918	Bristol F.2b Fighter	Fokker Triplane	Forced to land		Observer/gunner: Hugh Claye
u/c	11 March 1918	Bristol F.2b Fighter	Fokker Triplane	Forced to land		Observer/gunner: Hugh Claye
u/c	11 March 1918	Bristol F.2b Fighter	Fokker Triplane	Forced to land		Observer/gunner: Hugh Claye
5	13 March 1918 @ 1030 hours	Bristol F.2b Fighter	Pfalz D.III	Driven down out of control; pilot hit	East of Cambrai, France	Observer/gunner: Hugh Claye
6	13 March 1918 @ 1030 hours	Bristol F.2b Fighter	Fokker Triplane	Destroyed	East of Cambrai, France	Observer/gunner: Hugh Claye; victory over Lothar von Richthofen shared with Augustus Orlebar in a Sopwith Camel
7	12 April 1918 @ 1420 hours	Bristol F.2b Fighter	Albatros D.V	Driven down out of control	South of Bois du Biez	Observer/gunner: Hugh Claye
8	12 April 1918 @ 1500 hours	Bristol F.2b Fighter	LVG two-seater	Set afire in midair; destroyed	Auchy-les-Mines, France	Observer/gunner: Hugh Claye
9	22 April 1918 @ 1030 hours	Bristol F.2b Fighter	Fokker D.VII	Driven down out of control	Nieppe Forest	Observer/gunner: Hugh Claye
10	22 April 1918 @ 1030 hours	Bristol F.2b Fighter	Fokker D.VII	Driven down out of control	Nieppe Forest	Observer/gunner: Hugh Claye
11	10 May 1918 @ 1835 hours	Bristol F.2b Fighter	Rumpler two-seater	Driven down out of control	Between Combles and Péronne, France	Observer/gunner: Hugh Claye

== Between the World Wars ==
Hughes remained in England for some time following war's end, training recruits. On 3 June 1919, his award of the Air Force Cross was gazetted.

After discharge from military duty, Hughes completed his Bachelor of Arts at the University of Sydney, graduating in 1920. He married Margaret Sealy Vidal, an Anglican and the daughter of an English cleric, at Saint Canice's Church, Darlinghurst on 8 January 1923. Hughes went on to receive a Bachelor of Laws degree with Second Class honours on 17 May 1923. He became a solicitor and joined the family legal firm. His son, Robert (1938–2012), was an influential art critic.

Geoffrey Hughes maintained his interest in aviation, becoming president of the Royal Aero Club of New South Wales from 1925 through to 1934. He was instrumental in gaining government support for the club, on grounds that it would supply pilots for the military as well as civil use. He was one of three members of a Committee of Inquiry into the forced landing of the Kookaburra during a long-distance flight on 29 March 1929. The committee's report, issued on 25 June 1929, besides exploring the causes of the accident, also contained recommendations for better radio communications and sufficient onboard emergency rations for crew survival in future mishaps. On 5 September 1936, it was reported by The Sydney Morning Herald that Hughes became a director of the United Insurance Co Limited.

== Second World War and beyond ==
In July 1940, Hughes returned to military service, being appointed as a flying officer in the Royal Australian Air Force. On 13 August 1940, he was appointed to fill a vacant seat on the board of directors of Commercial Banking Company of Sydney. Ranked as a temporary wing commander in 1941, he commanded the flying school at Narrandera. By the time he gave up his commission in April 1943 to end his military career, he had risen to act group captain.

== Business and public career ==
Hughes became a prominent businessman, with connections to companies in which his father had an interest. The younger Hughes became a director of United Insurance Company, Commercial Banking Company of Sydney, and Australia Hotel Company Ltd, as well as chairman of Tooheys Ltd and Tooheys Standard Securities Ltd. He was chairman of directors for Tooheys Brewery, as well as senior partner in the family law firm of Hughes, Hughes, and Garvin. His business interests led him into political life as an opponent of the bank nationalisation policies of postwar Prime Minister Ben Chifley. Hughes refused to serve on the board of Qantas Empire Airways Ltd. Elsewhere in the sphere of public life, he became a council member of Sancta Sophia College. He became a member of the socially prominent Australian Club, as well as the Royal Sydney Golf Club.

== Death ==
Geoffrey Forrest Hughes died of lung cancer and pneumonia in Lewisham Hospital on 13 September 1951, at age 56. His wife, daughter, and three sons survived him. He was buried in the Catholic section of Waverley Cemetery.

== Archival and Online Collections ==
- Geoffrey Forrest Hughes diary, 1919, available online at the State Library of New South Wales, MLMSS 1222/Box 6/Item 6
- Geoffrey Forrest Hughes diary, 1918, available online at the State Library of New South Wales, MLMSS 1222/Box 6/Item 5
- Geoffrey Forrest Hughes diary, 1917, available online at the State Library of New South Wales, Item 04: Geoffrey Forrest Hughes diary, 1917
- Geoffrey Forrest Hughes diary, 1913, available online MLMSS 1222/Box 6/Item 3
- Personal papers of Geoffrey Hughes, 1901–1944, State Library of New South Wales, MLMSS 1222/vol. 4/pp. 31-132
