= Thomas L. Purdom =

Scottish WWI flying ace (1892–1927)

Thomas Laurence Purdom
- Born: 24 June 1892; Hawick, Roxburghshire, Scotland
- Died: 8 March 1927 (aged 34); Hawick, Roxburghshire, Scotland
- Burial place: Wellogate Cemetery
- Military career
- Allegiance: United Kingdom
- Branch: British Army; Royal Air Force
- Service years: 1914–1919
- Rank: Captain
- Units: King's Own Scottish Borderers; No. 15 Squadron RFC; No. 62 Squadron RAF
- Conflicts: World War I • Western Front
- Awards: Military Cross

Captain Thomas Laurence Purdom MC (24 June 1892 – 8 March 1927) was a Scottish World War I flying ace credited with 13 confirmed aerial victories.

== Early life and entry into military ==
Purdom was born in Hawick, Roxburghshire, the son of John R. Purdom, a solicitor and joint Town Clerk. Purdom was working in his father's office when war was declared and enlisted into the Public Schools Battalion. However, he was soon commissioned, becoming as a second lieutenant in the 4th (The Border) Battalion, The King's Own Scottish Borderers on 14 October 1914.

== Aerial service ==
In 1915, Purdom was seconded to the Royal Flying Corps, receiving Royal Aero Club Aviators' Certificate No. 1873 after soloing a Maurice Farman biplane at the Military School, Birmingham, on 11 October 1915, and was appointed a flying officer on 18 January 1916.

He served in No. 15 Squadron throughout 1916, flying a B.E.2c two-seater reconnaissance aircraft, but had no successes in combat, as his unit was mainly engaged in such duties as artillery spotting and aerial photography.

Purdom was appointed a flight commander with the temporary rank of captain on 20 September 1916, and was transferred to the newly formed No. 62 Squadron, a training unit. In May 1917, the squadron received the Bristol F.2 Fighter, and in January 1918 was sent to France.

Success in the air finally came with a double victory on 21 March 1918, and with another on the 24th and two on the 26th, made Purdom and his gunner/observer Lieutenant Percival Chambers aces within a week. They continued to score and became double aces on 15 May. Two days later, they completed their dozen victories together with another double victory over Armentières. They had destroyed five enemy aircraft, including one shared with William Ernest Staton and John Rutherford Gordon. Their other eight victories were of the "driven down out of control" category. On 19 May 1918, Purdom and gunner William Norman Holmes drove a Fokker D.VII down out of control north-west of Douai. This was Purdom's thirteenth victory, and Holmes' sixth.

In June 1918, Purdom was awarded the Military Cross. His citation read:

Lieutenant (Temporary Captain) Thomas Laurence Purdom, KOSB and RFC.

"For conspicuous gallantry and devotion to duty. He attacked and shot down a hostile scout, and when himself attacked by a second scout, he shot the latter down out of control also. He has in addition to these destroyed four enemy machines within a month. He has shown the most exceptional gallantry and daring in engaging enemy aircraft."

Purdom returned to the Home Establishment in July 1918, after being injured, and was posted to the Aeroplane Experimental Station at Martlesham Heath on 15 September 1918. He eventually left the RAF, being transferred to the unemployed list on 19 February 1919.

Purdom was promoted to captain in his regiment, the King's Own Scottish Borderers, on 21 March 1919.

== After the war ==
Purdom was an enthusiastic motorist. He worked as an engineer at Croall & Croall, an early automobile manufacturer in Edinburgh. After a brief illness, he died in 1927 in Hawick, where he was interred at Wellogate Cemetery.

=== List of aerial victories ===
Combat record
No.	Date/ Time	Aircraft/ Serial No.	Opponent	Result	Location	Notes
1	21 March 1918	Bristol F.2b	Albatros D.V	Destroyed		Observer: Lt. Percival Chambers
2	21 March 1918	Bristol F.2b	Albatros D.V	Driven down out of control		Observer: Lt. Percival Chambers
3	24 March 1918	Bristol F.2b	Albatros D.V	Destroyed in flames		Observer: Lt. Percival Chambers
4	26 March 1918	Bristol F.2b	Enemy aircraft	Destroyed		Observer: Lt. Percival Chambers
5	26 March 1918	Bristol F.2b	Enemy aircraft	Driven down out of control		Observer: Lt. Percival Chambers
6	28 March 1918; 1005	Bristol F.2b	Enemy aircraft	Driven down out of control	Sailly	Observer: Lt. Percival Chambers
7	21 April 1918; 0945	Bristol F.2b	Albatros D.V	Destroyed	South-east of Estaires	Observer: Lt. Percival Chambers. Shared with 2nd Lt. William Staton & Lt. John Gordon.
8	3 May 1918; 1100	Bristol F.2b (B1216)	Albatros C	Destroyed	North of Merville	Observer: Lieutenant Percival Chambers
9	3 May 1918; 1100	Bristol F.2b (B1216)	Albatros D.V	Driven down out of control	South of Armentières	Observer: Lieutenant Percival Chambers
10	15 May 1918; 1745	Bristol F.2b (B1216)	Type C	Destroyed	Pozières	Observer: Lieutenant Percival Chambers
11	17 May 1918; 1045	Bristol F.2b (B1216)	Fokker D.VII	Driven down out of control	Armentières	Observer: Lieutenant Percival Chambers
12	17 May 1918; 1045	Bristol F.2b (B1216)	Type C	Driven down out of control	Armentières	Observer: Lieutenant Percival Chambers
13	19 May 1918; 1815	Bristol F.2b	Fokker D.VII	Driven down out of control	North-west of Douai	Observer: Sgt. William Norman Holmes

== See also ==
- List of World War I aces credited with 11–14 victories

== Bibliography ==
- Shores, Christopher F.; Franks, Norman & Guest, Russell F. (1990). Above the Trenches: a Complete Record of the Fighter Aces and Units of the British Empire Air Forces 1915–1920. London, UK: Grub Street. ISBN 978-0-948817-19-9.
