= William Staton =

British airman

William Ernest Staton
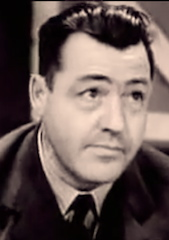
- Staton in the British Second World War propaganda film, Target for Tonight (1941)
- Born: 27 August 1898; Tutbury, Staffordshire, England
- Died: 22 July 1983 (aged 84); Emsworth, Hampshire, England
- Military career
- Allegiance: United Kingdom
- Branch: British Army (1916–18); Royal Air Force (1918–52)
- Service years: 1916–1952
- Rank: Air Vice Marshal
- Nicknames: Bull, King Kong
- Units: Artists Rifles (1916–17); No. 62 Squadron RFC/RAF (1918–19); No. 20 Squadron RAF (1920–22); No. 205 Squadron RAF (1931–34); No. 501 Squadron AAF (1934–35); No. 76 Squadron RAF (1938)
- Commands: Central Bomber Establishment, RAF Marham (1947–49); No. 46 (Transport) Group (1945–47); RAF Leeming (1940–41); No. 10 Squadron RAF (1938–40)
- Conflicts: First World War: Western Front; Second World War
- Awards: Companion of the Order of the Bath; Distinguished Service Order & Bar; Military Cross; Distinguished Flying Cross & Bar; Mentioned in Despatches (2); War Cross (Czechoslovakia)
- Other work: ADC to the King, Olympics participant

Air Vice Marshal William Ernest Staton, CB, DSO & Bar, MC, DFC & Bar (27 August 1898 – 22 July 1983) was a British airman who began his career as a First World War flying ace credited with 26 victories. He was transferred to the Royal Air Force (RAF) on its creation in 1918 and remained in the RAF during the inter-war years. During the Second World War he served in England and pioneered the bombing technique of using pathfinders to mark targets. He then served in the Far East before becoming a prisoner of war to the Japanese. After the war he returned to Great Britain and the RAF where he reached air rank and twice captained the British Olympic Shooting Team.

== Early life and education ==
Staton was born in Tutbury, Staffordshire, a village 5 miles (8.0 km) north of Burton upon Trent where was educated at Guild Street School and the Science School.

== First World War ==
Staton began his military service as a private in the Artists Rifles in 1916, a volunteer battalion popular with graduates of Britain's public schools and universities. About two thirds of the 15,000 men who passed through the battalion in World War I became officers somewhere in the British military. Staton passed from the ranks of the Artists Rifles to a cadet's position in the Royal Flying Corps, and was commissioned as a temporary second lieutenant (on probation) on 4 May 1917. He was appointed a flying officer with the effective rank of second lieutenant on 21 September 1917. Staton was posted to No. 62 Squadron RFC at the end of flying training early in 1918.

On 13 March 1918, twelve Bristol F.2b two-seater fighters of No. 62 Squadron inadvertently engaged at least thirty German fighters south-east of Cambrai, France. Staton was piloting one of the Bristols with Lieutenant Horace E. Merritt as his observer, and he claimed his first two aerial victories. He then flamed a Fokker Dr.I on 21 March, and scored a triple triumph on 26 March to become an ace. He was promoted to temporary lieutenant on 1 April on the same day the Royal Flying Corps was merged with the Royal Naval Air Service to form the Royal Air Force. After scoring two victories in April and a double victory on 3 May, he was appointed a flight commander with the temporary rank of captain on 18 May. By the time he was awarded the Military Cross on 22 June 1918 he had 17 claims to his credit. Fifteen of these wins were shared with observer/gunner Lieutenant John Rutherford Gordon making Gordon an ace in his own right.

Staton eventually claimed a total of 26 victories, the last one on 24 September 1918. Eight of his last nine victories came with Lieutenant Leslie Mitchell as observer/gunner. In all, Staton had four observers fly with him, and all four became aces, though Merritt and Sergeant William Norman Holmes scored most of their victories with other pilots. His final victory roll comprised (in conjunction with his gunners) two enemy fighters shot down in flames, fourteen more enemy aircraft destroyed, a Pfalz D.XII captured, and an additional nine enemy aircraft driven down 'out of control'.

Staton received the Distinguished Flying Cross on 21 September 1918; a Bar in lieu of a second award would follow, after the armistice, on 3 December. Staton was wounded in the leg by an explosive bullet during combat east of Cambrai on 24 September 1918. Recovering from this wound, he sat out the rest of the war.

== Inter-war career ==
Staton remained in the RAF after the war, being granted a permanent commission as a lieutenant (flying officer) on 1 August 1919. On 12 January 1920, he was posted to No. 20 Squadron, flying the Bristol Fighter on army co-operation duties in the North-West Frontier province of India. On 30 April 1922 he was posted to the RAF Depot as a supernumerary because of illness, but by 16 September 1922 he had recovered enough to be posted to the Marine and Armament Experimental Establishment at RAF Isle of Grain. He was promoted to flight lieutenant on 1 January 1925. In May 1927 Staton was assigned to staff duty at RAF Calshot. That year his name was brought to the notice of the Air Council for his gallantry in saving an airman from drowning after a flying accident. Though nearly overcome by petrol fumes he repeatedly dived under water to extricate the airman. In March 1929 he became an instructor.

On 17 January 1931 Staton was posted to No. 205 Squadron based at RAF Seletar in Singapore, flying Supermarine Southampton flying boats. In February 1934 he was posted to the RAF Depot, and later, on 18 June, he was assigned as Adjutant and Qualified Flight Instructor to No. 501 (City of Bristol) Squadron, Auxiliary Air Force, based at RAF Filton, to fly the Westland Wallace.

Staton was promoted to squadron leader on 1 February 1935, and on the 15th, he was posted to the Headquarters, Inland Area, Stanmore. On 20 April 1936 he was posted to No. 3 Flying Training School, RAF Grantham, for administrative duties. On 30 May 1938 he was posted to fly Vickers Wellesley bombers with No. 76 Squadron, and on 10 June took command of No. 10 (Bomber) Squadron at RAF Dishforth. His size prompted the new nickname of "King Kong". On 1 July 1938 he was promoted to wing commander.

== Second World War ==
Britain declared war on Germany on 3 September 1939. Staton commanded the first British air raid on Berlin on the night of 1/2 October 1939, leading four of No. 10 Squadron's Whitleys to the enemy capital through severe weather to drop propaganda leaflets. On 20 February 1940, Staton was awarded one of the first three Distinguished Service Orders (DSO) granted to the RAF during the war. The DSO is customarily awarded for meritorious or distinguished service in combat. He is known to have flown on numerous raids during this time and been disappointed by the inaccuracy he observed. He attempted to rectify the situation by use of flares for target marking. He also suggested forming a unit dedicated to marking targets; though he would not see it, this suggestion would eventually lead to formation of the Pathfinder Force, later raised as No. 8 Group, Bomber Command. In the same edition of the London Gazette he also received a mention in despatches.

On the night of 19/20 March 1940 Staton led an attack on the seaplane base at Hörnum, on the island of Sylt, his being the first aircraft to drop bombs on German soil. This was in retaliation for a German air raid on the naval base at Scapa Flow on 16 March in which four sailors and one civilian were killed, and seven wounded. Previous to this both the British and Germans had refrained from bombing land targets. Staton led seven Whitleys from No. 10 Squadron, as part of a force of thirty Whitleys and twenty Hampdens from Bomber Command's No. 4 and No. 5 Groups. Only 29 Whitleys and 17 Hampdens reached the target; three having turned back with mechanical problems, and one failing to locate the target. The aircraft dropped forty 500 lb (230 kg), eighty-four 250 lb (110 kg), and 1,260 incendiary bombs from heights ranging from 1,000 feet (300 m) to 10,000 feet (3,000 m), but mostly from around 4,000 feet (1,200 m), over a period of six hours. One Whitley was lost to enemy flak, and two others slightly damaged. Despite claims of severe damage being inflicted, later photo-reconnaissance showed only minor damage to the base and its installations. On 7 June Staton received a bar to his Distinguished Service Order in recognition of his "outstanding gallantry and leadership in recent air operations", awarded primarily for his part on an attack on an oil depot in Bremen, which he attacked at low level, despite his aircraft having been hit by six shells and badly damaged.

In July 1940 he was appointed to command of RAF Leeming, Yorkshire. On 1 December 1940 he was promoted to temporary group captain, and in January 1941 appointed an Air Aide-de-Camp to the King. His next assignment was as Senior Air Staff Officer, Headquarters RAF Far East, in July 1941, being promoted in January 1942 to acting air commodore, and on 11 February was assigned as Senior Air Staff Officer, Westgroup, Java. On 10 March 1942, following the Battle of Java, he was taken prisoner. Staton would spend the remainder of the war as a prisoner of the Japanese, and would undergo torture for refusing to disclose information to them. To punish him for his holding out against questioning, Japanese interrogators removed his back teeth. Staton proved an uncooperative prisoner and was moved sixteen times, spending time in camps in Batavia, Singapore, Japan, Formosa, the Gobi Desert, Mukden, and Siam. On 8 October 1943, while a prisoner, his temporary rank of group captain was made war substantive. Staton was released from captivity in September 1945 after three and a half years as a POW. Later he submitted written evidence to prosecutors at the War Crimes Trial of three Japanese officers from camps in Formosa.

== Post-war career ==
In November 1945 Staton was appointed Air Officer Commanding, No. 46 (Transport) Group, and on 1 January 1946 was promoted to group captain with the concurrent temporary rank of air commodore. On 1 October 1946 he received his second mention in despatches "in recognition of gallant and distinguished service whilst a prisoner of war in Japanese hands", and in the 1947 New Year Honours was made a Companion of the Order of the Bath. Staton was promoted to air commodore on 1 July 1947, relinquishing his position as Air Aide-de-Camp to the King, and in November was appointed Commandant of the Central Bomber Establishment at RAF Marham. On 5 April 1949 he was appointed Air Officer in Charge of Administration, Headquarters, Technical Training Command, with a promotion to acting air vice marshal, made permanent on 1 July 1950. Staton finally retired from the RAF on 12 November 1952 at his own request, in order to facilitate the promotion of younger officers.

William Ernest Staton died on 22 July 1983, just before his 85th birthday.

== Awards and citations ==
=== Military Cross ===
Temporary Second Lieutenant William Ernest Staton, General List and Royal Flying Corps.

"For conspicuous gallantry and devotion to duty. On one occasion, when on offensive patrol, he, by the skilful handling of his machine and accurate shooting destroyed two enemy aeroplanes and brought down a third out of control. In addition, during the nine days previous to this, he had destroyed five other enemy machines, two of these being triplanes. The services which he has rendered have been exceptionally brilliant, and his skill and determination are deserving of the highest praise."
— London Gazette, 21 June 1918.

=== Distinguished Flying Cross ===
Lieutenant (Temporary Captain) William Ernest Staton, MC.

"This officer has already been awarded the Military Cross for gallantry and devotion to duty. Since this award he has accounted for eleven enemy aeroplanes—nine destroyed and two shot down out of control. He has proved himself a most efficient flight commander and an enterprising leader, setting a very fine example to his squadron."
— London Gazette, 20 September 1918.

=== Bar to Distinguished Flying Cross ===
Lieutenant (Acting Captain) William Ernest Staton, MC, DFC.

"This officer has already been awarded the Military Cross and the Distinguished Flying Cross for conspicuous gallantry and devotion to duty. Since his last award he has destroyed five enemy machines and driven down one out of control. His example of courage and resource is a fine incentive to the other pilots of his squadron."
— London Gazette, 29 November 1918.

=== Bar to Distinguished Service Order ===
Wing Commander William Ernest Staton, DSO, MC, DFC. (04225).

"This officer has continued to display outstanding gallantry and leadership in recent air operations. One night in May 1940, he led an attack on the oil depot at Bremen. The target was very heavily defended and difficult to identify owing to the exceptional number of searchlights but, after worrying and misleading the defences for an hour, he dived and attacked from 1,000 feet to ensure hitting the target. His aircraft was hit by six shells, the last one of which did considerable damage but he succeeded in reaching his home base. Wing Commander Staton organises and leads his squadron on all new tasks with constant courage and his work on his station is magnificent."
— London Gazette, 7 June 1940.

=== Other awards ===
In addition to the gallantry awards noted above Staton also received:

- British War Medal
- Victory Medal with oak leaf
- India General Service Medal with clasps "Mahsud 1919–20" and "Waziristan 1919–21"
- 1939-45 Star
- Air Crew Europe Star
- Pacific Star
- Defence Medal
- War Medal 1939–1945 with oak leaf
- Czechoslovak War Cross 1939–1945
- Coronation Medal 1953

== Personal life ==
Staton married Norah Carina Workman at Holy Trinity, Northwood, on 15 November 1919. They had two sons. She died in 1969, and he married Jean Patricia Primrose in 1973.

Staton's larger than life personality and physical presence gained him the nickname of "Bull" during the First World War, as well as a prominent scar on his head, the result of an over-boisterous mess party. While commander of No. 10 Squadron during the Second World War he was nicknamed "King Kong" by the pilots under his command, and was dubbed "Crack'Em Staton" by the Daily Express after the attack on Sylt.

A keen marksman, Staton regularly competed in both rifle and pistol shooting competitions representing the RAF in shooting matches eleven times, and eventually served as Chairman of the RAF Small Arms Association from 1947 until 1952, and was Captain of the British Olympic Pistol Shooting Team in London in 1948 and Helsinki in 1952. He remained a keen shooter even into retirement, winning the Air Officers SMG Match at Bisley in 1961.

Staton was also a skilled yachtsman, serving as Commodore of the Emsworth Sailing Club in Hampshire.

== Bibliography ==
- Guttman, Jon & Dempsey, Harry (2007). Bristol F2 Fighter Aces of World War I. Oxford, UK: Osprey Publishing. ISBN 978-1-84603-201-1.
- Shores, Christopher F.; Franks, Norman & Guest, Russell F. (1990). Above the Trenches: a Complete Record of the Fighter Aces and Units of the British Empire Air Forces 1915–1920. London, UK: Grub Street. ISBN 978-0-948817-19-9.
