= No. 62 Squadron RAF =

Defunct flying squadron of the Royal Air Force

- Active: 8 August 1916 – 31 July 1919; 3 May 1937 – 15 March 1946; 1 Sept 1946 – 10 August 1947; 8 Dec 1947 – 1 June 1949; 1 Feb 1960 – 31 January 1963
- Country: United Kingdom
- Branch: Royal Air Force
- Mottos: Latin: Insperato ("Unexpectedly")

Insignia
- Badge: A meteor
- Squadron Codes: 62 May 1937 – Nov 1938; JO Nov 1938 – Sep 1939; PT Sep 1939 – Feb 1942

No. 62 Squadron of the Royal Air Force was originally established as a Royal Flying Corps squadron in 1916 and operated the Bristol F2B fighter in France during the last year of the First World War. After the war the squadron was disbanded and it was re-established in 1937 as part of the buildup of the RAF in the late 1930s. During the Second World War the Squadron was deployed to the Far East, operating the Bristol Blenheim from Singapore and Malaya. In 1942 No. 62 Squadron was re-equipped with the Lockheed Hudson and it moved to Sumatra, then Burma and then India. After the close of World War II the squadron disbanded for the second time. It was briefly re-established from 1946 to 1947 as a Dakota squadron and operated out of Burma and India. It final incarnation was as a Bristol Bloodhound missile unit in the early 1960s.

== First World War ==
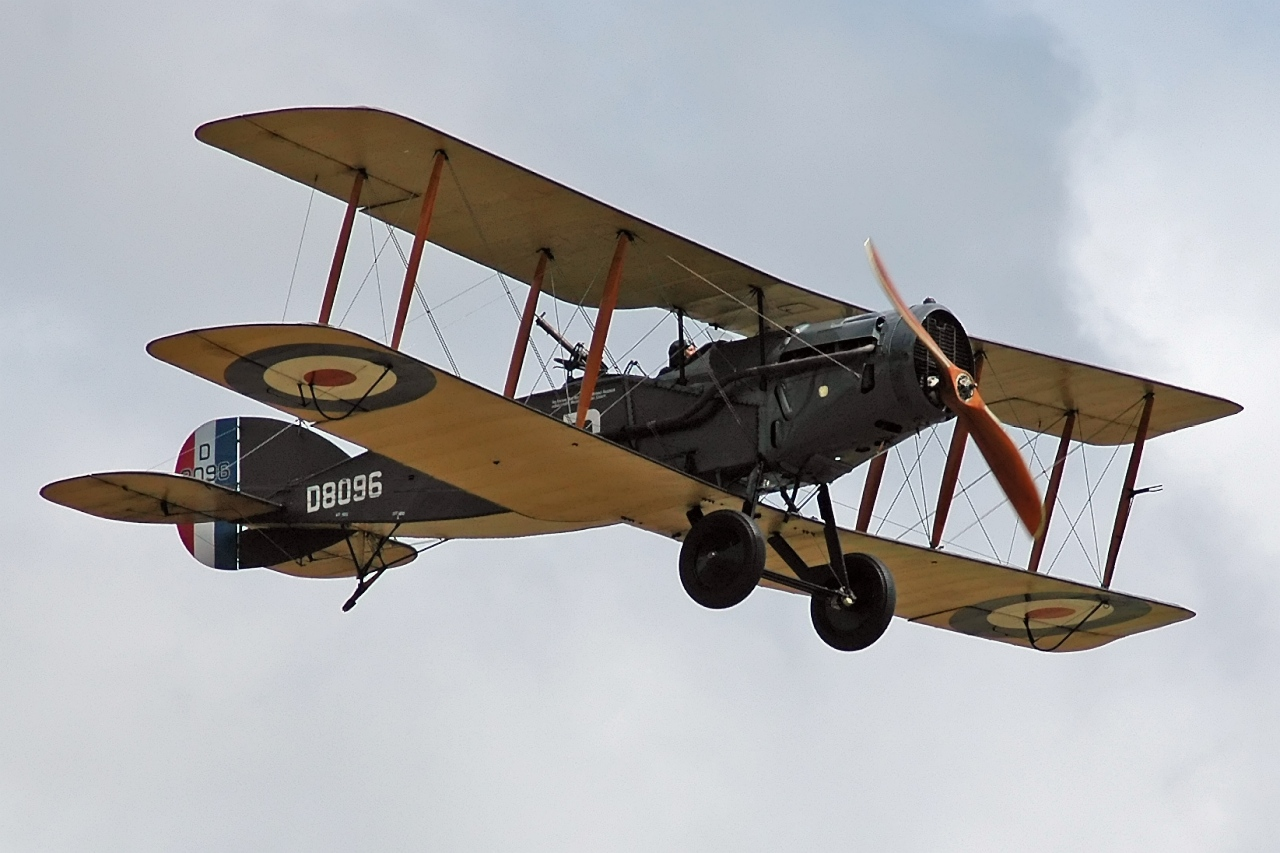
No. 62 Squadron was equipped with Bristol F.2b Fighters in 1917.

No. 62 Squadron of the Royal Flying Corps was established at Filton, Gloucestershire on 8 August 1916 from elements of No. 7 Training Squadron. The unit received Bristol F2B fighter aircraft in May 1917 and was deployed to France in January 1918 with operations commencing from the aerodrome at Serny in early 1918. The squadron operated as fighter-reconnaissance unit until disbanding on 31 July 1919.

The first victory for the squadron was credited on 21 February 1918 near Armentières, Nord, France. Nicknamed "The Cheery 62s," the unit had its first encounter with Manfred von Richthofen's Circus on 12 March 1918, resulting in at least two aviators killed, four captured, and one wounded. No. 62 Squadron was one of the last two Bristol F.2 Fighter squadrons to serve at the Western Front, the other being No. 88 Squadron. The aircraft of both squadrons often escorted de Havilland planes on bombing missions. By the end of the war, No. 62 Squadron was credited with 76 enemy aircraft destroyed and 85 driven out of control. Ten aces served in the unit, including future Air Vice-Marshal William Ernest Staton as well as George Everard Gibbons, Thomas L. Purdom, Geoffrey Forrest Hughes, Thomas Elliott, Charles Arnison, Ernest Morrow, William Norman Holmes, Hugh Claye and Douglas Savage. The Squadron's victories came at a high price as 28 of its aviators were killed in action and three killed in accidents. In addition, 32 aviators became prisoners of war, 22 were wounded in action, and eleven sustained accidental injuries. This does not compare favorably with No. 88 Squadron, the last Bristol Fighter unit to reach the front. While that squadron was credited with 147 enemy aircraft destroyed, it only had two aviators killed, five wounded, and ten reported missing.

== Revived for the Second World War ==
On 3 May 1937, the squadron was reformed at Abingdon from 'B' Flight of No. 40 Squadron, equipped with Hawker Hinds. In February 1938 the squadron re-equipped with Bristol Blenheims. The squadron was posted to Singapore in August 1939 and moved to Alor Star in northern Malaya in February 1940. Japan invaded Malaya on 8 December 1941 and the squadron was evacuated to Butterworth on 9 December. Later that day, an attack on Singora airfield was planned, but Butterworth was attacked by Japanese aircraft when the British force was preparing to take off, with only one Blenheim, piloted by Squadron Leader Arthur Scarf of 62 Squadron getting away, carrying out a single-handed attack on Singora. His Blenheim was heavily damaged by Japanese fighters and anti-aircraft fire, badly injuring Scarf. Despite his injuries, he managed to make a forced landing at Alor Star, saving the rest of his crew. He died in hospital that evening. Scarf was eventually posthumously awarded the Victoria Cross for his actions that day. Butterworth was heavily damaged by the Japanese attack on 9 December, and the squadron moved again, this time to Taiping, Perak. It withdrew again on 19 December, this time to Singapore. Losses, mainly from Japanese attacks on its airfields were heavy, and the squadron re-equipped with Lockheed Hudsons and moved to P2 airfield near Palembang, Sumatra in January 1942. Six 62 Squadron Hudsons took part in attacks against Japanese troopships landing at Endau, Malaya on 26 January, two being shot down by Japanese Ki-27 fighters. The squadron was evacuated from P2 to Java when Japanese paratroops landed at Palembang. The squadron operated closely with those of No. 1 Squadron RAAF, before being disbanded on 20 January 1942, its remaining Hudsons being transferred to 1 Squadron RAAF.

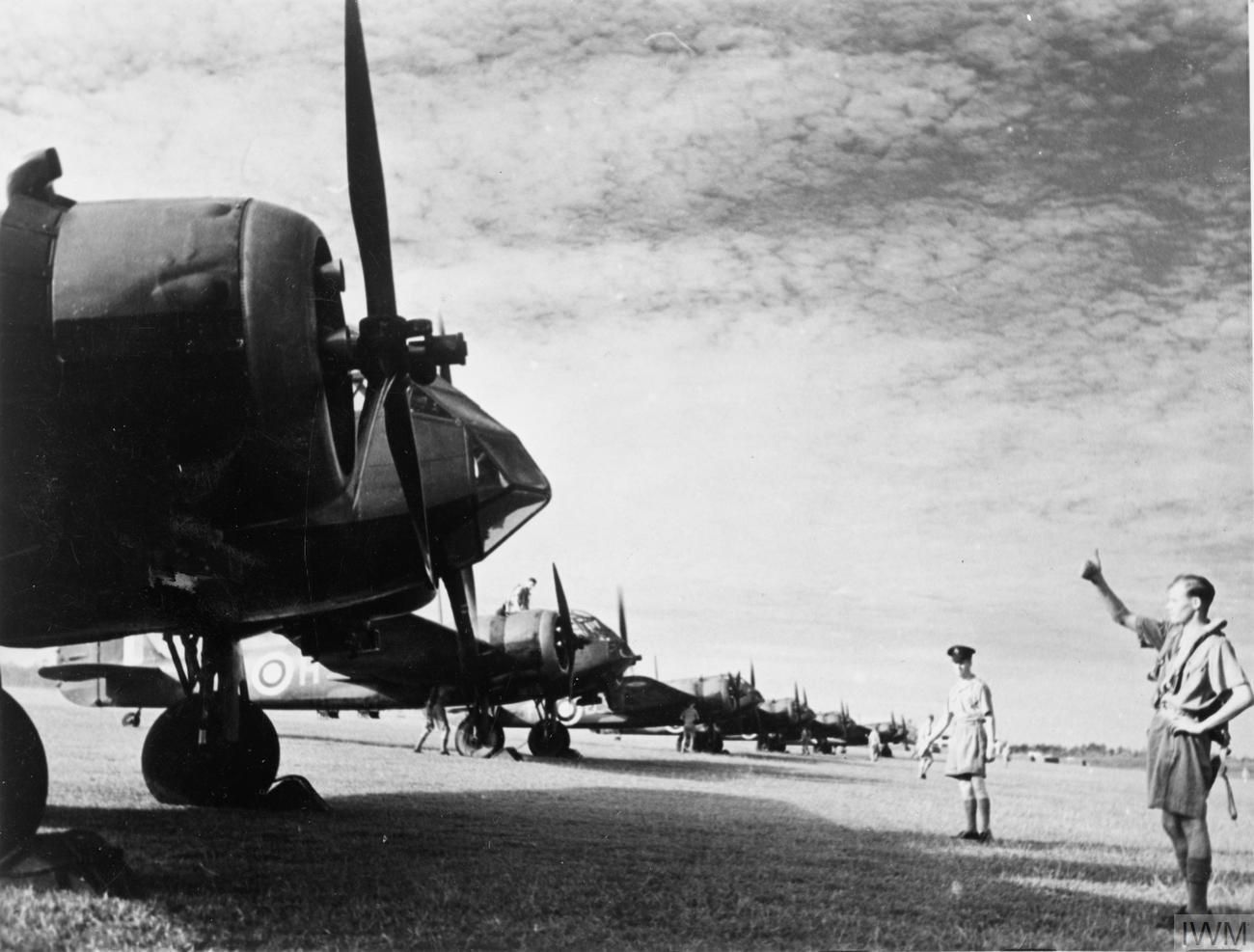
Bristol Blenheims of No. 62 Squadron at Singapore, February 1941

On 30 April 1942, the squadron reformed when No. 139 Squadron, equipped with Hudsons and based at Calcutta was renumbered. The squadron was a General Reconnaissance unit, flying coastal reconnaissance and anti-submarine patrols off the coast of Burma. On 18 August, one of the squadron's Hudsons drove off a Japanese flying boat attacking the merchant ship SS Itinda.

From January 1943, the squadron concentrated on bombing missions rather than the maritime mission which it had previously. In May that year, it withdrew from front line operations as its Hudsons were modified for the transport role, while in November, before becoming operational, it re-equipped with Douglas Dakotas. The squadron flew in support of British and Commonwealth forces during the Battle of the Admin Box in February 1944 and of Operation Thursday, the second Chindit operation in March. It was heavily deployed in dropping supplies during the Battle of Imphal, continuing to fly through the heavy rains of the Monsoon season. The squadron was withdrawn for operations for rest in August 1944, returning to supply dropping in November, continuing these duties and more general transport flying until the end of the war in August 1945. The squadron disbanded on 15 March 1946 at Mingaladon, near Rangoon (now Yangon), Burma.

== Post Second World War ==
It reformed again, as a Dakota squadron, at Mingaladon on 1 September 1946, when No. 76 Squadron was re-numbered No. 62. The squadron moved to India and disbanded on 10 August 1947. The squadron reformed at RAF Manston on 8 December 1947 to assist in the Berlin Airlift, and remained operational after the Berlin Airlift, until disbanding at RAF Oakington on 1 June 1949.

From 1 February 1960 to 31 January 1963, the squadron was based at Woolfox Lodge as a Bristol Bloodhound equipped missile unit, part of No. 151 Wing RAF.

== Aircraft operated ==
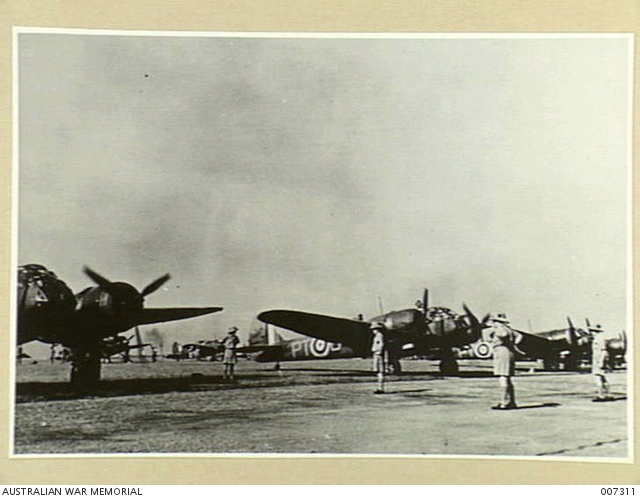
Bristol Blenheim I bombers from 62 Squadron in Malaya, 1941.

- 1917–1919 Bristol F2B Fighter
- 1937–1938 Hawker Hind
- 1938–1942 Bristol Blenheim I
- 1942–1943 Lockheed Hudson III
- 1943 Lockheed Hudson VI
- 1943–1946 Douglas Dakota
- 1946–1947 Douglas Dakota
- 1947–1949 Douglas Dakota
- 1960–1964 Bristol Bloodhound I
