= Great Witchingham =

Village in Norfolk, England

Coordinates: 52.7307°N 1.1092°E

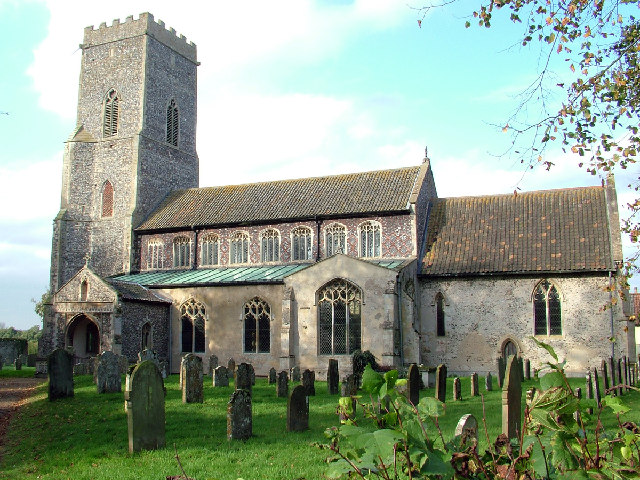
- St Mary's Church

- Location within Norfolk
- Area: 0.76 sq mi (2.0 km^{2})
- Population: 542 (2021 census)
  - Density: 713/sq mi (275/km^{2})
- OS grid reference: TG100193
- Civil parish: Great Witchingham
- District: Broadland
- Shire county: Norfolk
- Region: East
- Country: England
- Sovereign state: United Kingdom
- Post town: NORWICH
- Postcode district: NR9
- Dialling code: 01603
- Police: Norfolk
- Fire: Norfolk
- Ambulance: East of England
- UK Parliament: Broadland and Fakenham

Great Witchingham is a village and civil parish in the English county of Norfolk, along the River Wensum. The civil parish also includes the smaller village of Lenwade.

Great Witchingham is located 8.1 miles (13.0 km) north-east of Dereham and 11 miles (18 km) north-west of Norwich.

== History ==
Great Witchingham's name is of Anglo-Saxon origin and derives from the Old English for the larger homestead of Wic's people.

In the Domesday Book, Great & Little Witchingham are listed together as a settlement of 92 households hundred of Eynesford. In 1086, the village was part of the East Anglian estates of King William I, Count Eustace of Boulogne, St Benet's Abbey, William d'Ecouis, Reginald, son of Ivo and Walter Giffard.

During the reign of King Henry I, a Cluniac monastic cell was founded in the village which had been destroyed by the Fifteenth Century. The site was excavated in 1935.

Witchingham Old Hall was founded in the Sixteenth Century or Seventeenth Century and was eventually demolished in the Nineteenth Century.

In October 1944, a V-2 rocket landed in the parish causing a large crater which was subsequently turned into a pond.

== Geography ==
According to the 2021 census, Great Witchingham has a population of 542 people which shows an increase from the 496 people recorded in the 2011 census.

The River Wensum and the A1067, between Fakenham and Norwich, both run through the parish.

== St. Mary's Church ==
Great Witchingham's parish church is dedicated to Saint Mary and dates from the Fourteenth Century. St. Mary's is located outside of the village on Heath Lane and has been Grade I listed since 1961. The church is still open for Sunday services about twice a month.

St. Mary holds a Fifteenth Century font with some of its original paint remaining as well as a lecturn topped with an eagle which was brought to the church from New College, Oxford in the Nineteenth Century.

== Great Witchingham Hall ==
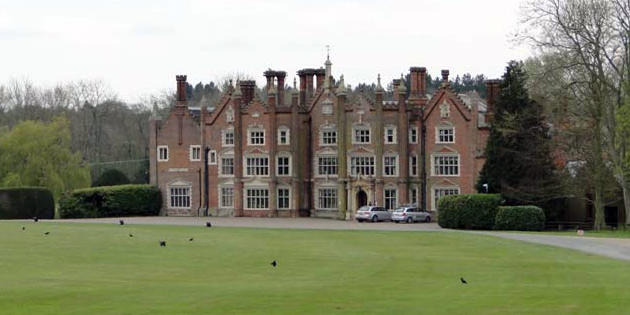
Great Witchingham Hall

Great Witchingham Hall is a Grade II* listed country house built in the 16th or 17th century but extensively remodelled in the 19th century. It is built in two and three storeys of red brick with stone and plastered brick dressings and a steeply pitched slate roof. The Hall was owned and occupied by country squire Oliver Le Neve between 1678 and 1711. Le Neve is significant for his 1698 mortal duel with Sir Henry Hobart of Blickling Hall, the last duel fought in Norfolk. The south wing was added in 1812 by Timothy Tompson and the north frontage redesigned in 1872 for Charles Kett Tompson, High Sheriff of Norfolk for 1827. After the latter's death it passed to his son-in-law, Viscount Canterbury. It later became the seat of William James Barry J.P. (1864–1952), High Sheriff of Norfolk for 1912, and his son Lieutenant-Colonel Gerald Barry (1896–1977). The dilapidated post-Second World War property was bought in 1950 by Bernard Matthews, and after being initially used for turkey rearing and processing, became the head office of his turkey business, Bernard Matthews Farms.

The GWR 6959 Modified Hall Class No.6966 was named Witchingham Hall. Out shopped from Swindon Works on 31 May 1944 as part of Lot No.350, it was initially allocated to 82D Westbury, and finally to 81F Oxford. Withdrawn on 30 September 1964, it was sold by British Railways to Birds scrap metal merchants of Risca, Newport, South Wales and disposed of on 28 February 1965.

== Amenities ==
Great Witchingham Cricket Club play home games at Walcis Park and operate three senior XIs, several women's teams and a youth setup. The First XI play in the East Anglian Premier Cricket League.

== Governance ==
Great Witchingham is an electoral ward for local elections and is part of the district of Broadland.

The village's national constituency is Broadland and Fakenham which has been represented by the Conservative Party's Jerome Mayhew MP since 2019.

== Notable people ==
John Wilson, British angler

== War Memorial ==
Great Witchingham War Memorial was rebuilt in 2014 and is a brick memorial with sandstone plaques, it was opened by Jonathan Meyrick, Bishop of King's Lynn. The memorial lists the following names for the First World War:

Rank	Name	Unit	Date of death	Burial/Commemoration
Cpl.	Frederick J. Nelson	9th Bn., Essex Regiment	22 Aug. 1918	Méaulte Cemetery
Cpl.	Reginald L. Watkins	1st T.M. Bty., Royal Field Artillery	29 Aug. 1917	Ramscappelle Cemetery
Gnr.	William R. B. Brown	214th Bty., Royal Garrison Artillery	5 Sep. 1917	Vlamertinge Cemetery
Pte.	Leonard Nelson	1st Bn., East Yorkshire Regiment	17 Apr. 1917	Hollybrook Memorial
Pte.	James H. Starling	13th Bn., Essex Regiment	28 Apr. 1917	Arras Memorial
Pte.	Arthur King	23rd Bn., Royal Fusiliers	13 Nov. 1916	Thiepval Memorial
Pte.	Leonard J. Gray	2nd Bn., Hampshire Regiment	29 Jun. 1915	Helles Memorial
Pte.	Charles R. Moy	6th Bn., King's Own Yorkshire L.I.	7 Sep. 1915	Ypres Reservoir Cemetery
Pte.	Frank Smith	2nd Bn., Lincolnshire Regiment	13 Nov. 1916	Heilly Station Cemetery
Pte.	John Starling MM	1st Bn., Norfolk Regiment	4 Sep. 1916	Delville Wood Cemetery
Pte.	Stanley J. Bowes	4th Bn., Norfolk Regt.	19 Apr. 1917	Jerusalem Memorial
Pte.	James White	5th Bn., Norfolk Regt.	19 Apr. 1917	Gaza War Cemetery
Pte.	Horace W. Massingham	9th Bn., Norfolk Regt.	26 Sep. 1915	Loos Memorial
Pte.	Edgar H. Waters	5th Bn., Northumberland Fusilers	26 Oct. 1917	Tyne Cot
Pte.	Herbert T. Williamson	11th Bn., Suffolk Regiment	25 Oct. 1918	Delsaux Farm Cemetery
Rfn.	Albert Watkins	2nd Bn., King's Royal Rifle Corps	6 Jul. 1917	Ramscappelle Cemetery
Spr.	Arthur Arthurton	104th Coy., Royal Engineers	16 Jul. 1917	Lijssenthoek Cemetery
Stew.	William G. Hutchins	HMS Ariadne	26 Jul. 1917	Plymouth Naval Memorial

The following names were added after the Second World War:

Rank	Name	Unit	Date of death	Burial/Commemoration
Sgt.	Edwin H. Wright	No. 40 (Bomber) Squadron RAF	31 Dec. 1942	Malta Memorial
Sgt.	George E. Milk	560 Coy., Royal Engineers	12 Sep. 1944	Kranji War Memorial
LSgt.	Thomas H. Sutton	18 (B.D.) Coy., R.E.	14 Sep. 1941	Khayat Beach Cemetery
Gnr.	Cyril B. A. Walter	118 Regt., Royal Artillery	21 Sep. 1944	Kranji War Memorial
OSig.	Jack A. W. Bransby	HMS Anking	4 Mar. 1942	Chatham Naval Memorial

The following name was added after the Conflict in Afghanistan:

Rank	Name	Unit	Date of death	Burial/Commemoration
Pte.	Robert G. Foster (Note: Private Foster was killed in a friendly-fire incident in Helmand Province by two American F-15 fighter jets.)	1st Bn., Royal Anglian Regiment	23 Aug. 2007	Cremated
