= 2007 Bernard Matthews H5N1 outbreak =

Avian influenza outbreak in United Kingdom in 2007

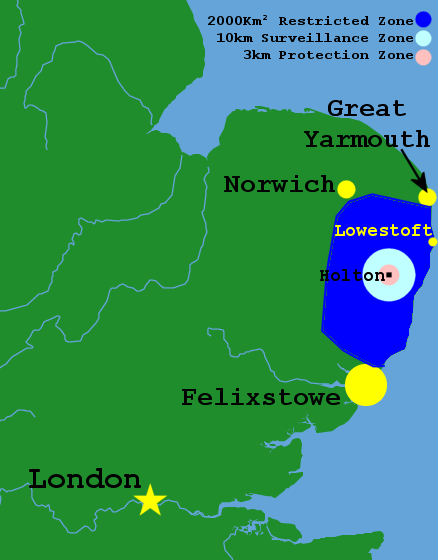
Map of the zones during the outbreak.

The 2007 Bernard Matthews H5N1 outbreak was an occurrence of avian influenza in England caused by the H5N1 subtype of Influenza virus A that began on 30 January 2007. The infection affected poultry at one of Bernard Matthews' farms in Holton in Suffolk. It was the third instance of H5N1-subtype detected in the United Kingdom and a range of precautions were instituted to prevent spread of the disease including a large cull of turkeys, the imposition of segregation zones, and a disinfection programme for the plant.

The cause of the outbreak was not determined. However, it was considered significant that Bernard Matthews regularly transports turkeys and turkey products between the UK and its plant in Hungary, and that the H5N1 strains previously found in Hungary, and those found at Suffolk, were effectively genetically identical.

== Background ==
=== H5N1 ===
H5N1 is a subtype of the Influenza A virus, the viruses responsible for influenza in humans and many other animal species. A bird-adapted strain of H5N1, called HPAI A(H5N1) for "highly pathogenic avian influenza virus of type A of subtype H5N1", is the causative agent of H5N1 flu.

HPAI A(H5N1) is considered an avian disease, although there is some evidence of limited human-to-human transmission of the virus. A risk factor for contracting the virus is handling of infected poultry, but transmission of the virus from infected birds to humans is inefficient. Poultry farming practices have changed due to H5N1. The cost of poultry farming has increased, while the cost to consumers has gone down, due to fears from H5N1 driving demand below supply.

=== Recent outbreaks in the UK and rest of EU ===
The outbreak was the third instance of H5N1 detected in the United Kingdom. The first outbreak occurred in October 2005 among exotic birds imported from Taiwan and South America at a privately owned quarantine facility in Essex, England. The second instance involved a dead whooper swan found to have the virus in Cellardyke, Scotland in April 2006. A corresponding incidence on a farm in south-eastern Hungary was confirmed by the European Commission on 25 January 2007.

== The outbreak ==
Initial signs of the outbreak occurred on Tuesday, 30 January when 55 turkey poults died and 16 had to be killed because they were sick. At least 185 more died the following day.

It was not until 1 February that the deaths were reported to Defra. The farm was sealed off while tests were carried out, on samples taken from the dead birds, at the Veterinary Laboratories Agency in Weybridge, Surrey. Another 1,500 birds died on 2 February. Then on 3 February 2007 the H5N1 causation was confirmed.

A 3 km protection zone, 10 km surveillance zone and a restricted zone encompassing 2000 km^{2} were set up. Another 159,000 turkeys were slaughtered with the cull being completed on the evening of 5 February. Also on 5 February there was criticism that nearby farmers had not been advised as to the action to be taken. Around 320 workers at the plant were given anti-viral drugs. Although a vet from the site was admitted into hospital, suffering from a 'mild respiratory illness' during the evening of 6 February, it was found not to be bird flu. The plant was thoroughly disinfected, with cleaning complete on 12 February, and permission being given for production to resume.

It emerged in a highly critical report from Defra that there was a series of biosecurity failings at the Holton plant, some of which were drawn to the company's attention in the past. These included "gulls were taking turkey waste to roosts on top of the turkey-house 500 m away" and "holes in the turkey houses could have allowed in birds or rodents". Defra minister Jeff Rooker stated in a House of Lords debate on 22 February that the outbreak was "exclusively a Bernard Matthews Holton problem".

== Hungarian connection ==
The Government, on 8 February, admitted that the outbreak may have been caused by semi-processed turkey meat imported directly from Hungary, where the disease is prevalent, despite earlier in the week the Environment Secretary, David Miliband assuring the House of Commons that there was "no Hungarian connection".

Bernard Matthews had been importing 38 tons of partly processed turkey meat on a weekly basis from their Saga Foods company, in Sárvár, Hungary, to a processing plant next to the farm. Though Saga Foods lies 165 miles (266 km) from where the recent Hungarian H5N1 outbreak had occurred, a company director admitted it was "possible" that some of the meat could have come from the exclusion zone. In response to this revelation, Whitehall expressed concern over biosecurity and whether any meat may have been distributed for human consumption in Britain. On 9 February 2007 the Hungarian authorities started an investigation to try to establish whether there was a connection between the Suffolk and Hungarian outbreaks. On 11 February the investigation revealed that turkey products were still being transported, in both directions, between the plant and Hungary with EU regulations being cited as the reason why a transport ban could not be imposed.

The Hungary link was dismissed by the European Commission on 12 February. Even so, the H5N1 bird flu strains found in Hungary and Britain were shown to be 99.96% genetically identical and, according to an analysis of the viruses by the Veterinary Laboratories Agency in Weybridge, Surrey, were almost certainly linked. A leak from the Government's COBRA emergency committee indicated that the authorities were not aware of the Hungarian connection until an investigator found a Gallfoods delivery wrapper in a Bernard Matthews bin. This raised the possibility that the outbreak was due to a "third party abattoir, Gallfoods in Hungary, just outside the restricted zone". This abattoir might have been a middle man for contaminated poultry farming tools, feed, or product from within the restricted zone, such as a Bernard Matthews owned subsidiary in Hungary.

In response to the incident and allegations of a cover-up, Bernard Matthews himself stated on 14 February "I'm sorry – but this has not been of our making. There's been absolutely no cover-up at our end. I've been upset about allegations that we may have withheld information. That is completely untrue."

Bernard Matthews was given permission to resume its shipments of poultry between the UK and Hungary from 17 February even though Defra indicated that Hungarian turkey products remained the "most plausible" cause of the outbreak.

== Consequences ==
By 8 February there was a lengthening list of countries that had banned the importation of poultry products from Britain including South Africa, Russia, Japan, and many others but a spokesman for the European Commission condemned the bans as "totally disproportionate" and the British Poultry Council pointed out that exports were less than 9% of the level of domestic sales. Supermarket sales of Bernard Matthews branded turkeys halved after the onset of the outbreak as shoppers sought out alternatives. One of the biggest ongoing surveys of consumer confidence revealed that, by 13 February 2007, Bernard Matthews was the least respected and trusted brand in Britain.

Following the outbreak the company confirmed, on 19/02/2007, that 130 workers would be laid off for a period of twenty days due to a drop in product sales. The Transport and General Workers' Union then called for the government to provide compensation to the workers affected. The Transport and General Workers' Union paid out hardship monies from union funds to union members, on top of any state benefits to which the laid-off workers were entitled and a one-off £100 payment from Bernard Matthews.

A row broke out on 01/03/2007 when it emerged that the government was paying compensation to the company for the 159 000 culled turkeys while laid-off workers were receiving nothing. At £3.75 each for hens and £3.53 for toms, the payout was then estimated at between £537 000 and £570 000. In the event, though, the actual compensation bill came out at £589,356.89. The crisis cost Bernard Matthews at least £20 m in lost sales and costs.

== See also ==
- Redgrave 2007 outbreak
