= Harold Mellings =

British World War I flying ace

Harold Thomas Mellings
- Born: 5 August 1899; Bromfield, Shropshire, England
- Died: 22 July 1918; Ostend, Belgium
- Burial place: Ramscappelle Road Military Cemetery, Nieuwpoort, Belgium
- Military career
- Allegiance: United Kingdom
- Branch: Royal Navy; Royal Air Force
- Service years: 1915–1918
- Rank: Captain
- Units: No. 2 Wing RNAS; No. 10 Squadron RNAS/No. 210 Squadron RAF
- Conflicts: World War I • Macedonian front • Western Front
- Awards: Distinguished Service Cross & bar Distinguished Flying Cross

Captain Harold Thomas Mellings DSC*, DFC was a British World War I flying ace credited with 15 aerial victories.

== Early life and career ==
Mellings was granted Royal Aero Club Aviators' Certificate No. 2028 at the Beatty Flying School in Hendon on a Caudron biplane on 11 November 1915, having joined the Royal Naval Air Service as a temporary probationary flight sub-lieutenant, and was confirmed in his rank on 3 April 1916.

== Service on the Aegean Front ==
Mellings began his career as a fighter ace on 30 September 1916, when he flew a Bristol Scout to victory over an LVG near Smyrna. He sent the observation plane spinning down out of control. It would be exactly a year until victory number two, by which time he had been promoted to flight lieutenant (June 1917). This second action was a clash between polyglot forces. Mellings was flying a recently rebuilt Sopwith Triplane equipped with an extra gun, and was accompanied by John Alcock in a Sopwith Camel and a third pilot in a Sopwith Pup. The opposing Germans were a two-seater observation plane escorted by two Albatros W.4s. The ensuing dogfight resulted in Mellings shooting away the upper left wing of Walter Kreuger's W.4; Kreuger crashed into the Aegean Sea. In November, Mellings destroyed enemy aircraft on the 19th, 25th, and 29th, becoming an ace while still flying Sopwith Triplane No. N5431. Soon afterwards, he was transferred out of No. 2 Wing to No. 10 Naval Squadron on the Western Front in France.

== Service on the Western Front ==
Mellings's new assignment put him in the cockpit of a Sopwith Camel. He used it to score his sixth triumph on 28 February 1918. He tallied four more wins in March, including a double victory on 24 March, to become a double ace. After one more win, on 9 April, he was wounded in action on the 15th. He would not score again until 9 July 1918. He then notched two victories each on 20 and 22 July. Mellings's final tally was ten enemy aeroplanes confirmed destroyed, five driven down out of control, and two unconfirmed victories.

== Death and burial place ==
Later in the day of the 22nd, he was killed in action by Ludwig Beckmann.

He is buried in Ramscappelle Road Military Cemetery, Nieuwpoort, Belgium.

== Honours and awards ==
Distinguished Service Cross
Flight Sub-Lieutenant Harold Thomas Mellings, RNAS.

"In recognition of his services on 19 March 1917, when he attacked a hostile aeroplane with great gallantry at heights varying from 12,000 to 2,000 feet."

Bar to the Distinguished Service Cross
Flight Lieutenant Harold Thomas Mellings, DSC, RNAS.

"For the great skill, judgment and dash displayed by him off Mudros on 30 September 1917, in a successful attack on three enemy seaplanes, two of which were brought down in the sea."

Distinguished Flying Cross
Lieutenant (Honorary Captain) Harold Thomas Mellings, DSC. (Sea Patrol).

"A very gallant officer who, on a recent patrol, attacked and caused to crash an enemy two-seater. Later, on the same patrol, he was attacked by four Fokkers, one of which he shot down at a range of ten yards; this machine was seen to crash. A second was driven down smoking. Since he was awarded a Bar to the Distinguished Service Cross Captain Mellings has, in addition to the above, accounted for eleven enemy machines—seven destroyed, and four driven down out of control."

Mellings was also awarded the Silver War Medal by Greece on 21 September 1916.
