= Bernard Matthews Foods =

Farming and food products business in Norfolk, England

Bernard Matthews Foods Limited
- Company type: Private limited company
- Industry: Farming; Food products
- Founded: 1950
- Founder: Bernard Matthews
- Headquarters: Great Witchingham, Norfolk, England (1955–2024)
- Key people: Robert Burnett (Chief Executive Officer)
- Products: Turkey products
- Revenue: £341.4 million (12 months ended 1 July 2012)
- Operating income: £5.3 million (12 months ended 1 July 2012)
- Net income: £2.0 million (12 months ended 1 July 2012)
- Owner: Ranjit Singh Boparan
- Number of employees: 2,575
- Website: www.bernardmatthews.com

Bernard Matthews Foods Limited is a British farming and food products business which specialises in turkey products.

Founded by Bernard Matthews in 1950, it has 56 farms throughout Norfolk, Suffolk and Lincolnshire farming nearly 7 million turkeys each year. It also has poultry production operations in Derby and Sunderland. The company breeds and rears both indoor and free range turkeys on its farms, and is an integrated agricultural business.

== History ==
The company was founded in 1950 by Bernard Matthews from his home with his wife, twenty turkey eggs and an incubator.

In 1955, its headquarters were moved to Great Witchingham Hall near Norwich. Bernard Matthews entered the Guinness Book of Records in 1960 as the biggest turkey farmer in Europe. In 1971, the company was publicly listed.

In 1980, they launched their first TV commercial featuring Turkey Breast Roast, with Matthews himself introducing the famous 'Bootiful' catchphrase in his thick Norfolk accent. Bernard Matthews successfully fought off a take-over bid from US food giant Sara Lee in 2000. The following year, the company was bought back by the Matthews family and made private again.

Contract workers were convicted of animal cruelty in 2006 for playing 'baseball' with live turkeys. There were further troubles in 2007, when the company's farm in Holton suffered an outbreak of the H5N1 strain of avian influenza. The same year, the company's factory B plant closed, with staff moved to A plant, causing many to leave or be relocated at its parent plant up the road.

By July 2008, the company had re-branded itself from Bernard Matthews Foods to Bernard Matthews Farms, and stated that all its turkey products would be made with British turkey from its own farms. The company also unveiled a plan to reposition the company comprising three key elements: refocusing on British Turkey farming and production, making products that claim to better meet the needs of consumers today, and championing British agriculture.

In January 2010, Bernard Matthews resigned from the post of chairman, coinciding with his 80th birthday. In April that year, the company began a new advertising campaign, bringing back its 'Bootiful' catchphrase that had previously been used between 1980 and 2007. On 25 November 2010, founder Bernard Matthews died.

The business was bought out by turnaround experts, Rutland Partners in September 2013. In September 2016, the company was sold to an investment company owned by Ranjit Singh Boparan for £87.5 million.

In 2024, Bernard Matthews closed its headquarters in Great Witchingham after 69 years.

== Operations ==
Bernard Matthews has four main operating sites within the UK: Great Witchingham (Norfolk), Holton (Suffolk), Derby (Derbyshire) and Sunderland (Tyne & Wear).

Bernard Matthews Limited is based in the East of England and produces a range of fresh, cooked and frozen turkey products which it sells across the UK. It employs around 2,200 staff and farms around 7 million turkeys per annum. It has 56 turkey farms and two production sites located in Norfolk and Suffolk. Bernard Matthews Limited is Assured Food Standards (Red Tractor) accredited and its production sites have ISO 14001 accreditation.

The Derby and Sunderland sites joined Bernard Matthews in October 2021.

In 2024, Bernard Matthews announced the closure of its site at Great Witchingham.

Past Operations

Bernard Matthews Oldenburg is based in the north of Germany. It produces a range of fresh, cooked and frozen poultry products which it sells across Germany and northern Europe. The operation was sold to Sprehe group in July 2016 for £11.9 million and still operates under the Bernard Matthews brand.

SáGa Foods is based in northwest Hungary and employs around 800 staff. It produces a range of poultry products which it sells across Central Europe. It was part of the Bernard Matthews group from 2003 until January 2020 when the business was sold to Mastergood, a Hungarian poultry producer.

== Products ==
The company produces a range of cooked, fresh and frozen British turkey, including products such as oven-ready whole birds, joints, cooked re-formed meats, and meal accompaniments, which accounts for over 90% of the business. Bernard Matthews also produces chicken products which are made with meat sourced from partners in South America. Fish was another product in the 1990s and 2000s, branded as Golden Fishies, before being discontinued.

Bernard Matthews Farms produces turkey for leading UK grocery supermarket chains for use under their own retail brands, and also for businesses supplying the out-of-home foodservice market.

Under the "Golden Norfolk Turkey" brand, Bernard Matthews Farms provides a frozen turkey range including whole birds in a variety of sizes, plus crowns and joints, basted and stuffed. New products under the Farms brand introduced in 2009 included several new seasonings, and an apricot and date stuffing.

=== Turkey Twizzlers ===
One of Bernard Matthews' formed-meat products, Turkey Twizzlers, containing 34% turkey, became synonymous with cheap food for children. They became a subject of debate in 2005, when they were singled out for particular criticism by celebrity chef Jamie Oliver in his television series Jamie's School Dinners. The product became an emblem of the mass-produced processed food that Oliver wanted to remove from school meals. In the wake of the programme, several major catering organisations announced that they would no longer serve Turkey Twizzlers in schools. Bernard Matthews discontinued the product in 2005 to avoid any further criticism and negative press coverage, although the publicity had increased consumption.

In 2020, Bernard Matthews relaunched the Turkey Twizzler brand, with a higher meat content.

== Animal welfare ==
On 7 September 2006, two contract workers were convicted of animal cruelty after being covertly filmed by a member of staff from Hillside Animal Sanctuary, playing 'baseball' with live turkeys. The two men were sentenced to a 200-hour community service which was later criticised as being 'derisory' by some animal welfare organisations. Their defence lawyer stated that their actions were part of a "culture" at the Norfolk plant and, describing the conditions in the unit as "appalling", said: "You can see why people move to an organic, more open type of farming." A vet who saw the tape described the abuse as "the most hideous and blatant actions he had seen." In response, the company took out a newspaper advertisement condemning the animal cruelty, stating that the men concerned were sub-contractors, and that none of its employees abused livestock. A spokesman stated that they were committed to the "highest standards" of animal welfare.

== Avian flu outbreak ==
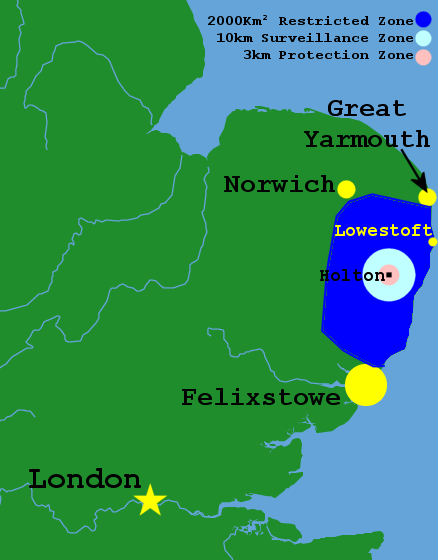
Map of the zones during the outbreak

The 2007 Bernard Matthews H5N1 outbreak was an occurrence of avian flu in England that began on 30 January 2007. The infection was caused by the H5N1 subtype of the Influenza A virus and occurred at one of Bernard Matthews' farms in Holton, Suffolk. A range of precautions were instituted including a large cull of turkeys, the imposition of segregation zones, and a disinfection programme for the plant.

It emerged in a highly critical report from Defra that there was a series of biosecurity failings at the Holton plant, some of which had been drawn to the company's attention in the past.

Though the cause of the outbreak has not been determined, Bernard Matthews regularly transported turkeys and turkey products between the UK and its plant in Hungary, and the H5N1 bird flu strains found in Hungary and Britain were effectively genetically identical.

Consequences of the outbreak included bans by a number of countries on the importation of poultry from Britain, a sharp fall in sales of Bernard Matthews products resulting in workers being laid off and a collapse in confidence in the brand.

== Food Safety ==
A Channel 4 Dispatches investigation broadcast in December 2023 sending two undercover reporters into a Bernard Matthews factory in Suffolk.

Employees were recorded falsifying safety records and instructing the recruited reporters to do the same. Inspected frozen food that was -2 degrees Celsius was recorded as -18.

An employee was recorded kicking a piece of turkey that had fallen from the production line and then picking it up and discarding it before touching an active conveyor belt carrying food with the same gloves.

Both the undercover reporters found that food was contaminated with plastic and machinery to detect metal in products was defective, but neither was investigated when brought to the attention of superiors.
