= True's Yard Fisherfolk Museum =

Social history museum in King's Lynn, Norfolk

Coordinates: 52.7582°N 0.3968°E

True’s Yard Fisherfolk Museum is a social history museum in King's Lynn, Norfolk. It is an independent museum run almost entirely by volunteers and depicts the story of the old North End fishing quarter of King's Lynn. Support was received from the late Bernard Matthews and others. Most of the North End was knocked down in the slum clearances of the 1930s and 1960s.

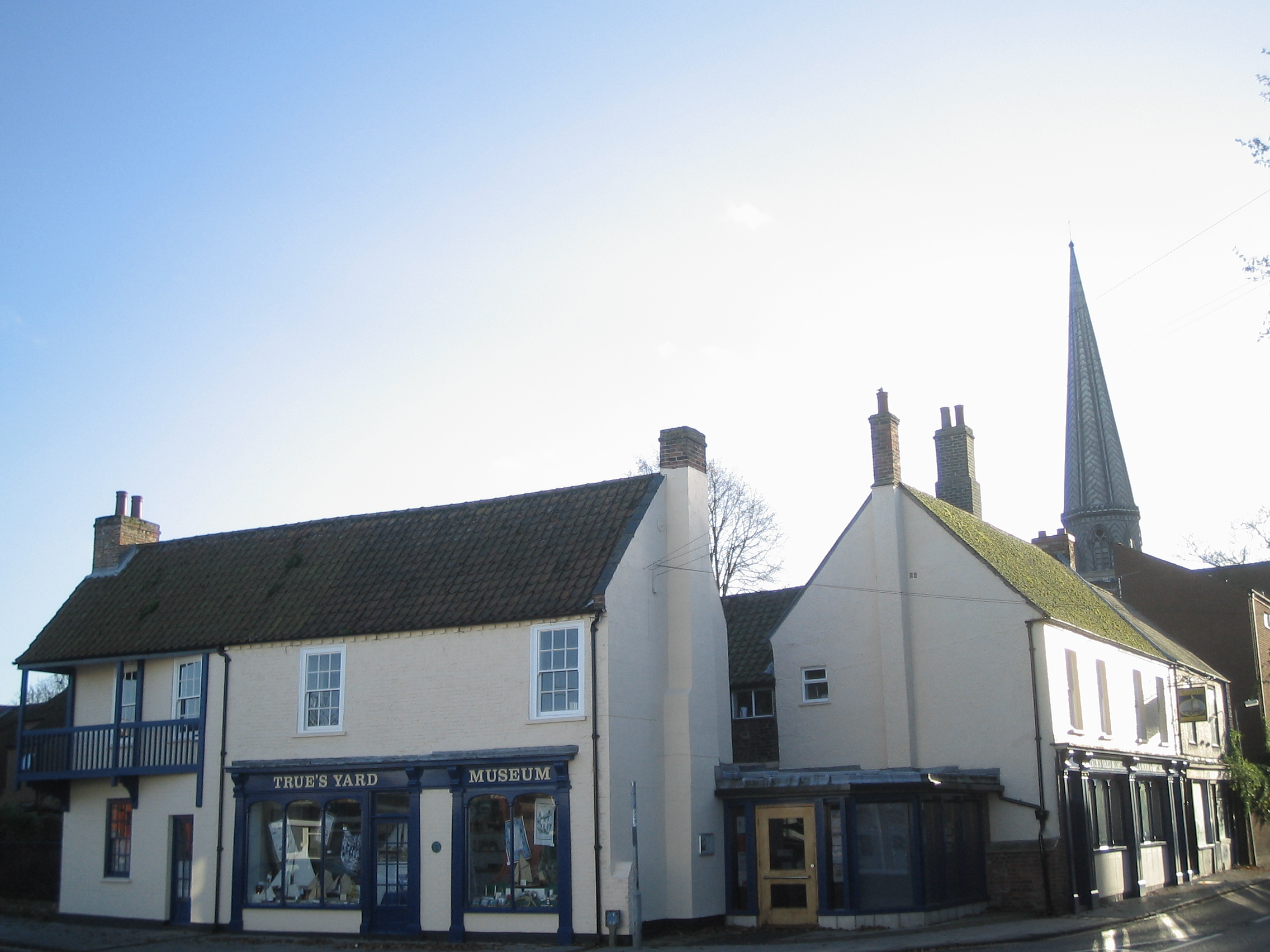
True's Yard, King's Lynn

== The cottages ==
The cottages consist of just two rooms, one upstairs and one downstairs. At one time in cottage no.5 a family of eleven squeezed into the tiny rooms. The nine children had to sleep in one double bed, top to tail, while the parents had to sleep on the floor. There were no toilet facilities, instead they used a chamber pot which was kept under the bed.

== The smokehouse ==
Opened in the 1890s by retired fisherman Thomas Westwood, along with his wife Mary and three daughters, Mary, Penelope and Emily. He also had two sons Thomas and Charles. The family also opened a fishmonger's in the front room of the house that faced St. Ann's Street, from which they sold the fish they smoked in the smokehouse situated to the rear.

A favourite smoked fish in the North End was the 'bloater' or a herring smoked whole.

== Publications ==
- Gifford, Alison Ghosts & Legends of Lynn King's Lynn: Trues Yard.
