= Lionel Ashfield =

British World War I flying ace

Lionel Arthur Ashfield
- Born: 1 August 1898; Wootton Bassett, Wiltshire, England
- Died: 16 July 1918 (aged 19); Zevekote, West Flanders, Belgium
- Burial place: Ramscappelle Road Military Cemetery, Nieuwpoort, West Flanders, Belgium
- Military career
- Allegiance: United Kingdom
- Branch: Royal Navy; Royal Air Force
- Rank: Lieutenant
- Units: No. 2 Squadron RNAS; No. 202 Squadron RAF
- Awards: Distinguished Flying Cross

Lieutenant Lionel Arthur Ashfield DFC (1 August 1898 – 16 July 1918) was a World War I British flying ace credited with seven aerial victories.

== Background ==
The second son of Charles Edmund Ashfield and his wife Ida Lucy Hunt, Lionel Arthur Ashfield was born on 1 August 1898 at Wootton Bassett, Wiltshire, England. He was christened there on 28 August 1898. His father was the headmaster of Hazelhurst School in Frant, East Sussex. Lionel attended Marlborough College in Marlborough, Wiltshire, where he played cricket. He was admitted to the school in September 1912 and left in the spring of 1917.

== Military career ==
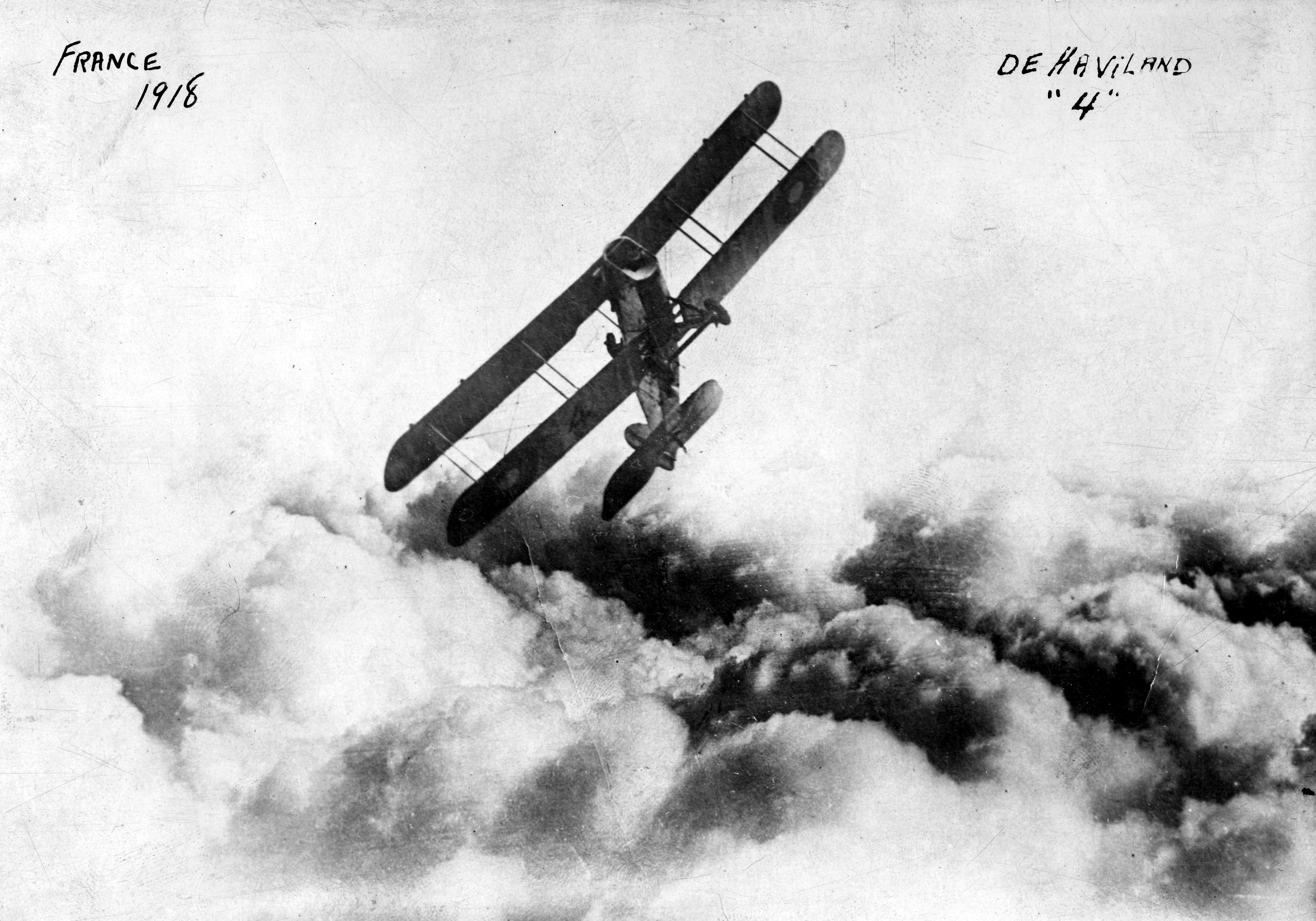
Airco de Havilland DH.4 soaring above the clouds in France.

RAF roundel at the time of World War I

Lionel Ashfield joined the Royal Naval Air Service on 29 April 1917. He was first stationed at Eastchurch, Isle of Sheppey, Kent in June 1917. He was posted to Cranwell, North Kesteven, Lincolnshire the following month. Ashfield became a flight sub-lieutenant on 29 August 1917. In September 1917, Ashfield was posted to Freiston, Lincolnshire. Later that month, the aviator served at Manston, Thanet, Kent. On 15 November 1917, Ashfield joined the No. 2 Squadron of the Royal Naval Air Service at Dunkirk (Dunkerque), Nord, France. After the 1 April 1918 merger of that branch with the Royal Flying Corps, he served as a lieutenant in the No. 202 Squadron of the 61st Wing of the newly formed Royal Air Force.

The British flying ace is credited with shooting down seven enemy aircraft during aerial combat. The 2009 auction site of three of his medals, as well as photocopies of his combat reports and service record, lists six of the seven aerial victories. Those listed include 27 February 1918 (first two), 18 March 1918 (third), 18 May 1918 (fourth), and 21 May 1918 (fifth and sixth). The victory of 18 May 1918 occurred while he was in his de Havilland DH.4 (A7868) flying over Bruges, West Flanders, Belgium. A seventh which took place on 31 May 1918, while flying over Ostend, West Flanders in the de Havilland DH.4 (D8402), is not specifically mentioned at the auction site, but has been previously documented.

On 27 June 1918, Lionel Ashfield and his observer Lieutenant N H Jenkins DSM engaged in aerial combat with enemy aircraft. Observer Jenkins was wounded in action near Middelkerke, with Ashfield piloting DH.4 (A7868).

On 3 August 1918, the London Gazette announced that Ashfield had been awarded the Distinguished Flying Cross (DFC). The citation for the DFC in the Gazette indicated that he was a "very capable officer of exceptional judgment and courage. He has carried out sixty-two flights behind the enemy lines with invariable success. During the last few months he has engaged seventeen enemy machines, and has been instrumental in destroying five. On one occasion he attacked five enemy aeroplanes, bringing down one in flames."

== Death ==
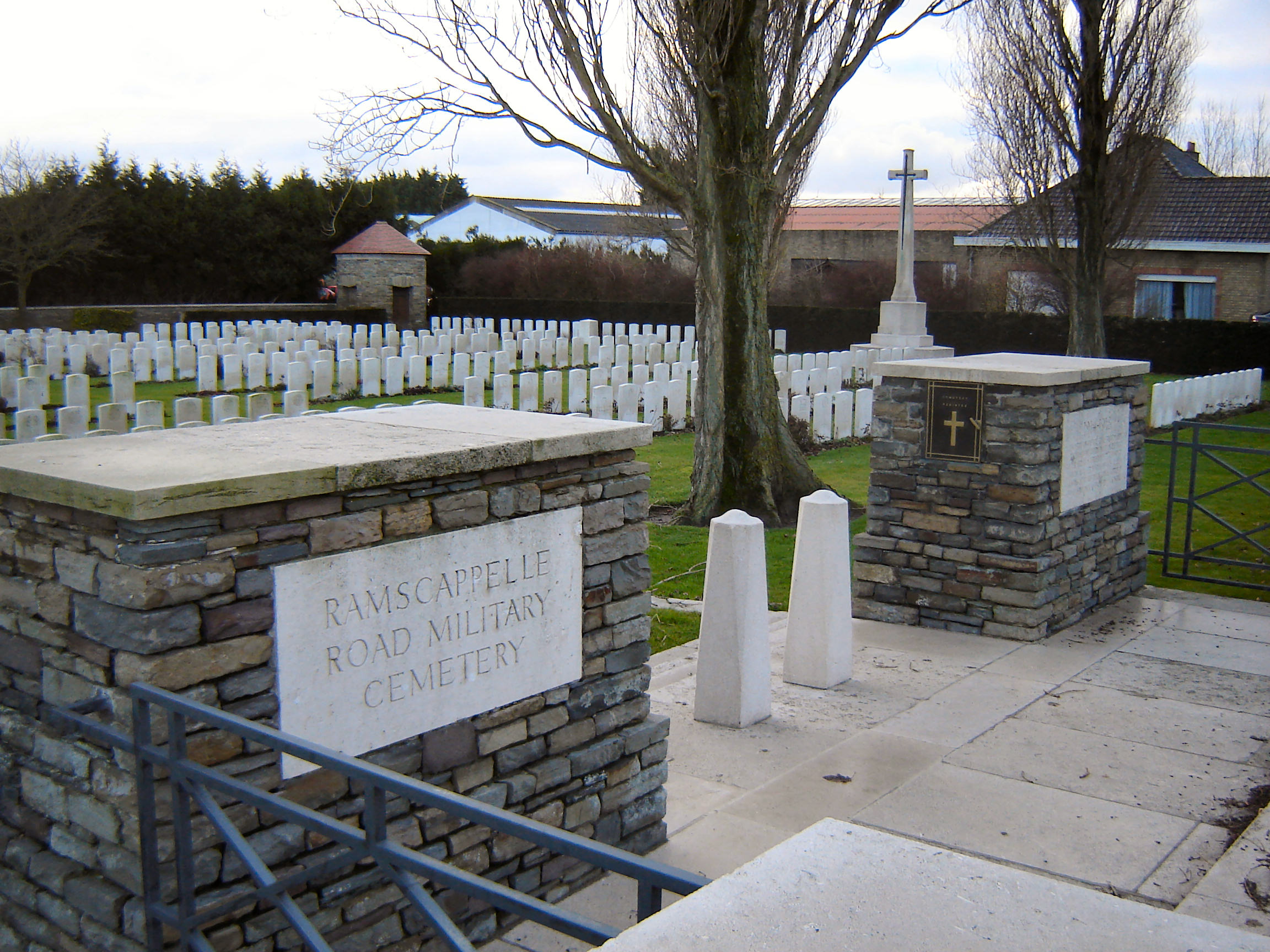
Ramscappelle Road Military Cemetery

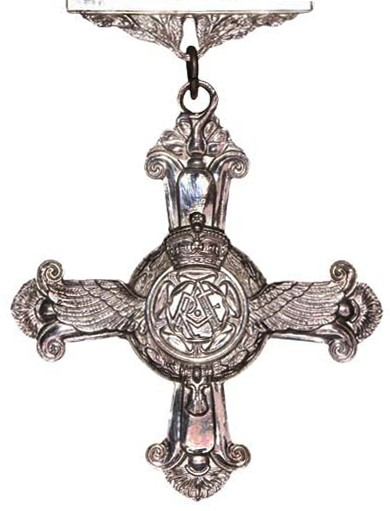
Distinguished Flying Cross

On 16 July 1918, Lieutenant Ashfield's Airco de Havilland DH.4 with serial number A7868 was shot down while returning from Bruges by Vizeflugmeister Hans Goerth over the village of Zevekote in West Flanders, Belgium. The aviator was reported missing that day. By 29 August, it had been announced that Lieutenant Lionel Arthur Ashfield had been killed in action. His observer, Lieutenant Maurice Graham English, also died in the aerial combat. During World War I, the German flying ace Hans Goerth was credited with seven aerial victories. The downing of Ashfield's de Havilland was the third of seven victories for Goerth. Ashfield was interred at the Ramscappelle Road Military Cemetery near Nieuwpoort in West Flanders. However, there is also a memorial tablet for the British aviator on the east wall of the nave of Saint Alban Church in Frant, East Sussex. The inscription on the cenotaph reads: "To the Glory of God and in the dear memory of Lionel Arthur Ashfield, D.F.C., R.A.F., Killed in action 16 July 1918, Second son of Charles and Ida Ashfield of Hazelhurst, Frant, aged 19 years. Faithful unto death."
