= Bernard Matthews =

British businessman and turkey farmer (1930–2010)

Bernard Matthews CVO CBE QSM
- Born: 24 January 1930; Brooke, Norfolk, England
- Died: 25 November 2010 (aged 80); Great Witchingham, Norfolk, England
- Occupation: Poultry farming
- Years active: 1950–2010
- Organization: Bernard Matthews Foods
- Spouse: Joyce Reid (m. 1952)
- Partner(s): Cornelia Elgershuizen; Natalie McCray; Odile Marteyn
- Children: 5
- Website: www.bernardmatthews.com/about/

Bernard Trevor Matthews (24 January 1930 – 25 November 2010) was the founder of Bernard Matthews Foods, a company that is best known for producing turkey meat products.

== Early life ==
Matthews was born on 24 January 1930 in Brooke, Norfolk, the son of a car mechanic and his housekeeper wife. Skilled at mathematics, he won a scholarship to the City of Norwich School but found it difficult to settle. As a result of this, he failed his exams. The headmaster refused to let Matthews' exam failure reduce the school's pass-rate and so Matthews left school with no qualifications.

== Career ==
Matthews worked as a trainee livestock auctioneer at Waters & Son between 1946 and 1948. During an auction at Acle market, he saw twenty freshly laid turkey eggs for sale, which he bought for a shilling each, and then acquired the same day a paraffin-oil incubator, which he bought for £1 10s. The venture to raise them in his future mother-in-law's back garden did not pay off, as he had not calculated for the additional cost of feed for the birds.

After serving his two-year national service in No. 617 Squadron RAF, Matthews became an insurance clerk, and started his company in 1950, buying more turkeys. He was only able to join the business full-time after spending £3,000 buying the dilapidated Great Witchingham Hall and filling its 35 rooms with turkeys. While Matthews and his wife lived in two unheated rooms, turkeys were hatched in the dining room, reared in the Jacobean bedrooms and slaughtered in the kitchens.

In 1980, the company launched its first TV commercial featuring Turkey Breast Roast, with Matthews himself introducing the famous "Bootiful" catchphrase in his Norfolk accent, and becoming part of what has been described as the "national consciousness".

In 2005, he penned the self-published autobiography Turkey Times. In January 2010, he retired from the position of Chairman of Bernard Matthews Farms at the age of 80.

== Honours ==
Matthews was awarded the Queen's Service Medal (QSM) by the New Zealand Government in the 1989 Birthday Honours, for services to the New Zealand meat industry.

He was appointed Commander of the Order of the British Empire (CBE) in the 1992 Birthday Honours, and appointed Commander of the Royal Victorian Order (CVO) in the 2007 New Year Honours, for services to the Duke of Edinburgh's Award. However, in view of the H5N1 outbreak in late January 2007 at his Holton plant, Matthews asked for the investiture on 9 February 2007, at which he had been due to receive the CVO, to be postponed.

== Personal life ==
In 1952, Matthews married Joyce Reid and he lived with her, in the grounds of Great Witchingham Hall, until the mid-1970s. They adopted three children, Kathleen, Jason and Victoria together. From then onwards they lived apart, and for eight years until the early 1980s Matthews lived with Dutchwoman Cornelia Elgershuizen, with whom he had a son, Frederick Elgershuizen. He spent the last 20 years of his life with Odile Marteyn, of whom he wrote "Odile has supported me unfailingly for many years and particularly so during my recent illnesses."

Matthews helped projects at Norwich Cathedral, Norwich Hospital, University of East Anglia, True's Yard Museum, Norwich Castle Museum, 2nd Air Division Memorial Library and others across Norfolk.

Matthews was a multi-millionaire with a fortune estimated at over £300 million – he owned a villa in St Tropez, a 160-foot (49-metre) superyacht named Bellissima (sold by the time of his death), a Cessna Citation II private jet, and a Rolls-Royce car. He died on 25 November 2010, aged 80. His death resulted in an inheritance dispute which saw his adopted children evicting his life partner, Odile, from the home he had shared with her for the last 20 years of his life, and which he had wished to leave to her.

== Popular culture ==
Matthews was referenced by the fictional character Alan Partridge, on the show Mid Morning Matters, as one of the greatest ever Norfolk residents "for his part in slaughtering near to a quarter of a billion turkeys".
