= Ramscappelle Road Military Cemetery =

Cemetery in Nieuwpoort, West Flanders, Belgium

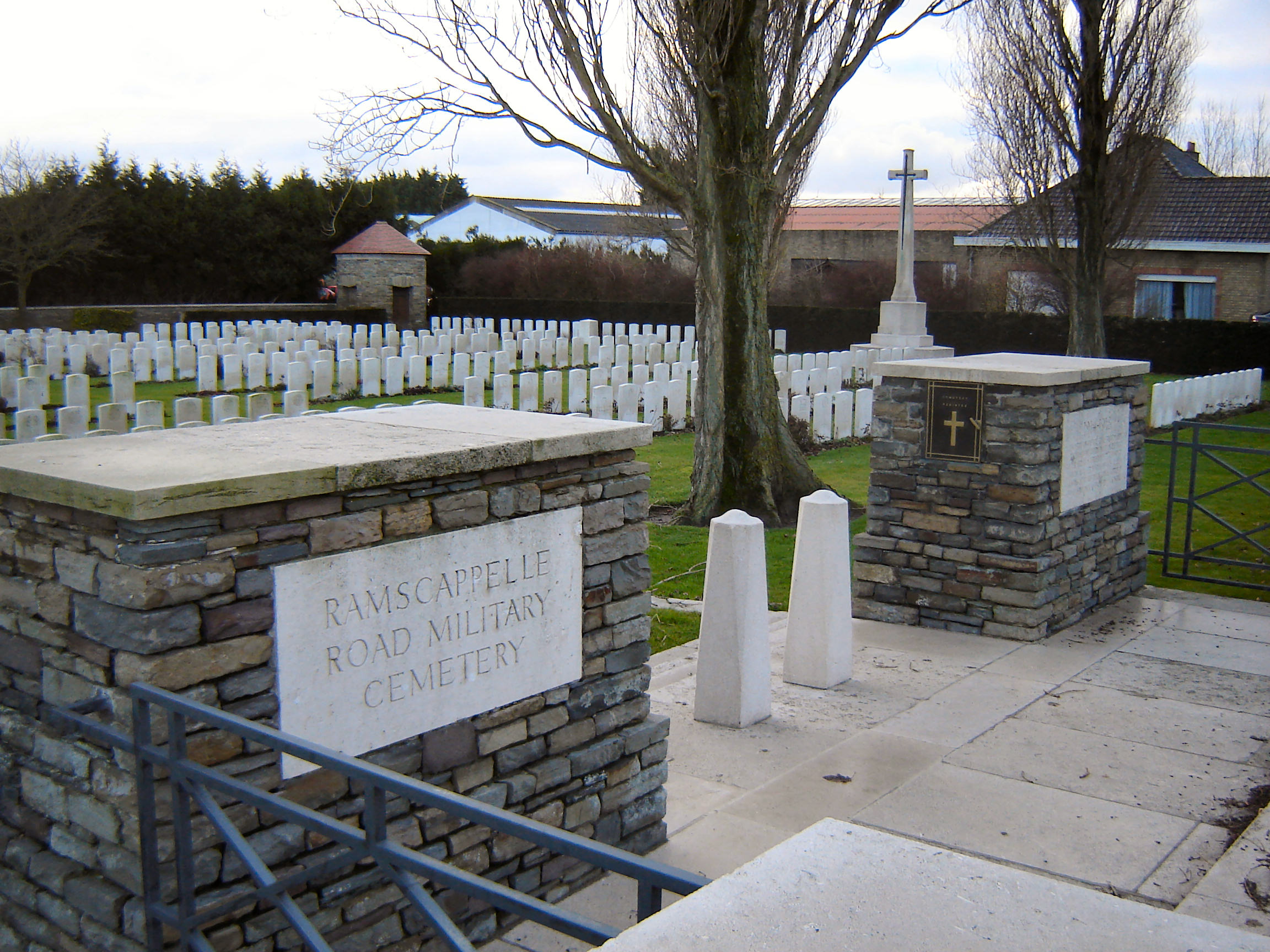
- Entrance, Ramscappelle Road Military Cemetery
- Interactive map of Ramscappelle Road Military Cemetery

Details
- Established: 1917
- Location: Brugse Steenweg 45, 8620 Nieuwpoort, West Flanders
- Country: Belgium
- Coordinates: 51.12872°N 2.76766°E
- Type: military
- No. of graves: 843
- No. of interments: 843

Founded in 1917, the Ramscappelle Road Military Cemetery is located two kilometers east of the city of Nieuwpoort in the province of West Flanders (West-Vlaanderen), Belgium. It is on the N367 (Brugse Steenweg), the road which leads from Nieuwpoort to the village of Sint-Joris, near the intersection with Ramscappelle Road (Ramskapellestraat).

== Design ==
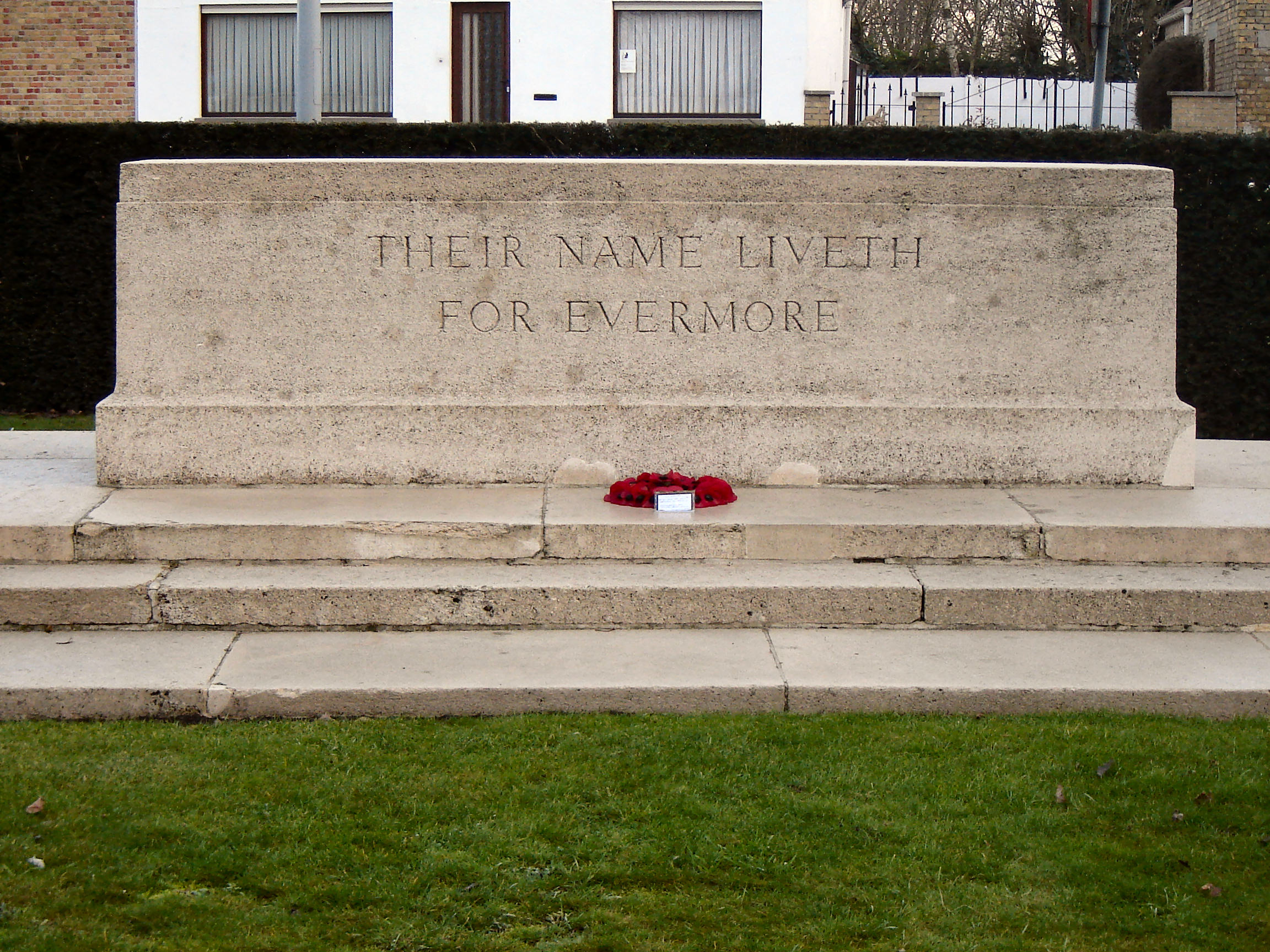
Stone of Remembrance

Ramscappelle Road Military Cemetery was designed by British architect Sir Edwin Lutyens, one of three principal architects that had been appointed by the Imperial War Graves Commission (now Commonwealth War Graves Commission) to design military cemeteries in France and Belgium, as well as memorials. Lutyens drew up the design for the cemetery on location. Later, a toolhouse, shelter, and south side wall were added to the design by assistant architect George Goldsmith. There is a War Stone, also known as a Stone of Remembrance, on the east side of the graveyard. This was designed by Lutyens for the Imperial War Graves Commission (now the Commonwealth War Graves Commission). It generally denotes a war cemetery with at least one thousand graves. Ramscappelle is an exception to this. The biblical phrase "Their Name Liveth For Evermore" on the War Stone was selected by author Rudyard Kipling. It is found on Stones of Remembrance around the world. Kipling, a member of the Imperial War Graves Commission (now Commonwealth War Graves Commission), also chose the phrase "Known unto God" for the gravestones of the unidentified. The Cross of Sacrifice directly opposite the War Stone, on the west side of the graveyard, was designed by Sir Reginald Blomfield, also for the commission. It usually indicates a war cemetery with at least fifty burials.

== Interments ==
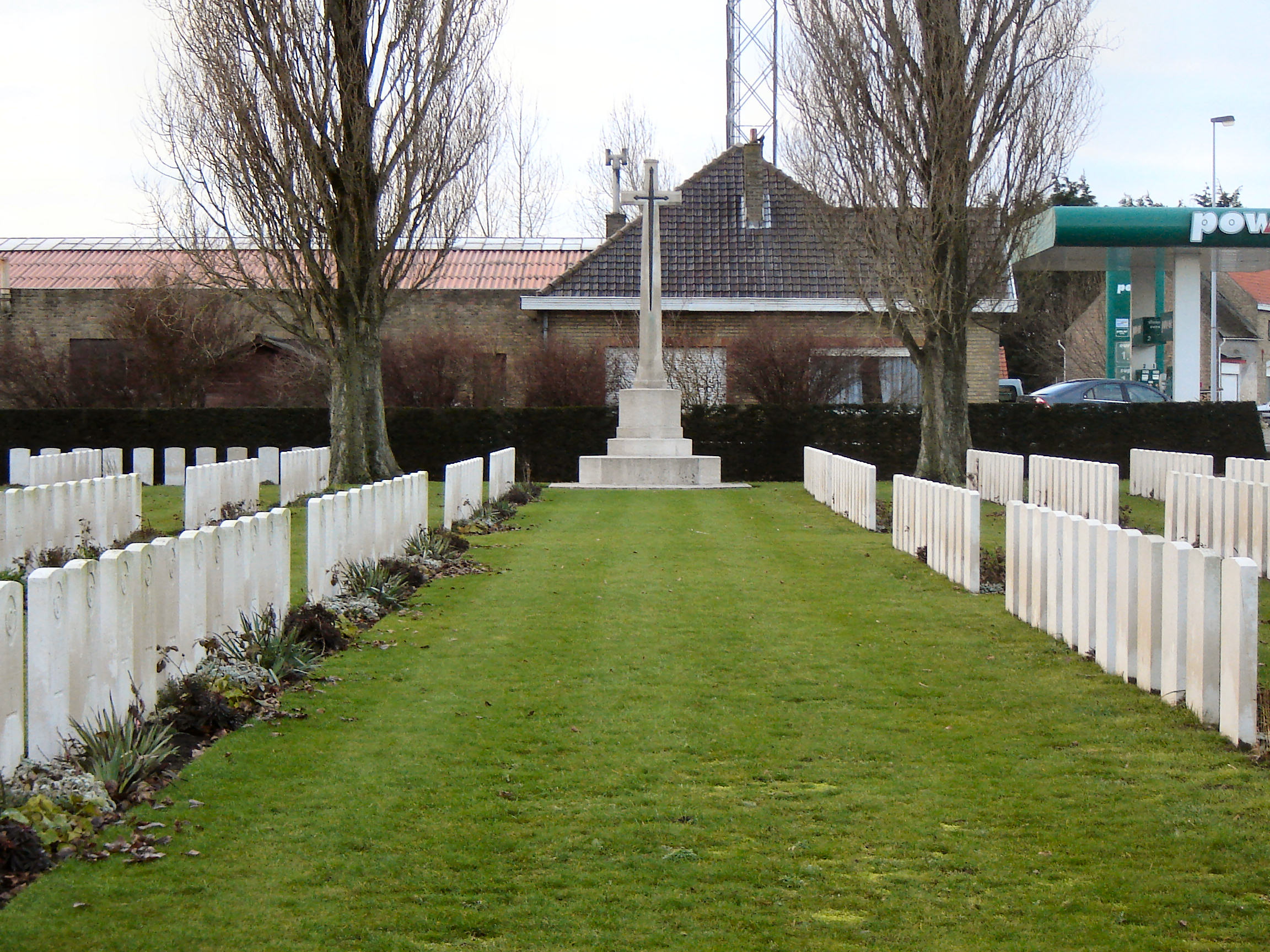
Cross of Sacrifice

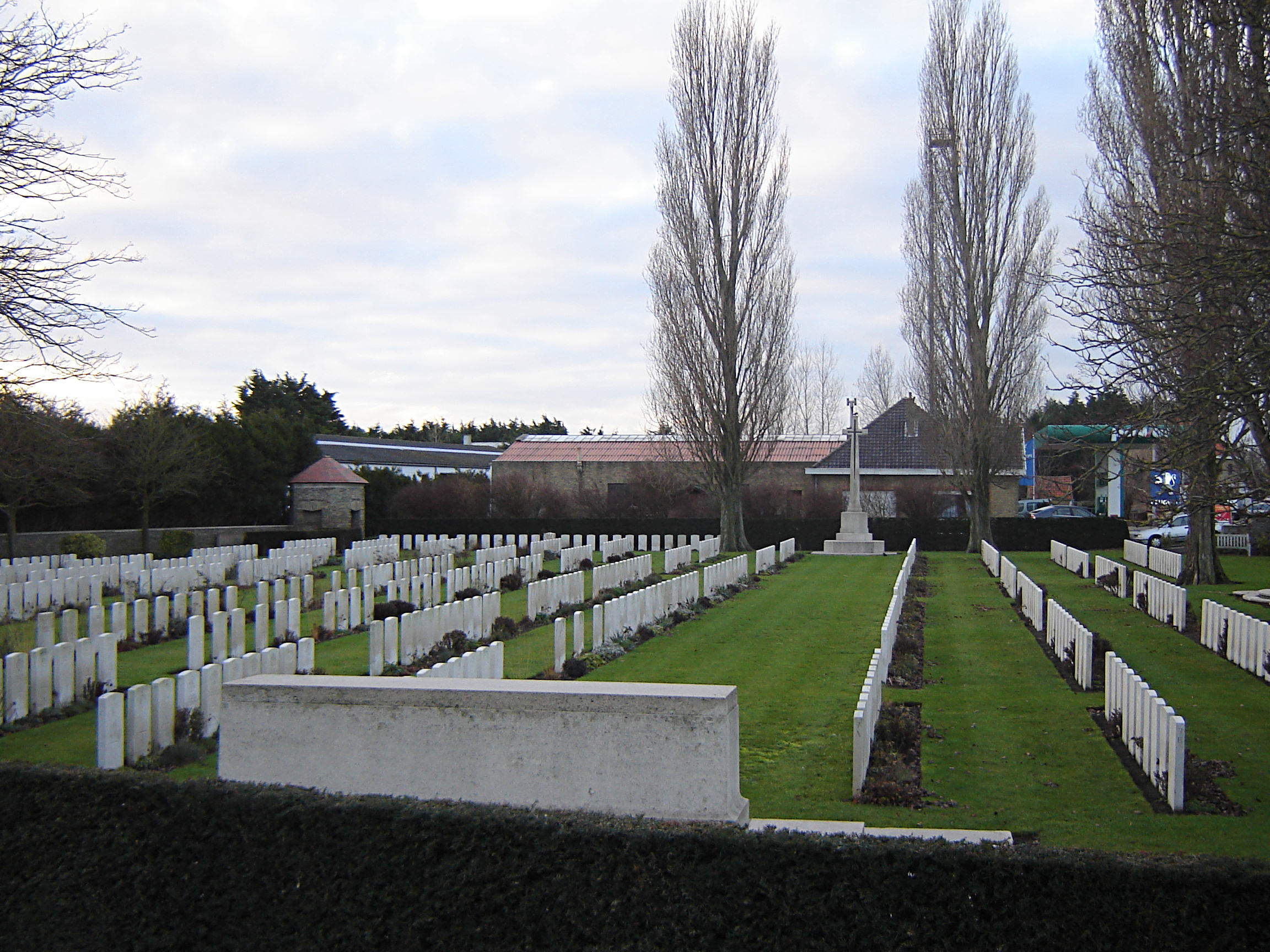
East–west axis of cemetery between War Stone and Cross of Sacrifice

Ramscappelle Road Military Cemetery started with Plot 1 in the middle of the graveyard. Most of the interments in Plot 1 were made in July and August 1917. The burial ground was substantially enlarged after the Armistice of November 1918. At that time, the remains of the deceased from the battlefields and a number of smaller cemeteries were brought to Ramscappelle for interment. Those smaller burial grounds included:

- Boitshoucke Churchyard
- Ghistelles German Cemetery
- Middelkerke German Cemetery
- Nieuport Military Cemetery
- Nieuport-Bains Military Cemeteries

Currently, there are 841 Commonwealth casualties of World War I who are either buried or commemorated in Ramscappelle Road Military Cemetery. Of those, 312 are unidentified. Included in that number are 26 special memorials to those initially interred at Nieuport or Nieuport-Bains, and whose graves were destroyed in battle. In addition to the above, 2 unidentified Foreign National burials are present, for a total of 843 graves in the cemetery. There are 529 identified casualties at Ramscappelle. Among those interred in the cemetery are World War I British flying aces Lieutenant Lionel Ashfield and Captain Harold Mellings.
