= Holton, Suffolk =

Village in Suffolk, England

Coordinates: 52.343°N 1.524°E

Holton
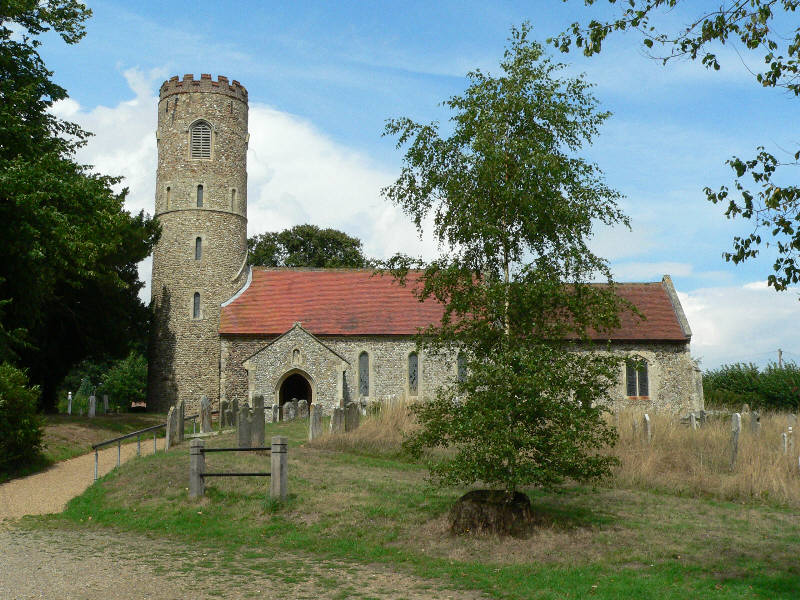
- Holton St Peter

- Location within Suffolk
- Area: 5.15 km^{2} (1.99 sq mi)
- Population: 832 (2011 census)
  - Density: 162/km^{2} (420/sq mi)
- Civil parish: Holton
- District: East Suffolk
- Shire county: Suffolk
- Region: East
- Country: England
- Sovereign state: United Kingdom
- Post town: Halesworth
- Postcode district: IP19
- Dialling code: 01986

Holton is a village and civil parish in the East Suffolk district, in the county of Suffolk, England, near the town of Halesworth, with a population of 832 in the 2011 Census. Holton is split into two parts – Upper Holton and Holton.

== History ==
Although it is often referred to as Holton St Peter, such as in the name of its primary school, the 'St Peter' suffix was adopted by some village institutions to prevent confusion with Holton St Mary, another village in Suffolk. However, a proposed name change was rejected by the Parish Council and the village officially remains 'Holton' to this day. Holton is an Anglo-Saxon place name meaning 'village in a hollow' and the site was probably inhabited from Neolithic times. A few Roman artefacts have been found locally and it is possible that the Blyth river was forded here (at Mells) as it lies on the route of an ancient trackway from Dunwich to Beccles.

Holton Hall, demolished in 1957 and replaced by a caravan park, had many famous connections to the anti-slavery movement and Barclays Bank.

== Features ==
The church of Holton St Peter is one of 38 existing round-tower churches in Suffolk built by the Normans in the 11th century.

Holton has a primary school, two shops – Market Fields Farm Shop and Holton Orchards Farm Shop - and a public house, the Lord Nelson. This closed in 2008 but was later extended and refurbished, and re-opened in 2013 as a restaurant and pub. It closed again in July 2015. Apart from Bernard Matthews Farms, there is a small industrial site at the airfield with small workshops and a feed store. The community produces a bi-monthly magazine, 'The Holton Post'. In 1814 John Brewster Wilkinson the son of john Wilkinson paid for the school to be built with an endowment of £200 a year (from whites directory of Suffolk 1842)

Holton also boasts a post mill, parts of which date back to the 18th century. The mill had been left in a state of disrepair in the 1960s but was rescued and has been restored on numerous occasions since, and its sails started working again in 1996. The mill is now under private ownership but is sometimes opened to the public.

== Avian flu outbreak ==
An outbreak of avian influenza of the H5N1 strain was confirmed on 3 February 2007, at a farm near Holton owned by Bernard Matthews.
