= Delsaux Farm Cemetery =

War cemetery in Pas-de-Calais, France

- Commonwealth War Graves Commission
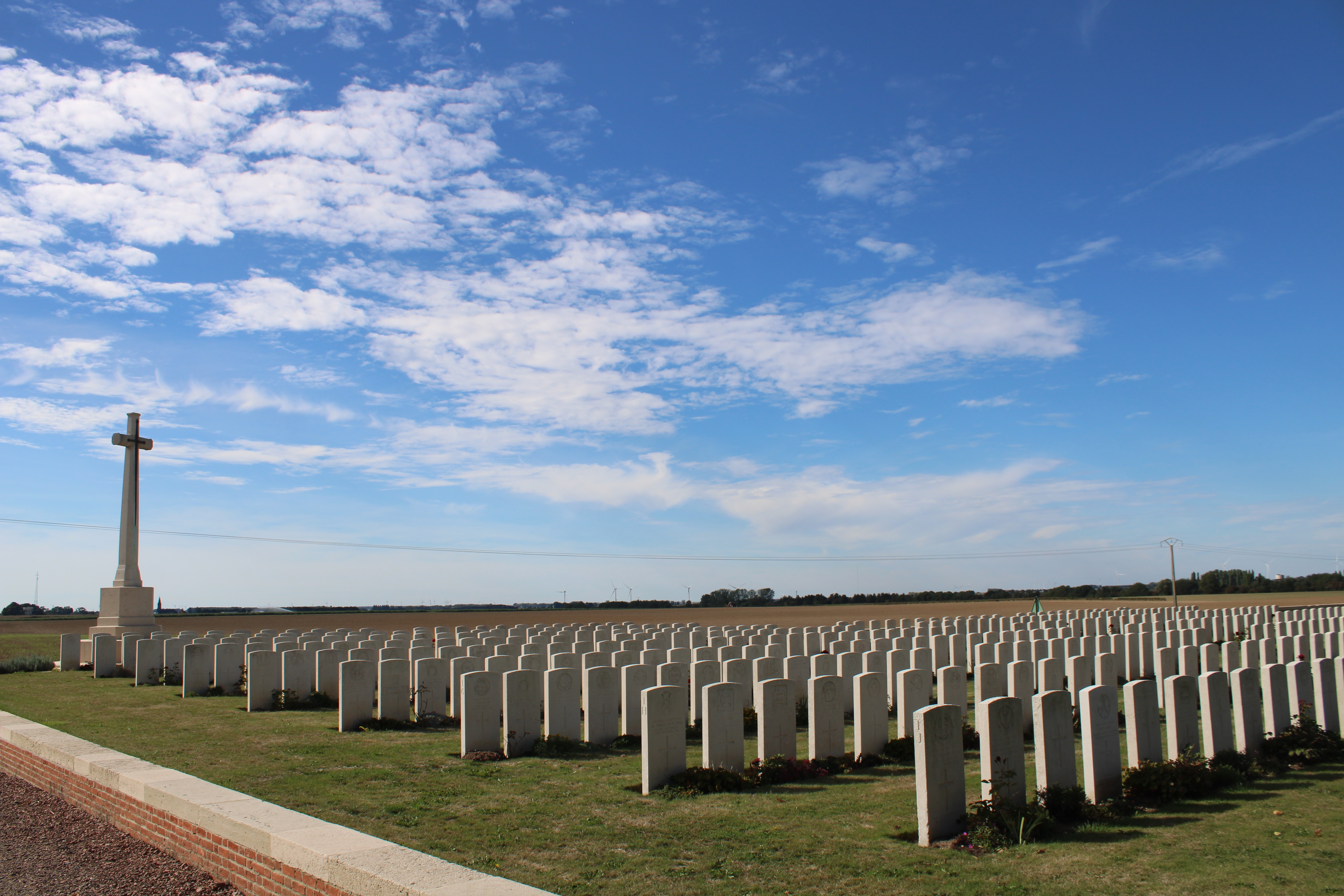
- For Commonwealth War Dead
- Established: March 1918
- Location: 50°06′32″N 02°56′03″E; Beugny near Beugny
- Designed by: Sir Edwin Lutyens
- Total burials: 495
- Unknowns: 61
- Commemorated: 495

Delsaux Farm Cemetery is a cemetery located in the French municipality of Beugny (Pas-de-Calais). The military graves are maintained by the Commonwealth War Graves Commission.

The cemetery contains 495 burials and commemorations of the First World War. 61 of the burials are unidentified and 32 others, identified as a whole but not individually, are marked with headstones inscribed "Buried near this spot".
