= Comper =

Comper is a surname. Notable people with the surname include:

- F. Anthony Comper (born 1945), known as Tony Comper, is a Canadian banker
- John Comper (1823–1903), Anglican Priest who served in the Episcopal Church in Scotland
- Nicholas Comper (1897–1939), English aviator and aircraft designer
- Ninian Comper (1864–1960), Scottish architect

== See also ==
- Château de Comper, castle located in Paimpont forest (formerly known as Brocéliande) in the département of Morbihan, Bretagne, France
- Comper Aircraft Company, 1930s British light aircraft manufacturer
  - Comper Kite, single engined, two seat touring monoplane
  - Comper Mouse, 1930s British three-seat cabin monoplane
  - Comper Streak, single engined, single seat racing monoplane
  - Comper Swift, British 1930s single-seat sporting aircraft
