= Cranwell Light Aeroplane Club =

The Cranwell Light Aeroplane Club was formed in 1923 by staff and students of the RAF College Cranwell to design and build light aircraft. One of the members was Flight Lieutenant Nicholas Comper who became the Chief Designer. Comper and the club designed and built four aircraft with the last three types being flown.

== Aircraft ==
- CLA.1 - The Cranwell CLA.1 was the first attempt by the Club to design an aircraft but was never built.
- CLA.2 - The Cranwell CLA.2 was a two-seat single-engined biplane designed and built for the 1924 Lympne light aircraft trials. It was first flown at Cranwell at 14 September 1924 and went on to win the £300 Reliability Prize at Lympne. After the light plane trials the CLA.2 went to RAF Martlesham Heath for evaluation but it was written off by an Air Ministry pilot. The Air Ministry compensated the club for the loss and this was used to fund the next project.
- CLA.3 - The Cranwell CLA.3 was designed to compete in the 1925 Lympne light aircraft trials, a high-wing braced monoplane powered by a Bristol Cherub engine. It won the International Speed Race at Lympne when it achieved 86.92 mph. The CLA.3 was scrapped in 1929.

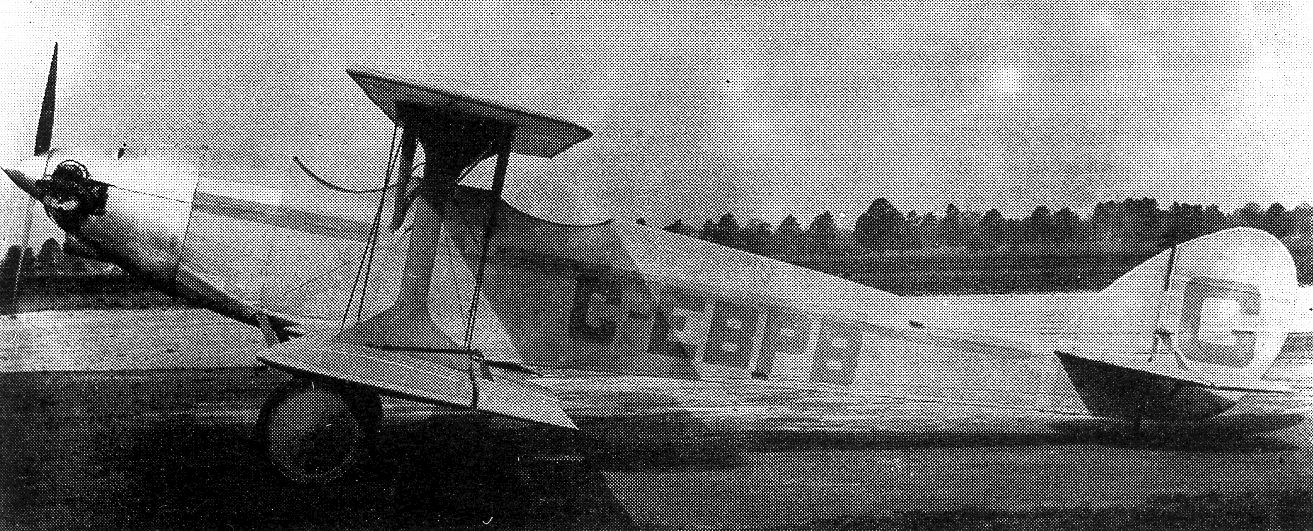
CLA.4

- CLA.4 - Two Cranwell CLA.4s were built for the 1926 Lympne light aircraft trials, they were two-seat inverted sesquiplanes. The first aircraft was flown by Comper at the trials but was withdrawn with a damaged landing gear. The second aircraft was destroyed in a crash in March 1927.
- CLA.7 - The Comper CLA.7 Swift was designed by Comper for the Club but was built after he left the Royal Air Force by his company Comper Aircraft Company.
