= Cierva C.25 =

C.25

General information
- Type: Single-seat autogyro
- Manufacturer: Comper Aircraft Company Ltd
- Designer: Nicholas Comper
- Number built: 1

History
- First flight: 1933

The Cierva C.25 was a British 1930s single-seat autogiro produced by Comper Aircraft Company Ltd of Hooton Park, Cheshire.

== Design and development ==
The sole C.25, based on the airframe of the Comper Swift with modified tailfins and short low-mounted wings, received the civil registration G-ABTO. It was the first autogiro to use the Pobjoy Cataract 7-cylinder geared radial engine.

== Specifications ==
Data from Cierva C.25 Blueprint

General characteristics

- Crew: 1
- Length: 17 ft 8.5 in (5.398 m) fuselage only
- Wingspan: 13 ft 6 in (4.11 m) wings only
- Powerplant: 1 × Pobjoy R 7-cylinder geared radial piton engine, 85 hp (63 kW)
- Main rotor diameter: 27 ft (8.2 m)
- Main rotor area: 572.63 sq ft (53.199 m^{2})
- Propellers: 2-bladed fixed-pitch propeller, 6 ft 6 in (1.98 m) diameter

Performance
