= Comper Streak =

Racing plane

Streak
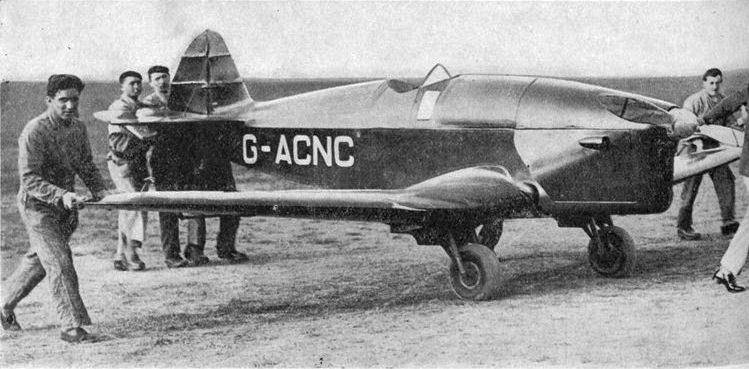

General information
- Type: Single-seat racing aircraft
- National origin: United Kingdom
- Manufacturer: Comper Aircraft Company
- Designer: Nicholas Comper
- Primary user: 1

History
- First flight: 12 April 1934

The Comper Streak was a single-engined, single-seat racing monoplane built in the UK in the mid-1930s. It was not successful as a racer and only one was produced.

== Development ==
The Comper Aircraft Company's first product, the high wing single-seat Comper Swift sold quite well and had some race success. Their second, the low wing three-seat Mouse was a lone aircraft that won no races. Nicholas Comper had always hoped for wins in prestigious air races and the low wing, single-seat Streak was built to that end. It had a fuselage based on the Swift and its wings were scaled down versions of those of the Mouse.

Originally the Streak was intended to compete in the Portsmouth International Races of 1933 but, owing to political and economic problems of the time, these were not held. So, instead, the Streak was entered into the 1934 competition for the Deutsch de la Muerthe Cup. This determined the choice of engine, as the competition rules set a limiting capacity of 8 litres, though supercharging was allowed. Comper's choice for the Streak was a special high-compression 146 hp (109 kW) de Havilland Gipsy Major, a 6.1 litre, normally aspirated engine which left the Streak short of power compared with his competitors from France. He got through the first round at an average speed of about 187 mph (300 km/h), but was forced to drop out with undercarriage retraction problems; but the winner averaged 244 mph (393 km/h), so the Streak, the only non-French entry, was outclassed.

The wings of the Streak were built up around a pair of spruce and plywood box section spars, carrying three-ply and spruce ribs and skinned with stressed three-ply sheet. They were gently tapering in plan with rounded tips. There was 5° dihedral outboard, but none on the centre section. Mass balanced ailerons filled more than half of the trailing edge. The mass balances, not fitted for the initial flights, were conspicuously mounted on extended upward arms from near the aileron root. The tailplane and split elevators were also of spruce and plywood, but fabric covered. The rounded fin and rudder, though fabric covered had a steel tube structure. Like the elevators, the rudder was not horn balanced; it extended to the bottom of the fuselage, operating in a cut-out between the elevators.

The rectangular cross-section fuselage consisted of four spruce Warren girders, fabric covered behind the engine. The cockpit was at the trailing edge of the wing and behind there was a deep, rounded fabric covered decking. In front of the cockpit the decking was continued in aluminium, enclosing the fuel tank. Forward of this and beyond a firewall, the inverted in-line engine was mounted on a frame of square section steel members. It drove a two bladed metal propeller. Comper was an early adopter of retractable undercarriages for light aircraft at a time when the balance of advantage between drag loss and weight penalty was not obvious. The main wheels of the Streak were mounted at the end of the wing centre section, each between pairs of compression legs. Pairs of cross braced struts, joining the legs a little way above the axle and hinged at top and bottom, rotated to retract the wheels rearwards. In common with many aircraft of the time, the retracted undercarriage left a part of the wheel exposed, to give some protection in a wheels up landing. The wheels, which had brakes, were retracted manually via a heavily geared down, bicycle chain drive. At the rear there was a simple, sprung tailskid.

The Streak first flew on 12 April 1934 with Comper at the controls. Apart from aileron flutter at speed, cured by installing the mass balances, the sole Streak, registered G-ACNC flew well enough, but made no impression in the King's Cup races of 1934 and 1935. On both occasions the Streak had to retire early. Its average speed in these races was about 175 mph (280 km/h). Comper Aircraft ceased trading in August 1934 and by the time of the 1935 race their affairs were in the hands of the Heston Aircraft Company, who had their own designs. The Streak was scrapped at Heston in 1937.

== Specifications ==
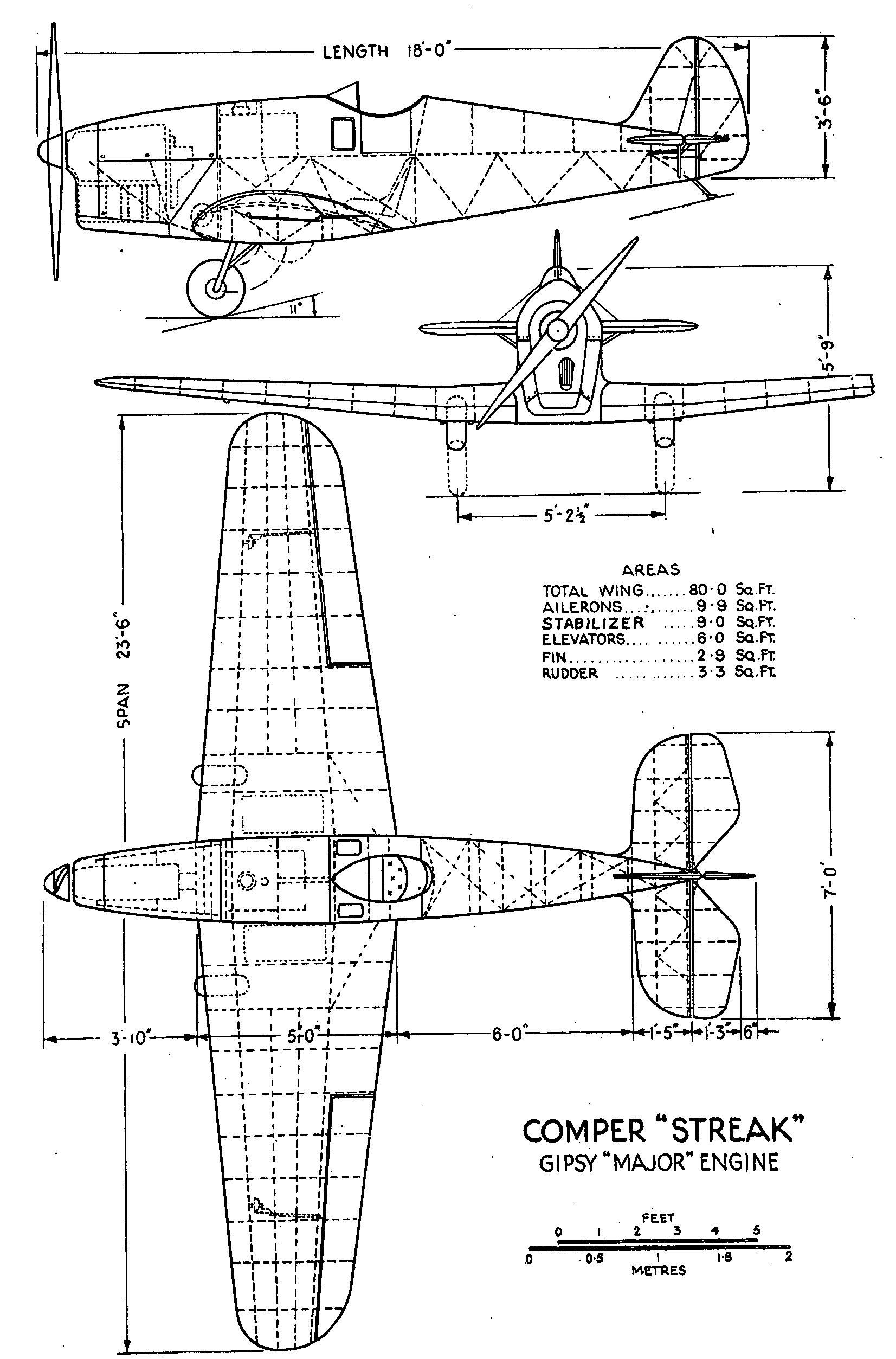
Comper Streak 3-view drawing from NACA-AC-194

Data from Flight 19 April 1934 p.378-9

General characteristics

- Crew: 1
- Length: 18 ft 0 in (5.49 m)
- Wingspan: 23 ft 6 in (7.16 m)
- Height: 5 ft 9 in (1.75 m)
- Wing area: 80 sq ft (7.4 m^{2})
- Airfoil: RAF 34
- Empty weight: 880 lb (399 kg)
- Gross weight: 1,429 lb (648 kg)
- Powerplant: 1 × de Havilland Gipsy Major 4-cylinder air cooled in-line inverted piston engine; a special high compression version, 146 hp (109 kW)

Performance

- Maximum speed: 175 mph (282 km/h, 152 kn) estimate, see race speeds

== Notes ==
=== Cited sources ===
- Jackson, A.J. (1959). British Civil Aircraft 1919-59. Vol. 1. London: Putnam Publishing.
- Ord-Hume, Arthur W.J.G. (2000). British Light Aeroplanes. Peterborough: GMS Enterprises. ISBN 978-1-870384-76-6.
- "Comper Streak". Flight. No. 19 April 1934. pp. 337–81.
