= Modular Initial Officer Training Course =

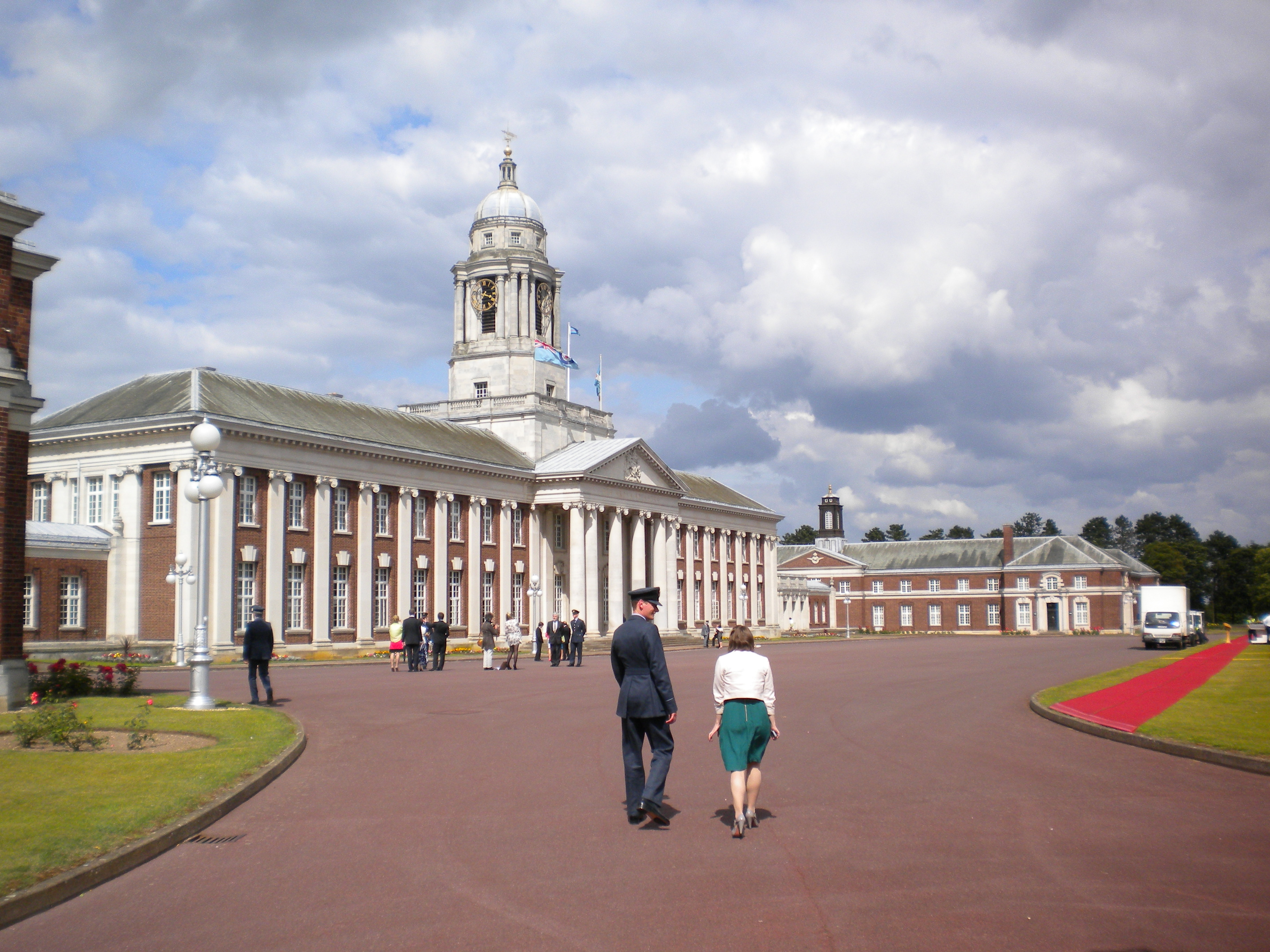
MIOT Graduates in front of CHOM

The Modular Initial Officer Training Course (MIOTC) is the 24 week initial officer training course all potential Royal Air Force officers must complete to receive their commission. It is hosted at RAF Cranwell by the RAF Officer Training Academy (OTA).

== History ==
MIOTC was brought in as a replacement for Initial Officer Training Course (IOTC) in 2020.This change encompassed a slight syllabus change, but primarily focused on the modularisation of the programme, breaking down the training into 4 distinct modules. This clear break down enabled individuals with past military experience (Service Entrants (SE)) to join the course at a later date than those without (Direct Entrants (DE)). This typically manifests with SE entrants joining at the beginning of Module 2.

== Course Content ==
The 24 week course is broken down into four 6 week modules. Remedial training weeks between these modules can lead to the overall course length exceeding the advertised 24 week duration.

=== Module 1 - Military Skills ===
Module 1 is focussed on militarisation, acclimatising recruits to the military environment. This process involves high levels of physical training (PT), drill training and training on uniform maintenance. This module also provides foundational fieldcraft, first aid, weapons handling, Chemical Biological Radiological and Nuclear (CBRN) and control of entry training. Additionally this module begins the process of General Service Knowledge (GSK) learning, which continues for the remainder of the course).

Module 1 is assessed through Exercise Phoenix Edge, a summative assessment of the practical field skills learned throughout this module. It is typically run as a 3-day field exercise.

=== Module 2 - Development 1 ===
Module 2 begins the courses focus on leadership development. The motto of this stage is learning to "lead self to lead others". To achieve this, the module includes a one-week trip to the Robson Resilience Centre in Crickhowell, Wales. This trip aims to improve resilience and teamwork whilst developing Adventurous Training (AT) skills that will be useful later in the module and course. The remainder of the course focuses on command, leadership and management training. At this stage officer cadets will begin their Air and Space Power training.

The module is assessed with three exercises. First is the Practical Leadership Exercise (PLE1), which is a formative scenario driven leadership exercise. These are followed by Exercise Dynamic Edge and Exercise Eagles Edge, which both aim to assess practical leadership skills in an AT setting.

=== Module 3 - Development 2 ===
Module 3 continues the command, leadership and management training, however now with more of a focus on indoor activities. This brings into focus line management skills, welfare management and care in leadership. In this module officer cadets are introduced to Air Command and Control (AirC2).

This module is formatively assessed in Exercise Commanders Edge, an office based AirC2 scenario driven assessment.

At this stage a higher level of personal responsibility is awarded to the officer cadets, with them gaining personal responsibility for their PT and being awarded other perks dependent on their flights performance.

=== Module 4 - Consolidation ===
Module 4 is primarily used for assessments and graduation preparation. In this module officer cadets will be assessed in Exercise Highlands Edge, Exercise Astra Edge, Exercise First Week and in an Air and Space Power presentation. Assuming success in this summative assessments cadets will go on to complete their graduation in front of College Hall Officers Mess (CHOM) before proceeding to their phase 2 training.
