= Comper Swift =

British single-seat sporting aircraft (1930–1933)

Swift
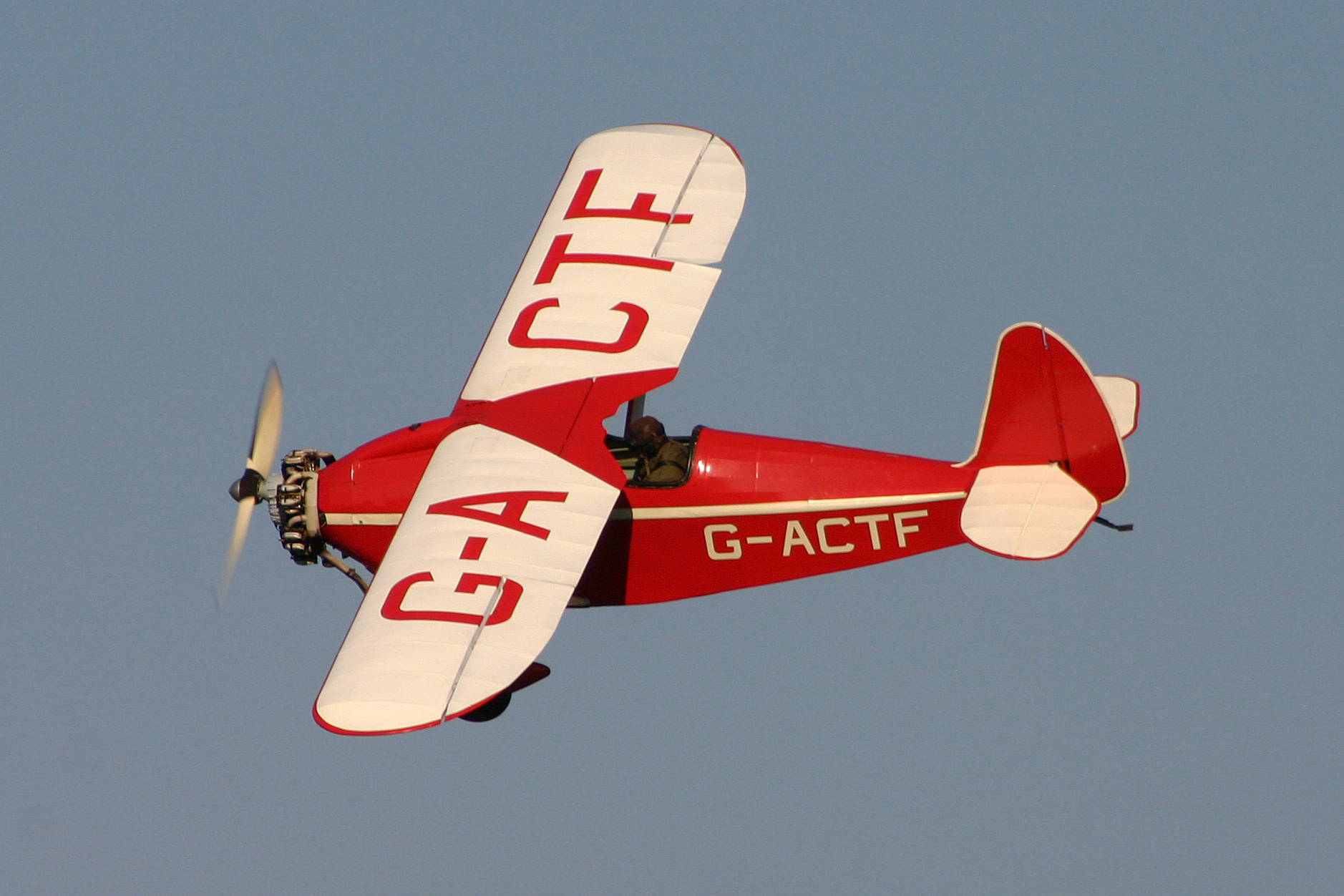

General information
- Type: Single-seat sporting aircraft
- Manufacturer: Comper Aircraft Company Ltd
- Designer: Nicholas Comper
- Number built: 45

History
- Manufactured: 1930–1933
- First flight: January 1930

The Comper C.L.A.7 Swift is a British single-seat sporting aircraft designed and produced by the Comper Aircraft Company. It was the company's first aircraft.

The Swift was designed shortly after Nicholas Comper’s departure from the Royal Air Force to focus on the project. It was designed to be an affordable and compact aircraft that was capable of equivalent performance to that of typical twin-seat light aircraft of the era. The prototype aircraft performed its maiden flight during January 1930; quantity production proceeded shortly thereafter. The majority of aircraft produced were powered by the Pobjoy P radial engine.

It proved to be a relatively successful long-distance touring aircraft, conducting multi-day flights to Australia and across the United States amongst other destinations. The Swift gained particular notoriety for its participation in various air races, regularly proving itself to be competitive. One aircraft, owned by the then-Prince of Wales and future King Edward VIII, won second place in the 1932 King's Cup Race. It continued to be appear in air races, particularly those held in Britain, through to the mid-1950s.

== Development ==
In March 1929, Flight Lieutenant Nicholas Comper left the Royal Air Force and formed the Comper Aircraft Company with the purpose of building an aircraft that he had designed, which he named the Comper Swift. Prior to this, Comper had designed and flown three aircraft for the Cranwell Light Aeroplane Club, these being the C.L.A.2, C.L.A.3 and C.L.A.4. The Swift would most closely resemble the C.L.A.3, but represented a considerable advance on this aircraft in terms of its performance, controllability, comfort, and appearance.

A key design goal set by Comper for the Swift was to minimise the presence of blind spots, a factor that had undermined the prospects of countless aircraft that were otherwise ideal. This principal of prioritising optimal external visibility for the pilot dictated many attributes and characteristics of the aircraft, such as the placement of the cockpit aft of the high-mounted wing. This in turn necessitated the use of a relatively lightweight engine in order to maintain appropriate weight distribution across the aircraft as there was a considerable amount of vertical surface area placed forward of the center of gravity. Consequentially, to draw the aircraft's center of vertical area aft of the center of gravity, a relatively large tail unit, particularly in terms of the fin and rudder, were present to draw the center of vertical area aft of the aircraft's center of gravity.

During January 1930, the prototype Swift (registered G-AARX) performed its maiden flight at Hooton Park. This initial aircraft was powered by a 40 hp (30 kW) ABC Scorpion piston engine. After successful tests, seven more aircraft were built in 1930, powered by a 50 hp Salmson A.D.9 radial engine. Trials with Pobjoy P radial engine for use in air racing resulted in all the subsequent aircraft being powered by the Pobjoy R. The last three factory-built aircraft (sometimes referred to as the Gipsy Swift) were fitted with de Havilland Gipsy engines – two with 120 hp (89 kW) Gipsy Major III, and one with a 130 hp (97 kW) Gipsy Major.

== Design ==
The Comper Swift was a compact single-seat monoplane aircraft with a high-mounted wing. It was designed as an affordable and low-powered aircraft, albeit one that could deliver performance equal to that of contemporary twin-seat light aircraft. The Swift had a relatively slim appearance with various clean and aesthetically pleasing lines, the fuselage being heavily streamlined, except for the cockpit and a fairly restrictive width adhered to. Despite this, a relatively comfortable cockpit was provisioned along with clear and well-positioned instrumentation, much of it being installed on a dedicated dash. Of particular note was the engine mounting, which incorporated a patented vibration-absorbing design that proved to be quite effective in practice.

In terms of overall construction, the Swift was primarily composed of spruce and covered by fabric. It shared considerable structural similarity to Comper's previous aircraft designs; the fuselage comprising a lightweight girder composed of longerons and diagonal struts which attached to the longerons via three-ply wood gussets. This structure was relatively strong for its low weight and did not require any realignment even with prolonged use. The fuselage was constructed out of three separate units, the front section carried the engine mounting, the middle portion contained the cockpit, while the rear section carried the tail unit.

The aircraft had a monoplane wing that rested on a relatively narrow portion of fuselage while the inefficient portion of wing area within the center was kept proportionally small. An almost pure cantilever stabiliser was used that was braced by a single pair of v-shaped struts on each side of the fuselage. It featured relatively straightforward construction, consisting of a pair of spruce spars and light girder ribs. It was built in three sections, the relatively narrow center section of which was built as an integral part of the fuselage and resting on two separate bulkheads. The wing was designed to be folded so that the aircraft only required a minimal storage footprint. All of the wing's fittings were composed of standard steel plate while the covering was composed of fabric.

A somewhat unorthodox undercarriage arrangement was used; elements such as the shock absorbers were entirely housed inside of the fuselage, reducing drag. The legs directly connected with various internal members. The axles were bent while rearward-sloping radius rods were used to orientate the wheels. A deck fairing aft of the engine accommodated the aircraft's fuel tank; fuel was supplied via gravity to the engine. This tank, which had a total capacity of nine gallons, had a partition that separated one gallon from the rest and could function as a reserve tank.

== Operational history ==
The Comper Swift established a formidable reputation during the 1930s as a premier racing and touring aircraft, frequently outperforming larger and more powerful machines. Its operational history is most famously marked by Arthur Butler's record-breaking flight in 1931, where he flew a Pobjoy-powered Swift (G-ABRE) from England to Darwin, Australia, in just over nine days. This feat demonstrated the aircraft's surprising durability and range, despite its diminutive size. Other notable long-distance exploits included Lieutenant Commander C. Byas's 10-day solo flight to Cape Town and Alban Ali's journey from India to Egypt in the "Scarlet Angel," which was later rebuilt and continued to race in the United Kingdom for decades.

In the competitive arena of British air racing, the Swift was a perennial fixture, appearing in every King's Cup Air Race between 1930 and 1937. The aircraft's high power-to-weight ratio and clean aerodynamics allowed it to secure numerous podium finishes, most notably in 1932 when Flight Lieutenant Edward Fielden piloted a Gipsy-engined Swift owned by the Prince of Wales (the future King Edward VIII) to second place. Renowned aviator Alex Henshaw also launched his storied career in a Swift, winning the Siddeley Trophy at the 1933 King's Cup. The aircraft's agility and speed—reaching up to 140 mph—made it a favorite among sporting pilots who valued performance over cockpit space, which famously had just enough room for a pilot and a set of golf clubs.

Following World War II, the surviving Comper Swifts transitioned into the vintage and enthusiast circuit, remaining competitive in handicap racing well into the 1950s. Pilots like Ron Clear and A.L. Cole maintained the type's presence in events such as the Daily Express Air Race, where they often outpaced more modern light aircraft. Of the roughly 45 Swifts originally produced, several have been meticulously preserved or restored to flying condition. Today, the operational legacy of the Swift is carried on by organizations like the Shuttleworth Collection, which operates G-ACTF (the former "Scarlet Angel"), allowing modern audiences to witness the same spirited flight characteristics that made the "pocket racer" a legend of the Interwar period.

== Surviving aircraft ==
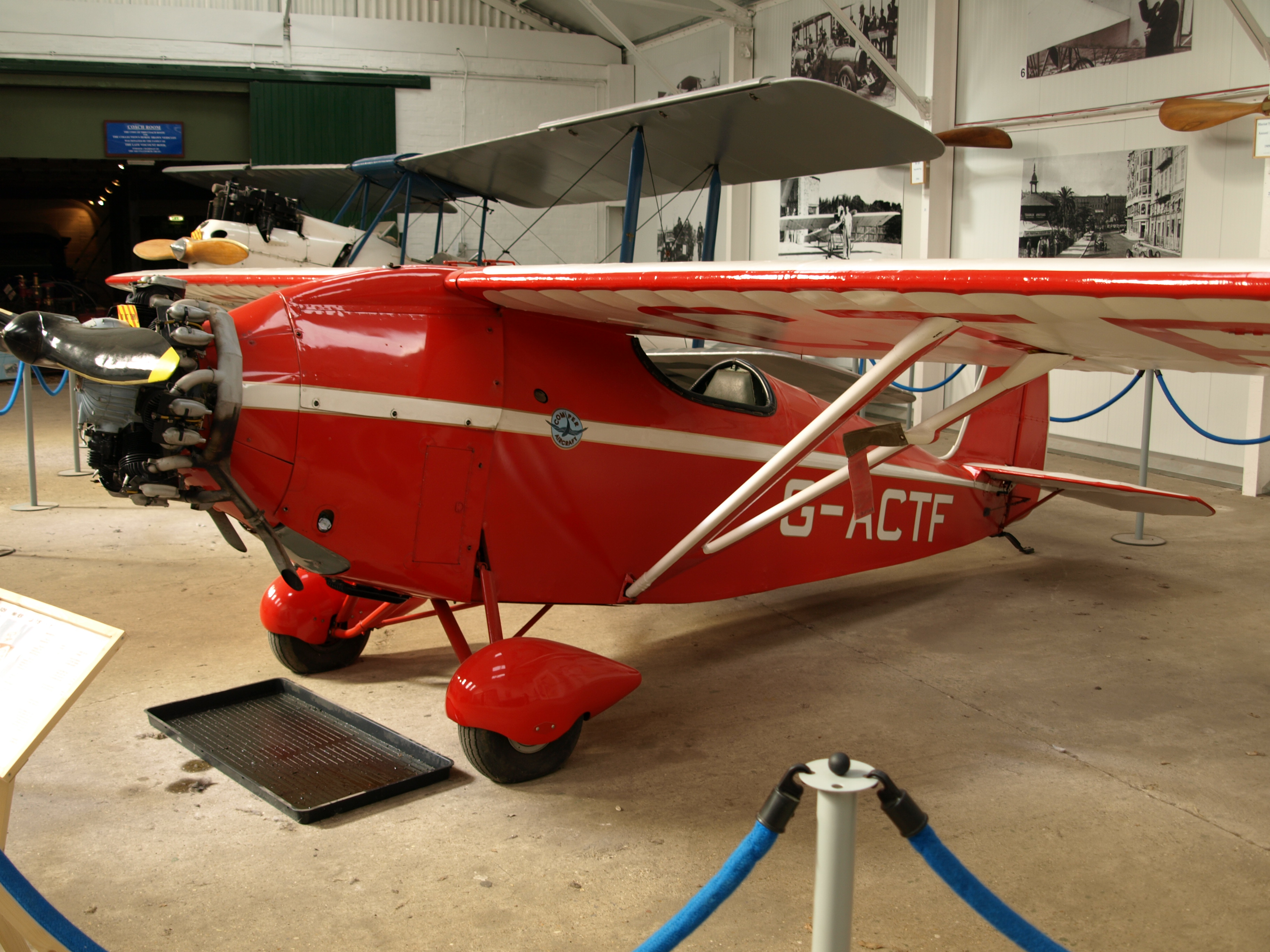
Comper Swift, G-ACTF.

- EC-HAM Airworthy, displayed at Cuatro Vientos, Madrid, Spain. Owned by Fundación Infante de Orleans. Formerly G-ABUU, now painted to represent "EC-AAT" "Ciudad de Manila" as flown by Fernando R. Loring for his March 1933 flight Madrid-Manila.
- G-ABTC Stored, in Cornwall.
- G-ABUS Stored, believed in France.
- G-ACGL On display, RAF Museum, Cosford.
- G-ACTF Airworthy, displayed at the Shuttleworth Collection, Old Warden, England
- G-LCGL Airworthy (replica)
- LV-FBA Stored, in Argentina. Also, a second Comper Swift flew in Argentina. Parts saved and stored in Buenos Aires after accident in San Justo 1950– Owner Vicente Bonvisutto (Reg.G-AAZE R-232 LV-YEA LV-FCE)
- VH-ACG (Gipsy engine) Airworthy This aircraft was shipped to Oshkosh, USA for the EAA Airventure fly-in, and will be shipped back to Australia after the show.
- VH-UVC Stored, in Sydney, Australia. - According to Classic Wings Magazine, VH-UVC took to the skies for the first time in 55 years on 20 November 2017 at Omaka Airfield, Blenheim, New Zealand.

A new-build aircraft, registered G-ECTF, and built according to the original plans, powered by a Pobjoy Cataract engine, flew for the first time on 2 October 2015.

== Operators ==
Spain

- Spanish Republican Air Force

United Kingdom

- Royal Air Force

== Specifications (C.L.A.7 Swift) ==
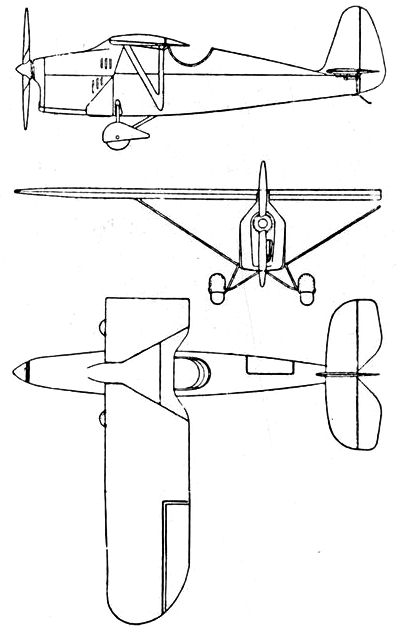
Comper Swift with Gipsy III engine 3-view drawing from L'Aerophile Salon 1932

Data from British Civil Aircraft since 1919 Volume 2, National Advisory Committee for Aeronautics

General characteristics

- Crew: 1
- Length: 17 ft 8.5 in (5.398 m)
- Wingspan: 24 ft 0 in (7.32 m)
- Height: 5 ft 3.5 in (1.613 m)
- Wing area: 90 sq ft (8.4 m^{2})
- Empty weight: 540 lb (245 kg)
- Gross weight: 985 lb (447 kg)
- Powerplant: 1 × Pobjoy R seven-cylinder air-cooled geared radial piston engine, 75 hp (56 kW)
- Propellers: 2-bladed fixed-pitch propeller

Performance

- Maximum speed: 140 mph (230 km/h, 120 kn)
- Range: 380 mi (610 km, 330 nmi)
- Service ceiling: 22,000 ft (6,700 m)

== See also ==
Related development

- Comper Mouse

Related lists

- List of aircraft of the Spanish Republican Air Force
