= RAE Scarab =

Scarab
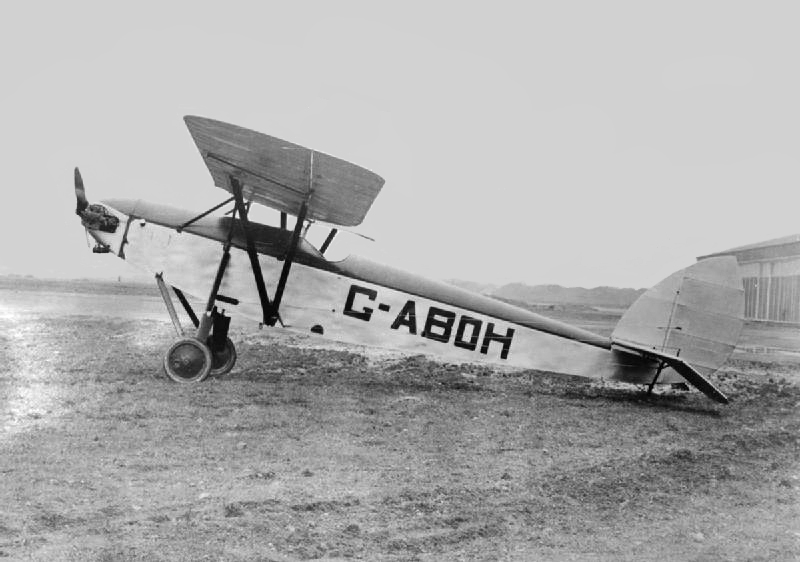

General information
- Type: Single-seat sports aircraft
- National origin: United Kingdom
- Manufacturer: Aero Club of the Royal Aircraft Establishment
- Designer: P G N Peters and C R Brewer
- Number built: 1

History
- First flight: February 1932
- Developed from: de Havilland Humming Bird

The RAE Scarab was a light single-engined single-seat parasol winged modification of the de Havilland Humming Bird, flying in the United Kingdom in 1932. Only one was built.

== Development ==
The Aero Club of the Royal Aircraft Establishment built two light aircraft in 1923, the Zephyr and the Hurricane, then no more until 1931. This, their final effort was the RAE Scarab or PB Scarab as it is sometimes known, after its designers P G N Peters and C R Brewer. Even so, it was not all their own work for the wing and empennage were from a low-winged DH.53, itself a 1923 aircraft. They repositioned the wing on a new fuselage to make a new, parasol winged monoplane, a change that required the creation of a centre section and the struts to support it.

With its new fuselage, the Scarab was longer than the DH.53, at 21 ft 0 in (6.40 m) compared with 19 ft 8 in (5.99 m). Most of the extra length was in the nose, for the DH.53 was a very snub-nosed machine compared with the Scarab. Both aircraft had flat sided fuselages built up from four longerons in the usual manner of the time, with rounded decking. The DH.53 pilot had sat over mid-chord, but the combination of 5^{o} of sweepback and the change of centre of gravity due to the longer nose in the Scarab meant he could sit at the trailing edge of the new, narrow chord centre section. Given the small gap between the top of the fuselage and the underside of the parasol wing, a mid chord cockpit would have been inaccessible and have restricted the pilot's view severely. A pair of lift stuts extended in a V from the lower fuselage longerons on each side to the two wing spars at the point where these were thickened for the compression struts of the DH.53. As on the DH.53, the wings had constant chord with slightly rounded tips, carrying long differential ailerons. In contrast to those of the DH.53, the wings of the Scarab folded for transport. The Scarab's undercarriage was also new, a split axle unit with the main legs going to the upper longerons and bracing to the lower ones. The undercarriage track was 5 ft (1.52 m). Like some DH.53s, the Scarab was powered by a 32 hp (24 kW) Bristol Cherub III flat twin.

The sole Scarab was registered as G-ABOH . Its first flight was in February 1932 with H.H. Leech at the controls. Though underpowered and slow, it seems to have flown nicely and had a surprising rate of climb. It flew from Farnborough until 1938, when it was stored and then scrapped in 1945.

== Specifications ==
Data from Flight 19 February 1932 p.149

General characteristics

- Crew: 1
- Length: 21 ft 0 in (6.40 m)
- Wingspan: 30 ft 0 in (9.14 m)
- Height: 6 ft 9 in (2.06 m)
- Wing area: 127 sq ft (11.8 m^{2}) swept
- Empty weight: 460 lb (209 kg)
- Gross weight: 650 lb (295 kg)
- Powerplant: 1 × Bristol Cherub III flat twin, 32 hp (24 kW) at 3,200 rpm

Performance

- Maximum speed: 78 mph (126 km/h, 68 kn)
- Cruise speed: 68 mph (109 km/h, 59 kn)
- Stall speed: 32 mph (51 km/h, 28 kn)
- Range: 200 mi (320 km, 170 nmi)
- Rate of climb: 600 ft/min (3.0 m/s)
