= RAF Cranwell =

Royal Air Force training station in Lincolnshire, England

RAF Cranwell
- Near Cranwell, Lincolnshire in England
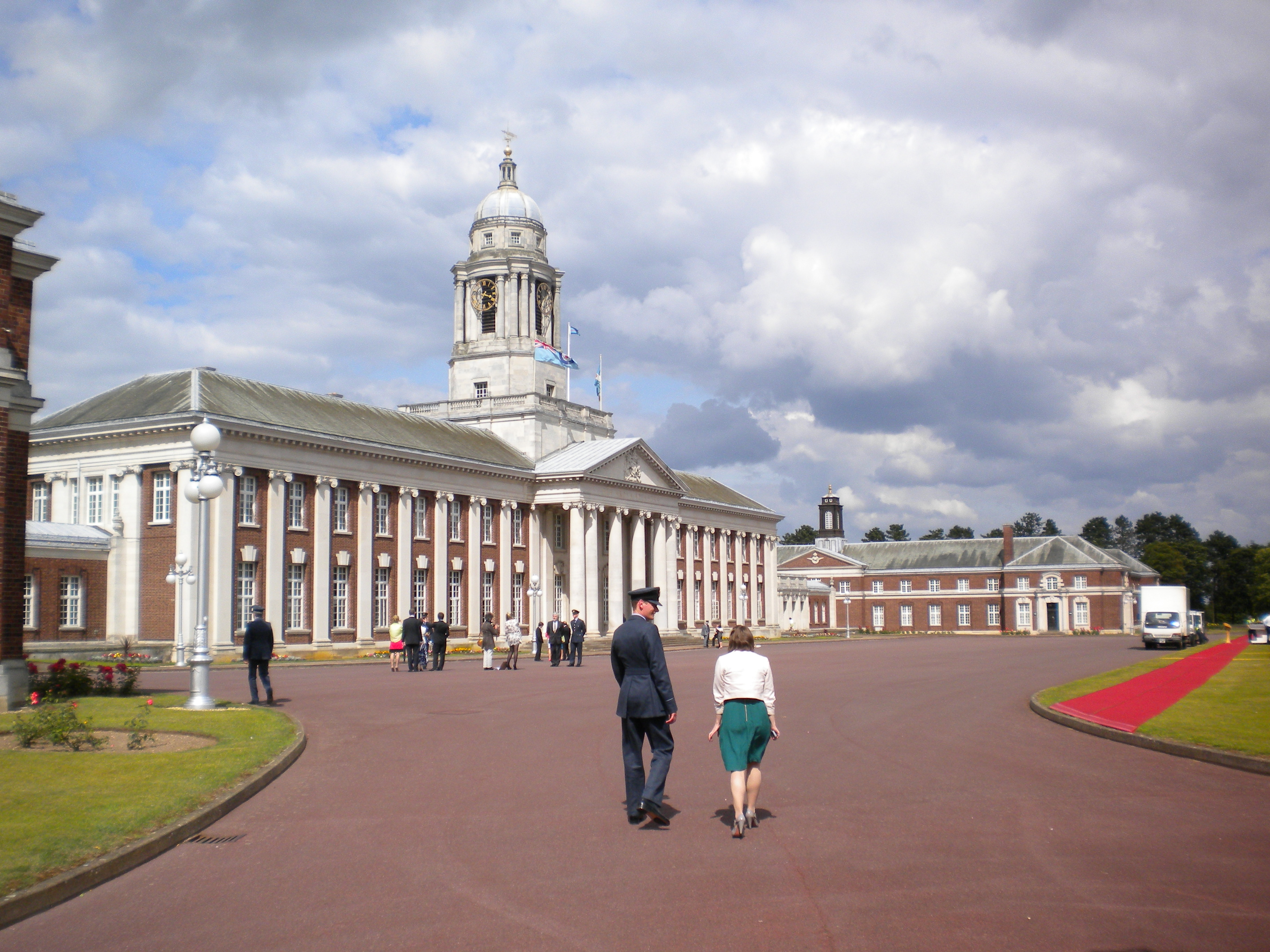
- College Hall at Royal Air Force College Cranwell

- Alitum Altrix (Latin for 'Nurture the Winged')

Site information
- Type: Training station
- Owner: Ministry of Defence
- Operator: Royal Air Force
- Controlled by: No. 22 Group (Training)
- Condition: Operational
- Website: Official website

Location
- Shown within Lincolnshire
- Coordinates: 53°01′49″N 000°29′00″W
- Area: 700 hectares (1,700 acres)

Site history
- Built: 1916
- In use: 1916–1918 (Royal Naval Air Service); 1918 – present (Royal Air Force)

Garrison information
- Current commander: Wing Commander Matthew "Chocka" Thornton
- Occupants: Royal Air Force Officer Training Academy; RAF College Cranwell; Central Flying School; HQ No. 3 Flying Training School; No. 45 Squadron; No. 57 Squadron; No. 703 Naval Air Squadron (operates from RAF Barkston Heath); HQ No. 6 Flying Training School; East Midlands Universities Air Squadron; No. 7 Air Experience Flight; See Based units section for full list.

Airfield information
- Identifiers: ICAO: EGYD, WMO: 03379
- Elevation: 67.7 metres (222 ft) AMSL
Runways
Direction	Length and surface
08/26	2,082 metres (6,831 ft) asphalt/concrete
01/19	1,462 metres (4,797 ft) asphalt/concrete
08N/26N	761 metres (2,497 ft) grass
08S/26S	761 metres (2,497 ft) grass
- Source: UK MIL AIP Cranwell

Royal Air Force Cranwell or more simply RAF Cranwell (ICAO: EGYD) is a Royal Air Force station in Lincolnshire, England, just west of the village of Cranwell, and approximately 4 miles (6.4 km) east-northeast from Sleaford. Among other functions, it is home to the Royal Air Force Officer Training Academy (RAFOTA), which trains the RAF's new officers and aircrew. The motto, Altium Altrix, meaning "Nurture the highest", appears above the main doors of the Officers' Mess. Since October 2026, RAF Cranwell has been commanded by Wing Commander Mel Copson.

== History ==
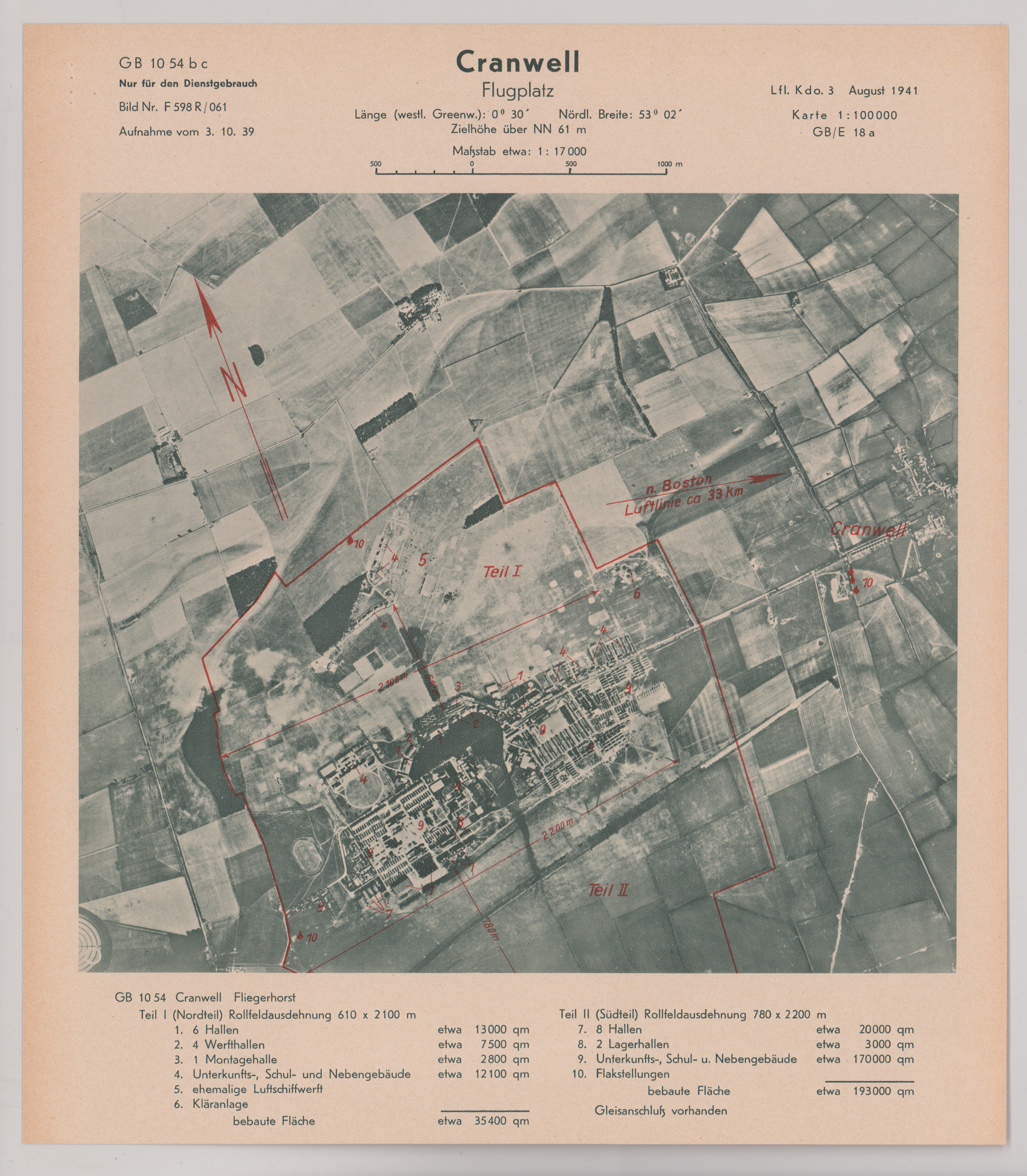
RAF Cranwell on a target dossier of the German Luftwaffe, 1941

The history of military aviation at Cranwell goes back to November 1915, when the Admiralty requisitioned 2,500 acres (10 km^{2}) of land from the Marquess of Bristol's estate. On 1 April 1916, the "Royal Naval Air Service Training Establishment, Cranwell" was officially born.

In 1917, a dedicated railway station was established for the RNAS establishment on a new single track branch line from Sleaford, the train being known as The Cranwell Flyer.

With the establishment of the Royal Air Force as an independent service in 1918, the RNAS Training Establishment became RAF Cranwell. The Royal Air Force College Cranwell was formed on 1 November 1919 as the RAF (Cadet) College.

== Role and operations ==
=== Royal Air Force College ===
Cranwell is home to the Royal Air Force College (RAFC), which oversees all RAF phase 1 Training. The RAF Officer Training Academy (RAFOTA) is the sub organisation of the RAFC which trains the RAFs new officers on a 24-week Modular Initial Officer Training Course (MIOTC), after which they are dispersed to their Phase II training for specific branch instruction. It is thus the RAF equivalent of the Royal Military Academy Sandhurst or the Britannia Royal Naval College.

=== RAF Recruitment ===
The station is home to the Officer and Aircrew Selection Centre (OASC), where all applicants to the RAF as officers or non-commissioned aircrew, are put through a rigorous selection process.

=== Headquarters Central Flying School ===
HQ CFS has been located at RAF Cranwell since 1995 when it moved from RAF Scampton. The Central Flying School currently trains all RAF QFI flying instructors.

=== No. 3 Flying Training School ===
Cranwell is home to the headquarters of No. 3 Flying Training School (No. 3 FTS). The school provides elementary flying training for fixed wing and multi-engine student pilots from the RAF and Fleet Air Arm through No. 57 (Reserve) Squadron and No. 703 Naval Air Squadron. The UK Military Flying Training System (UKMFTS) operates the Grob Prefect T1 in this role. Although nominally based at Cranwell, elementary training largely takes place at nearby RAF Barkston Heath. After elementary training, aircrews streamed to fly multi-engine aircraft and rear-seat roles are trained by No. 45(R) Squadron, which operate five Embraer Phenom 100.

On 16 January 2018, the Sykes Building was opened at Cranwell by Air Marshal Sean Reynolds, the Deputy Commander Capability and Senior Responsible Owner of the UKMFTS. The building acts as a UKMFTS operational support building and is used to train new RAF pilots. It was named after Air-Vice Marshal Sir Frederick Hugh Sykes, a British military officer and politician who served during the First World War.

=== Air Cadets ===
Since the mid-1990s, Cranwell has been home to Headquarters, Air Cadets, and the Air Cadet Organisation's Adult Training Facility.

== Based units ==
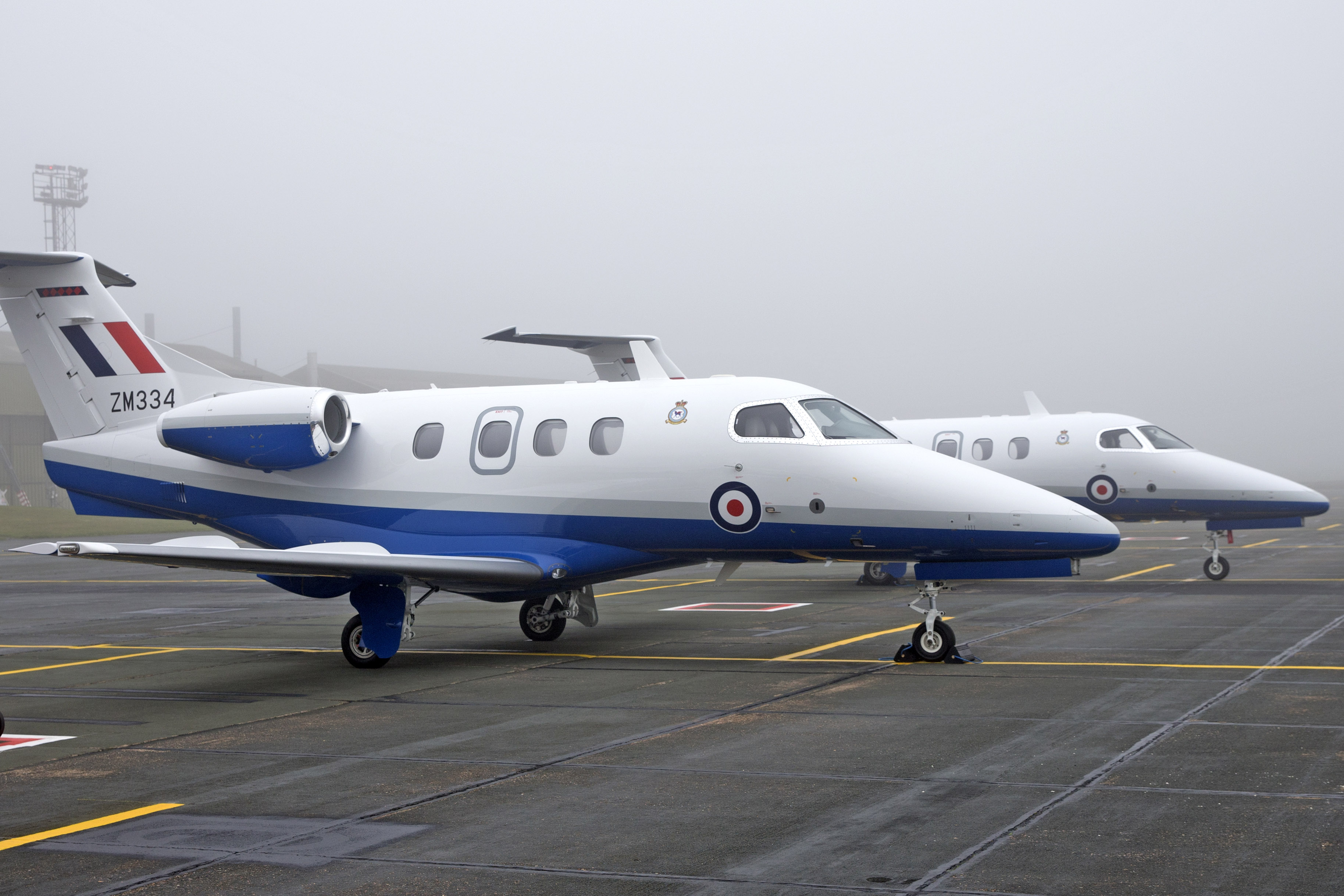
An Embraer Phenom 100, operated by No. 45 Squadron's based at RAF Cranwell

The following notable flying and non-flying units are based at RAF Cranwell.

=== Royal Air Force ===
No. 22 Group (Training) RAF

- RAF College Cranwell
  - RAF Officer Training Academy
  - Recruitment and Selection
  - Tedder Academy of Leadership
- Directorate of Flying Training
  - Central Flying School
    - Central Flying School Headquarters
  - No. 3 Flying Training School
    - No. 3 Flying Training School Headquarters
    - No. 45 Squadron – Embraer Phenom T1
    - No. 57 Squadron – Grob Prefect T1
  - No. 6 Flying Training School
    - No. 6 Flying Training School Headquarters
    - East Midlands Universities Air Squadron – Grob Tutor T1
    - No. 7 Air Experience Flight – Grob Tutor T1
- Robson Academy of Resilience
  - Robson Academy of Resilience Headquarters
  - Aircrew SERE Training Centre
  - Defence Aviation Human Factors Training School
  - Stress Management and Resilience Team
- RAF Air Cadets
  - RAF Air Cadets Headquarters

No. 2 Group (Air Combat Support) RAF

- Air Security Force
  - No. 1 RAF Police & Security Wing
    - Defence Serious Crime Unit
      - Defence Flying Complaints Investigation Team
      - Engagement Team
      - Serious Crime Flight (B Flight)
  - No. 2 RAF Police & Security Wing
    - No. 1 Tactical Police Squadron (No. 22 Group Security Squadron)
  - RAF Music Services
    - Band of the RAF College & the RAF Swing Wing (RAF College Cranwell)
    - The Band of the Royal Auxiliary Air Force

RAF Air and Space Warfare Centre

- Air Warfare School

Other RAF Units

- RAF Disclosures

=== Civilian ===
- RAF Cranwell Flying Club
- Cranwell Gliding Club

== Future ==
The RAF Centre of Aviation Medicine, which consists of three wings – Aviation Medicine Wing, Occupational and Environmental Medicine Wing, and Support Wing – will re-locate from RAF Henlow to RAF Cranwell by 2026. The equipment being relocated includes "aircraft cockpit rigs; hypobaric chambers, which simulate the effect of high altitude on the body; hypoxia training rigs; and helmet-testing gear".

The Recruit Training Squadron, which delivers the General Recruit Training Course (Phase 1) to all Royal Air Force Enlisted Aviator and Direct Entry SNCO recruits, is planned to relocate from RAF Halton, which is due to close in 2030 at the earliest, to RAF Cranwell.

== List of station commanders ==
Station commanders include:

- August 2 1954 Gp Capt Aeneas Ranald Donald MacDonell CB DFC, the 22nd chief of the Clan MacDonell of Glengarry
- August 16 1954, Gp Capt Douglas Joyce Eayrs CBE DFC (1908-92), he grew up in Manton, Rutland
- March 1968 – August 1970, Gp Capt David Craig, later Chief of the Air Staff
- February 1973, Gp Capt Stephen E King
- December 1974, Gp Capt (Max) Bacon
- January 1977, Gp Capt John Arthur Scambler
- March 1979, Gp Capt R H Wood
- May 20 1988, Gp Capt Ed Jarron, from Cupar in Scotland
- June 1990, Gp Capt John David Lunt
- February 1992, Gp Capt Peter Moore
- September 1994, Gp Capt Jake Jarron, brother of Ed Jarron
- May 2000, Gp Capt Graham Dixon
- January 17 2003, Gp Gapt Bruce Graham Benstead
- September 5 2005, Gp Capt M R Waring
- January 2023, Gp Capt Jessup
- January 2025, Wg Cdr Matthew Thornton
- October 2026 – present, Wg Cdr Mel Copson

== See also ==
- List of Royal Air Force stations
- Cranwell Light Aeroplane Club
- RAF Harlaxton – satellite airfield of Cranwell during the 1940s and 1950s
