= Haliburton Hume Leech =

Royal Air Force aviator (1908–1939)

- Born: 16 April 1908; Newcastle, England
- Died: 5 May 1939 (aged 31); London, England
- Military career
- Allegiance: United Kingdom
- Branch: Royal Air Force
- Service years: 1925–1937
- Rank: Flight Lieutenant

Flight Lieutenant Haliburton Hume Leech (16 April 1908 – 5 May 1939) was a Royal Air Force aviator, air racer and test pilot.

Leech was born on 16 April 1908 in Newcastle upon Tyne, Northumberland the son of Joseph William Leech a surgeon and later mayor and member of parliament for Newcastle upon Tyne.

Leech joined the Royal Air Force in 1925 as a cadet and on 10 April 1926 gained his Royal Aero Club Aviators Certificate (No. 7993) at the Newcastle upon Tyne Aero Club using a De Havilland Moth. Commissioned in 1927 he left the Royal Air Force College Cranwell and was posted to RAF Tangmere in 1927.

In 1930 he moved to the Royal Aircraft Establishment at Farnborough as a test pilot and he was selected for the High Speed Flight to compete in the Schneider Trophy Race, but after training with too many pilots being selected he returned to Farnborough without joining the team. He was a keen air racer and entered the King's Cup Race every year between 1929 and 1934, with his experience as a test pilot he performed the first flights of the RAE Scarab and the Arrow Active.

He married in 1937 in Eyke in Suffolk to Ruth Elliot. In September 1938 he retired from the Royal Air Force due to ill-health. Leech died on 5 May 1939 at St Bartholomews Hospital in London, aged 31.
