= Comper Kite =

Kite

General information
- Type: Touring aircraft
- National origin: United Kingdom
- Manufacturer: Comper Aircraft Company
- Designer: Nicholas Comper
- Number built: 1

History
- First flight: Summer 1934

The Comper Kite was a single-engined, two-seat touring monoplane built in the UK, derived from the contemporary Comper Streak racer. Only one was built.

== Design and development ==
The Kite was created by redesigning the single-seat Comper Streak racing aircraft as a two-seat tourer. The main changes, apart from the installation of the second cockpit by inserting an extra bay into the fuselage were the fitting of a more economical engine and the provision of extra tankage. Those things apart, only a few minor changes distinguished the two aircraft. The Kite, the last aircraft to be completed by the Comper Aircraft Company, was flying in early 1934, only a month after the Streak.

The wings almost identical to those of the Streak. They were built up around a pair of spruce and plywood box section spars, carrying three-ply and spruce ribs and skinned with stressed three-ply sheet. They were gently tapering in plan with rounded tips. There was 5° dihedral outboard, but none on the centre section. Mass balanced ailerons, narrower than those of the Streak filled more than half of the trailing edge. The mass balances were conspicuously mounted on extended upward arms from near the aileron root. The tailplane and split elevators were also of spruce and plywood, but fabric covered. The rounded fin and rudder, though fabric covered had a steel tube structure. The elevators and rudder were mass balanced, with external weights like those on the ailerons. The rudder extended to the bottom of the fuselage, operating in a cut-out between the elevators.

The rectangular cross-section fuselage consisted of four spruce Warren girders, fabric covered behind the engine. The pilot's cockpit was at the trailing edge of the wing and behind there was a deep, rounded fabric covered decking. Immediately in front of the pilot's cockpit was an extra fuselage bay containing the passenger's position, placed over the centre of gravity so that the trim would not be disturbed by their presence or absence. The fuel tanks of the Kite were in the wing roots, again to minimise changes in trim. The mounting for the Pobjoy Niagara engine, constructed of square section steel tube, started immediately in front of the passenger compartment. The 90 hp (67 kW) 7-cylinder radial engine was a development of the earlier Pobjoy R; two notable features were that it was very compact, with a diameter of only 26 in (660 mm) and that it was geared down with a gearbox that off-set the propeller shaft vertically. The result was a very neat cowling with Pobjoy's characteristic front ring and trade mark baffle. The exhaust exited from shallow individual cowls and scooped channels. The Pobjoy drove a two-bladed propeller.

The main wheels, which were provided with brakes, were mounted at the end of the wing centre section, each between pairs of compression legs. Pairs of cross braced struts, joining the legs a little way above the axle and hinged at top and bottom, rotated to retract the wheels rearwards. As on the Streak, the retracted wheels protruded to give some protection in a wheels up landing, but on the Kite there were small fairings ahead of them. At the rear there was a simple, sprung tailskid.

The Kite first flew, registered as G-ACME, early in the summer of 1934 and gained its Certificate of Airworthiness on 10 July. With the front cockpit faired over, it flew in the 1934 King's Cup Race at an average speed of 144 mph (232 km/h), but was eliminated in the heats. The Kite was never tried in the tourer role it was designed for, as Comper Aircraft ceased business in August 1934, taken over by the Heston Aircraft Company who had no interest in it. The Kite was broken up at Heston in 1935.

== Specifications ==
Data from Ord-Hume 2000, pp. 304

General characteristics

- Crew: 2
- Length: 19 ft 3 in (5.87 m)
- Wingspan: 23 ft 6 in (7.16 m)
- Height: 7 ft 0 in (2.13 m)
- Wing area: 80 sq ft (7.4 m^{2})
- Empty weight: 750 lb (340 kg)
- Gross weight: 1,350 lb (612 kg)
- Powerplant: 1 × Pobjoy Niagara 7-cylinder radial, 90 hp (67 kW) take-off maximum at 3,500 rpm

Performance

- Maximum speed: 155 mph (249 km/h, 135 kn)
- Cruise speed: 140 mph (230 km/h, 120 kn)
- Range: 700 mi (1,100 km, 610 nmi)

== Notes ==
=== Cited sources ===
- Jackson, A.J. (1973). British Civil Aircraft 1919-72. Vol. 2. London: Putnam Publishing. ISBN 978-0-85177-813-6.
- Ord-Hume, Arthur W.J.G. (2000). British Light Aeroplanes. Peterborough: GMS Enterprises. ISBN 978-1-870384-76-6.
- "Comper Streak". Flight. No. 19 April 1934. pp. 337–81.
- "Comper Kite". Flight. No. 10 May 1934. pp. 462–4.
