= RAF Hooton Park =

Former RAF base in Cheshire, England

RAF Hooton Park
- Wirral Peninsula, Cheshire in England
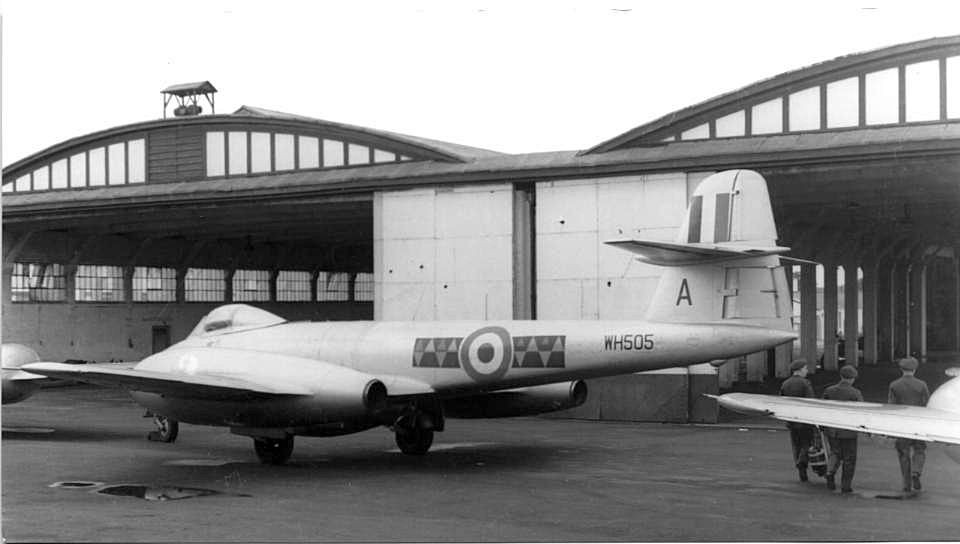
- Hangars at RAF Hooton Park in 1953

Site information
- Type: Royal Air Force Station
- Owner: Air Ministry
- Operator: Royal Air Force

Location
- Shown within Cheshire RAF Hooton Park (the United Kingdom)
- Coordinates: 53°18′11″N 02°56′34″W

Site history
- Built: 1917
- In use: 1917 - 1957
- Battles/wars: European theatre of World War II

Airfield information
- Elevation: 20 metres (66 ft) AMSL
Runways
Direction	Length and surface
03/21	970 metres (3,182 ft) Concrete
13/31	1,570 metres (5,151 ft) Concrete

Royal Air Force Hooton Park or more simply RAF Hooton Park, on the Wirral Peninsula, Cheshire, is a former Royal Air Force station originally built for the Royal Flying Corps in 1917 as a training aerodrome for pilots in the First World War. During the early/mid-1930s, it was one of the two airfields (with Liverpool Speke) handling scheduled services for the Merseyside region. Hooton Park was home to No. 610 (County of Chester) Squadron and, post Second World War, to No. 611 (West Lancashire) and No. 663 (AOP) Squadron.

The airfield closed in 1957 after the disbandment of the Royal Auxiliary Air Force, but the three pairs of Belfast Truss hangars erected in 1917 survived the closure. The site was bought by Vauxhall Motors, who built their Vauxhall Ellesmere Port plant there. This plant formerly produced the Vauxhall Astra, but Vauxhall owner Stellantis announced in 2024 that it would become the site for all Vauxhall van production in the UK. A small remaining section of the airfield site is now owned and managed by The Hooton Park Trust. The hangars are also home to The Griffin Trust and an aircraft preservation society named The Aeroplane Collection. Another part of the old airfield, including a length of the old paved runway, perimeter track and the apron used to park Meteor jet fighters, remains in the ownership of The Naylor Trust. A Second World War B1 hangar is also on this site.

== History ==
=== Site background ===
In 1070, William the Conqueror granted the lands of Hooton to Adam de Aldithly. Eventually they passed to the Stanley family through a series of marriages. After the Battle of Bosworth, Hooton had a new hall and the first Lord Derby in Lancashire. A second half-timbered hall was built in 1488.

A third, Italianate, hall was constructed circa 1778, but this later sold to cover the Stanley family's gambling debts in 1850. The hall and adjoining land was bought by a Mr. Naylor, a wealthy Liverpool banker, for 82,000 guineas. He spent a further 50,000 guineas on the addition of a 100-foot tower, an art gallery, and a large dining hall. He also built a racecourse, polo ground, heronry, stud farm and a church in Childer Thornton in memory of his first wife. His yacht was moored on the River Mersey, but in the 1890s the construction of the Manchester Ship Canal cut off his access to the river, so he moved to another of his properties in Nottinghamshire.

To avoid paying rates the hall was emptied of contents and staff, but the estate continued to be farmed and the racecourse and polo ground remained in use.

=== First World War ===
War was declared on 4 August 1914, and Hooton Park's racecourse was used for the last time some ten days later. The British War Department then requisitioned the estate for use as an army training ground. The hall became a headquarters, hospital, and officers' mess. Lord Derby recruited the first Pals regiments and Hooton became the training ground for the 18th Battalion of the Kings Liverpool Rifles. They left for France, and fought in the Battle of the Somme on 1 July 1916.

The War Department built one single and three double aircraft hangars, which were completed in 1917. These hangars had a unique latticed timber roof construction – Belfast Trusses – which were originally used in the Belfast shipyards to cover large working areas, and which provided strength at low cost.

Hooton Park then became the No. 4 Training Depot Station. The Royal Flying Corps moved in to form the fighter squadrons so badly needed in France, using Sopwith Scouts, Sopwith Dolphins and Avro 504s. Some of the pilots killed in training accidents were buried in the local churchyard at nearby Eastham. Large numbers of American and Canadian pilots were also trained at Hooton Park.

On 1 April 1918, the Royal Flying Corps merged with the Royal Naval Air Service to form the Royal Air Force. By the end of the First World War, the 37 aircraft on charge were moved to RAF Sealand and RAF Hooton Park was closed. During the following years the airfield reverted to farmland. The hangars were empty and the hall was so damaged by military use that it was sold as a redevelopment opportunity. and subsequently demolished (although the racecourse and polo ground remained).

=== Civil aviation between the Wars ===
The airfield site was purchased by Mr. G.H. Dawson, an aviation enthusiast. In the summer of 1927, the Liverpool Corporation held an air pageant at Hooton as part of its civic week. This show was such a success that the Liverpool and District Aero Club was formed. Dawson allowed the new club to use his aerodrome for a fee. After only twelve months the club became one of the most successful in the country, and along with Barton and Woodford Aerodromes was one of the centres for aviation in the north of England. For three years the aerodrome served as Merseyside's Airport.

Dawson persuaded two former RAF engineering officers to set up companies at Hooton: Nicholas Comper, whose Comper Aircraft Company designed and built the Comper Swift single-engined sporting monoplane; and Douglas Pobjoy, who designed and manufactured Pobjoy radial engines. Dawson ran into financial trouble, and died in 1933. In the same year, Liverpool Corporation opened Speke airfield across the Mersey as its permanent airport. The flying club subsequently moved there for cheaper hangarage and clubhouse facilities. In March 1933, Comper moved his company to Heston Aerodrome.

In 1934, William Fettis 'Frank' Davison (1899–1949), and his pilot-engineer wife Elsie Joy Muntz (1910–1940) bought Hooton Aerodrome. They set up their own company at Hooton, Utility Airways, which offered joy-riding, air-taxis and some short-distance scheduled flights. When WW2 came, the airfield was returned to military use and all of Davison's aircraft were stored under the old Hooton racecourse grandstand where they, along with several others, to a total of 19 aircraft, were destroyed by an accidental fire, often referred to as the "Great Fire of Hooton Park". on 8 July 1940.

Pobjoy went to work for Short Brothers at Rochester, Kent, but was killed in a mid-air collision in 1946. Despite these setbacks, Hooton was still an important aerodrome, with many private owners and several small airlines continuing to operate out of it.

=== Second World War ===
In 1935, Martin Hearn, an ex-pilot and -ground engineer and who had previously worked for Alan Cobham's Flying Circus as a wing walker and aerial trapeze artist, created Martin Hearn Ltd., employing a few mechanics to service the aircraft using the aerodrome. In 1936, No. 610 (County of Chester) Squadron Auxiliary Air Force was formed at Hooton Park. Most of the pilots took private flying lessons to qualify. One person said, "Never have I seen so many Rolls-Royce cars in one spot at the same time" – an indication of the pilots' typical social status. The unit was initially a bomber squadron equipped with Hawker Hind and Hawker Hart bombers and Avro Tutor trainers.

In 1939, the squadron took charge of a number of Fairey Battles, then a flight of Hawker Hurricanes that were quickly replaced by Supermarine Spitfire I's. At the outbreak of the Second World War on 3 September 1939, the Squadron was mobilised and sent to RAF Wittering. 610 later moved to RAF Biggin Hill, where it took part in the Battle of Britain, becoming one of the most successful fighter squadrons to take part in that action. By the end of the war 610 Squadron had destroyed 132 enemy aircraft and 50 flying bombs. One of its pilots (Sgt. Ray Hamlyn) accounted for five enemy aircraft in one day. In February 1945, another 610 pilot (F/Lt Tony Gaze) flying a Spitfire XIV destroyed a Messerschmitt Me 262 jet fighter-bomber over Germany.

At this time, Martin Hearn obtained a contract from the Ministry of Aircraft Production to repair large numbers of Avro Ansons, and later de Havilland Mosquito fighter-bombers. As No. 7 Aircraft Assembly Unit, the company's work also included the assembly of various types of US-built aircraft that arrived by ship at the Mersey docks. Aircraft included the North American Mustang, Lockheed P-38 Lightning and Republic P-47 Thunderbolt fighters, plus Douglas Boston and Canadian-built Handley Page Hampden bombers, and North American Harvard trainers.

The first Sikorsky helicopters used by the RAF were also assembled and tested at Hooton towards the end of the war. During the war years, Hooton assembled and repaired thousands of aircraft. The RAF operated a flight of Coastal Command Avro Ansons, de Havilland Tiger Moths and de Havilland Hornet Moths on anti-submarine patrols during 1939 and 1940. No. 11 Radio School and No. 1 School of General Reconnaissance flew from the airfield.

In 1941, the grass airfield was transformed to include a 6,000-foot concrete runway – one of the longest in Europe at that time. As aircraft became redundant, they were sent from all over the country to No. 100 Sub Storage Site at Hooton to be scrapped. The end of the Second World War brought a decline in work to Martin Hearn. The company then had to seek peacetime work. To this end, buses were repaired, armoured cars overhauled and around 70 gliders were built under contract to Slingsby.

=== Post-war operations ===
In 1947, Martin Hearn Ltd was renamed Aero-Engineering and Marine (Merseyside), and Martin Hearn was no longer connected to it. Martin Hearn went into partnership with Lily Belcher, and ran the Glider Club, adjacent to the airfield at its north western corner, as a successful and popular hotel for 25 years. The engineering company survived until 1955, latterly servicing Canadair Sabre jet fighters for the RAF and RCAF. Wing Commander 'Wilbur' Wright opened a flying school at Hooton, and later a gliding club was operated from the northern end of the airfield. The gliding club survived as a local wining and dining venue until 1986.

In 1946, No. 610 Squadron Royal Auxiliary Air Force returned to Hooton Park after valiant war service, flying Spitfires in the European theatre. No. 663 (AOP) Squadron was reformed at Hooton Park in 1949, using Auster spotting aircraft. In 1951, No. 610 Squadron received Meteor twin jet fighters, and No. 611 Squadron (West Lancashire) relocated from Woodvale to use the longer Hooton runway required for this type of aircraft. The three squadrons operated as R.Aux.AF units from the airfield until all Auxiliary flying squadrons were disbanded in March 1957. At this point, the station was closed and all flying ceased at RAF Hooton Park.

== Units ==
The following units were also here at some point:

- No. 13 Squadron RAF
- No. 48 Squadron RAF
- No. 117 Squadron RAF
- No. 206 Squadron RAF
- No. 502 (Ulster) Squadron AAF
- 701 Naval Air Squadron
- 825 Naval Air Squadron
- 43rd Aero Squadron
- 185th Aero Squadron

Units

- No. 3 Coastal Patrol Flight RAF (December 1939 – May 1940)
- No. 3 Radio Direction Finding School RAF (December 1942)
- No. 4 Coastal Patrol Flight RAF (December 1939 – May 1940)
- No. 4 Training Squadron RAF (March – May 1919)
- Relief Landing Ground for No. 5 Service Flying Training School RAF
- No. 15 Group Communication Flight RAF (February 1941 – December 1942)
- No. 19 Reserve Flying School RAF (July 1950 – July 1951)
- Sub site of No. 48 Maintenance Unit RAF (November 1944 – October 1946)
- Sub site of No. 61 Maintenance Unit RAF (November 1944 – ?)
- No. 186 Gliding School RAF (March 1947 – March 1948)
- No. 192 Gliding School RAF (June 1945 – May 1946 & October 1947 & March 1948 – June 1949)
- No. 1447 Flight RAF (March – December 1942)
- No. 1953 Reserve Air Observation Post Flight RAF (July 1949 – March 1957)
- No. 1955 Reserve Air Observation Post Flight RAF (July 1949 – March 1957)
- Liverpool University Air Squadron (December 1950 – July 1951)
- The Temperature and Humidity (THUM) Flight RAF (May – July 1951)

== After closure by the RAF ==
The closure of the aerodrome was not the end of the story for Hooton Park – it became the site of the north's biggest agricultural show (the Cheshire Show) until 1977, and the runways continued to be used by Shell Research for testing cars at high speed. In 1960 part of the site was purchased by Vauxhall Motors for the construction of a vehicle production plant at Ellesmere Port – the first car to roll off the production line being the Vauxhall Viva.

== Hooton Park Trust ==
In the summer of 1986 Hooton opened its gates for two days to host the 'Wheels 86 Transport Extravaganza'. Four other Wheels shows (1988, 1992, 1994 and 1996) were held following the success of that inaugural event. Over 80,000 people attended these events, and many thousands of pounds were donated to charities from the proceeds. The runways were used for the first time since 1957. Harrier jets were flown at the site to demonstrate aviation technology at this aviation site.

Early in the 1980s, the group of four people organising these events successfully approached the local authority to obtain a preservation order on the three historic World War I hangars. English Heritage bestowed on the three hangars grade II Listed building status in 1985 because of their rarity as a group of three double-bay hangars utilising the Belfast truss form of construction.

In the late 1980s this group of four formed themselves into an alliance called The Griffin Trust, and Vauxhall Motors granted them a peppercorn lease on two of the hangars. The third hangar continued to be used to service Vauxhall motor cars.

After a great deal of work, the buildings were brought into some semblance of order. Despite many attempts to raise capital for the repair and maintenance of the buildings The Griffin Trust failed to secure any substantial grant funding.

On 9 October 2000, The Hooton Park Trust obtained the freehold of the three World War I aircraft hangars, with associated ancillary accommodation and land at Hooton Park. The sale of the freehold concluded twelve months of intensive negotiations between The Hooton Park Trust and Vauxhall Motors. These were entered into in response to Vauxhall Motor's application in September 1998 to the local planning authority (Ellesmere Port and Neston Borough Council), for Listed Building Consent to demolish the hangars. This created an enormous protest from aircraft enthusiasts and local people, who were determined that the buildings should be saved in recognition of their role in the development of military and civilian aviation. The campaign was also supported by people concerned with the architectural value contained within the site's buildings.

Vauxhall Motors and their parent company General Motors, met with representatives of The Hooton Park Trust. The Trust persuaded the car giant of the value of the heritage asset they owned, and as a gesture in recognition of this the freehold was passed to The Hooton Park Trust. The motor giant provided substantial financial support to supplement planned applications for public sector funding as well as support expenses to aid the Trust in the first three years of operation.

English Heritage commissioned a thematic review of military aviation sites throughout the United Kingdom in 1998. In that review, Hooton Park was recommended for upgrade to grade II* (two star) listing. Belfast truss hangars were now exceedingly rare, and Hooton Park was in the fortunate position of having three double bay examples set in context with their original ancillary buildings.

In March 2003, grade II* (two star) listing was achieved and a scheme of emergency repairs was devised by consultant engineers working on behalf of the buildings owner's. The Hooton Park Trust have secured initial grants from English Heritage, Heritage Lottery Fund and WREN (landfill tax credits), and work was due to begin on restoring the hangars and ancillary accommodation in September 2007. Since that date, there has been a major roof collapse in one of the hangars, potentially endangering its future. Parts of the site remain open to the public, and the Trust offers guided tours to groups and individuals interested in Hooton Park's rich architectural and aviation history.

In 2022 The Hooton Park Trust re-launched its series of monthly public open days, having completed extensive restoration works in its hangar B16 South. The hangar is now home to TAC, the Chester No 4 Tram restoration project and houses an impressive collection of vintage aircraft and period bicycles and vehicles. The hangar is also home to the CH 21 Home Guard WW II Living History Group, who host a NAAFI style cafe and stage events for the public telling the story of the hangars during WW II

== Surviving airfield facilities ==
A section of the main runway, together with a taxi track and apron, survives at the western end of the airfield owned by the Naylor Trust. A private Eurostar light aircraft landed on and later departed from this runway in 2011. The adjacent large World War II B1 type hangar, which was last used for servicing Meteor jet fighters, is now in industrial use.

=== Kart circuit ===
In January 2007, the Hooton Park kart circuit opened after 12 months of construction. The circuit is officially licensed by the Motor Sports Association and race meetings are held on the second Sunday of each month. The races are organised by the Cheshire Kart Racing Club.

Since its opening, the circuit has proven to be popular to karters in the North West Region and has played host to several major meetings including the last round of the Motors TV UK Karting Challenge in October 2007. The Circuit is due to host the NKRA Grande Finals in August 2009.

== The Aeroplane Collection (TAC) ==
TAC is generally regarded as the first voluntary aircraft preservation group in England, having been formed as the Northern Aircraft Preservation Society in 1962. Renamed in 1974 as The Aeroplane Collection, it has been based at Hooton Park for quite some time. It occupies two of the three 1916 era Belfast truss hangars on the site, and several aircraft are being stored and restored to display condition.

Aircraft owned by the group are on display at Hooton Park alongside several owned by the Hooton Park Trust, under the name 'Hooton Park Hangars', unless they are stored or under restoration. As of June 2026 the collection consists of:

- Auster J.1N Alpha G-AJEB
- Avro 594 Avian G-EBZM †
- Bensen B-7M (modified) G-APUD †
- Comper Swift G-ACGL on loan from RAF Museum Midlands
- de Havilland DH.89A Dragon Rapide G-ADAH †
- de Havilland DH.115 Vampire T.11 XD624 undergoing restoration
- de Havilland Canada DHC-1 Chipmunk 22 WB730/G-AOUO
- de Havilland Canada DHC-1 Chipmunk T.10 WD387/G-BDDD cockpit, stored
- de Havilland Canada DHC-1 Chipmunk T.10 WG303 stored
- de Havilland Canada DHC-1 Chipmunk T.10 WK640/G-BWUV cockpit, stored
- Fairey Gannet T.2 BAPC.309 forward upper section including 2 cockpits
- McBroom Hang Glider BAPC.204 stored
- Mignet HM.14 Pou du Ciel BAPC.12 marked as "G-ADYO" †
- Miles Gemini Mk.1A G-AKDK arrived in November 2025
- Miles Gemini Mk.1A G-AKEN arrived in 2024
- Miles Gemini Mk.1A G-AKHZ stored
- Miles Messenger Mk.2A G-AHUI undergoing restoration.
- Miles Wing Gulp 100a hang glider BAPC.310 stored
- Parker CA.4 Parasol (Luton Minor) G-AFIU undergoing restoration.
- Percival Proctor IV RM169/G-ANVY restoration project arrived Summer 2024
- Roe I Triplane static replica BAPC.6 on indefinite loan from the Shuttleworth Collection †
- Sikorsky R-4B Hoverfly 1 KL110, the oldest military helicopter in the UK, assembled by Martin Hearn in February 1945, on loan from RAF Museum Hendon, marked as "KK995"
- Slingsby T.8 Tutor glider G-ALPU/BGA473, originally built by Martin Hearn, stored pending restoration.
- Supermarine Spitfire PRXIX PM651 arrived in March 2026 on loan from the RAF Museum

† – These aircraft were displayed at the Science and Industry Museum in Manchester for many years, but were moved to Hooton Park over the winter of 2021–2.

== Ellesmere Port Model Boat Club ==
In 2017 Ellesmere Port Model Boat Club were given a small piece of land on which to build a sailing lake. The club was given this on the proviso the land be tended to and looked after by the members. In 2018 trees were cut back, grass mown and rubbish removed. A small pool was then built on the land. This pool also acts as an emergency water supply in case of fire. The club are hoping to remain at Hooton for the foreseeable future.

== CH 21 Home Guard Living History Group ==
CH 21 are a reincarnation of the Eastham & Bromborough Home Guard who were active during WW II until stood down in 1944. The duties of CH 21 were in part to patrol the perimeters of the RAF base. The group are now permanently stationed at Hooton Park as a residents.

== See also ==
- List of former Royal Air Force stations
- Listed buildings in Hooton, Cheshire
- Nick Comper
