= Bristol Cherub =

1920s British piston aircraft engine

Cherub
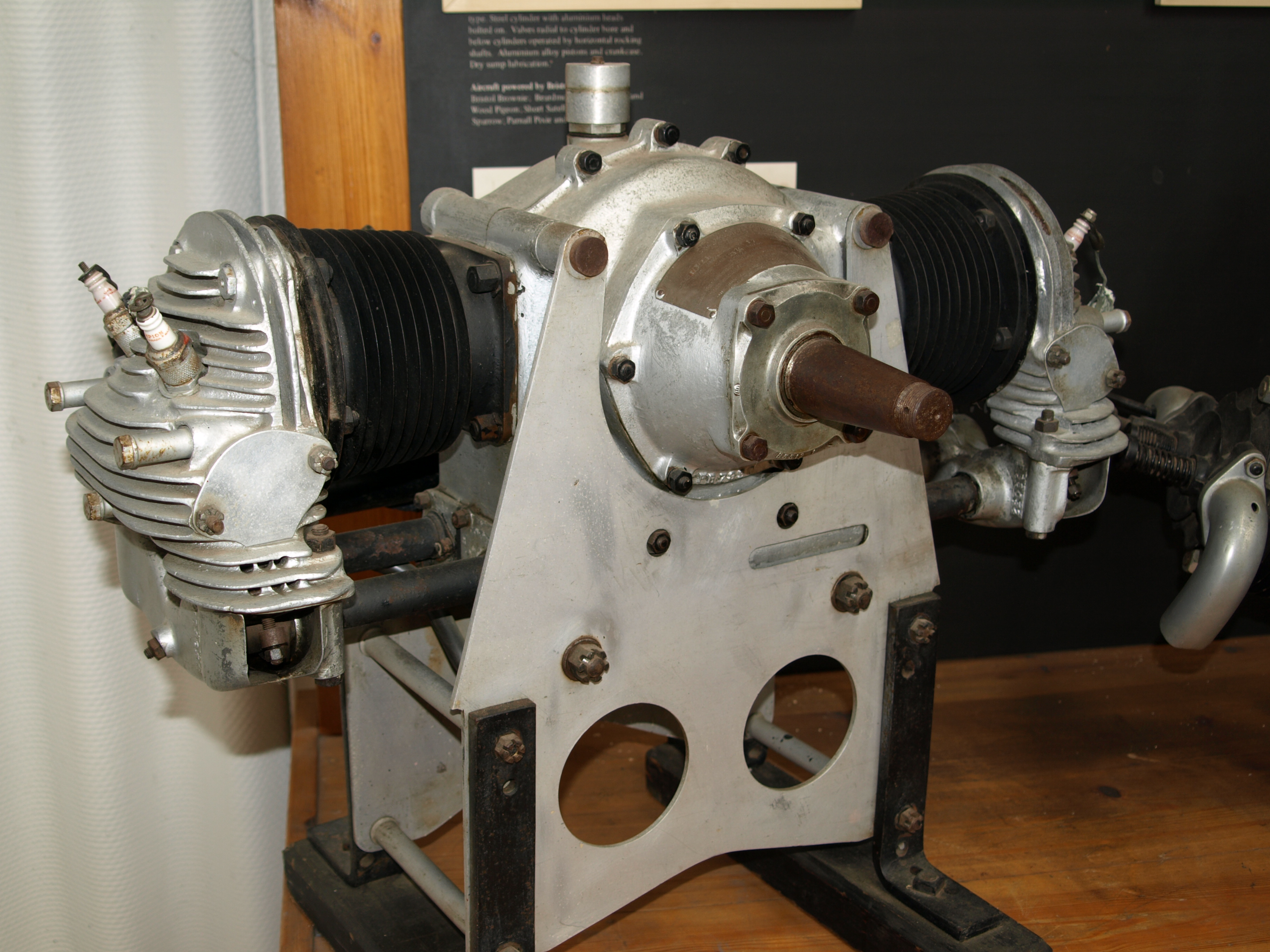
- Preserved Bristol Cherub engine
- Type: Piston aircraft engine
- Manufacturer: Bristol Aeroplane Company
- First run: 1923
- Major applications: Bristol Brownie; Hawker Cygnet

The Bristol Cherub is a British two-cylinder, air-cooled, aircraft engine designed and built by the Bristol Aeroplane Company. Introduced in 1923 it was a popular engine for ultralight and small aircraft in the 1930s.

== Variants ==
Cherub I
Initial direct drive version introduced in 1923. Bore and stroke of 3.35 by 3.8 inches (85 mm × 97 mm) for a displacement of 67 cu in (1.095 L). 32 horsepower (24 kW) at 2,500 rpm.
Cherub II
Geared down (2:1) version of the Cherub I.
Cherub III
An improved and slightly larger (1.228 L) direct drive version introduced in 1925.

== Applications ==
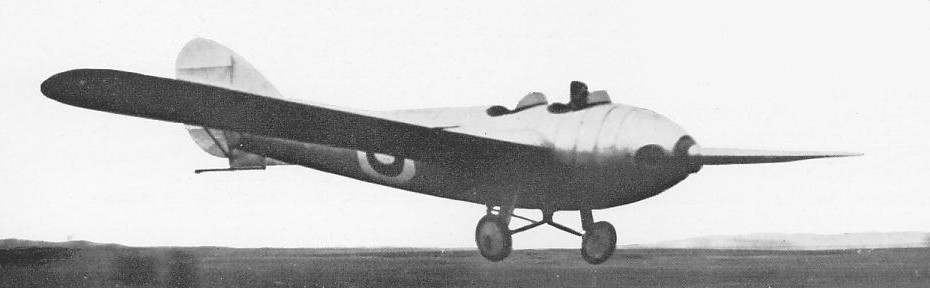
Cherub-powered Short Satellite

- Avia BH-2
- Avro Avis
- Beardmore Wee Bee
- Bristol Brownie
- Cranwell CLA.2
- Cranwell CLA.3
- Cranwell CLA.4
- Dart Pup
- Everson Evo III
- Granger Archaeopteryx
- Halton Mayfly
- Halton Minus
- Hawker Cygnet
- Johnson Twin 60
- Lippisch Delta 1
- Messerschmitt M17
- Meyers Midget
- Mignet HM.14 Pou-du-Ciel
- Parnall Pixie
- Pander DB two Pices
- Powell Racer
- RAE Scarab
- RAE Hurricane
- Short Cockle
- Short Satellite
- Stout Amphibian
- Supermarine Sparrow
- Vickers Vagabond
- Westland Woodpigeon
- Westland-Hill Pterodactyl

== Survivors ==
An airworthy Messerschmitt M17 replica is owned and operated by the EADS Heritage Flight at Manching and is powered by an original Bristol Cherub III.

== Engines on display ==
A preserved Bristol Cherub is on static display at the Shuttleworth Collection, Old Warden, Bedfordshire.

== Specifications (Cherub III) ==
Data from Lumsden.

=== General characteristics ===
- Type: 2-cylinder air-cooled, horizontally opposed, left-hand tractor
- Bore: 3.54 in (90 mm)
- Stroke: 3.8 in (96.5 mm)
- Displacement: 75 in³ (1.228 L)
- Width: 25.6 in (650 mm)
- Dry weight: 98 lb (39.5 kg)

=== Components ===
- Valvetrain: Overhead valve
- Oil system: Dry sump
- Cooling system: Air-cooled

=== Performance ===
- Power output: 36 hp (24 kW) at 3,200 rpm
- Compression ratio: 5.75:1
- Fuel consumption: 2.5 imp. gallons per hour
- Power-to-weight ratio: 0.36 hp/lb

== See also ==
Comparable engines

- ABC Scorpion
- Aeronca E-113
- Armstrong Siddeley Ounce
- Walter Atom

Related lists

- List of aircraft engines
