= Nicholas Comper =

British aircraft designer

- Born: 29 April 1897; Lambeth, London
- Died: 17 June 1939 (aged 42); Hythe, Kent
- Education: Dulwich College
- Known for: designing light aircraft, notably the Comper Swift
- Father: Sir John Ninian Comper
- Aviation career
- First flight: 1915

Racing career
- Aircraft: Comper Swift

Nicholas Comper (29 April 1897 – 17 June 1939) was an English aviator and aircraft designer, whose most notable success was the 1930s Comper Swift monoplane racer.

== Early life ==
Nicholas Comper was born in Lambeth, London, England, the son of church architect Sir John Ninian Comper. After leaving Dulwich College, he joined the Aircraft Manufacturing Company (Airco) as an apprentice. He left the company in 1915 to join the Royal Flying Corps, and was trained to fly at Castle Bromwich Aerodrome. He joined No. 9 Squadron RFC, and was posted to Morlancourt in France, flying B.E.2c aircraft on reconnaissance missions.

After World War I, Comper stayed in what was then the Royal Air Force, and in 1920 he studied aerodynamics at Jesus College, Cambridge. He spent time with RAE Farnborough, and in October 1922 he was posted to RAF Cranwell to train engineering officers. One of his pupils was Frank Whittle, the jet engine pioneer.

In 1923, Comper and some of his pupils and other members of staff formed the Cranwell Light Aeroplane Club. The Club went on to build four aircraft designed by Comper, named Cranwell C.L.A.2, C.L.A.3, and two examples of the C.L.A.4A. In late 1926 he was posted to the Marine Aircraft Experimental Establishment (MAEE) Felixstowe to work on flying boats and seaplanes. In March 1929, having reached the rank of Flight Lieutenant, he resigned his commission to pursue aircraft design ambitions.

== Civilian life ==
In April 1929, he formed the Comper Aircraft Company Ltd, based at Hooton Park Aerodrome near Ellesmere Port in Cheshire. His first design to be built at Hooton was his most successful, the Comper Swift, a single-seat sporting monoplane. In March 1933, the company moved to Heston Aerodrome near London. The company ceased trading in August 1934.

In August 1934, Comper joined with Francis R Walker to form a design consultancy named Comper and Walker Ltd, based in central London. He worked on airliner projects he called Dominion and Commerce. In December 1936, he renamed the company Comper Aeroplanes Limited, to develop those concepts. In 1938, working from his home in Walton-on-Thames, Comper designed a new training aircraft named the Comper Scamp. The single-seat trial version named the CF.1 Fly was built by students at the Chelsea College of Aeronautical Engineering at Brooklands Aerodrome.

On 17 June 1939, in Hythe, Kent, Comper was fatally injured in unusual circumstances. He had been a practical joker, and after he was stopped lighting fireworks in a public house, he went outside. As he bent down to light the firework, a passer-by enquired what he was doing, his reply was that he was an IRA man and was going to blow up the town hall, prompting the passer-by to knock him down. Comper hit his head on the kerb, suffered a cerebral haemorrhage and died later in hospital, aged 42.

After Comper's death, the Comper CF.1 Fly was completed with RAF serial T1788 by Heston Aircraft Company, who failed to make it fly with the available engine power. Comper's collaborator on the CF.1 project, Gerard Fane, later developed the concept into a newly designed air observation post (AOP) aircraft, the Fane F.1/40.

== Aircraft designed and flown ==
- 1924 – Cranwell CLA.2
- 1925 – Cranwell CLA.3
- 1926 – Cranwell CLA.4
- 1930 – Comper Swift
- 1932 – Cierva C.25
- 1933 – Comper Mouse
- 1934 – Comper Streak
- 1934 – Comper Kite
