= Cranwell CLA.3 =

CLA.3
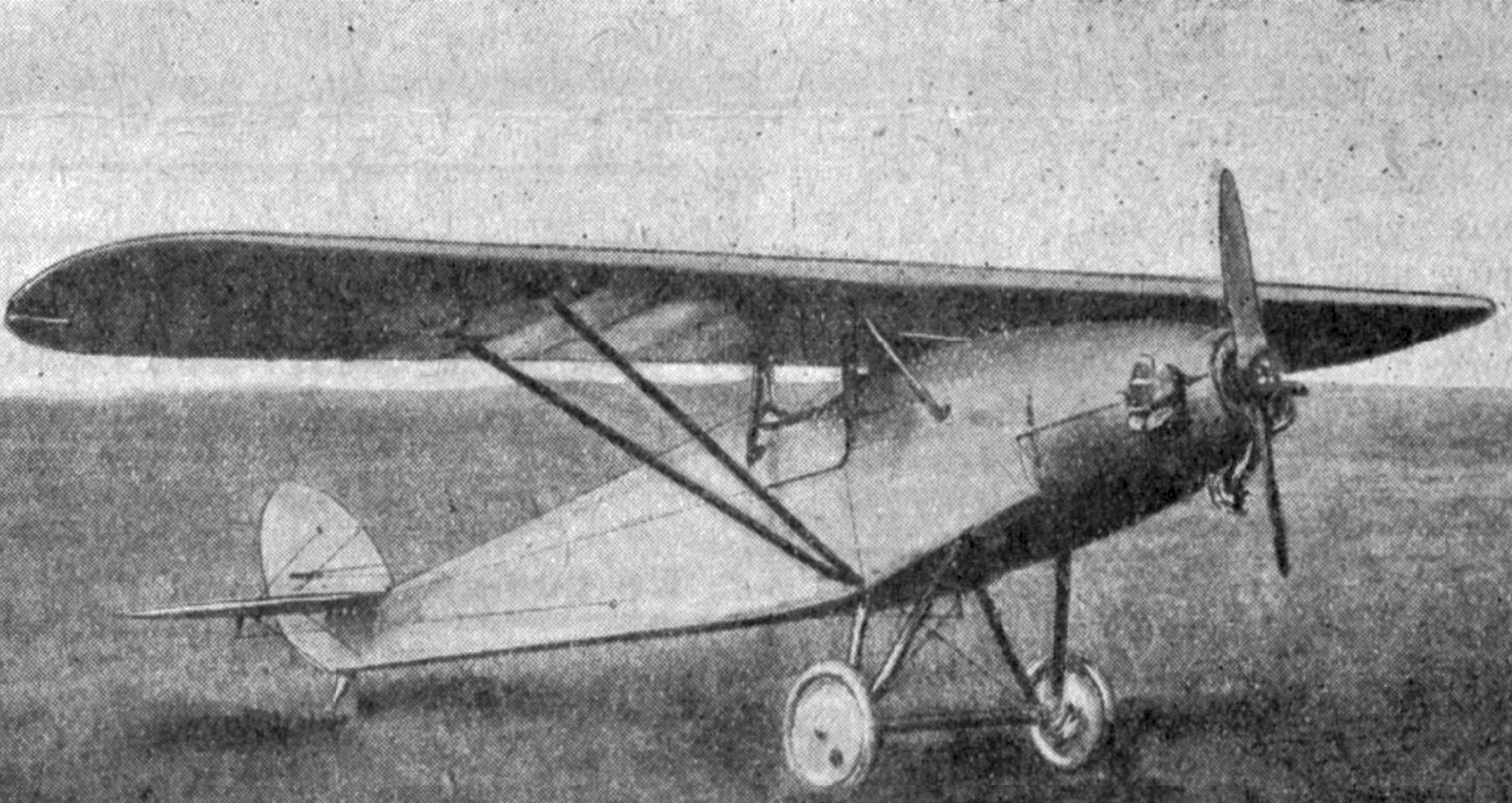

General information
- Type: Racing aircraft
- National origin: United Kingdom
- Manufacturer: The Cranwell Light Aeroplane club
- Designer: Nicholas Comper
- Number built: 1

History
- First flight: mid- July 1925
- Retired: 1929

The Cranwell CLA.3 was a parasol winged single-engined, single-seat British aircraft built to compete in the Lympne air races of 1925. It was designed and built by an amateur group drawn from staff and pupils at the RAF College Cranwell. Though it won one prize and set a Class record, only one CLA.3 was made.

== Design and development ==
The Cranwell Light Aeroplane (CLA) club was formed in 1923 by staff and students at the RAF College Cranwell. The students came from No.4 Apprentices Wing and one of their lecturers, Flt-Lt Nicholas Comper became chief designer of the three aircraft produced by the club as well as one, the CLA.1 that was not completed. Their first finished aircraft, the CLA.2 won a £300 prize at the Lympne trials in 1924, but was a rather slow biplane, and Comper decided to design something much quicker for the 1925 Lympne event. The result was the CLA.3, a single-engined parasol winged single seater.

The wings of the CLA.3 were straight and had constant chord apart from at the rounded tips. The airfoil section used, the Eiffel 371 was something of a novelty, a thick wing with a quite flat bottom. The wings were built on two I-section spruce spars and fabric covered everywhere apart from at the leading edge, where thin aluminium was used. Differential ailerons were fitted; initially the gap between aileron and wing was filled with narrow rubber flaps, but later they were removed as they added weight and made lateral control heavy. The wings were held about 7 in (180 mm) above the fuselage, parasol fashion, by two steel lift struts on each side which ran from a common point on the lower longeron of the fuselage to the front and rear spars at mid-span. Three vertical steel cabane struts on each side joined the centre section to the upper longerons.

The rear part of the fuselage was a Warren girder based on four longerons, tapering towards the tail. The fuselage cross section was kept to a minimum to reduce drag and to this end the pilot sat on the cockpit floor. There were concerns about ease of escape from this position under the rear wing spar, but it was after all, a racing machine. In front of him the structure was wire braced, the longerons converging to become overhung engine bearers. The 32 hp (24 kW) Bristol Cherub II engine was mounted on a plate with a fireproof bulkhead, within a long, smooth aluminium cowling blended into the spinner of the two-bladed propeller. The Cherub's cylinder heads were exposed for cooling. A rounded decking, built up with stringers in the usual way, topped the fuselage from propeller to stern and contained the 4.5 imp gal tank immediately in front of the cockpit, high enough above the engine to allow it to be gravity fed. The overall fin plus rudder shape was not unlike the de Havilland form, though the rudder was not balanced. The tailplane had a straight leading edge inboard, then curved; it could be adjusted in incidence on the ground but not in the air. Its elevators were unbalanced and divided to allow rudder movement. The undercarriage was a simple single axle design using rubber shock absorbers, with the main legs attached to the lower longerons at the same points as the lift struts and braced to the most forward fuselage frame. It was completed with a tail skid.

Nick Comper took the CLA.3 for its first flight in mid-July 1925. The only significant later modification exchanged the geared Cherub II for a direct drive 36 hp (27 kW) Cherub III, fitted with a metal propeller.

== Operational history ==
Comper was still getting to know the CLA.3 when he flew it at the Royal Aero Club (RAC) race meeting Lympne in August 1925. It was the only new aircraft there. Several of the races were handicaps and did not reward the CLA.3, but it did win the Single-Seater Light 'Plane Scratch Speed Race and the accompanying £50 prize, albeit against only three other competitors. There was also a series of competitions to establish records in the light aeroplane Class, defined by the RAC as those with an engine weight of less than 170 lb (77 kg). The CLA.3 was the fastest out of a field of nine over 3 km, at a speed of 139.89 km/h. (86.9 mph). The same group of aircraft competed over 50 km, and here the CLA.3 came a close second at 135.5 km.h. (84.25 mph). In 1926, fitted with the Cherub III it flew in the King's Cup Race, but engine failure forced it out. The sole CLA.3 was scrapped in 1929.

== Specifications ==
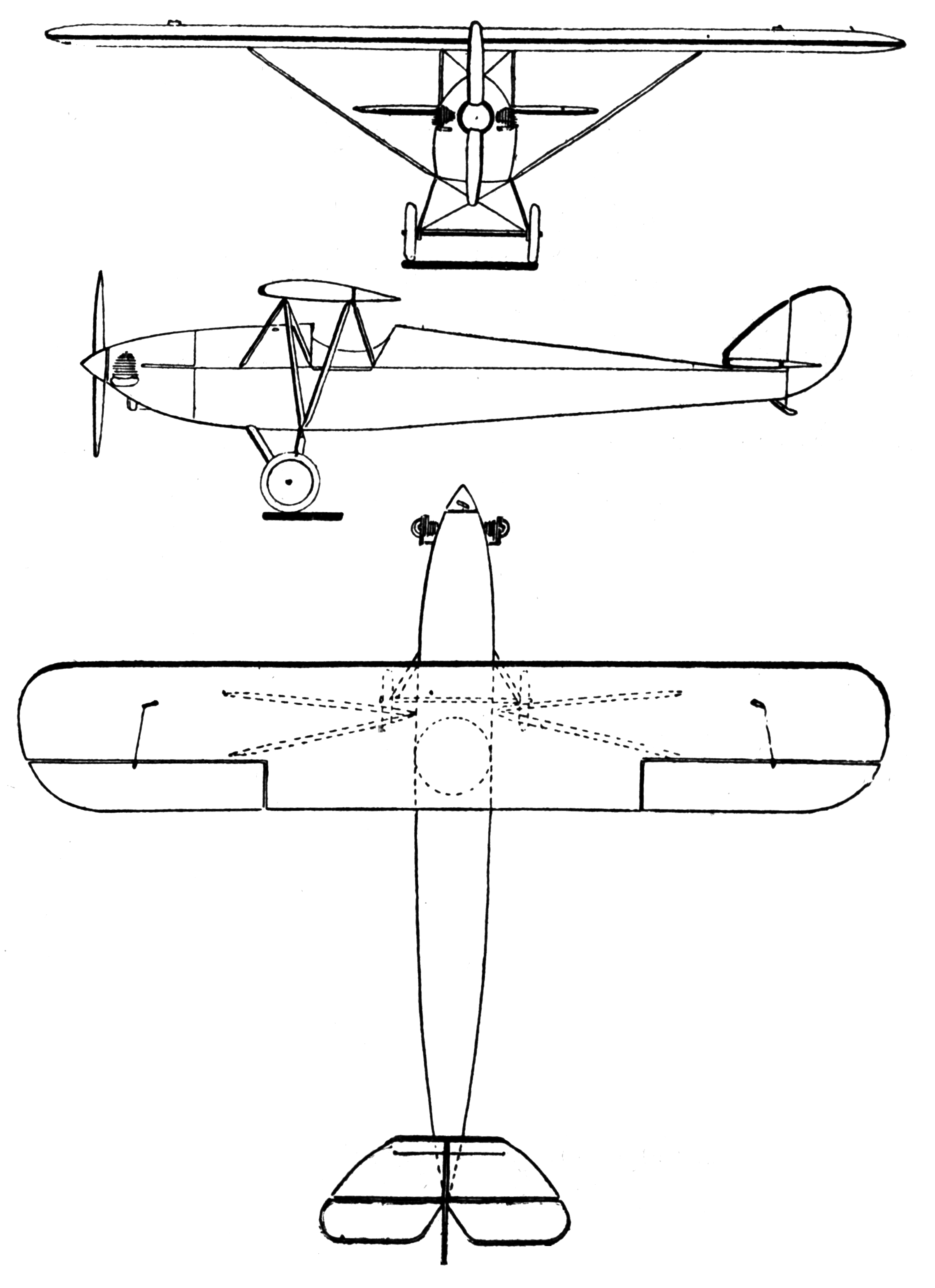
Cranwell C.L.A.3 3-view drawing from Les Ailes January 28,1926

Data from Flight 30 July 1925 p.484-7

General characteristics

- Crew: 1
- Length: 18 ft 6.5 in (5.652 m)
- Wingspan: 21 ft 0 in (6.40 m)
- Height: 6 ft 10 in (2.08 m)
- Wing area: 70 sq ft (6.5 m^{2})
- Airfoil: Eiffel 371
- Empty weight: 325 lb (147 kg)
- Gross weight: 530 lb (240 kg)
- Powerplant: 1 × Bristol Cherub II flat twin piston, 32 hp (24 kW)

Performance

- Maximum speed: 100 mph (160 km/h, 87 kn) estimated
- Cruise speed: 88 mph (142 km/h, 76 kn)
- Stall speed: 48 mph (77 km/h, 42 kn)
- Range: 175 mi (282 km, 152 nmi)
