= Comper Aircraft Company =

British light aircraft manufacturer

- Company type: aircraft manufacturer
- Founded: 1929
- Founder: Nicholas Comper
- Defunct: 1934
- Fate: ceased trading, renamed
- Successor: Heston Aircraft Company
- Headquarters: Hooton Aerodrome(1929–1933); Heston Aerodrome (1933–34)

The Comper Aircraft Company Ltd was a 1930s British light aircraft manufacturer. It was based at Hooton Aerodrome, Cheshire (1929–1933), and Heston Aerodrome, Middlesex (1933–1934).

== History ==
In April 1929, after leaving the Royal Air Force, Nicholas Comper formed the Comper Aircraft Company Ltd, based at Hooton Park Aerodrome near Ellesmere Port in Cheshire. Company directors included his brother Adrian Comper, his colleague Flt Lt J. Bernard Allen, George H Dawson, the owner of Hooton Park Aerodrome, and others. The company's first product was the Comper Swift, a single-seat sporting monoplane. After the prototype flew in January 1930, 40 production examples were built at Hooton. In 1932, in a joint venture, the company produced a prototype of the Cierva C.25 autogyro, using major elements of a Comper Swift.

In March 1933, after producing about 41 aircraft, the company moved to Heston Aerodrome near London. The first aircraft built at Heston was the Mouse, that first flew in September 1933. Other single examples produced at Heston were the Comper Streak and Comper Kite.

After an expensive move in a financial depression, and new aircraft designs but few sales, the company ceased trading in August 1934. Most of the directors resigned, including Nick Comper, and a new board was formed, headed by Sir Norman J Watson and Brindley 'Bryn' R.S. Jones. The company was renamed Heston Aircraft Company Ltd, effective 10 August 1934.

== Aircraft ==
- 1930 - Comper Swift
- 1932 - Cierva C.25
- 1933 - Comper Mouse
- 1934 - Comper Streak
- 1934 - Comper Kite
