= Cranwell CLA.4 =

Small aircraft

CLA.4
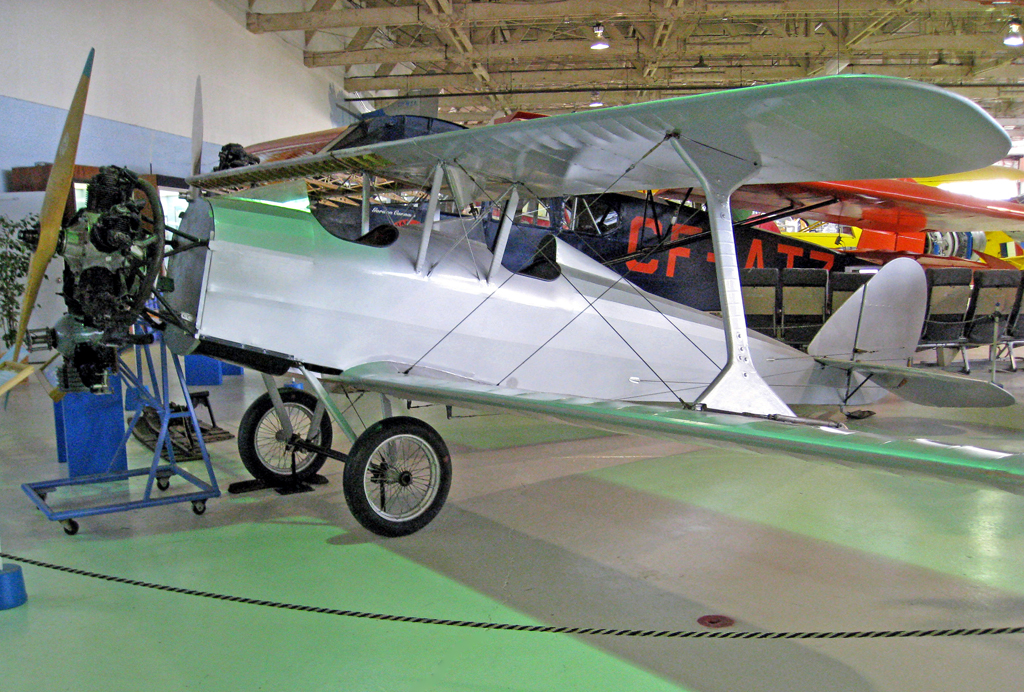
- The third CLA.4 exhibited after restoration at the Alberta Aviation Museum in Edmonton

General information
- Type: Two-seat sports aircraft
- National origin: United Kingdom
- Manufacturer: Cranwell Light Aeroplane Club
- Designer: Nicholas Comper
- Status: One example preserved in museum
- Primary user: Aero clubs
- Number built: 3

History
- First flight: August 1926
- Retired: 1934

The Cranwell CLA.4 was a single-engined two-seat inverted sesquiplane designed and constructed for the 1926 Lympne trials by an amateur group from RAF College Cranwell. Two were entered, though engine problems prevented one from taking part; the other was eliminated with a broken undercarriage. A third aircraft was amateur-built in Canada and flew until 1934.

== Design and development ==
The Cranwell Light Aeroplane (CLA) club was formed in 1923 by staff and students at the RAF College Cranwell. The students came from No.4 Apprentices Wing and one of their lecturers, Flt-Lt Nicholas Comper became chief designer of the three aircraft produced by the club as well as one, the CLA.1 that was not completed. The last of the series, the CLA.4 was designed to compete in the 1926 Lympne Light Aeroplane Trials. Two were built for this competition, one to be powered by a Bristol Cherub engine and the other by the new Pobjoy P. Unfortunately, the latter engine failed its own trials not long before the Lympne event and only the Cherub powered aircraft took part. Since the CL.4 had been designed for the 65 hp (48 kW) Pobjoy, the 36 hp (27 kW) Cherub left it seriously underpowered.

Many sesquiplanes have flown, the great majority of types having a smaller lower wing than upper. The CLA.4, unusually, was an inverted sesquiplane with a smaller upper wing, joining a small group of aircraft like the Fiat CR.1 of 1924 and the later Caproni Ca.100, Caproni Ca.164 and Levasseur PL.15, all military machines. There is a small aerodynamic penalty for this arrangement, but the advantages for a club machine are good vision, and ease of escape, from both cockpits. In the case of the CLA.4, the upper wing had a span of 80% of the lower and 83% of its chord. The wings were straight, unswept and of constant chord apart from at the rounded tips, with ailerons on the lower wings only. The CLA.4 was a single bay biplane with inward leaning single wide chord interplane struts with wide, faired roots. Two pairs of centre section struts held the upper wing well clear of the fuselage; the absence of stagger made wing-folding easy. Like much of the rest of the aircraft, the wings were of fabric covered wood.

The fuselage was built up on four longerons, spruce at the rear where they were linked into a tapering Warren girder, and ash ahead of the rear cockpit where more traditional wire braced rectangular forms were used. It was topped with a standard rounded decking. The two open cockpits were placed at the leading and trailing upper wing edges and fitted with dual controls. The flat twin Bristol Cherub III was mounted on a steel plate and smoothly partially cowled to a neatly pointed nose, but with the cylinder heads exposed for cooling. At the rear of the fuselage the fin and tailplane were fabric covered metal structures, though the generous control surfaces were wood framed. Fin and rudder together formed a shape not unlike that of many de Havilland aircraft though more rounded and unbalanced. The main undercarriage was built from a pair of steel V-shaped tubes bearing a single axle and rubber cord shock absorbers.

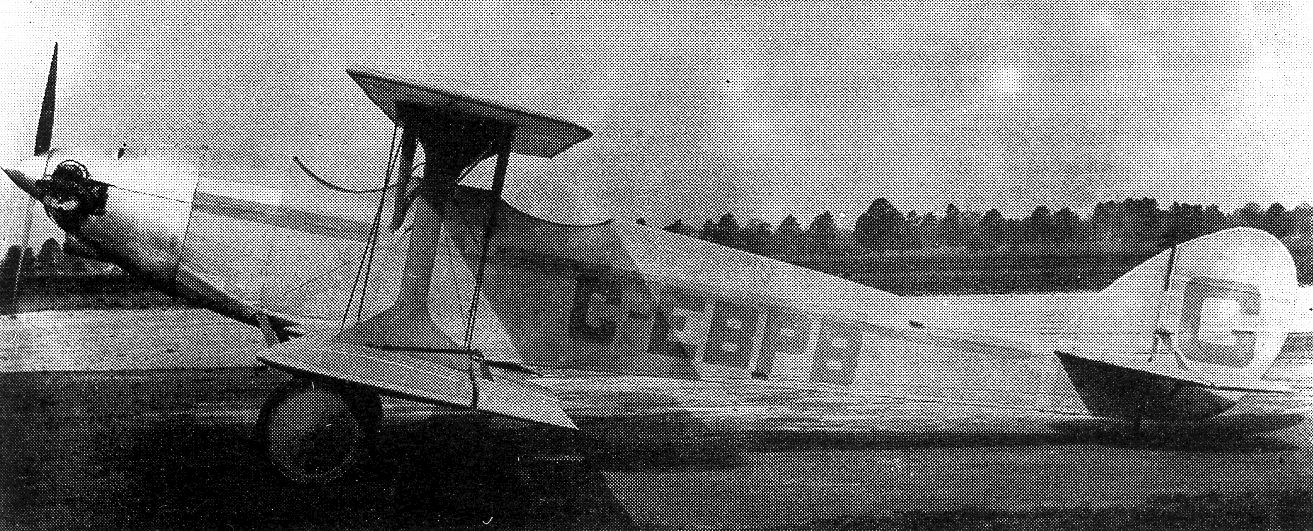
The first CLA.4

== Operational history ==
Two CLA.4s were built for the Lympne trials, the Cherub powered G-EBPB, entry no.12 and the Pobjoy powered G-EBPC. no.11. The latter was withdrawn because of the Pobjoy problems and was one of three withdrawals before the start on 10 September, leaving 13 competitors. On the following day no.12, flown by Nick Comper suffered an undercarriage failure and was refused permission to replace it, forcing retirement. Comper went on to fly the aircraft at the Bournemouth meeting in 1927 and in the King's Cup of the same year, then at Blackpool and Orly meetings in 1928 without great success. Its Cherub, normally a reliable engine (the top four aircraft at Lympne 1926 had used it) seems to have been a poor sample. The aircraft was sold into private ownership and flew until scrapped in 1933.

The second Cranwell built CLA.4, G-EBPC was also fitted with a Cherub but was destroyed in a crash in March 1927. At least one other CLA.4 was built, but not at Cranwell. Plans were sold to the Alberta Aero Club (now the Edmonton Flying Club) of Edmonton, Canada, which intended to build it as the Club's first aircraft. This project was not completed and the plans, incomplete airframe, two engines and parts were sold to Alf Want of Edmonton, who had done the most work on the project. He built it at his home, fitting a Blackburne Thrush. Dates are uncertain, but it seems to have flown from 1931 or 1932 until a crash due to icing near what is now the City Centre Airport in February 1934, making it the last CLA.4 to fly. During this period it was re-engined with a more powerful 55 hp Viele M-5 engine to improve its performance, perhaps to cope with the higher operating altitude of Edmonton.

In 1989 Want presented the remains to the Alberta Aviation Museum, Edmonton, where it is being restored to flying condition. In 2001 it was displayed in a half-covered state so its structure could be seen and appreciated but by 2008 was fully covered aft of the engine firewall. Its original Blackburne Thrush is displayed beside it and the other Thrush is now in the Reynolds-Alberta Museum collection. The aircraft has never been registered with the Canadian authorities.

== Naming ==
At least some contemporary sources like Flight refer to both the Cranwell built aircraft by the number 4 (or sometimes IV), with no letter suffix. The Civil Aviation Authority first registration documents refer to the Cherub powered G-EBPB as a CLA.4A and the other machine as a CLA.4, and later authors use this engine based distinction. They generally agree that G-EBPB is a CLA.4A; but some imply G-EBPB became a CLA.4A when fitted with the Cherub with which it always flew, whereas others continue to use the original CLA.4 name.

== Specifications ==
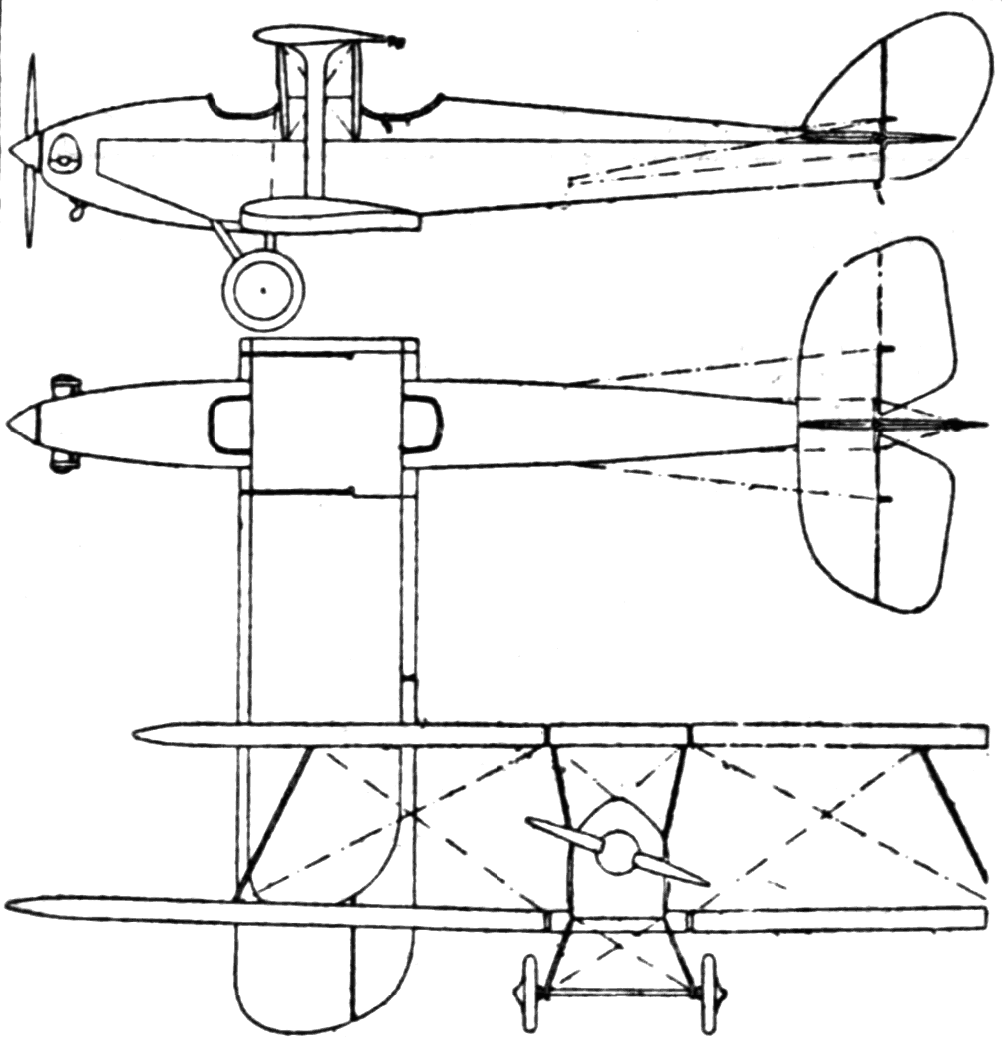
Cranwell CLA IV 3-view drawing from Le Document aéronautique October,1926

Data from Jackson 1973, p. 296

General characteristics

- Crew: 2
- Length: 22 ft 3.5 in (6.795 m)
- Wingspan: 27 ft 4 in (8.33 m) overall
- Upper wingspan: 22 ft 0 in (6.71 m)
- Lower wingspan: 27 ft 4 in (8.33 m)
- Wing area: 164 sq ft (15.2 m^{2})
- Airfoil: modified RAF31
- Empty weight: 480 lb (218 kg)
- Gross weight: 874 lb (396 kg)
- Powerplant: 1 × Bristol Cherub III flat twin piston engine

Performance

- Maximum speed: 65 mph (105 km/h, 56 kn)
