= Cranwell CLA.2 =

CLA.2
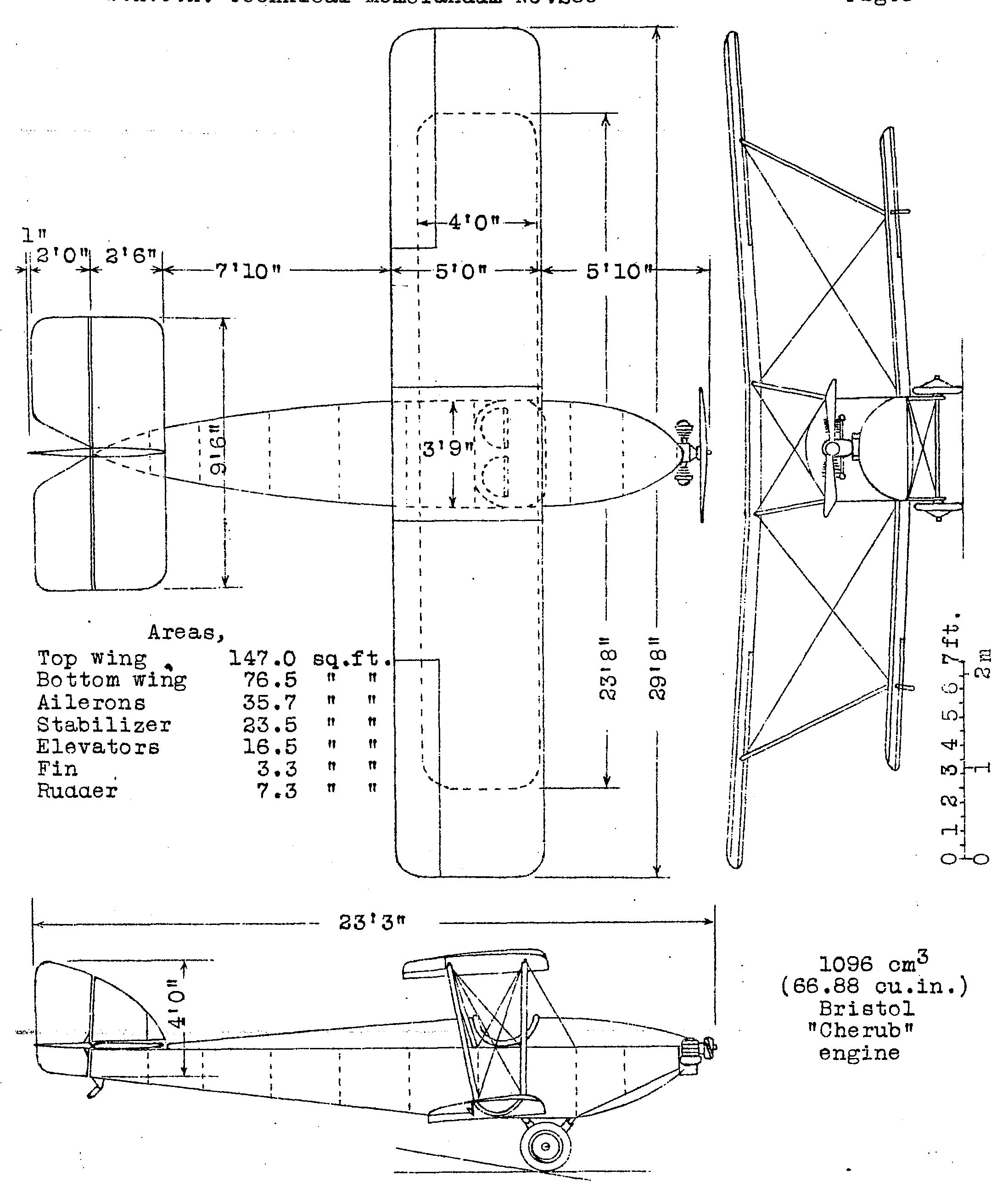

General information
- Type: Two-seat light aircraft
- National origin: United Kingdom
- Manufacturer: The Cranwell Light Aeroplane Club
- Designer: Nicholas Comper
- Number built: 1

History
- First flight: 14 September 1924

The Cranwell CLA.2 was a single-engined two-seat biplane built by staff and students of RAF College Cranwell as an entrant to the Lympne Two Seater Light Aeroplane Trials of 1924. It won the reliability prize.

== Design and development ==
The CLA.2 was the first aircraft completed by the Cranwell Light Aeroplane (CLA) club, formed in 1923 by staff and students at the RAF College Cranwell. The students came from No.4 Apprentices Wing and one of their lecturers, Flt-Lt Nicholas Comper, became chief designer of the three aircraft produced by the club as well as one, the CLA.1, that was not finished. The immediate target was the Lympne Two Seater Light Aeroplane Trials of 1924, but the emphasis was on producing a robust machine that could be simply built and maintained at low cost, suitable for flying schools. It was built from wood and fabric covered throughout. Though it probably had the shortest flying career of any of the CLA's aircraft, it was one of the most profitable.

The Cranwell CLA.2 (or Cranwell II as it sometimes appears) was a largely conventional two-seat single-engined biplane, with some unusual features. It was a single bay sesquiplane the lower wing having an area only 52% of the upper one. As a result of the different spans, the interplane struts leant strongly outwards. The interplane gap was unusually large, with the aim of reducing interference effects between the wings; these deleterious interplane effects were still not widely appreciated in 1924. The wings lacked stagger and sweep; both had constant chord and ailerons were carried on both wings, with their own internal control runs. The CL.2 was a two-seater (with dual controls as required by the Lympne competition rules) with pilot and pupil sitting side by side under the forward part of the upper wing, and as a result the fuselage was broad at this point (3 ft 9 in or 1.14 m), broader than it was deep. Another consequence was that the centre section struts from the upper wing to the fuselage top longerons were unusually widely spaced, a spacing enhanced by a slight outward lean. The wings did not fold but could be rapidly removed for transport.

The fuselage was flat-sided, built up around four longerons which were made of spruce at the rear and ash forward of the cockpit. Behind the cockpit, the fuselage narrowed in plan view in a gently curved way to the tail, but less usually Comper made the fuselage reduce in depth also; whilst the upper longeron was horizontal with the aircraft in flying position, the lower one was angled upwards. The fin and rudder formed an approximate quadrant, though the unbalanced rudder extended down between the elevators to the fuselage bottom. The nearly rectangular tailplane was mounted on the upper longeron. A standard curved decking, built up with stringers over frames topped the fuselage from front to rear. Forward of the cockpit the lower longerons curved strongly upwards and inwards, meeting the now inward curving upper members at the engine bulkhead, on which was mounted the 32 hp (24 kW) Bristol Cherub I flat-twin driving a two-bladed small diameter propeller. The single axle undercarriage was mounted on a pair of short V-shaped legs, each V cut out of plywood and mounted vertically on the lower longerons, so that the track was about 4 ft (1.22 m). The CLA.2 sat close to the ground, with its wheels only slightly ahead of and below the wing leading edge.

The CLA. 2 first flew, with its designer at the controls, on 14 September 1924. The Lympne competition began two weeks later, with the elimination trials on 27–8 September. Labelled as aircraft No.3 and registered as G-EBKC the CLA.2 completed these successfully, but like several other aircraft failed to complete all the speed and takeoff tests, coming sixth out of seven overall. It did, however fly for nearly 18 hours and covered more than 760 miles (1,250 km), winning the valuable £300 reliability prize. After the light plane trials the CLA.2 went to RAF Martlesham Heath. It was written off by an Air Ministry pilot sometime before 20 May 1925. The Air Ministry compensated the CLA club for this loss. No more CLA.2s were built, but the prize money and the compensation helped to fund the CLA club's next aircraft, the Cranwell CLA.3.

== Specifications ==
Data from Flight 25 September 1924

General characteristics

- Crew: two
- Length: 23 ft 3 in (7.09 m)
- Upper wingspan: 29 ft 8 in (9.04 m)
- Lower wingspan: 23 ft 8 in (7.21 m)
- Wing area: 223.5 sq ft (20.76 m^{2}) (upper wing area 147 sq ft (13.66 m^{2}), lower wing area 76.5 sq ft (7.11 m^{2}))
- Airfoil: RAF 64
- Empty weight: 540 lb (245 kg)
- Gross weight: 897 lb (407 kg)
- Powerplant: 1 × Bristol Cherub I flat twin, 32 hp (24 kW)

Performance

- Maximum speed: 62.5 mph (100.6 km/h, 54.3 kn)
