= Comper Mouse =

Mouse
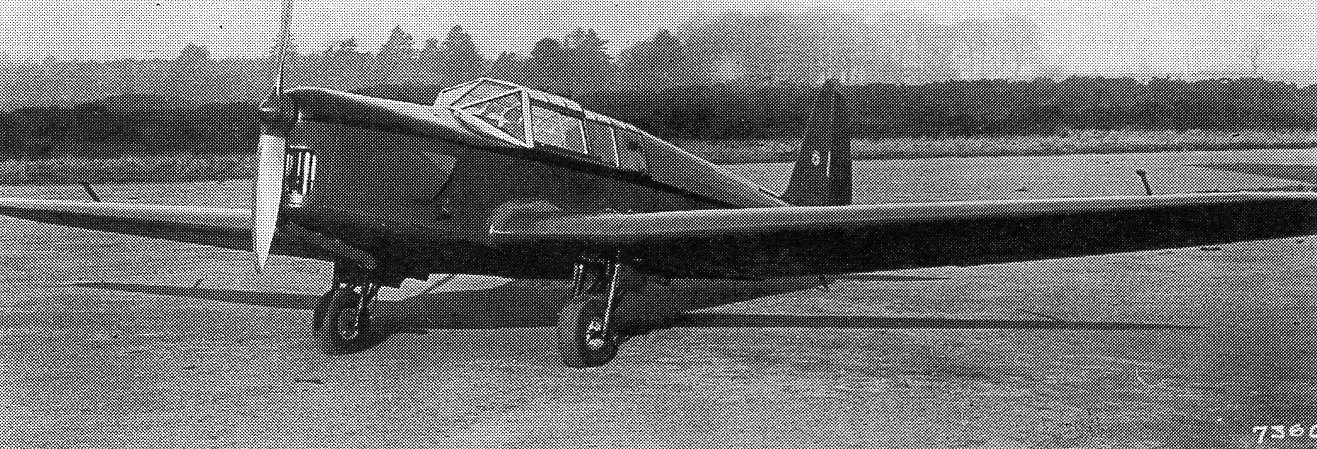

General information
- Type: Three-seat cabin monoplane
- National origin: United Kingdom
- Manufacturer: Comper Aircraft Company
- Designer: Nicholas Comper
- Number built: 1

History
- First flight: 11 September 1933
- Retired: 1935

The Comper Mouse was a 1930s British three-seat cabin monoplane designed by Nicholas Comper, and built by the Comper Aircraft Company at Heston Aerodrome in 1933.

The Mouse was a low-wing monoplane touring aircraft, powered by a 130 hp (97 kW) de Havilland Gipsy Major piston engine. Construction was mainly of fabric-covered spruce wood frames, with some plywood-covered sections. It had folding wings, retractable main landing gear and a fixed tailskid. Accommodation was for the pilot and two passengers, accessible via a sliding framed canopy, plus an additional luggage locker.

== Development ==
The Comper Mouse was a low-wing cantilever monoplane that was promoted as being suitable for use by private owners, for air taxi services, or other forms of commercial operation. It was designed to cruise at 130 mph across a distance of up to 600 miles. The aircraft could accommodate up to three people within its cabin. The two front seats in the cabin were arranged side-by-side, an arrangement that was viewed as favourable for the instruction of student pilots as well as being easier for conversing. Either seat could be unfastened and slid rearwards so that the non-piloting occupant could move back to comfortably communicate with the person in the third seat, which was placed in a central position behind the two forward seats. The Mouse also featured a patented sliding roof over the cabin. This roof could be opened mid-flight to aid in visibility when approaching an airport under unfavourable weather conditions or in advance of performing a forced landing in which the aircraft potentially turning over was a risk.

The Mouse was furnished with several noteworthy features for the era; one of the more difficult engineering challenges was its adoption of a retractable landing gear arrangement, which Comper pursued a patent for. Each wheel (and its associated axle) was carried upon a series of welded square steel tubes; the manner in which these were arranged, placing bronze blocks against rubber pads, permitted it to slide up and down. The front of each unit was supported by a torque tube that was carried behind the front spar; the rotation of this tube moved the whole unit, which could either be swung up into the wing between the spars or deployed downwards prior to landing. Each unit was locked in the up or down positions using spring-loaded pins that would engage with fittings on specially-strengthened ribs. These pins were automatically withdrawn when the torque tubes were turned. This mechanism was claimed to be relatively easy to work, each unit being controlled by an individual lever and both levels being located between the front seats in close proximity to one another. Furthermore, a red warning lamp, which automatically lit up if the throttle was pulled back when the wheels were in still retracted, was present amongst the cockpit instrumentation.

Another mechanism developed, and patented, by Comper was the folding wing mechanism. The hinges for which were located between the front and rear spars while the latter were attached to the centre section of the wing via several vertical pins. Although conventional fittings were retained on the ends of the spars that were screwed in place, these could be rapidly withdrawn. Folding was achieved by pulling each wing away from the centre section, which remained supported on a sizable tube about which it was rotated until the leading edge of the wing was pointed downwards. This tube was hinged so that the wing could then be folded back against the fuselage. The controls for the ailerons would automatically uncouple during the folding process while the wing lacked flaps, as these were deemed to have been unnecessary. Furthermore; the main spar fittings were protected against both wear and the development of movements that could lead to wing flutter.

In terms of its aerodynamic properties, the Mouse was a relatively clean aircraft. One such refinement in this was the design of the push rods used to actuate the ailerons, which were completely enclosed within the wings and were attached to the aileron spars directly above the hinges. An atypical feature of the aircraft’s control system was a special type of joint that used extensively. This joint consists of a ball that swivelled freely and was held between a pair of flanged plates on the end of the push rod. The other rod ended in a fork, the pin of which went through the ball; the whole formed a universal joint.

The aircraft made use of a well-proven structure that conformed with Comper’s existing practices. It was built entirely of wood while the wing, with the exception of the leading edge, was covered with fabric. The fuselage was a built-up wooden girder that was mostly covered with fabric as well. This simplistic construction approach had proven to be robust in service as well as being easy to repair. The fuselage was divided aft of the cabin. It used a wooden girder structure with spruce members as well as pinned and glued plywood pieces at joints. The forward portion of the fuselage rested on the centre section, to which it was fastened to via three fittings on either side. The longerons ran along the deck.

The tail unit was fitted with a wooden stabilizer that was mounted on top of the fuselage; it had routed spars and solid spruce diagonal bracing. It was covered with fabric and was hinged at the rear spar. Adjustable struts were attached to the bottom of the fuselage while fittings beneath the forward spar were used for adjusting the angle of incidence while on the ground. Furthermore, the tail was furnished with unbalanced elevators, a cantilever fin and an unbalanced rudder that was composed of welded steel tube and covered with fabric.

It was powered by a single de Havilland Gipsy Major piston engine that was installed upon a welded steel-tube mounting just forward of a fireproof bulkhead. Fuel was stored with a pair of steel tanks within each wing as well as a single gravity tank that was located just aft of the fireproof bulkhead. Fue was supplied via pumps that were automatically primed following a gravity-fed ignition of the engine. Refuelling was achieved via a comparatively large aperture on the upper tank. A single cylindrical oil tank was present within the fuselage, it had a passage through it for cooling the oil.

== Prototype and into flight ==
On 11 September 1933, the maiden flight of the Mouse was conducted at Heston Aerodrome, piloted by Nicholas Comper himself. During February 1934, it was assessed at A&AEE Martlesham Heath, the results of which led to various minor design changes being made.

On 13–14 July 1934, the Mouse (registered G-ACIX) was flown by E.H. Newman in handicapped heats for the King's Cup Race at Hatfield Aerodrome under poor weather conditions. It failed to reach the final race, despite an average speed of 132.75 mph (213.64 km/h). In an already competitive market for touring aircraft, the Mouse failed to attract sales, and only the one aircraft was completed before the company ceased trading in August 1934.

== Specifications ==
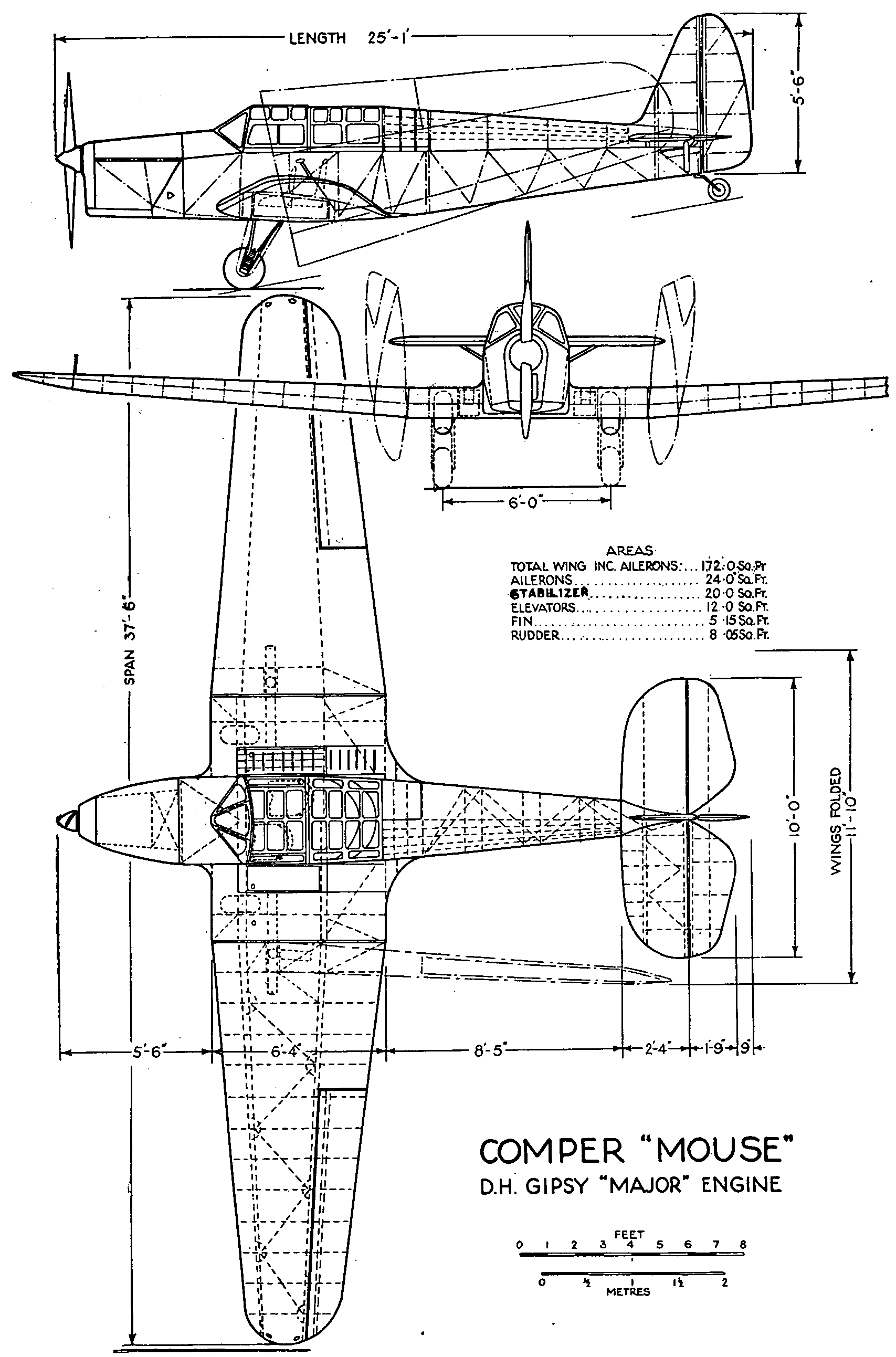
Comper Mouse 3-view drawing from NACA-AC-184

Data from The Whole Truth: The Comper Lightplanes Part Seven, National Advisory Committee for Aeronautics

General characteristics

- Crew: One (pilot)
- Capacity: Two passengers
- Length: 25 ft 1 in (7.65 m)
- Wingspan: 37 ft 6 in (11.43 m)
- Width: 11 ft 10 in (3.61 m) (folded)
- Height: 6 ft 9 in (2.06 m)
- Wing area: 172 sq ft (16.0 m^{2})
- Empty weight: 1,300 lb (590 kg)
- Gross weight: 2,215 lb (1,005 kg)
- Fuel capacity: 32.75 imp gal (39.33 US gal; 148.9 L)
- Powerplant: 1 × de Havilland Gipsy Major piston engine , 130 hp (97 kW)

Performance

- Maximum speed: 135 mph (217 km/h, 117 kn)
- Cruise speed: 130 mph (210 km/h, 110 kn)
- Range: 600 mi (970 km, 520 nmi)
