= Bristol Brownie =

Light sports airplane

Type 91 Brownie
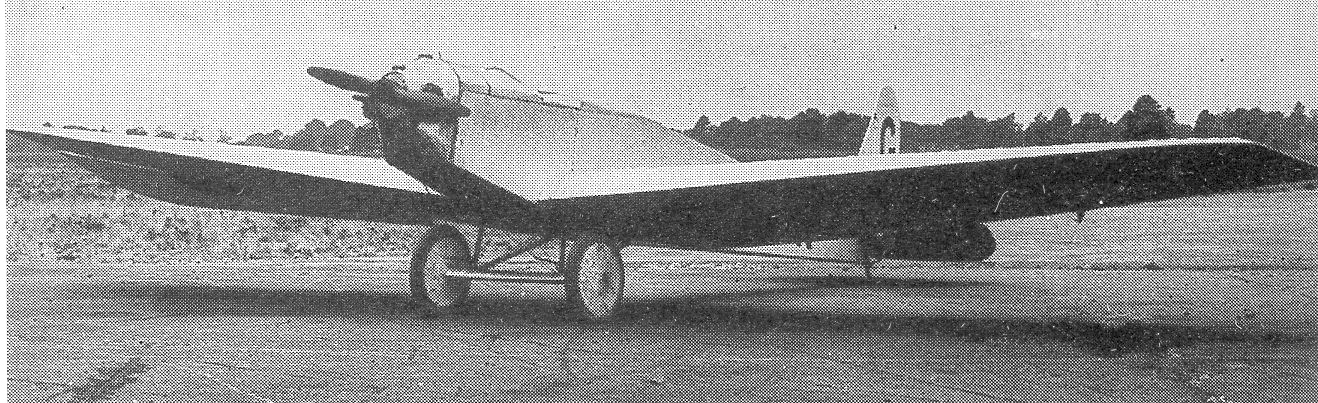

General information
- Type: Sports aircraft
- Manufacturer: Bristol Aeroplane Company
- Designer: Frank Barnwell
- Number built: 3

History
- First flight: 6 August 1924

The Bristol Type 91 Brownie was a light sports aircraft produced in the United Kingdom by the Bristol Aeroplane Company in 1924. It was a low-wing cantilever monoplane aircraft of conventional configuration with fixed tailskid undercarriage. The pilot and passenger sat in tandem open cockpits. It won the £1,000 prize for second place at the Lympne light aircraft trials in October 1924.

== Design ==
Bristol had not built an aircraft to compete in the 1923 Lympne light aircraft trials, which had been for aircraft with engines of 750 cc or less, making use of Bristol's Cherub engine impossible. The rules were changed for the 1924 trials, permitting engines of up to 1,100 cc to be used, and accordingly Frank Barnwell started design work on a competitor early in 1924. He produced studies for alternative wood and metal aircraft, and after consideration of these the Board of Bristol Aircraft authorised the production of two aircraft on 4 February, adding a third on 5 May. All three aircraft had a similar fuselage, made of wire-braced high-tensile steel tubing, but for experimental purposes three different wing designs were produced: a 34 ft 7in (10.54m) span wooden wing and two different metal wings, one of 36 ft 7 in (11.15 m) span of all-steel construction, the other, intended for high-speed use, of 30 ft 7 in (9.32 m) span with combined steel and duralumin construction. To satisfy the rules of the competition the wings had to be readily detachable and the aircraft fitted with dual controls.

The three aircraft were registered G-EBJK, G-EBJL and G-EBJM on 14 July, and immediately named Jack, Jill and Jim. G-EBJK, fitted with the wooden wings, was the first flown, on 6 Aug piloted by Cyril Uwins. It performed and handled so well that a second flight was immediately made by Frank Barnwell, followed by a third by Uwins and Barnwell together. G-EBJL, which had the large metal wings fitted, first flew on 22 September and G-EBJM, completed as a single-seater with a long-range tank and the smaller metal wings, followed on 4 September.

All took part in the trials, which took place between 27 September and 4 October. Uwins, flying 'JK, winning second prize in the main trials. 'JL, to be flown by T.W. Campbell, was withdrawn because of aileron flutter, and Campbell in 'JM won third place in the Grosvenor Cup race, averaging over 70 mph.

== Development ==
After the Lympne trials 'JK and 'JL were delivered to Martlesham Heath for evaluation as a primary trainer, but did not impress the Air Ministry enough for any development to be funded by them.

G-EBJK was returned to Filton for modifications in December 1925. It was fitted with the newly developed 36 hp Cherub III mounted slightly lower in the fuselage, and the top longerons were curved down more to improve the view from the rear cockpit. The fuel tank was enlarged and it was fitted with new metal wings giving it a span of 37 ft 7 in (11.45 m). This was designated Type 91A.

After further trials at Martlesham it was again returned to Filton, where the engine mounting was further lowered and a Fairey-Reed duralmin propeller fitted. Additionally, a curved decking was added to the rear fuselage, and it was fitted with an enlarged horn-balanced rudder and a new undercarriage using rubber shock absorbers. This was designated Type 91 B, or Brownie II. In this form the aircraft took place in the 1926 Lympne trials, where Uwins won the third place prize of £500.

== Specifications (Brownie I, wooden wing) ==
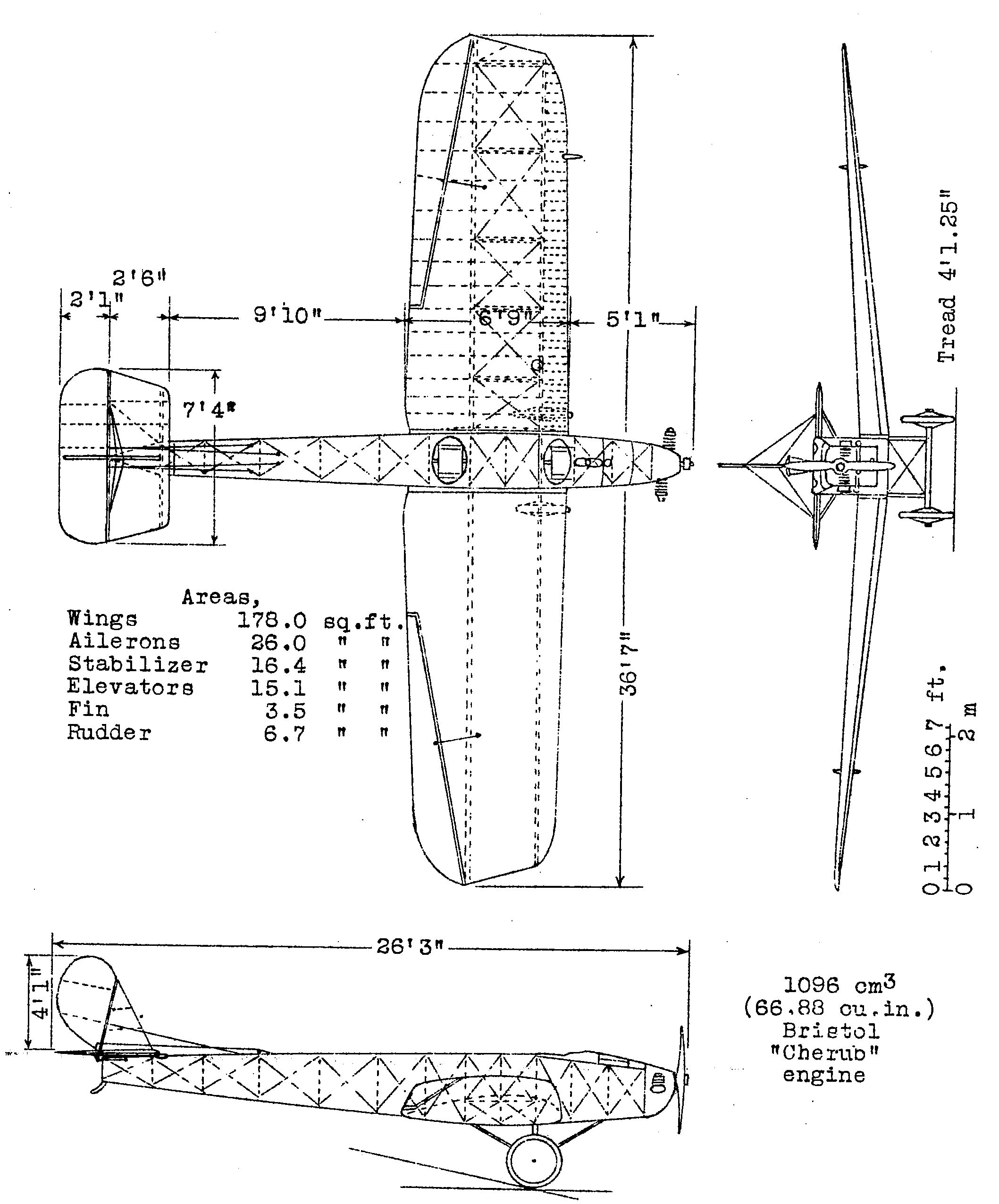
Bristol Brownie 3-view drawing from NACA-TM-289

Data from Bristol Aircraft Since 1910

General characteristics

- Crew: 1
- Capacity: 1 passenger
- Length: 26 ft 3 in (8.00 m)
- Wingspan: 34 ft 7 in (10.54 m)
- Height: 6 ft 6 in (1.98 m)
- Wing area: 204 sq ft (19.0 m^{2})
- Empty weight: 500 lb (227 kg)
- Gross weight: 870 lb (395 kg)
- Powerplant: 1 × Bristol Cherub I 2-cylinder air-cooled horizontally-opposed piston engine, 32 hp (24 kW)
- Propellers: 2-bladed fixed-pitch propeller

Performance

- Maximum speed: 70 mph (110 km/h, 61 kn)
- Range: 100 mi (160 km, 87 nmi)

== See also ==
Aircraft of comparable role, configuration, and era Most British manufacturers produced aircraft to take part in the Lympne trials, and there are therefore a number of directly comparable aircraft, including:

- Avro Avis
- Beardmore Wee Bee
- De Havilland Humming Bird
- English Electric Wren
- Gloster Gannet
- Gnosspelius Gull
- Hawker Cygnet
- Parnall Pixie
- Supermarine Sparrow
- Vickers Vagabond
- Westland Woodpigeon
