= Parnall Pixie =

Pixie
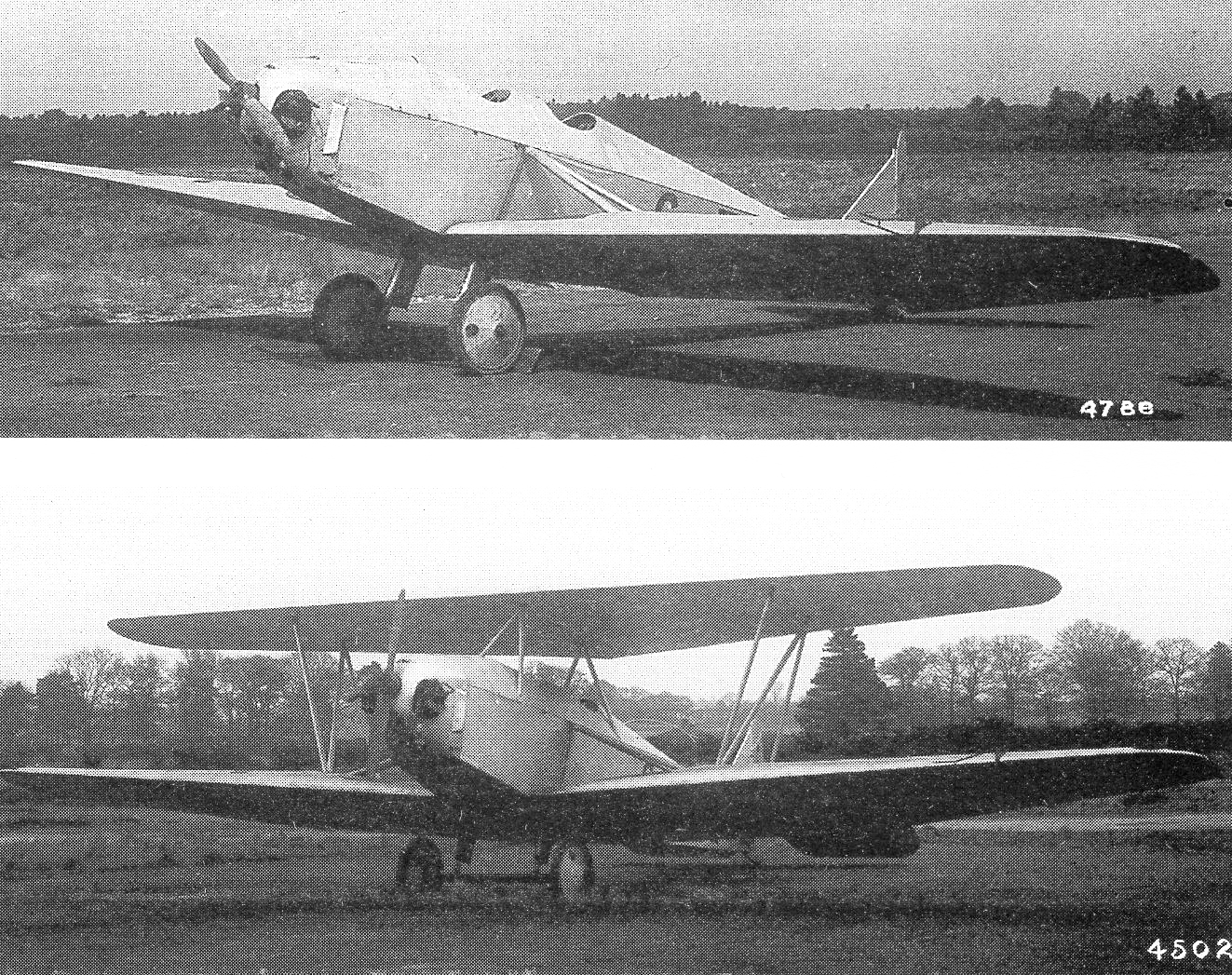
- Pixie III G-EBJG in monoplane and biplane configurations

General information
- Type: Light aircraft
- National origin: United Kingdom
- Manufacturer: George Parnall & Co.
- Designer: Harold Bolas
- Number built: 3

History
- First flight: 13 September 1923
- Retired: 1939

The Parnall Pixie was a low powered British single-seat monoplane light aircraft originally designed to compete in the Lympne, UK trials for motor-gliders in 1923, where it was flown successfully by Norman Macmillan. It had two sets of wings, one for cross-country flights and the other for speed; it later appeared as a biplane which could be converted into a monoplane.

== Design and development ==
Though only three Parnall Pixies were built, they appeared with a remarkable variety of wings; a normal span monoplane (Pixie I); a short span monoplane (Pixie II); a biplane readily convertible to a monoplane (Pixie IIIA); and a non-convertible monoplane version of the latter, with a greater span than the Pixie I. The first Pixie was designed to compete in the Lympne Light Aeroplane Trials of 1923, organised by the Royal Aero Club for what they described as single-seat motor-gliders. The intention was to develop economical private aviation, so the engine size was limited to 750 cc with immediate consequences for aircraft size and weight. Various sponsors provided attractive prizes, particularly the total of £1500 jointly from the Duke of Sutherland and the Daily Mail. The event took place from 8–13 October 1923. There were many entrants from the British aviation industry, including the de Havilland Humming Bird, Gloster Gannet and Vickers Viget. The Pixie I first flew, at Filton on 13 September 1923, in good time for the competition.

The sole Pixie I & II, registered G-EBKM, was the same aircraft apart from the wings and engine. The common fuselage was built around four spruce longerons, stiffened by diagonals or plywood sheet, though most of the fuselage was fabric covered; it had with a rounded decking. The single cockpit was at mid wing chord. The engine was mounted on steel tubes fixed to the ends of the longerons, with a firewall between engine and pilot. There was a triangular tailplane bearing a single piece elevator, with hinge just at the end of the fuselage where there was also a small tail skid. The fin was also triangular, though its trailing edge, carrying the rudder hinge, leant slightly forward, helping the large and almost semi-circular rudder to clear the elevator. The main undercarriage was unusual and looked rather vulnerable. Two steel tubes formed an inverted V, joined at the top to the upper fuselage internally and emerging below to meet a cross-axle at points not much further apart than the width of the fuselage. The axle was more than twice this width, giving a wide track arrangement which was sprung only by deflection of the V struts.

Both pairs of wings had similar planforms and the same centre section chord. The leading edges were straight apart from at the tips, as were the centre section trailing edges. Outboard the trailing edges, fully occupied with ailerons swept forward, more sharply on the short span wing. The ailerons were of the differential kind, a recent invention, with less downward movement than upward. Both wing sets were built up around two spruce spars; the only novelty was that the rear spar was not straight but came in two joined sections, the outer part swept forward to meet the forward spar at the wingtip. The wings were hinged to the lower longerons and braced by a pair of streamlined steel tubes from spars to upper longerons.

The wings of the Pixie I, long span and designed for fuel economy had a span of 28 ft 6 in and an area of 100 sq ft (9.3 m^{2}), whereas those of the Pixie II, designed for speed had a span of 17 ft 10 in (5.44 m) and an area of 60 sq ft (5.57 m^{2}). The engines were chosen to match the same purposes. For economy the Pixie I had a 500 cc Douglas horizontal twin and the Pixie II a more powerful 750 cc (the competition limit) engine of the same make and configuration. In 1924 it was flying with a 696 cc Blackburne Tomtit engine. These engines were mounted low on the nose, driving a two-bladed propeller on a shaft above it via a chain reduction gear of ratio 2.5:1.

The rules of the 1924 Lympne trials were revised to allow more practical aircraft, rather than motor-gliders. Parnall therefore built a two-seat version, the Pixie IIIA with its fuselage extended by 3 ft 2 in (965 mm) to allow a second cockpit, one now above each wing spar and the wing span extended to 32 ft 5 in. A demountable upper wing, attached by N form interplane struts and several cabane struts and of markedly smaller span and deep central chord allowed the IIIA to be flown either as monoplane or biplane. Its undercarriage legs now had rubber compression shock absorbers. Two were built, one with a 32 hp Bristol Cherub III engine and the other with a 35 hp Blackburne Thrush. After the trials and in the following year, the Thrush was replaced with a 1,100 cc Anzani. In 1926, both IIIAs were converted to permanent monoplane configuration as Pixie IIIs, both now with the Bristol engine.

== Operational history ==
The Pixie did well at Lympne, winning the £500 speed prize at 76.1 mph (122 k/h) as the Pixie II. The Pixie II also won the Wakefield prize at 81 mph (130 km/h) at Hendon, later that October. It flew mostly as the Pixie II thereafter, appearing at Lympne races in 1924 and, with an enlarged rudder, in 1925. It also flew in the RAF display of 1924. After a period of inactivity from about 1925 to 1937, it was in the air again until it crashed in April 1939.

Neither Pixie IIIA, competing as biplanes, made as much impact at Lympne 1924, with the Cherub engined machine retiring early, though it flew later in the week as a monoplane. The other, G-EBKK flying as no.19 and flown by W. Douglas completed all tasks but the two sets of five laps required by the high speed tests. Only two aircraft, the Bristol Brownie and the Beardmore Wee Bee, the overall winner, did complete these high speed tests. It was the top-scorer in the low speed test. At the end of the Lympne trials, no.19 went on to compete in the Grosvenor Cup handicap, where it finished fifth. Converted to Pixie III standard they both flew on into the 1930s, one (G-EBJG) surviving World War II in store but not flying afterwards. Its remains are in deep store in the Midland Air Museum, Coventry.

== Specifications (Pixie II) ==
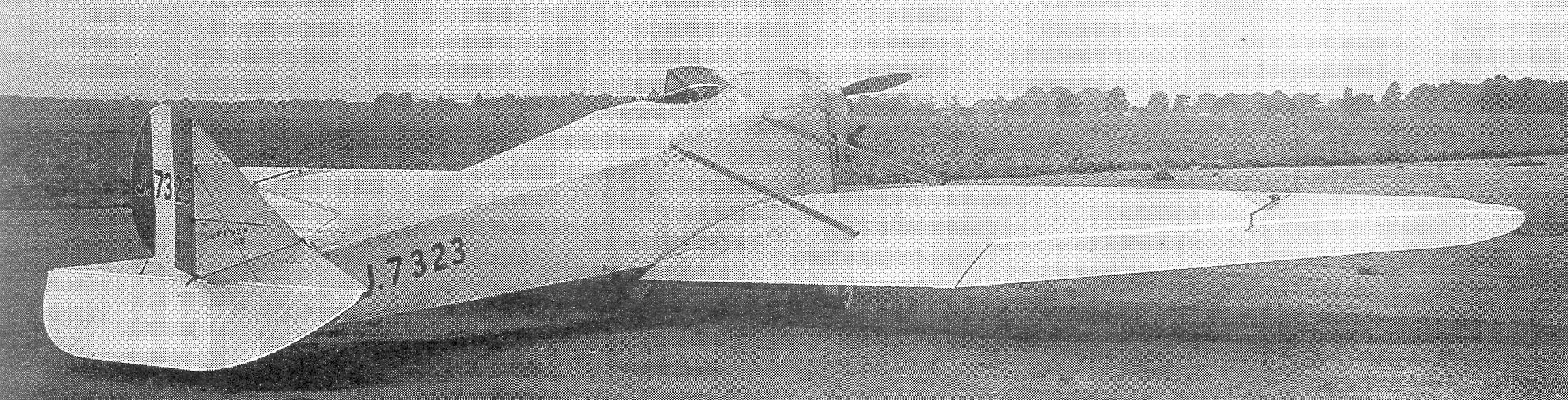
Pixie II

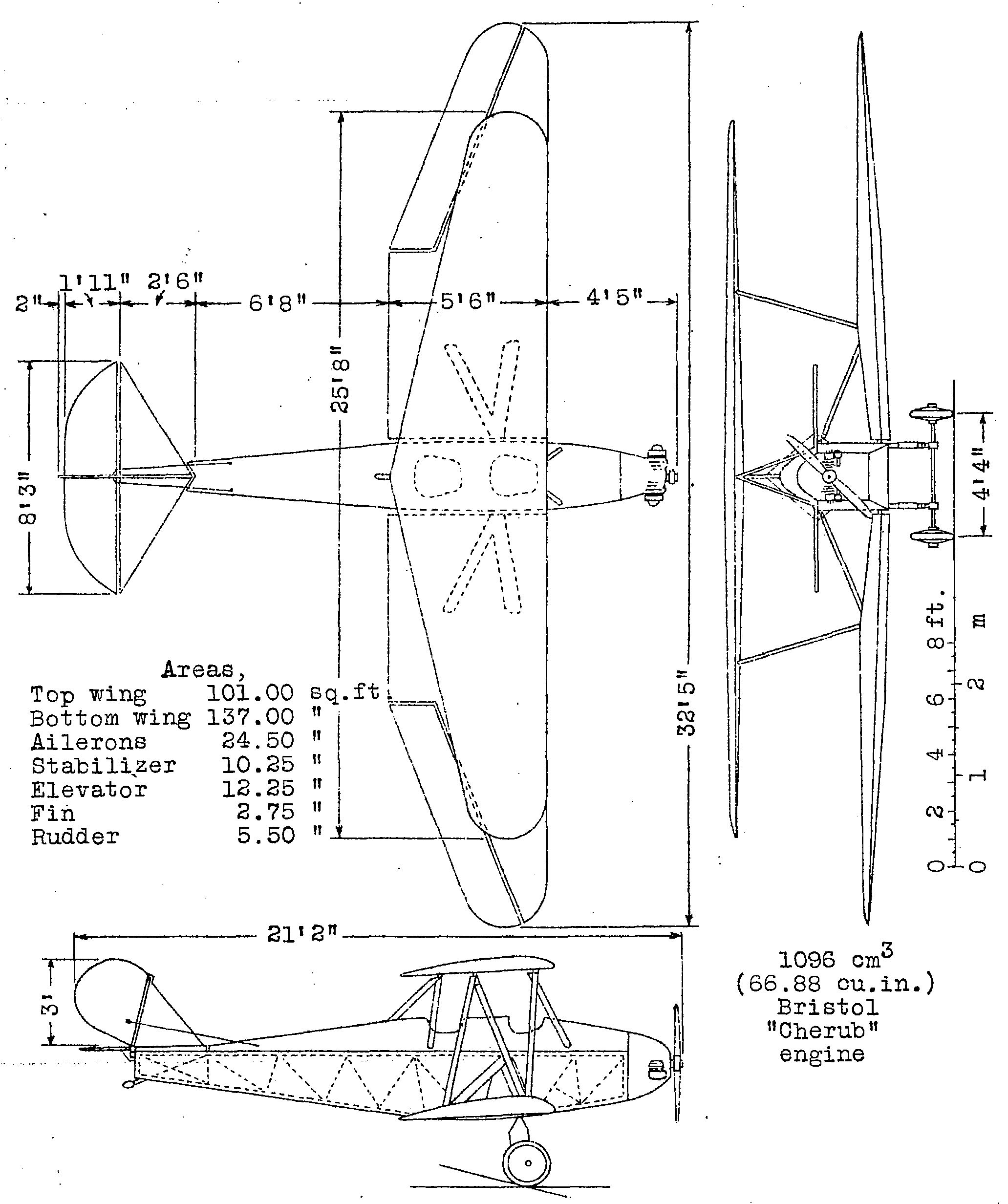
Parnall Pixie IIIa 3-view drawing from NACA-TM-289

Data from Flight 25 October 1923, pp.653-4

General characteristics

- Crew: 1
- Length: 18 ft 0 in (5.47 m)
- Wingspan: 17 ft 10 in (5.44 m)
- Wing area: 60 sq ft (5.57 m^{2})
- Empty weight: 279 lb (127 kg)
- Gross weight: 460 lb (209 kg)
- Powerplant: 1 × 750 cc Douglas flat twin, air cooled

Performance

- Maximum speed: 81 mph (130 km/h, 70 kn)
