= Lympne light aircraft trials =

Aircraft competition in England, 1920s

Coordinates: 51°4.8′N 1°1′E

The Lympne Light Aircraft Trials were held to encourage the development of practical light aircraft for private ownership, with a strong but not exclusive emphasis on fuel economy. They were held in 1923, 1924 and 1926. Each year saw different restrictions on engine size, framed initially in terms of capacity and then weight. The Daily Mail newspaper provided cash prizes throughout though the initiating donation came from the Duke of Sutherland. The Air Ministry were prize givers in the 1924 event. The trials were held at Lympne in Kent, England.

== The background ==
The Lympne events had their origin in the post-World War I state of aviation in Britain and in Germany. Military aircraft production stopped immediately after the war ended. In Britain there were large stocks of surplus aircraft available at low prices, making it hard for manufacturers to develop new models. Airlines were only slowly emerging, largely using converted military aeroplanes and having not found a certain economic model. The old fighters, though effective for barnstorming were not economical or practical enough for the private owner.

In Germany the manufacture of powered aircraft was forbidden under the terms of the Treaty of Versailles, but glider development was allowed. In 1921 a glider competition was held in the Rhön mountains, and in mid-August 1922 another was held at the Wasserkuppe. The 1922 prize of 100,000 marks was won by a flight of 66 minutes, demonstrating the possibilities of engineless flight. In response, the Daily Mail offered a prize of £1,000 to the pilot making the longest flight in England. The Royal Aero Club chose Itford Hill on the South Downs just east of Brighton as a venue and the event was arranged for 16–21 October 1922. This gave contestants just six weeks to design and build their gliders, or to bring them from Europe. Thirteen gliders competed with each other and the autumn weather. The best flight by an Englishman was that made by Fred Raynham in a Handasyde aircraft, lasting 113 minutes, but the Frenchman Alexis Maneyrol did better in his Peyret tandem monoplane, staying up for a world record 201 minutes to win the prize. Given this demonstration of long duration unpowered flight it is not surprising that people began to consider the possibilities of glider-like aircraft, fitted with small engines, as sports aircraft for the private flyer. The first Lympne meeting the following year and its slightly earlier counterpart in Vauville near Cherbourg, France, were the result both of these ideas and a desire to build an aircraft which would satisfy the needs of private fliers and foster private aviation. Unfortunately, in the opinion of many, both at the time and later, the restrictions imposed resulted in aircraft that had too-small engines, wheels that were too thin and of small diameter and engines which, though under powered, were too heavy relative to the often fragile, light-weight frames in which they were housed. C. G. Grey, editor of 'The Aeroplane' at the time devoted two issues to "a four-page long diatribe" to the failures of the 1924 event and the author of 'The Lympne Trials' speaks of "a clear failure to understand what a private pilot or a flying club might need as a training aeroplane". Nevertheless, the trials did serve to stimulate public and industry interest in private aviation after the first world war and certainly exercised the ingenuity of designers to the maximum in complying with the restrictions placed upon them.

== Venue and organisation ==
Lympne Aerodrome is just west of the village of Lympne, on top of old sea cliffs near the coast and about 3 miles (5 km) WNW of the Kent port of Hythe. The events were organised and administrated by the Royal Aero Club.

== 1923 ==
The first trial was held 8–13 October 1923. The official proper name was the motor-glider competition. The Duke of Sutherland, at that time Under-Secretary of State for Air got the competition moving, offering a prize of £500 for the most economical British aircraft. The Daily Mail offered a similar economy prize of £1000 for a flight of more than 50 miles over a 12.5-mile triangular course, powered by an engine of less than 750 cc capacity but for an aircraft from any nation. As a result, the competition began to be referred to as the Daily Mail Motor Glider Competition. Rules were few, but the newspaper's inclusion of a capacity limit with its generous prize was adopted by all entrants. Since a single-seat aircraft was bound to be lighter and more economical than a two-seater, all entrants were single-seaters.

The original intention was to fill the aircraft with one gallon of fuel and see how far they got. Seeing that this would lead to aircraft retrieval problems, the organisers decided that all flights must begin and end at Lypmne. Instead, each was fuelled over a gallon by a standard amount, landing when they judged they had insufficient fuel for another 12.5 miles. If they had used more than one gallon, the calculated consumption was pro rata; if they had used less than one gallon the consumption was nevertheless based on one gallon used.

Before an aircraft could enter the fuel economy test it was required to pass a demonstration of portability, called the transport test. Each aircraft had to prove it was capable of going through a standard field gate and then be wheeled along a country road for a mile using not more than two men. Because this limited the width of the aircraft to 7 ft 6in then the designs all featured either detachable or folding wings.

Also competed for were the £500 Abdulla Prize, donated by the Abdulla Tobacco Co. for the greatest speed over two laps of the same circuit and £150 each from the Society of Motor Manufacturers and Traders and the British Cycle and Motor Cycle Manufacturers and Trade Unions for the greatest number of completed circuits during the whole competition. Sir Charles Wakefield of Wakefield Oil (Castrol) offered £100 for the machine that attained the greatest altitude. These were large sums of money at a time when £80 would buy a sailplane in Germany. The object of the competition was to produce a motor glider that cost no more than £100.

The 1923 entrants were:

| Competition Number | Registration | Type | Engine* | Pilot | Notes |
|---|---|---|---|---|---|
| No. 1 | | Avro 558 biplane | | B&H (Grigg) | entered by Grigg Motor and Engineering Probably did not attend |
| No. 2 | G-EBGN | Gnosspelius Gull | Tomtit | John Lankester Parker | Entered by Major O.T. Gnosspelius and J.L. Parker |
| No. 3 | G-EBNV | English Electric Wren | ABC flat twin | Maurice Wright | Entered by the English Electric Company |
| No. 4 | None | English Electric Wren | ABC flat twin | Walter H. Longton | Entered by the English Electric Company |
| No. 5 | None | Avro 558 | B&H V-twin | Bert Hinkler | Entered by A.V.Roe & Co. |
| No. 6 | None | Avro 560 | Tomtit | Bert Hinkler | Entered by A.V.Roe & Co. |
| No. 7 | G-EBHU | Gloster Gannet | Carden | Larry Carter | Entered by the Gloster Aircraft Company. |
| No. 8 | G-EBHX | de Havilland DH.53 | 750cc Douglas | Capt Geoffrey de Havilland and Capt Hubert Broad | Entered by the de Havilland Aircraft Company. |
| No. 9 | G-EBKM | Parnall Pixie I | 500cc Douglas | Norman Macmillan | Entered by George Parnall and Company. |
| No. 10 | G-EBHN | Vickers Viget | 750cc Douglas | Stan Cockerell | Entered by Vickers Limited. |
| No. 11 | G-EBHW | Avro 558 | 500cc Douglas | Harold Hamersley | Entered by G.S. Bush and H.A. Hammersley. |
| No. 12 | G-EBHZ | de Havilland DH.53 | 750cc Douglas | Harold Hemming | Entered by A.S. Butler. |
| No. 13 | | Handasyde Monoplane | 750cc Douglas | Fred Raynham | Entered by the pilot. |
| No. 14 | G-EBHS | RAE Aero Club Hurricane | 600cc Douglas | George Bulman | Entered by the Royal Aircraft Establishment Aero Club. |
| No. 15 | | Peyret Monoplane | 4-cylinder Sergant | Alexis Maneyrol | French, entered by Louis Peyret. |
| No. 16 | O-BAFH | Poncelot Vivette Monoplane | 16 hp 4-cylinder Sergant | Baron Georges Kervyn de Lettenhove | Belgian. As No. 21, but mahogany covered fuselage and larger area wings, entered by Jean B. Richard. |
| No. 17 | G-EBIL | ANEC I | Tomtit | "Jimmy" J.H. James | Entered by the Addlestone Aeronautical Association. |
| No. 18 | G-EBHR | ANEC I | Tomtit | Maurice Piercy | Entered by Hubert Blundell. |
| No. 19 | None | Gnosspelius Gull | Tomtit | Rex Stocken | Entered by Major O.T. Gnosspelius and J.L. Parker |
| No. 20 | | Kingwell Tandem Monoplane | ABC | H. Sykes | did not attend, entered by P.W. Kingwell. |
| No. 21 | O-BAFG | Poncelot Castar Monoplane | 16 hp 4-cylinder Sergant | V. Simonet | Belgian. As No. 16 but fabric covered fuselage and smaller area wings, entered by G.A. de Ro. |
| No. 22 | | Peyret Monoplane | Douglas | Alexis Maneyrol | probably did not attend, entered by Louis Peyret. |
| No. 23 | J7233 | Sayers-Handley Page H.P.22 | 500cc Douglas | A.G. Pointing and J.T. Jeyes | entered by pilots. |
| No. 24 | G-EBKN | Parnall Pixie II | 750cc Douglas | Norman Macmillan | the same aircraft as No.9 with shorter span wings and a more powerful engine. Entered by the George Parnall and Company. |
| No. 25 | None | Sayers-Handley Page H.P.22 | 400cc ABC engine | C. Barnard | like No. 23 with a different nose shape and engine Entered by Vernon Bradshaw. |
| No. 26 | J7265 | Sayers-Handley Page H.P.23 | Tomtit | Gordon Olley | Entered by the Handley Page company. |
| No. 27 | G-EBHQ | Salmon Tandem Monoplane | 3 1/2hp Bradshaw motorcycle engine | Cecil Bouchier | did not attend, entered by Percy Salmon. |
| No. 28 | | Falcon Monoplane | JAP | | not completed |

- The engine referred to here as the Tomtit was the early, crudely adapted motorcycle engine. The Tomtit was a more refined aeronautical adaptation.

Prize winners The Duke of Sutherland's prize of £500 and the Daily Mail prize of £1,000 were put together and divided between the English Electric Wren (No. 4) flown by Flt Lt Longton and the ANEC Monoplane (No. 17) flown by Mr Jimmy James. Despite very different engine capacities (398 cc on the Wren and 700 cc on the ANEC), both returned 87.5 mpg (31.0 km/litre).

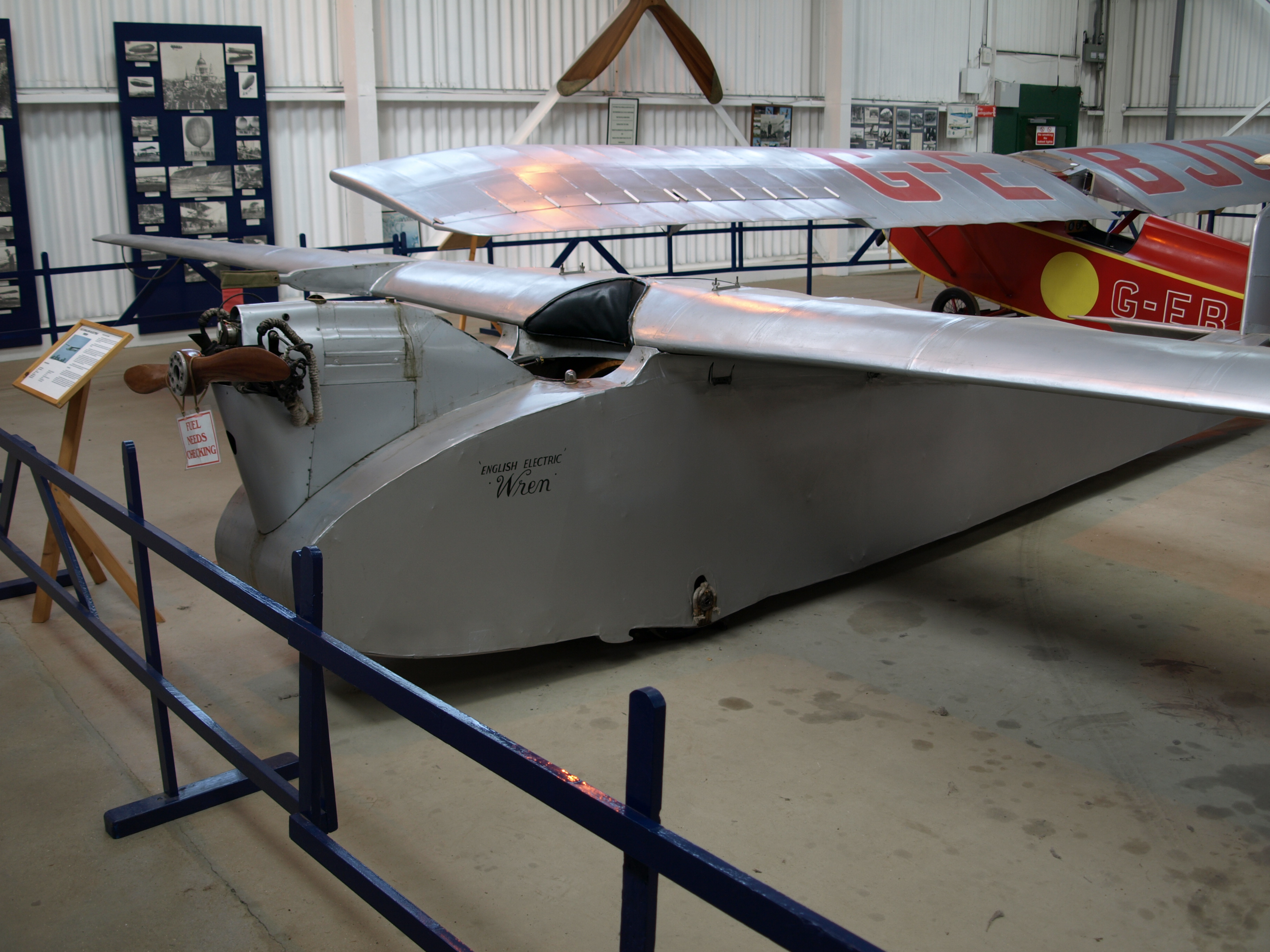
Joint winner in 1923, this Wren contains parts from both of those competing at Lympne. It still flies.

The Parnall Pixie II (No. 24), flown by Capt Macmillan won the Abdulla speed prize of £500 with a speed of 76.1 mph (122.5 km/h). ANEC No.17, flown this time by Mr Maurice Piercey also won the £200 altitude prize from Sir Charles Wakefield with a height of 14,400 feet (4,390 m).

The two £150 prizes for maximum distance covered went to the Avro 560 (No.6) flown by Bert Hinkler, which completed 80 laps or 1,000 miles (1,609 km). A take-off and landing competition with a £100 prize was frustrated by the gusty conditions and the prize went instead to Avro 558 No.11 flown by Harold Hamersley to an altitude of 13,850 ft (4,221 m).

However Alexis Maneyrol died on the final day during his second attempt on the altitude record, when his Peyret monoplane suffered lift strut failure. The banquet, which was to have concluded the Lympne event, was cancelled as a mark of respect.

The Wren No. 4 still flies with The Shuttleworth Collection, with the help of some parts from No. 3. The Vivette No. 16 hangs from the roof in the Brussels Air Museum, configured as a glider.

== 1924 ==
The 1924 trial, properly called the Two-Seater Dual Control Light Aeroplane Competition was held from 27 September to 4 October 1924 also at Lympne Aerodrome. The rules, issued in February 1924 required competing aircraft to have engines with a capacity of no more than 1,100 cc, to have full dual controls and one or two airspeed visible from either cockpit. All tests were to be flown with a load of 340 lb (154 kg), excluding fuel but including the pilot's weight.

The elimination trials, held on Sunday 28 September were not expected to be as challenging as they turned out. There was a transport, store and reassemble test which involved folding or dismantling the wings, moving the aircraft a short distance and housing in a shed 10 ft (3 m) wide, then reversing the process. This had to be done by only two people. A flying test followed, a flight of one lap plus a figure of eight to be made from each cockpit in turn.

The competition proper, starting the next day awarded points on performance in four different tests: high speed, low speed, distance required to take off and clear an obstacle and length of landing run. The total time in the air during the competition was also logged.

The Air Ministry offered a £2,000 prize for the winner and £1,000 for the runner-up. In addition, there was a £500 prize for the best combined take-off and landing performance from the Duke of Sutherland, with £100 for the runner-up and a £300 reliability prize from the Society of Motor Manufacturers and the British Cycle and Motor-cycle Manufacturers' and Traders' Union, awarded to the aircraft that flew the most laps during the week.

The 1924 entrants were:

| Competition Number | Registration | Type | Engine | Pilot | Notes |
|---|---|---|---|---|---|
| No. 1 | G-EBJK | Bristol Brownie | Cherub | Cyril Uwins | |
| No. 2 | G-EBJL | Bristol Brownie | Cherub | | did not attend |
| No. 3 | G-EBKC | Cranwell CLA.2 | Cherub | Nicholas Comper | |
| No. 4 | G-EBJJ | Beardmore Wee Bee | Cherub | Maurice Piercey | |
| No. 5 | G-EBIY | Westland Woodpigeon | Cherub | | did not attend |
| No. 6 | G-EBJV | Westland Woodpigeon | Cherub | Gaskell | |
| No. 7 | G-EBJO | ANEC II | Anzani | | |
| No. 8 | G-EBJU | Short Satellite | Cherub | John Lankester Parker | |
| No. 9 | G-EBJP | Supermarine Sparrow | Thrush | Henry Biard | |
| No. 10 | G-EBKP | Avro Avis | Cherub | Bert Hinkler | |
| No. 11 | G-EBKP | Avro Avis | Thrush | Bert Hinkler | Avro entered the same Avis twice to have a choice of engines. No.10 flew in the trials. |
| No. 12 | G-EBKD | Blackburn Bluebird | Thrush | | did not attend |
| No. 14 | G-EBMB | Hawker Cygnet I | Anzani | Walter Longton | |
| No. 15 | G-EBJH | Hawker Cygnet II | Scorpion | Fred Raynham | |
| No. 16 | G-EBJF | Vickers Vagabond | Cherub | H.J. Payn | |
| No. 17 | G-EBJG | Parnall Pixie III biplane | Cherub | | Not flown in competition |
| No. 18 | G-EBJG | Parnall Pixie III monoplane | Cherub | Frank Courtney | Same aircraft as No. 17, without upper second wing, flown in competition |
| No. 19 | G-EBKK | Parnall Pixie IIIa biplane | Cherub | Sholto Douglas | Given Type No.IIIa, flown in competition |

Only eight of these survived the elimination trials to proceed to the trials proper. The unexpectedly high loss rate was broadly due to underdeveloped engines and a rushed preparation of airframes. The Vickers Vagabond, for example arrived by road unflown. The successful machines were No.s 1, 3, 4, 5, 14, 15, 18 and 19. Pixies No.s 17 and 18 were the same aircraft, configurable as either a monoplane or a biplane, but only flown as No.18, in monoplane configuration. This dropped out of the trials on Tuesday 30 September, leaving only seven aircraft to end with officially recognised performances.

Prize winners The Air Ministry first prize was won by Maurice Piercey flying the Beardmore "Wee Bee" (No. 4). The runner up was the Bristol Brownie (No. 1) flown by Cyril Unwins. These were the only two aircraft reliable enough to complete the high speed tests, reaching 70.1 mph (112.8 km/h) and 65.2 mph (104.9 km/h) respectively. The Brownie also won the £500 take-off and landing prize, with the Cygnet II (No.15) running up. The slow Cranwell CLA.2 (No.3) went the furthest and flew for longest, winning the £300 reliability prize. It covered 762.5 miles (1,227 km) in almost 18 hours flying.

Cygnet No. 14 is exhibited in non-flying condition at the RAF Museum, Cosford, Shropshire.

== 1926 ==
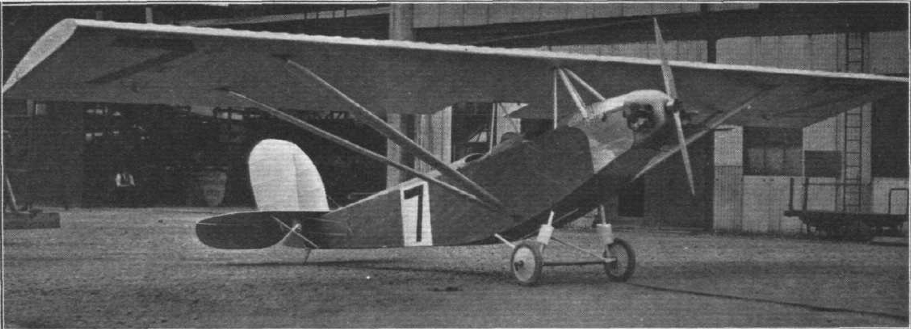
Supermarine Sparrow II, G-EBJP; marked as number "7" for the 1926 trials

The 1926 trials were held at Lympne in September 1926. The aim of the competition was to encourage the design of practical two seaters, which as in 1924 were to have full dual control. Rather than limit engine capacity, the rules set a maximum engine weight of 170 lb (77.1 kg). For the first time in the Lympne trials, all aircraft had to be all British. This requirement, together with the weight limit severely limited the choice of engines. Air Ministry interest had waned and they put up no prize money, but the Daily Mail offered £5,000 in all, £3,000 to the winner, £1,500 to the runner-up and £500 for third place. A single "figure of merit" determined position, the ratio of the useful load carried, unchanged throughout the trials to the mass of petrol used over the total 1,994 miles (3,208 km) flown. The preliminary eliminating trials began on Friday 10th, and the trial proper on Sunday 12th.

The 1926 entrants were:

| Competition Number | Registration | Type | Engine | Pilot | Notes |
|---|---|---|---|---|---|
| No. 1 | G-EBKD | Blackburn Bluebird | Genet | Walter Longton | entered by Blackburn |
| No. 2 | G-EBOU | de Havilland DH.60 Moth | Genet | Hubert Broad | entered by de Havilland |
| No. 3 | G-EBJK | Bristol Brownie | Cherub | Cyril Uwins | entered by Bristol Aeroplane Company |
| No. 4 | G-EBJH | Hawker Cygnet | Cherub | J.S. Chick and R.L. Ragg | entered by the Aero Club of the RAE |
| No. 5 | G-EBNL | RAE Sirocco | | | never completed |
| No. 6 | G-EBMB | Hawker Cygnet | Cherub | George Bulman | entered by T.O.M. Sopwith & F. Sigrist |
| No. 7 | G-EBJP | Supermarine Sparrow II | Cherub | Henry Biard | entered by Supermarine |
| No. 8 | G-EBOO | Halton Mayfly | Cherub | | entered by Halton Aero Club; not completed until 1927 |
| No. 9 | G-EBOV | Avro Avian | Genet | Bert Hinkler | entered by Avro |
| No. 10 | G-EBKP | Avro Avis | Cherub | Sholto Douglas | entered by Avro |
| No. 11 | G-EBPB | Cranwell CLA.4 | Pobjoy P | | entered by the Aero Club of the RAE; Pobjoy P failed tests |
| No. 12 | G-EBPC | Cranwell CLA.4 | Cherub | Nicholas Comper | entered by the Aero Club of the RAE |
| No. 13 | G-EBPI | ANEC Missel Thrush | Thrush | G.L.P. Henderson | entered by H.W. Martin |
| No. 14 | G-EBJG | Parnall Pixie III | Cherub | Frank Courtney | entered by Parnall |
| No. 15 | G-EBJU | Short Satellite | Scorpion | John Lankester Parker | entered by the Severn Aero Club |
| No. 16 | G-EBJV | Westland Woodpigeon | Scorpion | Ritchie and Park | entered by the Severn Aero Club |

Competitors No.s 5, 8 and 11 did not arrive in time for the elimination trials. The Missel Thrush did, but was out even before the start of the elimination test, badly damaged in an accident begun with undercarriage failure. The elimination trials did not reduce the field as severely as in 1924, but three aircraft (No.1, 12 and 15) were disqualified after suffering undercarriage failures in the flying tests. These tests involved a pair of five-minute flights over the airfield, including a figure of eight, the first flown from one cockpit and the second from the other. All the entrants passed the weight checks, the dismantle-house-reassemble test, similar to that undertaken in 1924 and the more demanding take off test.

So on Sunday, nine machines started the trials proper. On each of the six days, competitors flew several laps of courses mostly involving towns or landmarks along or near the Kent and Sussex coastline, and usually involving either three or six laps totalling between 300 and 400 miles. Friday's course was an exception, a two lap flight on a 106-mile circuit from Lympne to the south London airport at Croydon. By Thursday morning the field had been reduced to four, the two Cygnets with No.6 leading, followed by the Brownie and then the Pixie. Two days more flying left this order unchanged; final figures of merit were 1.105, 0.907, 0.850 and 0.773 respectively.

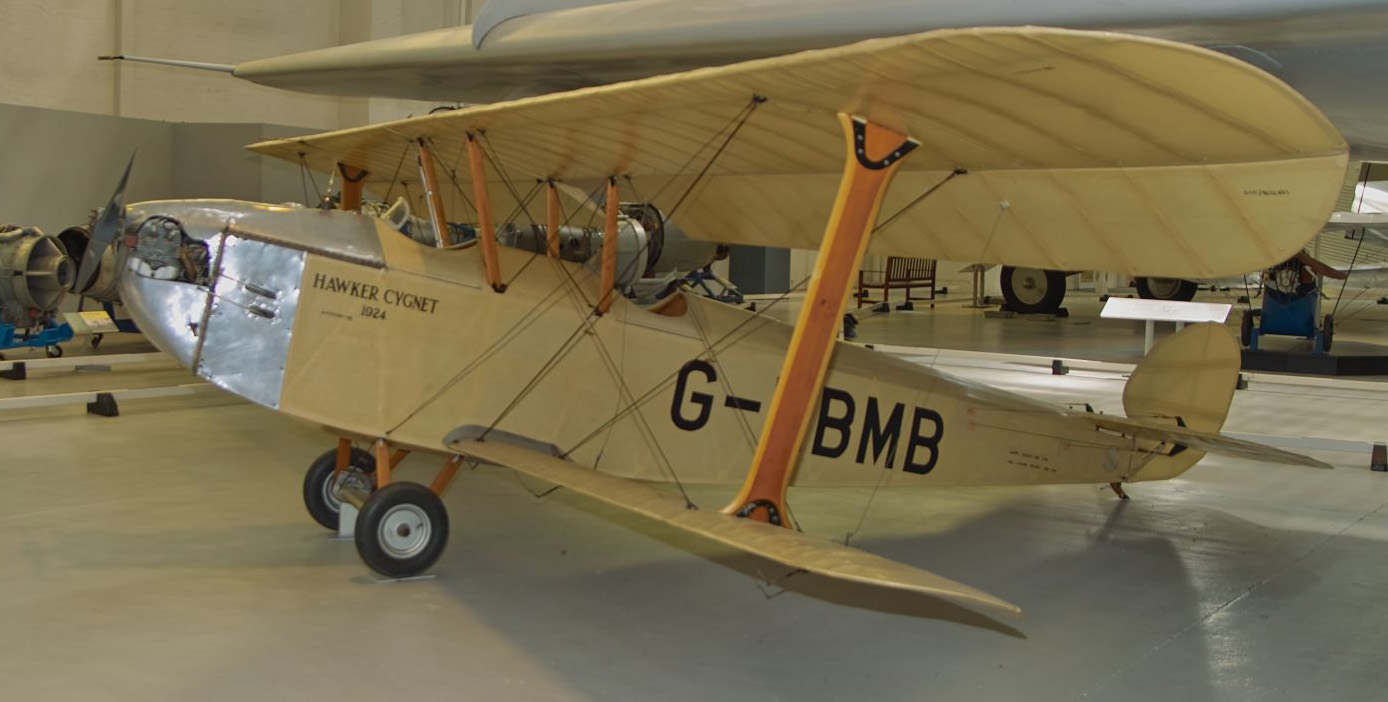
The 1926 winner, Hawker Cygnet G-EBMB, in 2008

Prize winners So the factory entered Hawker Cygnet, flown by George Bulman took the £3,000 winner's prize, the RAE Aero Club Cygnet flown by J.S. Chick and R.L. Ragg the £1,500 for second place and the Bristol Brownie £500 for third. All three aircraft used the Cherub engine. If placings had been determined by fuel consumed rather than the figure of merit, the order would have been unchanged, and Bulman flew his Cygnet significantly faster (68.36 mph or 101.0 km/h) over the 1,994 miles of the course than anyone else.
