= Handley Page H.P.22 =

H.P. 22 & 23

General information
- Type: Light single-seat sport
- National origin: United Kingdom
- Manufacturer: Handley Page
- Designer: W.H.Sayers
- Number built: 3

History
- First flight: 1923

The Handley Page H.P.22 and H.P.23 were single-seat sport monoplanes produced for the 1923 Lympne light aircraft trials. They were not successful.

== Development ==
With prizes worth a total of £2,150, the Lympne light aircraft competition of October 1923 attracted 28 entries including the Avro 558, de Havilland Humming Bird and Gloster Gannet. Handley Page provided three contestants, at that time without a company type letter but bearing the competition numbers 23, 25 and 26. These were designed by W.H Sayers, technical editor of The Aeroplane and owed much to a glider that he, along with Frank Courtney and Maurice Wright had designed and built for the glider competition held at Itford Hill the previous year. In the later 1920s, when Handley Page began using the familiar H.P. numbering system they retrospectively named the initially similar no.23 and 25 the H.P.22 and no.26 became the H.P.23.

As originally completed, all three aircraft had much in common. They had almost constant chord wings that carried ailerons fitted with slots for low speed control. The fuselage was of square cross-section, with the underside tapering towards the tail. There was no fixed tailplane, only an elevator, and both types had a fixed triangular fin. On the H.P.22s this carried a rectangular, unbalanced rudder, but the H.P.23's rudder was rounded on the trailing edge and horn-balanced. The open cockpit was ahead of the wings and the undercarriage had two small wheels, mounted inboard on the fuselage on the H.P.22 and outboard on the H.P.23. The main differences between the two types came about because the H.P.23 was designed for the speed prizes rather than those for flight duration. It therefore had a much shorter span of 20 ft (6.1 m) compared with 36 ft 6 in (11.13 m) for the H.P.22. This wing had full span leading edge slots and camber changing flaps. Both types had their engine mounted on a pylon immediately ahead of the pilot. The H.P.22 used a 397 cc ABC flat-twin and the H.P.23 a 750 cc Blackburne V-twin, the latter requiring slight changes to the pylon and nose.

No.23 proved impossible to get airborne, even when the little ABC was replaced with a 500 cc Douglas. No. 25 was therefore reworked: the wing was lowered to shoulder height with its incidence increased to 7°, the ABC engine was faired in and the cockpit faired over apart from two small viewing ports, giving a smooth nose profile. Thus modified, with a lightweight pilot and bungee-cord takeoff assistance, allowed under the rules, no.25 took part in the competition though without success. The H.P.23 could not be completed in time for the competition. It was later bought by the Air Ministry and moved to Martlesham, though it never flew there.

== Specifications (H.P.22) ==
Data from Barnes & James 1987, pp. 444

General characteristics

- Crew: one
- Length: 21 ft 0 in (6.4 m)
- Wingspan: 36 ft 6 in (11.13 m)
- Wing area: 160 sq ft (14.9 m^{2})
- Empty weight: 249 lb (113 kg)
- Gross weight: 430 lb (195 kg)
- Powerplant: 1 × ABC 397 cm^{3} (24.2 cu in) flat twin, 8 hp (6.0 kW)
