= Gribovsky G-5 =

General information
- Type: Single seat light sports aircraft
- National origin: Soviet Union
- Designer: Vladislav Gribovsky

History
- First flight: 1928

The Gribovsky G-5 (Russian: Грибовский Г-5) was a small, low powered Russian single seat sports aircraft from the late 1920s.

== Design and development ==
The G-5 was the first powered Gribovsky aircraft to fly; his first three designs were gliders and the first powered type, the Gribovsky G-4, though built, was not flown. Structurally all of his aircraft were wooden and several had smooth, rounded monocoque fuselages. That of the G-5 was oval in cross-section, with a single, open cockpit. Its low, cantilever wing had a high aspect ratio (9.0) for the time and the rear surfaces were also high aspect ratio. All flying surfaces were unbraced, keeping the G-5 aerodynamically clean, and the only external bracing was for the main landing gear.

The G-5 was powered by a small British V-twin, the 18 hp (13 kW) Blackburne Tomtit, an engine which had been installed in several of the aircraft that competed in the first Lympne light aircraft trials of 1923, mostly running inverted.

== Specifications ==
Data from Gunston (1995) p.77

General characteristics

- Crew: One
- Length: 5.0 m (16 ft 5 in)
- Wingspan: 9.0 m (29 ft 6 in)
- Wing area: 9.0 m^{2} (97 sq ft)
- Empty weight: 170 kg (375 lb)
- Gross weight: 270 kg (595 lb)
- Fuel capacity: 20 kg (44 lb)
- Powerplant: 1 × Blackburne Tomtit air-cooled V-twin, 13 kW (18 hp)

Performance

- Maximum speed: 130 km/h (81 mph, 70 kn)
- Range: 350 km (220 mi, 190 nmi) in 3 hr
- Service ceiling: 4,500 m (14,800 ft)
- Landing speed: 60 km/h (37 mph)
