= Beardmore Wee Bee =

Wee Bee
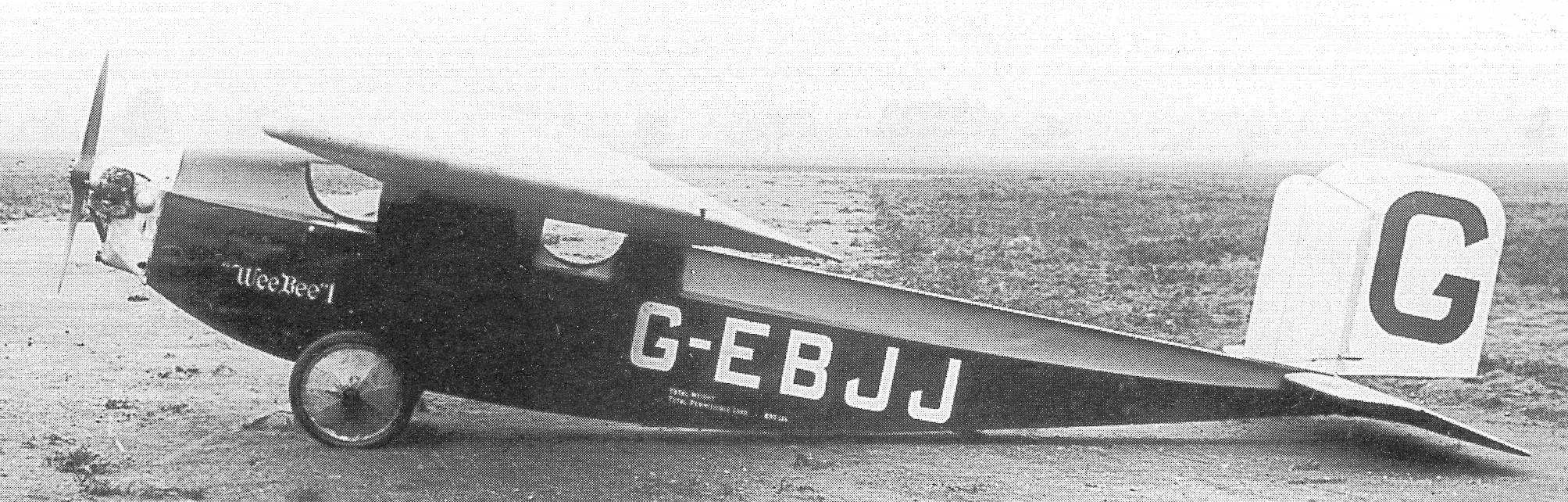

General information
- Type: Two seater sports plane
- National origin: United Kingdom
- Manufacturer: William Beardmore &Co,, Ltd, Dalmuir, Glasgow, Dumbartonshire
- Designer: W.S. Shackleton
- Number built: 1

History
- First flight: mid 1924

The Beardmore Wee Bee was a single-engined monoplane built only once and specifically for the Lympne two-seat light aircraft trials held in the United Kingdom in 1924. This plane won the major prize.

== Design and development ==
The Beardmore W.B.XXIV Wee Bee I (Note: It often appears under this name, though W.B.XXIV was a constructor's number referring to that airframe; and the I after Bee turned out to be optimistic as only one was built and there were no variants) was the company's winning entrant to the Lympne Aerodrome light aeroplane trials of 1924. The competition rules were framed to encourage more robust designs than those that had competed as "motor-gliders" at Lympne the previous year; they were to be single-engined two-seaters, with engine capacities up to 1,1000 cc allowed. The total prize money was £3,600.; the first prize £2,000.

The Wee Bee was a high-wing monoplane, its aerodynamically thick wing divided at the centre and braced, close to the fuselage, by pairs of parallel struts to the lower longerons. The wings were of two spar construction with plywood skinning between the two spars out as far as the bracing; outboard, only the leading edges were plywood covered, with fabric elsewhere. The outboard ailerons were mounted on false spars as usual. In plan, the wings were almost rectangular, with an aspect ratio of about 5.5.

The fuselage was built up on six spruce longerons, with bulkheads (formers) of spruce and three-ply. Rather than the usual half round deck on the top of the fuselage, the Wee Bee's decking was concave as it reached the flat fuselage sides, making for a better view from the two tandem cockpits. These were positioned at the leading edge and just behind mid-chord, fitted with dual controls. Both cockpits were semi-enclosed and faired neatly into the upper fuselage/ wing surface. The front one was entered by lifting up a small hinged part of the leading edge, which was locked down for flight; this gave excellent visibility with the help of the "hollow ground" decking. The aft cockpit had a roof hatch with a transparent celluloid window in the upper wings, with good views though openings in the sides below the wing. The 32 hp (24 kW) Bristol Cherub flat twin engine was hung from a duralumin sheet bracket fixed to the engine bulkhead and positioned below with a pair of duralumin tubes, themselves braced to the lower longerons with steel tubes. It was enclosed in a smooth, streamlined cowling, with the upper cylinder heads protruding for cooling.

The tail unit of the Wee Bee was fairly conventional. Fin and tailplane were both integral with the fuselage and narrow in chord, carrying wider control surfaces. Both horizontal and vertical surfaces were rather rectangular, but the rudder had a noticeable horn balance. The main undercarriage was very simple, with two wheels mounted on a bent chrome-nickel alloy tube which passed through the fuselage bottom. This placed the wheels well clear of the fuselage horizontally - the track was 3 ft 9 in (1.14 m) - but left the Wee Bee sitting close to the ground. Landing loads were absorbed by elastic axle bending.

== Operational history ==
The only Wee Bee first flew in the late summer of 1924, ready for the Lympne competition. The preliminary trial for this were held at the weekend of 27–8 September, where, surprisingly only seven of the initial nineteen entrants did enough to go to the competition proper. (Note: Flight says six, but in a later note the following week noted one of the Parnall Pixies had not dropped out with engine trouble) As well as the Wee Bee, the other competitors were the Bristol Brownie, two Hawker Cygnets, the Parnall Pixie, the Cranwell CLA.2 and the Westland Woodpigeon. The Wee Bee was flown by Maurice Piercey. (Note: Jackson calls him "Pearcy")

The aircraft were given marks for four tasks: speed over two sets of five laps, slow speed flying and take off and landing distances. Only the Wee Bee and the Brownie, both Cherub engined, had the reliability to complete the speed tests, in which the Wee Bee achieved 70.1 mph (112.8 km/h), about 5 mph faster than the Bristol. It flew at just under 40 mph (64 km/h) and took off to clear a 6 ft (1.83 m) barrier with a run of 705 ft (215 m). Given the Wee Bee's clean aerodynamics it was not surprising to find it took to greatest distance to pull up at landing; wheel brakes were not fitted. Despite the long landing, the Wee Bee ended the competition well ahead in marks of the Brownie, its nearest rival, winning the Air Ministry first prize of £2,000.

At Lympne in 1924 the Wee Bee flew as "No.4", but at the Royal Aero Club meeting of August 1925, also held at Lympne, it appeared as G-EBJJ. At that meeting, with an aluminium front cockpit hatch in place of the earlier wooden one, it won the light two-seater race and came fourth in the Grosvenor Cup, both times piloted by A. N. Kingswill. In December 1933 it was sold to Percy Parker of Warrnambool, Victoria, Australia, where it was registered as VH-URJ. Mr. Parker sold it prior to 1939. It flew until 1939 and was then stored, but probably flew again a few years after the end of World War II., though exact dates are uncertain.

== Specifications ==
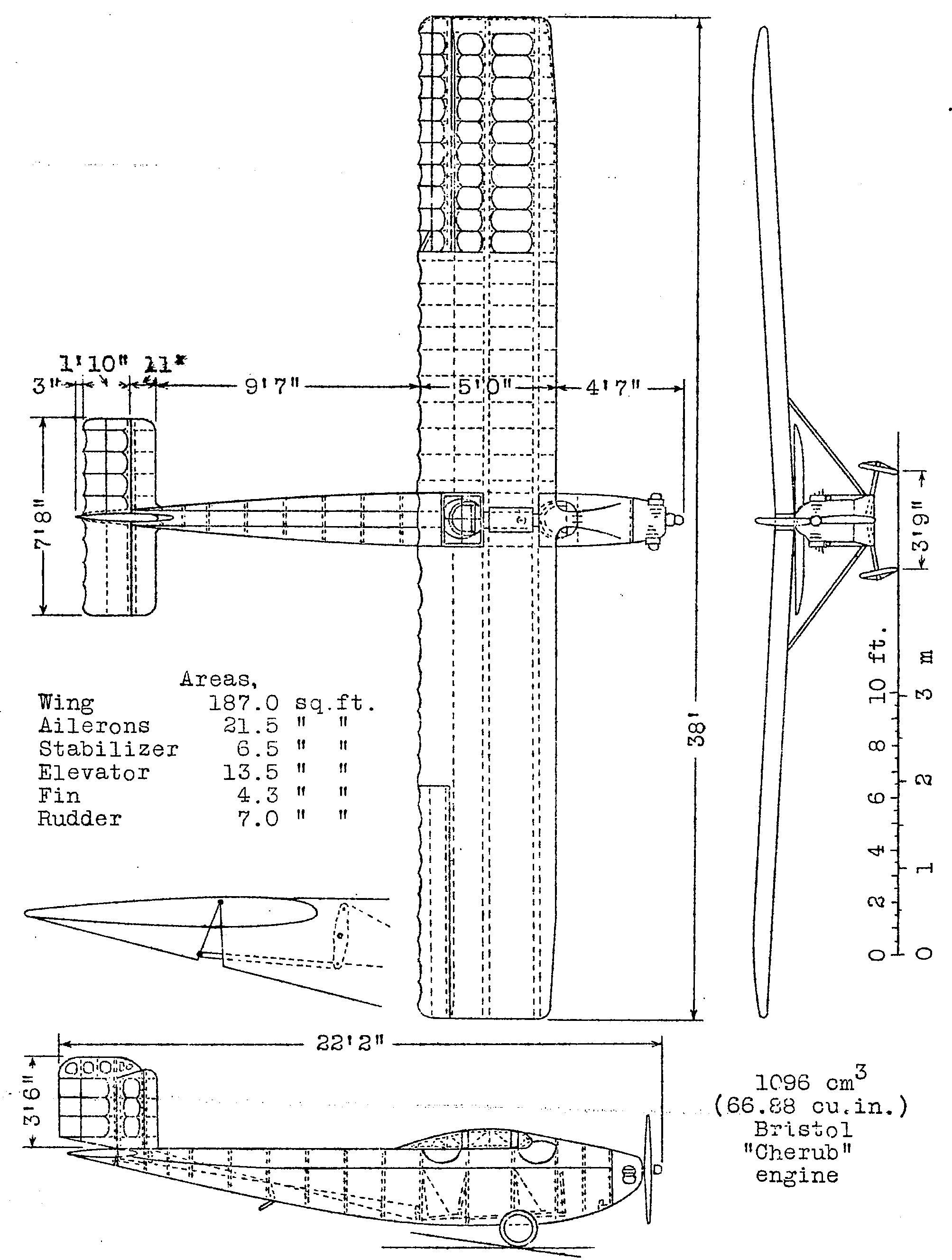
Beardmore Wee Bee I 3-view drawing from NACA-TM-289

Data from Flight 25 September 1924 p.592

General characteristics

- Crew: 2
- Length: 22 ft 2 in (6.76 m)
- Wingspan: 38 ft 0 in (11.58 m)
- Height: 7 ft 2 in (2.18 m)
- Wing area: 208.5 sq ft (19.37 m^{2}) including ailerons
- Empty weight: 465 lb (211 kg)
- Gross weight: 840 lb (381 kg)
- Powerplant: 1 × Bristol Cherub I air cooled flat twin , 32 hp (24 kW)

Performance

- Maximum speed: 87 mph (140 km/h, 76 kn)
