= Blackburne Tomtit =

1920s British aircraft piston engine

Tomtit
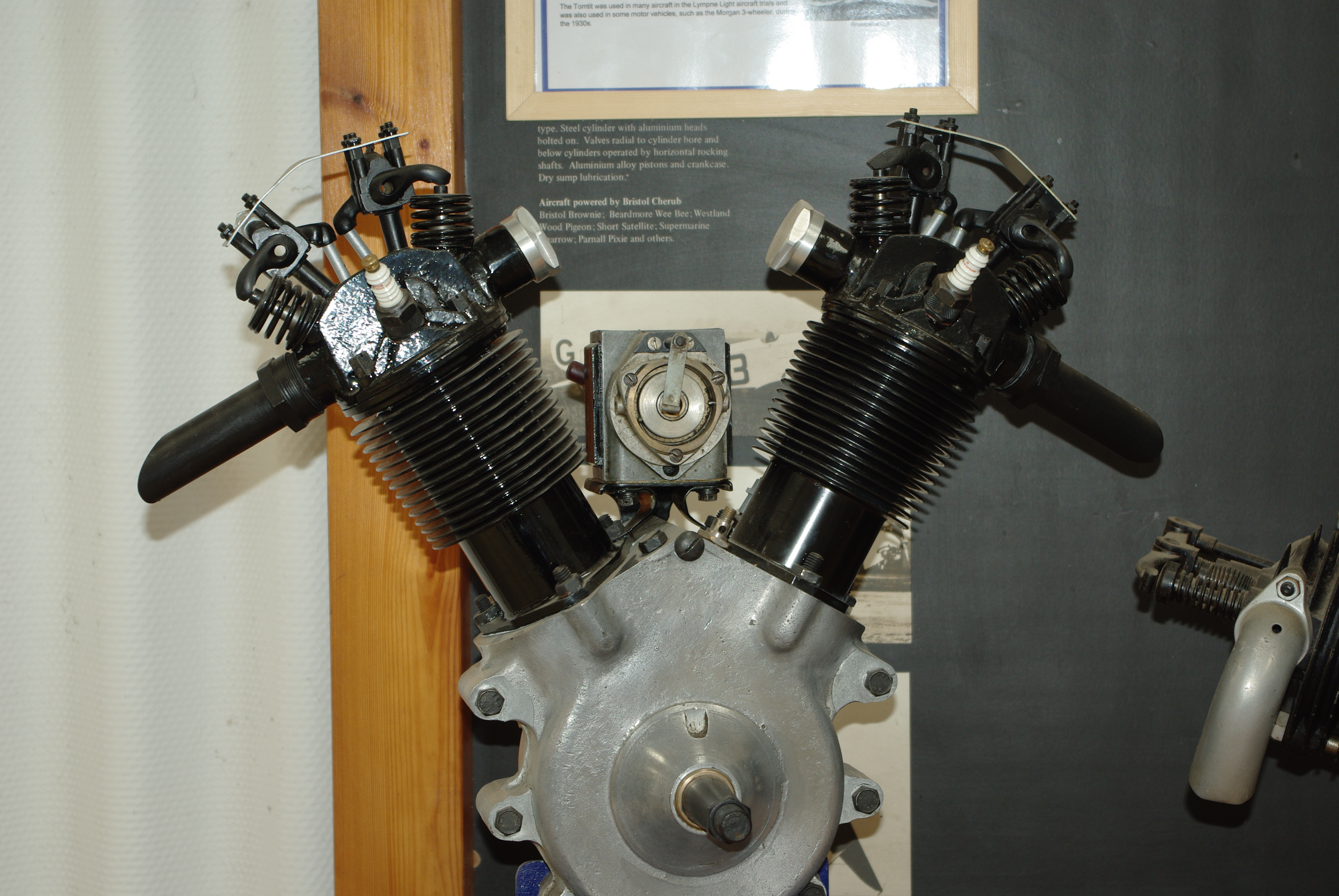
- The Shuttleworth Collection's Tomtit seen from the output (propeller) side. Valve pushrods can be glimpsed behind cylinder heads.
- Type: Air-cooled V-twin
- National origin: United Kingdom
- Manufacturer: Burney and Blackburne, Ltd., Bookham, Surrey
- First run: c. 1922

The Blackburne Tomtit was a 670 cc V-twin aero engine for light aircraft that was designed and produced by Burney and Blackburne Limited. Burney and Blackburne was based at Bookham, Surrey, England and was a former motorcycle manufacturer.

== Design and development ==
The Blackburne Tomtit engine was developed from Blackburne's motorcycle engines. The first one adapted to aircraft use was the best performing engine at the Lympne light aircraft trials of 1923, despite its lack of refinement. The Tomtit was a modified version of the Lympne 696 cc V-twin, marketed specifically for flight.

The Tomtit could run upright or inverted and was the first British engine to fly inverted, in the ANEC I. The inverted configuration was more common, but the Avro 558 used it in the upright arrangement, and the Avro 560 flew with both upright and inverted Tomtits.

== Applications (including early Lympne 1923 version) ==
ANEC I
Avro 558
Avro 560
BICh-3 (the world's first flying wing)
Dabrowski D.1 Cykacz
Darmstadt D-11 Mohamed
de Havilland Humming Bird
Gloster Gannet
Gnosspelius Gull
Gribovsky G-5
Handley Page H.P.23
Heath Parasol
Parnall Pixie II
Reid biplane
Short Cockle
Wheeler Slymph

== Specifications ==
Data from Flight

=== General characteristics ===
- Type: V-twin four-stroke piston engine
- Bore: 71 mm (2.80 in)
- Stroke: 88 mm (3.46 in)
- Displacement: 696 cc (42.5 cu in)
- Dry weight: 34 kg (75 lb)

=== Performance ===
- Power output: 16 hp (12 kW) at 2,400 rpm
- Specific fuel consumption: 0.58 pint (0.33 litre) per hp per hour
- Oil consumption: 0.035 pint (0.02 litre) per hp per hour

== See also ==
- Blackburne Thrush

Related lists

- List of aircraft engines
