= Vickers Vagabond =

Vagabond
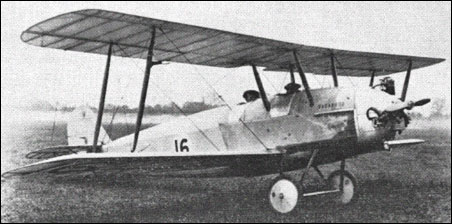

General information
- Type: Two-seat light aircraft
- National origin: United Kingdom
- Manufacturer: Vickers
- Designer: R.K. Pierson
- Number built: 1

History
- First flight: 1924

The Vickers Vagabond was Vickers' entrant for the second Lympne light aircraft competition, held in 1924. It was a conventional small biplane, with a very unusual method of trimming. It was eliminated from the trials at an early stage and only one was built.

== Development ==
Following the first Lympne trials held in 1923 for single-seat motor-gliders, the Air Ministry organised a similar event in 1924, this time for low-powered two-seat aircraft. The engine capacity limit was set at 1,100 cc. and, as before, the wings had to fold for easy transport and storage. The trials took place between 29 September and 4 October. Several companies built aircraft for them, including the Blackburn Bluebird, Hawker Cygnet, Supermarine Sparrow and two from Westland, the Woodpigeon and Widgeon.

The Type 98 Vagabond was Vickers' entry. It was a single-bay, wire-braced biplane with wings of constant chord except towards the rounded trailing tips. The wings had equal span and carried marked stagger. There were ailerons on both upper and lower wings, with flaps inboard on the lower wings which could be folded to assist wing-folding. The pilot and passenger sat in open cockpits, the latter under the upper wing. The pilot's upward view was enhanced by a small cutout in the trailing edge of the top wing. The fuselage had a more rounded cross-section than that of the earlier Viget, Vickers' single-seat entry to the 1923 competition, extending a little below the lower wing. The 32 hp (24 kW) Bristol Cherub III flat twin engine was mounted in a smooth nose with the finned cylinders exposed for air cooling. The horizontal tail was similar to that of the Viget, but the fin and rudder were much more rounded. Because of the stagger, the mainwheels were in front of the lower wing, braced to the lower fuselage logeron aft to the front wing spar and forward to a point roughly below the upper wing leading edge.

A most unusual feature of the Vagabond was the method of longitudinal trimming. Rather than changing the angle of the tailplane with respect to the fuselage, the whole rear part of the fuselage was hinged just ahead of the lower wing's trailing edge. This was controlled via a handwheel between the two cockpits; the rear fuselage was raised at the start of a landing descent to increase drag and slow the aircraft.

Early flight trials, with H.J.Pain as pilot revealed a need to stiffen the engine mountings. When this was done, the Vagabond, now fitted with a three-cylinder 1,095 cc Blackburne Thrush radial engine flew well enough at Lympne, but was eliminated in the preliminary rounds. Only one Vagabond, registered as G-EBJF on 1 July 1924 was built. It was deregistered on 24 January 1928.

== Specifications ==
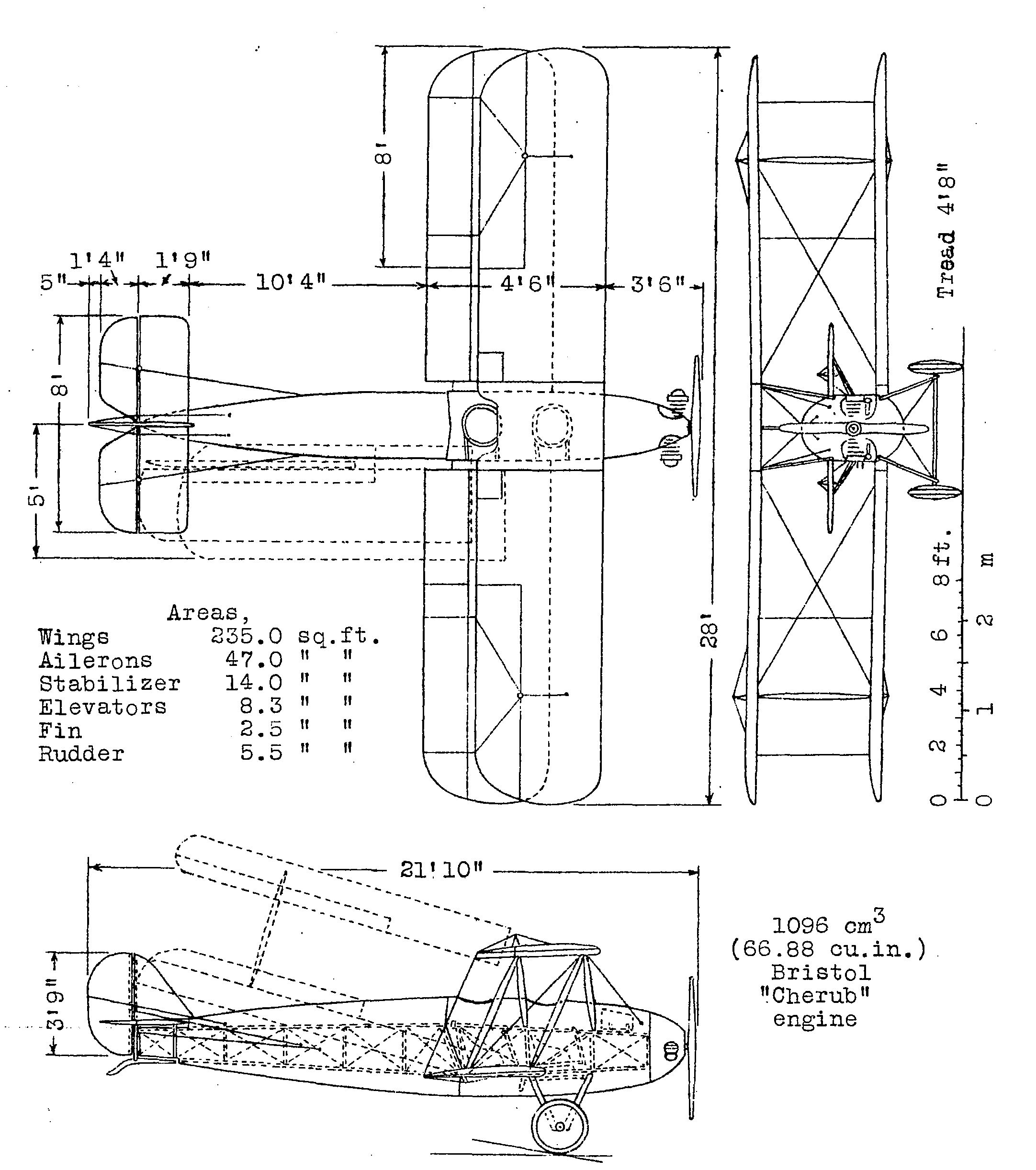
Vickers Vagabond 3-view drawing from NACA-TM-289

Data from

General characteristics

- Crew: 1
- Capacity: 1 passenger
- Length: 21 ft 10 in (6.65 m)
- Wingspan: 28 ft 0 in (8.53 m)
- Width: 10 ft 0 in (3.05 m) (width wings folded)
- Wing area: 235 sq ft (21.8 m^{2})
- Empty weight: 527 lb (239 kg)
- Gross weight: 887 lb (402 kg)
- Powerplant: 1 × Bristol Cherub III flat twin, 32 hp (24 kW)

Performance

- Maximum speed: 77 mph (124 km/h, 67 kn)
