= Supermarine Sparrow =

1920s British light aircraft

Sparrow
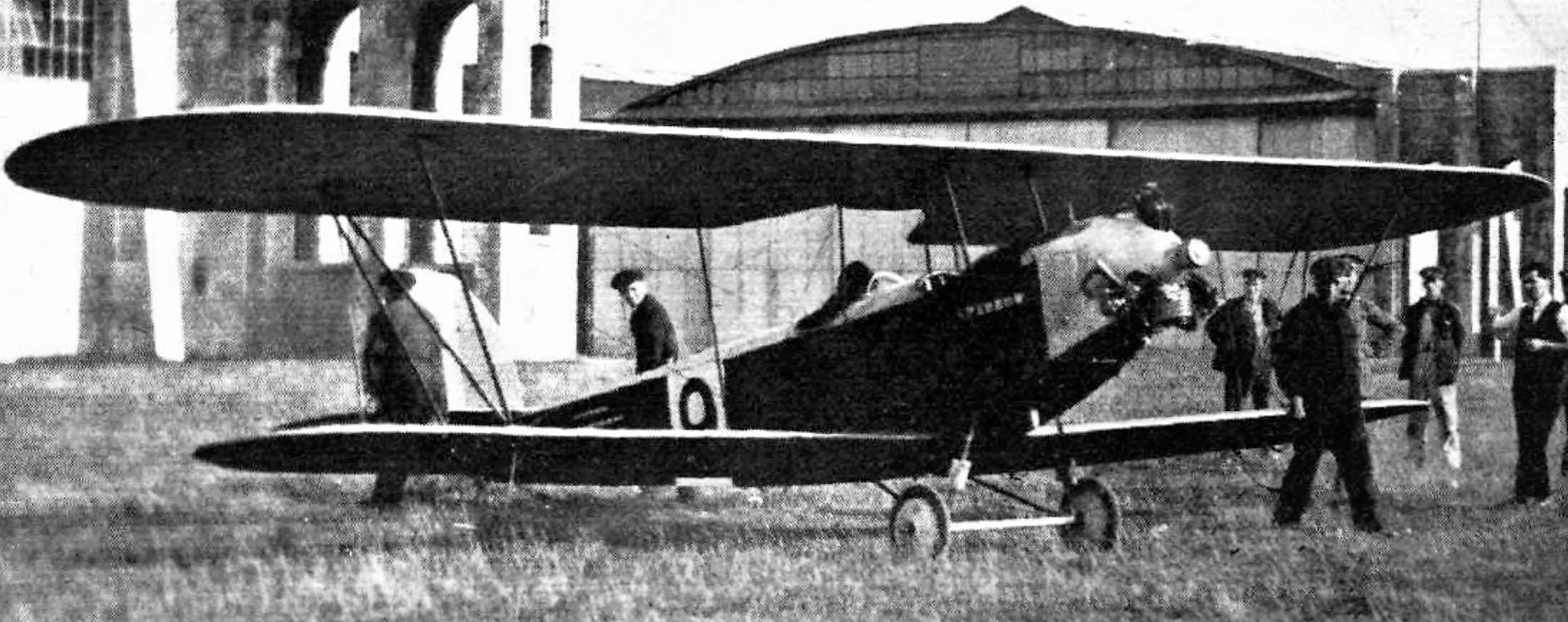
- Sparrow I at the 1924 Two-Seater Light Aeroplane Competition at Lympne

General information
- Type: Two-seat light sports aircraft
- National origin: United Kingdom
- Manufacturer: Supermarine Aviation Works
- Designer: R.J. Mitchell
- Number built: 1

History
- First flight: 11 September 1924
- Retired: 1930

The Supermarine Sparrow (later called the Sparrow I) was a British two-seat light biplane designed by R.J. Mitchell and built at Supermarine's works at Woolston, Southampton. It first flew on 11 September 1924. After being rebuilt in 1926 as a parasol monoplane, it was re-designated Sparrow II.

The Sparrow was Supermarine's earliest landplane. It was a wooden two-seat sesquiplane powered by a 35-horsepower (26 kW) Blackburne Thrush. It had foldable wings with different cross sections; to allow the aircraft to take-off and land over short distances, Mitchell gave the wings a high angle of attack. The Sparrow behaved erratically during tests. It was entered for the 1924 Two-Seater Light Aeroplane Competition but suffered engine failure during the competition. A substitute engine failed during the race, forcing the pilot to land at short notice, and the plane was eliminated.

Sparrow II was heavier and slower than its predecessor. It was entered for the 1926 competition at Lympne but, having made a forced landing near Beachy Head, was eliminated. Mitchell went on to use Sparrow II to test new aerofoil designs for the Air Ministry. It was subsequently sold to a flying club and was scrapped in 1933.

== Background ==
Following the end of World War I, private flying in the UK was progressed slowly. Ex-military aircraft were generally unsuitable, having been designed during the war to suit specific purposes, and aircraft companies considered that little profit could be obtained from aircraft made for private use.

In 1923, the Royal Aero Club organised the first of a series of annual flying competitions at Lympne, Kent, for single-seat aircraft. The following year, Supermarine entered the Sparrow for the Two-Seater Light Aeroplane Competition, which was held in late September and early October 1924. The winner's prize was £2,000 (equivalent to £135,108.57 in 2023) for "the best light plane designed and built in Great Britain, suitable for flying clubs and the private owner".

== Design ==
The Sparrow was Supermarine's earliest design for a landplane, following the company's change of identity from Pemberton-Billing Ltd in 1916.

Designed by R.J. Mitchell, Supermarine's young chief designer, the Sparrow was a wooden two-seat sesquiplane, with wings that were designed to fold. The two wings had different cross sections. The aircraft was powered by a 35-horsepower (26 kW) Blackburne Thrush piston engine, with dual controls. The engine was, however, untried.

The fuselage was built of fabric-covered plywood. The propellers were made to match the rotation speed of the engine, which, at 3500 rpm, was unusually high. The aircraft's hull and struts were painted dark blue. Mitchell took the need for the aircraft to handle short take-off and landing runs into his design. He ensured that the wings were given a high angle of attack, providing the fuselage with an upward kink. Both wings were fitted with aerofoils.

== Performance ==
=== Sparrow I ===
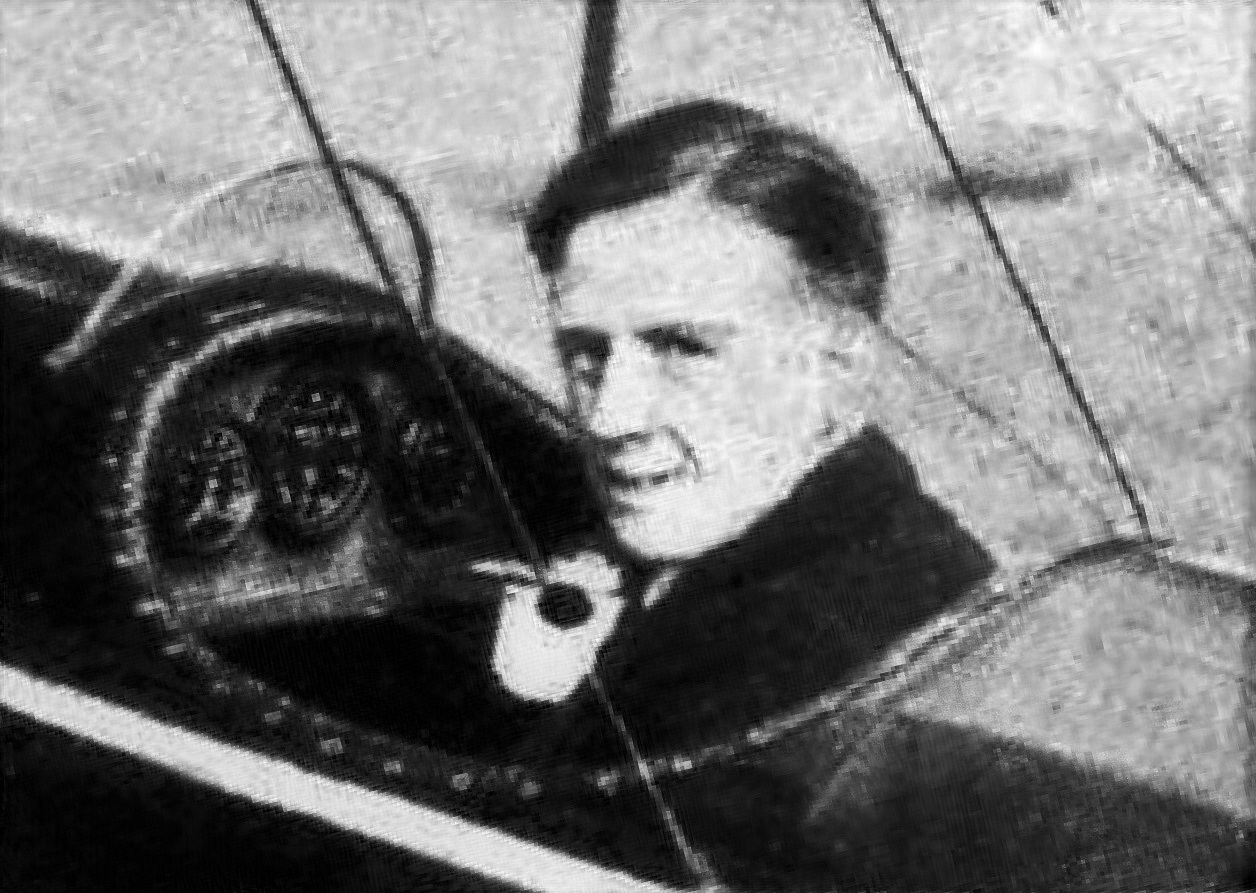
Henri Biard, the pilot of the Supermarine Sparrow (Flight, October 1924)

Sparrow I first flew on 11 September 1924, piloted by Henri Biard. It was refitted with a modified propeller on 27 September. Its behaviour when being tested was erratic. According to Biard, "it was as impudent as its name implied". The Sparrow was demonstrated before its designer, R.J. Mitchell, and other Supermarine directors. The engine failed when the plane was airborne, and the directors raced towards a hole in a hedge that it had crashed through. Biard was found, unscathed. Attempts to restart the engine failed, and the demonstration was called off. The Sparrow then flew back without further trouble.

The Air Ministry assessment described the Sparrow as lacking attention to detail — specifically referring to the inadequate design of the landing gear and the excessive number of external controls. The pilot's view from the cockpit was limited by the position of the upper wing.

The three-cylinder radial engine proved to be extremely unreliable, and the Sparrow was eliminated from the light aircraft trial due to engine failure, when a connecting rod failed. An engine substituted to replace the original machine initially refused to start and then seized, forcing Biard to make an emergency landing.

In the Grosvenor Trophy Race at Lympne on 14 October 1924, it came fourth with a speed of 62.08 mph (99.91 km/h). During the first lap of the race, the Sparrow overtook a Westland biplane and maintained this position until the sixth lap, when it was in turn overtaken by the Bristol Brownie.

The Sparrow was registered as G-EBJP, but it never apparently carried the marking. Photographs of the aeroplane show that it was marked with numbers during the competitions it was entered for.

=== Sparrow II ===
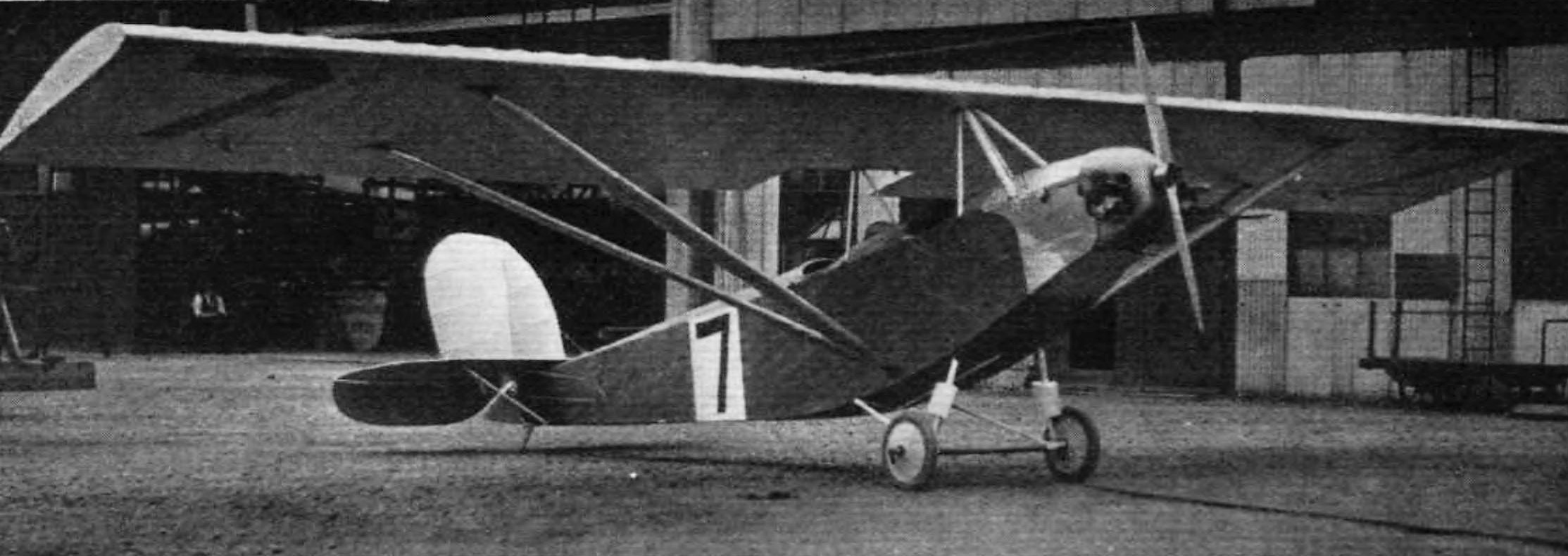
Sparrow II at the 1926 Two-Seater Light Aeroplane Competition at Lympne

Re-designated the Sparrow II, the aircraft was rebuilt and re-engined with a 32-horsepower (24 kW) Bristol Cherub III engine. It entered the 1926 competition (Note: The 1926 competition was for aircraft under 176 pounds (80 kg) that could fly with the greatest load-to-fuel ratio carried over courses that totalled 2,000 miles (3,200 km).) at Lympne as a parasol monoplane. Sparrow II was 130 pounds (59 kg) heavier and 7 miles per hour (11 km/h) slower than its predecessor.

Sparrow II was outclassed but successfully passed the elimination trials. It failed to pass the racing starting line; due to poor weather conditions, it made a forced landing near Beachy Head on 12 September 1926, with Biard noticing that loose rivets were likely to cause the wings to fall off. Sparrow II was thus eliminated from the competition, which was won by the Hawker Cygnet. Sparrow II competed for two other races the following week, but was unplaced in both. The Sparrow's participation in the 1926 trials delayed work being done at the time on the Supermarine Seamew.

Mitchell used Sparrow II to work with the Air Ministry at RAF Worthy Down, fitting the aircraft with his aerofoil designs for other aircraft, and compared the results obtained with those produced using wind tunnel tests. (Note: The aerofoils tested by Mitchell were Clark Y, RAF 30, T64, and SA 12.) The aircraft was then sold to the Halton Aero Club. It survived until 1933, when it was scrapped.

== Variants ==
Sparrow I
Blackburne Thrush-powered biplane.
Sparrow II
Sparrow I modified into a monoplane powered by a Bristol Cherub III piston engine.

== Specifications (Sparrow I) ==
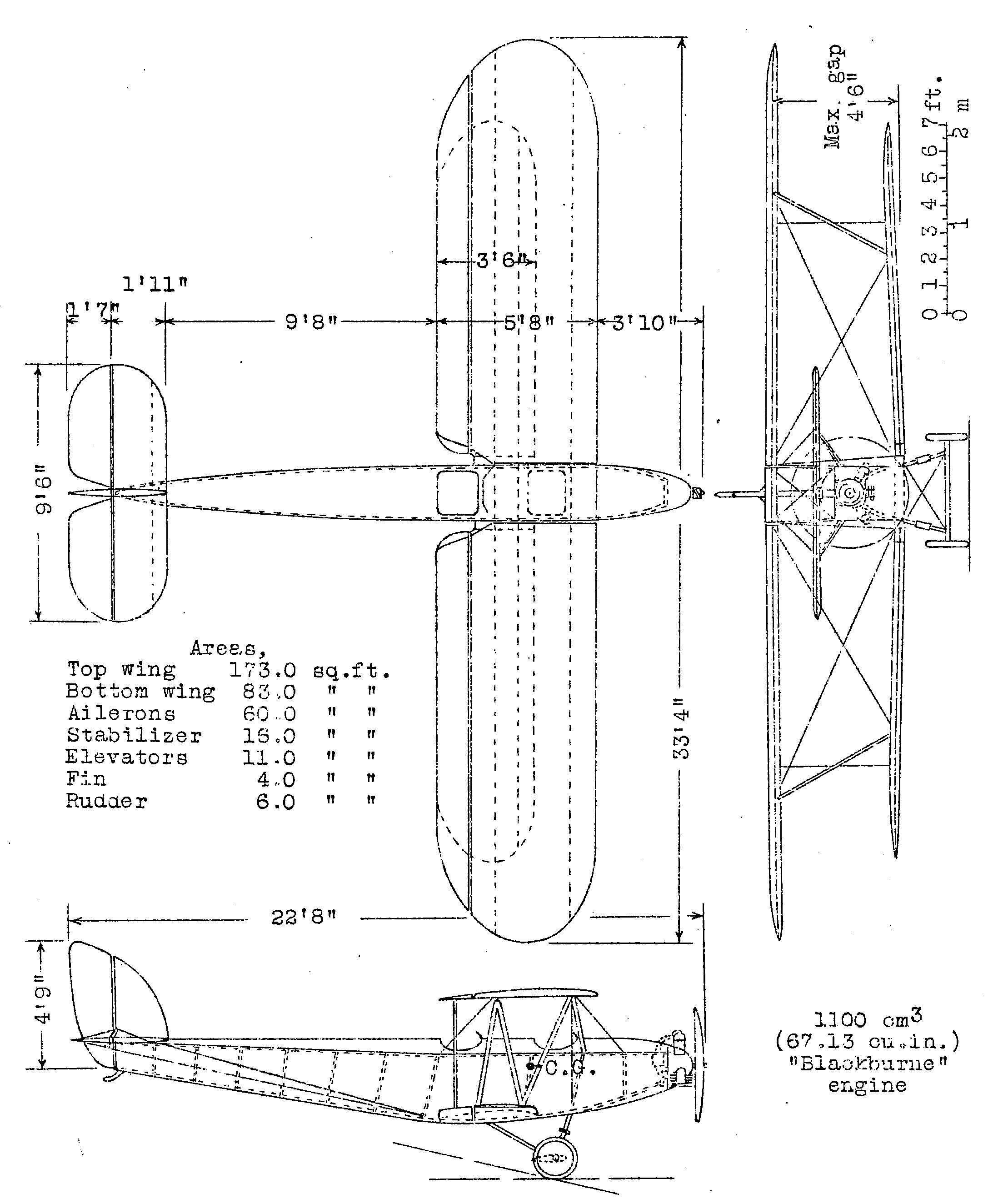
Supermarine Sparrow I 3-view drawing from NACA-TM-289

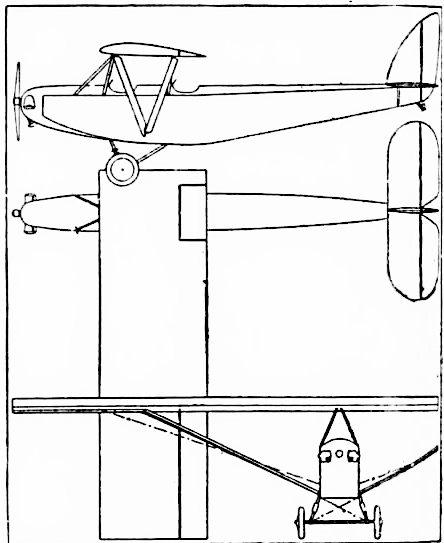
Supermarine Sparrow II, as illustrated in Aviation magazine (1 November 1926)

Data from British Civil Aircraft 1919–1972.

General characteristics

- Crew: 1
- Length: 22 ft 8 in (6.91 m)
- Wingspan: 33 ft 4 in (10.16 m)
- Height: 7 ft 5 in (2.26 m)
- Wing area: 256 sq ft (23.8 m^{2})
- Airfoil: root: NACA; tip: NACA
- Empty weight: 215 lb (98 kg)
- Gross weight: 390 lb (177 kg)
- Powerplant: 1 × Blackburne Thrush 3-cylinder air-cooled radial piston engine, 35 hp (26 kW)
- Propellers: 2-bladed fixed-pitch propeller

Performance

- Maximum speed: 116 mph (187 km/h, 101 kn)
- Service ceiling: 3,350 ft (1,020 m)

== See also ==
Aircraft of comparable role, configuration, and era

- de Havilland Humming Bird
- Hawker Cygnet

== Sources ==
- Andrews, C. F.; Morgan, Eric B. (1981). Supermarine Aircraft since 1914. London: Putnam. ISBN 978-0-370-10018-0.
- Jackson, A.J. (1988). British Civil Aircraft 1919–1972. Vol. 3. London: Putnam. ISBN 978-0-85177-818-1.
- Pegram, Ralph (2016). Beyond the Spitfire: The Unseen Designs of R.J. Mitchell. Brimscombe: The History Press. ISBN 978-0-7509-6515-6.
