= Salmon Tandem Monoplane =

Tandem Monoplane

General information
- Type: Light single-seat sport
- National origin: United Kingdom
- Manufacturer: Percy Salmon
- Designer: Percy Salmon
- Number built: 1

History
- Introduction date: 1923
- Retired: 1923
- Fate: burnt, 1935

The Salmon Tandem Monoplane was a single-seat sport aeroplane produced for the 1923 Lympne light aircraft trials. The aeroplane failed to fly.

== Development ==
With prizes worth a total of £2,150, the Lympne light aircraft competition of October 1923 attracted 28 entries including the Tandem Monoplane which was given competition number 27.

Designed by Percy Salmon, a draughtsman for the RAE, it was a single-seat tandem-wing aircraft. It was powered by a 3.5 hp (2.6 kW) Bradshaw motorcycle engine driving a tractor propeller mounted at the end of a strut-braced driveshaft. It was registered as G-EBHQ on 23 March 1923 and was ready to fly several months later.

== Operational history ==
In September 1923, at Farnborough, several take-off attempts were made by Flying Officer Cecil Bouchier, but they were all unsuccessful. The aircraft did not attend the Lympne light aircraft trials, and was stored at Farnborough until 1935 when it was burned.

== Specifications ==
Data from British Light Aeroplanes

General characteristics

- Crew: 1
- Length: 24 ft (7.3 m)
- Wingspan: 30 ft (9.1 m)
- Height: 6 ft (1.8 m)
- Wing area: 160 sq ft (15 m^{2})
- Empty weight: 275 lb (125 kg)
- Gross weight: 445 lb (202 kg)
- Powerplant: 1 × Bradshaw flat twin 2 cylinder, 3.5 hp (2.6 kW)
- Propellers: 2-bladed

Performance
