= Avro 558 =

General information
- Type: Ultralight Biplane
- Manufacturer: A.V.Roe and Company Limited
- Number built: 2

History
- Introduction date: 1923
- First flight: 1923

The Avro 558 was a British single-engined ultralight biplane built by Avro at Hamble Aerodrome.

== Design and development ==
The Avro 558 was designed for the 1923 light aircraft trials for single-seaters at Lympne Aerodrome. Two Avro 558 biplanes were built, they were biplanes powered by motorcycle engines (one with a B&H twin-cylinder air-cooled engine, the second with a 500 cc Douglas engine). The first aircraft was modified with a 698 cc (42.6 in^{3}) Blackburne Tomtit and both had modifications to the landing gear.

== Operational history ==
The aircraft did not win the competition, but the second aircraft went on to establish a world record for its class of aircraft of 13,850 ft (4,222 m) over Lympne on 13 October 1923. It is not known what happened to the two aircraft, not having been reported since 1923.

== Operators ==
United Kingdom

== Specifications ==
Data from Avro Aircraft since 1908

General characteristics

- Crew: 1
- Length: 19 ft 6 in (5.94 m)
- Wingspan: 30 ft 0 in (9.14 m)
- Wing area: 166 sq ft (15.4 m^{2})
- Empty weight: 294 lb (133 kg)
- Gross weight: 480 lb (218 kg)
- Powerplant: 1 × Douglas 500cc air-cooled motorcycle engine, 18 hp (13 kW)
- Propellers: 2-bladed fixed-pitch propeller

Performance

- Service ceiling: 13,850 ft (4,220 m)

== See also ==
Aircraft of comparable role, configuration, and era

- Avro 560
- Hawker Cygnet
