= Vickers Viget =

Viget
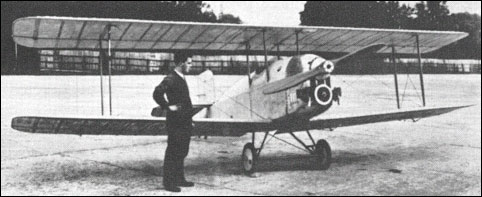

General information
- Type: light aircraft
- National origin: United Kingdom
- Manufacturer: Vickers
- Designer: R.K. Pierson
- Number built: 1

History
- First flight: 1923

The Vickers Viget was Vickers' entrant for the first Lympne light aircraft competition, held in 1923. It was a single-seat, single-engined biplane with folding wings.

== Development ==
In 1923 the Royal Aero Club (RAeC) organised what became known as the Lympne Light Aeroplane Trials, although the RAeC referred to the competing aircraft as motor-gliders. They were required to be single-seaters. The intention was to encourage the development economical private aviation, so the engine size was limited to 750 cc. Various sponsors provided the prizes, particularly the total of £1500 jointly from the Duke of Sutherland and the Daily Mail. The event took place from 8–13 October 1923. There were many entrants from the British aviation industry, including the de Havilland Humming Bird and the Gloster Gannet. The Type 89 Viget was Vickers' entry.

It was a small single-bay biplane with constant chord wings of no stagger. There was dihedral on the lower plane only. Full span ailerons were fitted on both upper and lower wings. The lower wing was mounted on the bottom of the fuselage and the upper one well clear of the head of the pilot, who sat under it in an open cockpit. The wings folded, as the competition rules required this for ease of storage. The fuselage was deep for its width and carried a conventional, rather square cut empennage with unbalanced control surfaces. The single-axle undercarriage was braced to the front and rear wing spars at the roots, the legs splayed out to broaden the track. A 750 cc Douglas motorcycle engine was mounted horizontally, with the cylinder heads protruding either side below the propeller boss.

The Viget flew well enough at Lympne in the hands of Stan Cockerell, but failed to win prizes. It did win some publicity after a rocker arm failure led to a forced landing about six miles from Lympne. Cockerell folded the wings and pushed the aircraft home, stopping at a pub. When he returned to the aircraft for the final leg, he found an expectant crowd who had mistaken it for a Punch and Judy booth.

Vickers attempted to sell the Viget, advertising it in 1924 as suitable for "Sports, commercial and training purposes". Despite the suggestion in the advertisement that it could be fitted with a Bristol Cherub or an unspecified Blackburne engine, there is no evidence that either of these was installed. Only one Viget, registered G-EBHN, was built. It was registered on 3 August 1923 and deregistered on 21 January 1929.

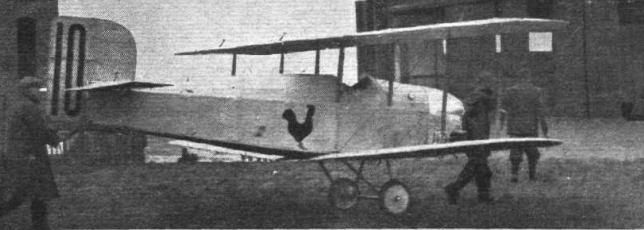
Ground handling

== Specifications ==
Data from

General characteristics

- Crew: 1
- Length: 17 ft 4 in (5.28 m)
- Wingspan: 25 ft 0 in (7.62 m)
- Height: 7 ft 3 in (2.21 m)
- Wing area: 200 sq ft (19 m^{2})
- Airfoil: RAF 15
- Empty weight: 390 lb (177 kg)
- Gross weight: 570 lb (259 kg)
- Powerplant: 1 × Douglas 68cc 2 cylinder horizontally opposed (power unknown)

Performance

- Maximum speed: 58 mph (93 km/h, 50 kn)
