= Avro Avis =

Avro 562 Avis
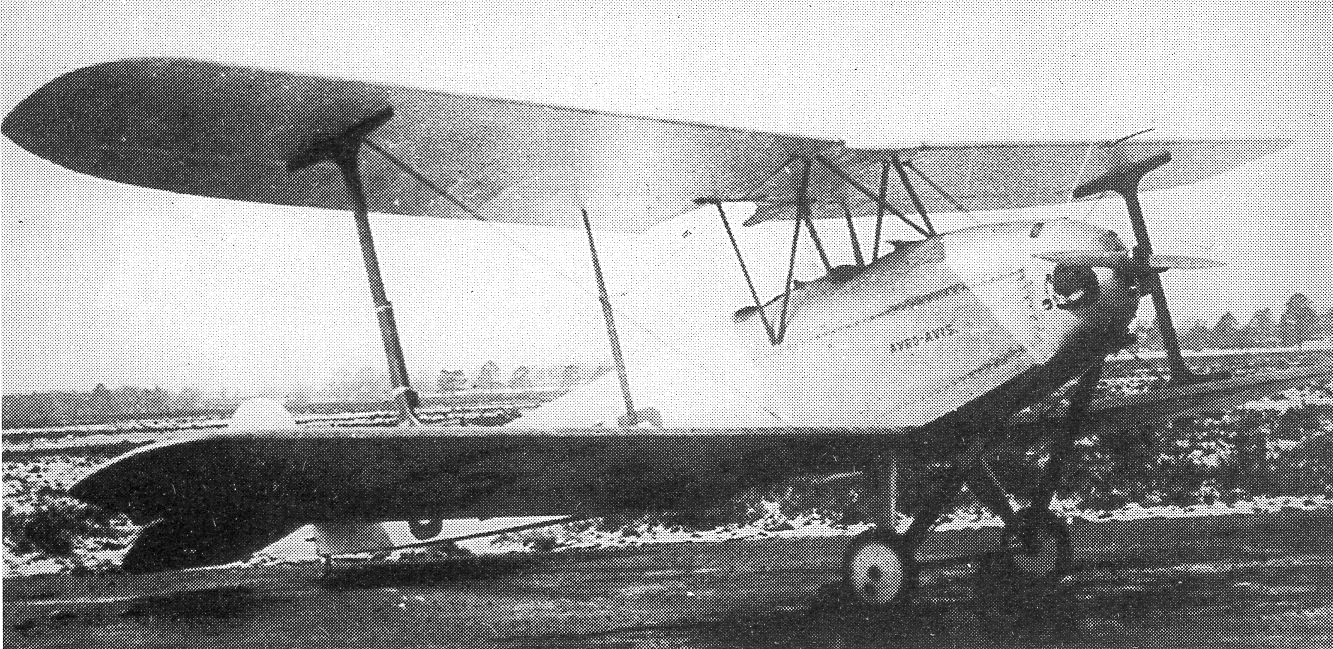

General information
- Type: Light biplane
- National origin: United Kingdom
- Manufacturer: Avro
- Number built: 1

History
- First flight: 1924
- Retired: 1931

The Avro 562 Avis was a two-seat light biplane designed and built by A.V.Roe and Company Limited at Hamble for the 1924 Lympne Light Aeroplane Trials.

== Design and development ==
The Avis was a single-bay unstaggered biplane with full-span ailerons on both upper and lower wings. It had a fixed landing gear with a tailskid and could be powered by a nose-mounted 32 hp Bristol Cherub II engine or a 35 hp Blackburne Thrush radial piston engine. It had tandem open cockpits. First flown with the Thrush engine prior to the trials, it was refitted with the Cherub and first flown with this engine by Bert Hinkler at Lympne on 30 September 1924. On the next day, it won the Grosvenor Cup at a speed of 65.87 mph.

For the 1926 trials, it was re-engined with a 38 hp Blackburne Thrush, being eliminated after a forced landing. In 1927, it was re-engined again with a Bristol Cherub I and passed into private ownership until it was scrapped in 1931.

== Specifications ==
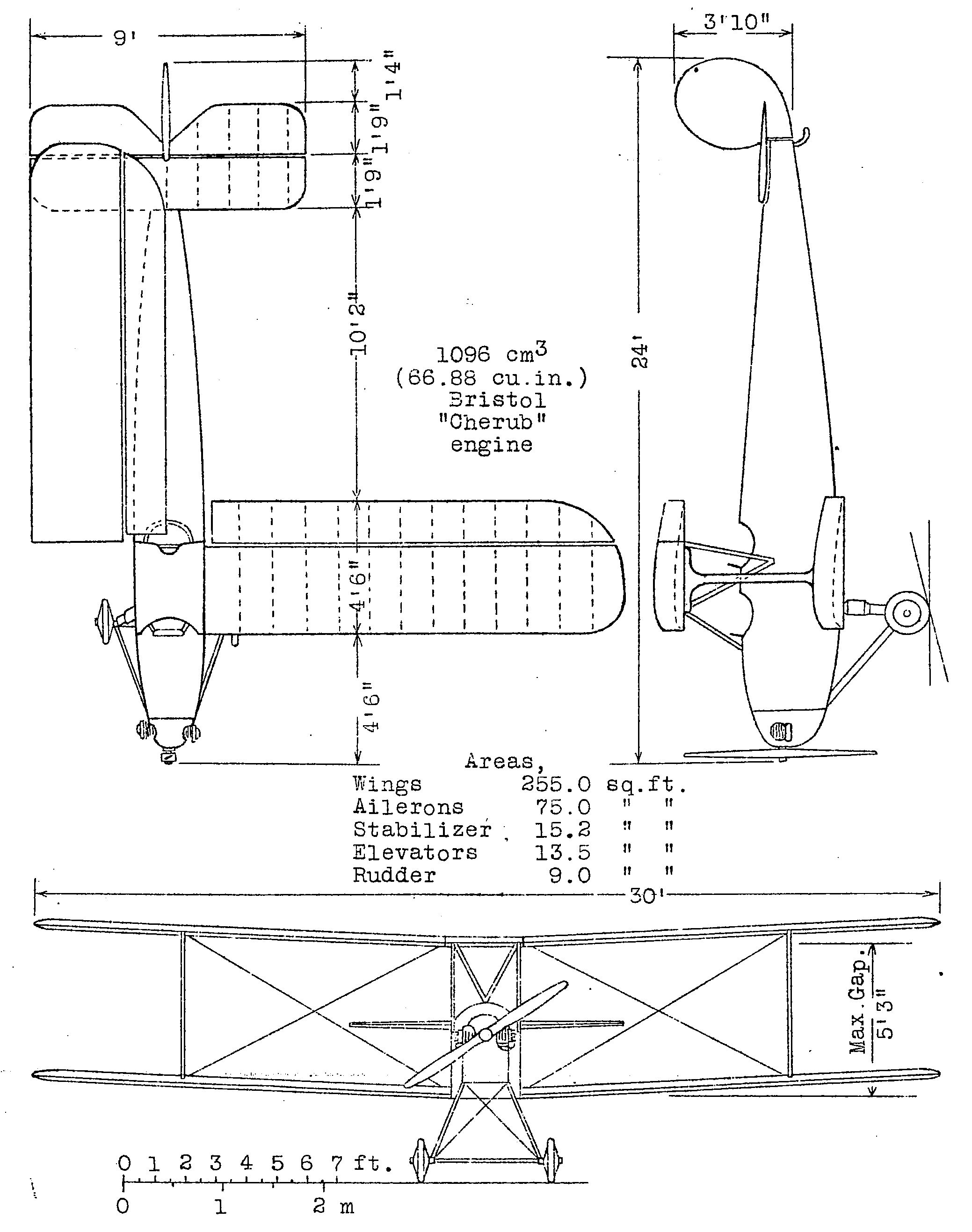
Avro Avis 3-view drawing from NACA-TM-289

Data from Avro Aircraft since 1908.

General characteristics

- Crew: one (pilot)
- Capacity: one (passenger)
- Length: 24 ft 0 in (7.32 m)
- Wingspan: 30 ft 1 in (9.17 m)
- Height: 9 ft 0 in (2.74 m)
- Wing area: 246 sq ft (22.9 m^{2})
- Empty weight: 590 lb (268 kg)
- Gross weight: 995 lb (451 kg)
- Powerplant: 1 × Blackburne Thrush three-cylinder air-cooled radial engine , 35 hp (26 kW)

Performance

- Maximum speed: 75 mph (120 km/h, 65 kn)

== See also ==
Aircraft of comparable role, configuration, and era

- Hawker Cygnet
- Westland Widgeon
