= Avro 560 =

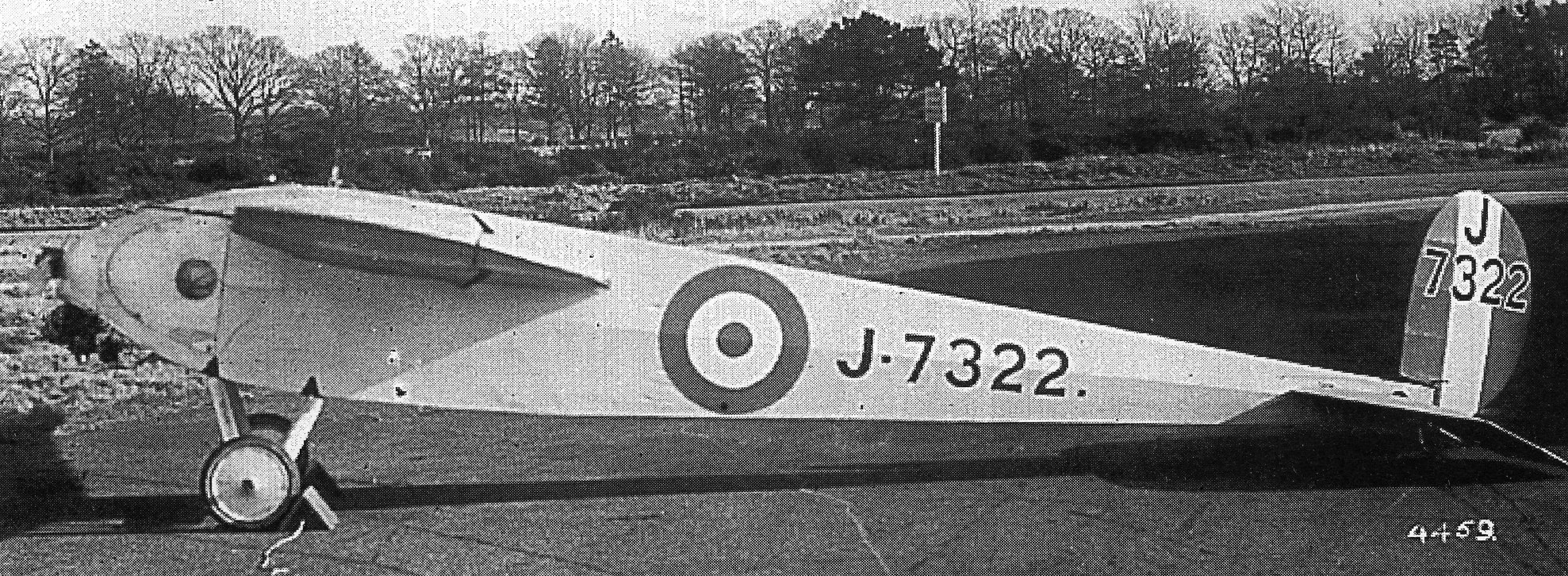

General information
- Type: Ultralight sportsplane
- Manufacturer: A.V.Roe and Company Limited
- Number built: 1

History
- Introduction date: 1923
- First flight: 1923

The Avro 560 was a British single-engined ultralight monoplane built by Avro at Hamble Aerodrome.

== Design and development ==
The Avro 560 was designed for the 1923 light aircraft trials for single-seaters at Lympne Aerodrome. The Avro 560 was an ultralight built of wood-and-fabric construction, a cantilever high-wing monoplane. It was powered by a 698 cc (42.6 cu in) Blackburne Tomtit engine. The aircraft was flown by Bert Hinkler during the trials held in October 1923; the 560 did well and recorded an average of 63.3 mi (101.9 km) per Imp gal (4.5 L). The aircraft was evaluated by the Air Ministry after the trials but was not chosen for further production and only one 560 was built.

== Operators ==
United Kingdom

- Air Ministry

== Specifications ==
Data from Avro Aircraft since 1908

General characteristics

- Crew: 1
- Length: 21 ft 0 in (6.40 m)
- Wingspan: 36 ft 0 in (10.97 m)
- Wing area: 138 sq ft (12.8 m^{2})
- Empty weight: 285 lb (129 kg)
- Gross weight: 471 lb (214 kg)
- Powerplant: 1 × Blackburne Tomtit V-2 air-cooled motorcycle engine, 20 hp (15 kW)
- Propellers: 2-bladed fixed-pitch propeller

== See also ==
Aircraft of comparable role, configuration, and era

- Hawker Cygnet
