= Blackburne Thrush =

1920s British aircraft piston engine

Thrush
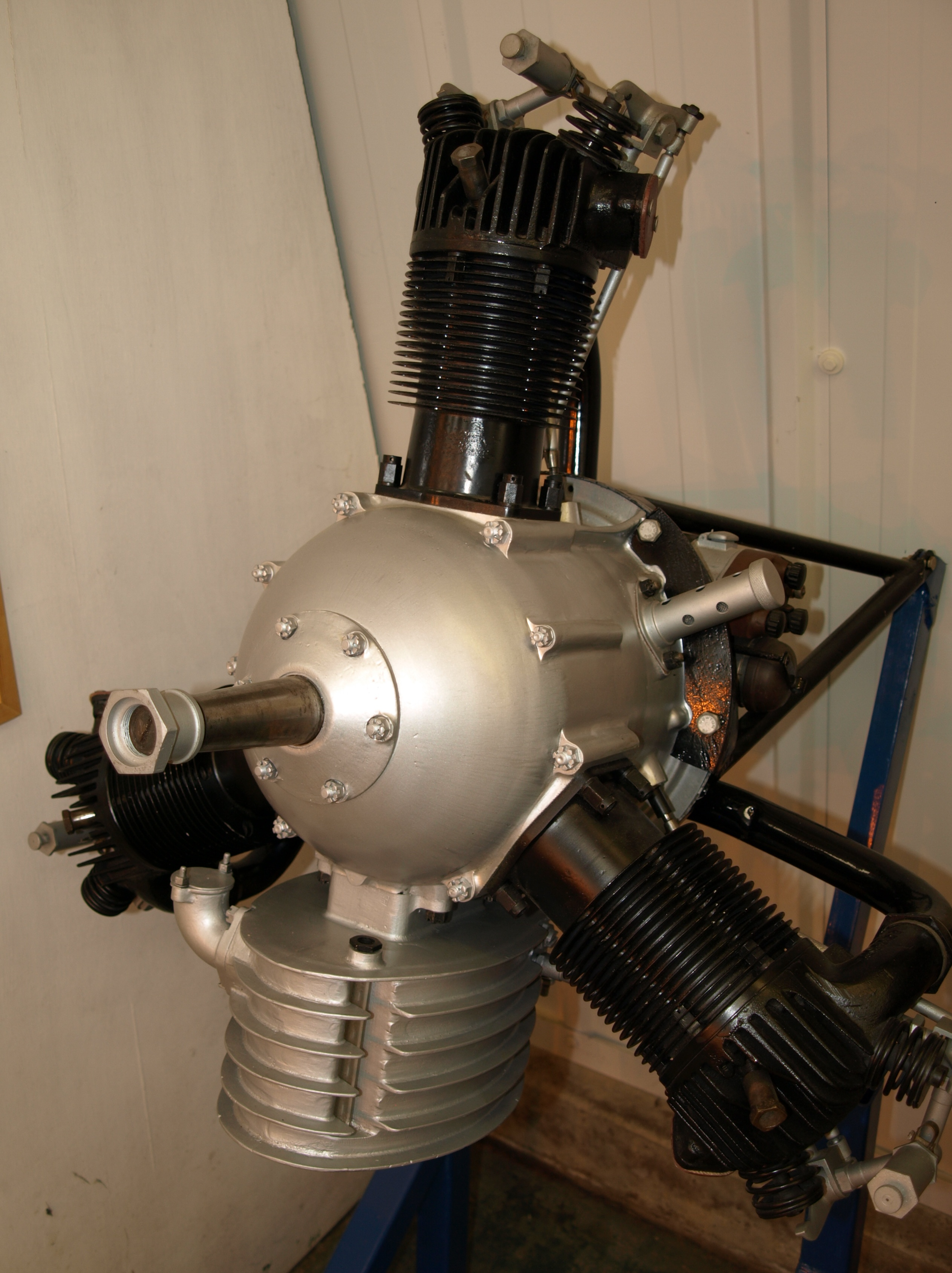
- Blackburne Thrush engine preserved at the Shuttleworth Collection
- Type: Air-cooled radial
- National origin: United Kingdom
- Manufacturer: Burney and Blackburne Limited
- First run: 1924

The Blackburne Thrush was a 1,500 cc three-cylinder radial aero-engine for light aircraft produced by Burney and Blackburne Limited. Burney and Blackburne were based at Bookham, Surrey, England and was a former motorcycle manufacturer.

First produced in 1926 the engine was based on an earlier 1924 design with improvements to allow use on light aircraft.

== Applications ==
- ANEC IV
- Blackburn Bluebird
- Clarke Cheetah
- Cranwell CLA.4
- Parnall Pixie
- Supermarine Sparrow
- Vickers Vagabond
- Westland Widgeon

== Specifications (Thrush) ==
Data from Lumsden

=== General characteristics ===
- Type: 3-cylinder air-cooled radial
- Bore: 3.16 in (81 mm)
- Stroke: 3.78 in (96.8 mm)
- Displacement: 88.97 cu in (1.5 L)
- Dry weight: 132 lb (60 kg)

=== Components ===
- Valvetrain: Overhead poppet valve
- Cooling system: Air-cooled

=== Performance ===
- Power output: 35 hp (26 kW)
- Power-to-weight ratio: 0.26 hp/lb

== See also ==
Related development

- Blackburne Tomtit

Comparable engines

- Bristol Lucifer
- Salmson AD.3

Related lists

- List of aircraft engines
