= Westland Woodpigeon =

Type of aircraft

Woodpigeon

General information
- Type: Two-seat biplane
- National origin: United Kingdom
- Manufacturer: Westland Aircraft
- Number built: 2

History
- First flight: 14 September 1924

The Westland Woodpigeon was a British two-seat light biplane designed to compete in the 1924 Lympne light aircraft trials.

== Design and development ==
The Woodpigeon was a conventional wooden biplane powered by a 32 hp (24 kW) Bristol Cherub III engine. Two aircraft were built. The first made its first flight on 14 September 1924; the second aircraft, registered G-EBJV, flew in trials but was not successful. The second aircraft was re-engined with a 30 hp (22 kW) ABC Scorpion and increased wingspan in 1926 for the 1926 Lympne trials but again was not successful. In 1927 the two aircraft were re-engined with 60 hp (45 kW) Anzani 6 radials and redesignated Woodpigeon II.

== Variants ==
Woodpigeon I
Bristol Cherub III-powered variant, two built.
Woodpigeon II
Two Woodpigeon Is re-engined with Anzani engines.

== Specifications (Woodpigeon I) ==
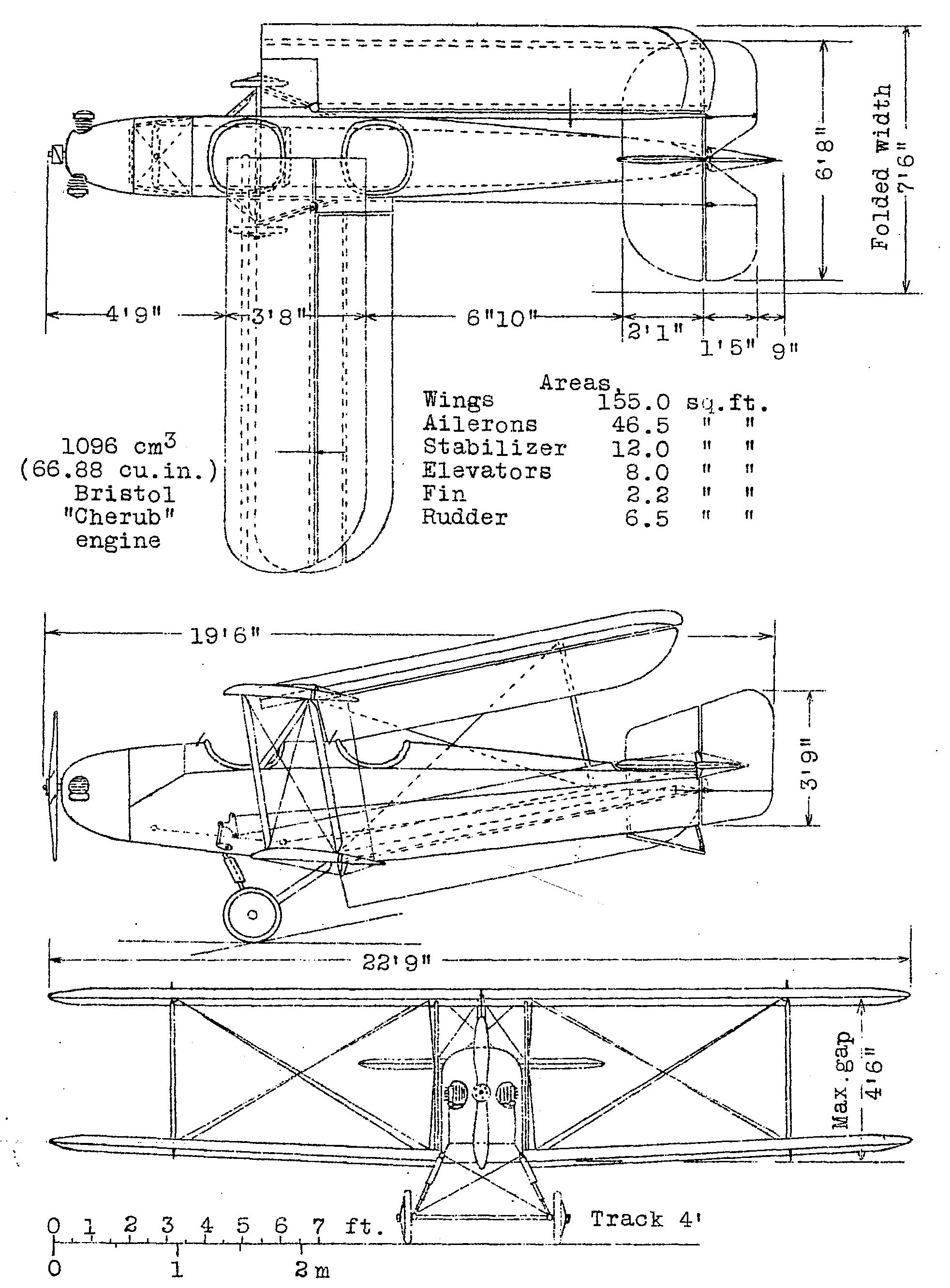
Westland Wood Pigeon 3-view drawing from NACA-TM-289

Data from

General characteristics

- Crew: two
- Length: 19 ft 6 in (5.95 m)
- Wingspan: 22 ft 9 in (6.94 m)
- Empty weight: 439 lb (199 kg)
- Gross weight: 779 lb (353 kg)
- Powerplant: 1 × Bristol Cherub III , 32 hp (24 kW)

Performance

- Maximum speed: 72 mph (115 km/h, 63 kn)
