= Gloster Gannet =

Early British light aircraft

Gannet
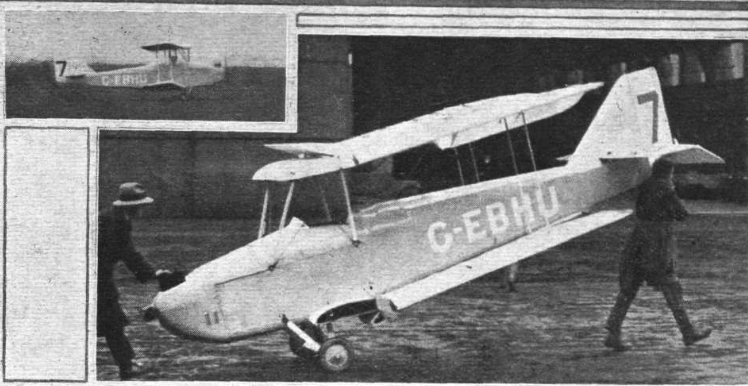
- Gannet with Carden engine

General information
- Type: light aircraft
- National origin: United Kingdom
- Manufacturer: Gloucestershire Aircraft Company
- Designer: H.P.Folland
- Number built: 1

History
- First flight: 23 October 1923

The Gloster Gannet was a single-seat single-engined light aircraft built by the Gloucestershire Aircraft Company Limited of Cheltenham, United Kingdom, to compete in the 1923 Lympne Trials. Engine development problems prevented it from taking part.

== Development ==
In 1923 the Royal Aero Club (RAeC) organised what became known as the Lympne light aircraft trials after the airfield where they were based, though the RAeC referred to the competing aircraft as motor-gliders. The intention was to develop economical private aviation, so the engine size was limited to 750 cc with immediate consequences for aircraft size and weight. Various sponsors provided attractive prizes, particularly the total of £1500 jointly from the Duke of Sutherland and the Daily Mail. The event took place from 8–13 October 1923.

The Gannet was Gloster's intended entry. It was a small, single-bay biplane, one of the smallest aircraft built in Britain. It was powered by a specially designed Carden vertical two-cylinder air-cooled two-stroke engine of exactly 750 cc.

The thick wings were based on a pair of spruce I-section spars with spruce ribs and internal wire bracing. The inner section and interplane struts were of streamlined steel tube; ailerons were carried on upper and lower wings. The Lympne aircraft were aimed at the private owner, for whom transport and storage might be an important issue, so the Gannet's wings were hinged at the rear spar so they could be folded back along the fuselage. Both wing centre section trailing edges folded to permit the wing-folding; the upper section was also folded up to aid access to the cockpit. The 2 imp. gallon (9.1 litre) fuel tank was in the upper centre section.

The fuselage was constructed around ash longerons, with plywood sides and fabric top and bottom. The undercarriage was joined to the centre section via a V-shaped pair of struts, had a single axle and, initially very small wheels.

Unfortunately for Gloster, the Carden engine had not had time for proper development and overheating and lubrication problems prevented the Gannet from flying at Lympne, though it was present, registered as G-EBHU and bearing Trials number 7. The photographic evidence shows it was either flying or making fast ground runs by then, though James gives the first flight date as either 23 October or 23 November.

The following year the Gannet was re-engined with a 7 hp (5.2 kW) Blackburne Tomtit inverted V-twin. It was also fitted with larger diameter wheels. It seems to have remained airworthy until permanently withdrawn from use on 25 January 1928, but Gloster did not enter it into the two other Lympne light aircraft trials held in 1924 and 1926. It appeared at the Olympia Aero show in 1929 and went for scrap in 1932.

== Specifications (Blackburne powered) ==
Data from James 1971, p. 96

General characteristics

- Crew: 1
- Length: 16 ft 6 in (5.02 m)
- Wingspan: 18 ft 0 in (5.4 m)
- Height: 6 ft 0 in (1.82 m)
- Wing area: 103 sq ft (9.56 m^{2})
- Empty weight: 330 lb (149 kg)
- Gross weight: 460 lb (208 kg)
- Powerplant: 1 × 698 cc 2-cylinder inverted V air-cooled Blackburne Tomtit , 7 hp (5.2 kW)

Performance

- Maximum speed: 72 mph (115 km/h, 63 kn)
- Range: 140 mi (225 km, 120 nmi)
- Rate of climb: 133 ft/min (0.68 m/s) to 4,000 ft (1,220 m)
