= De Havilland DH.53 Humming Bird =

1920s British light aircraft

DH.53 Humming Bird
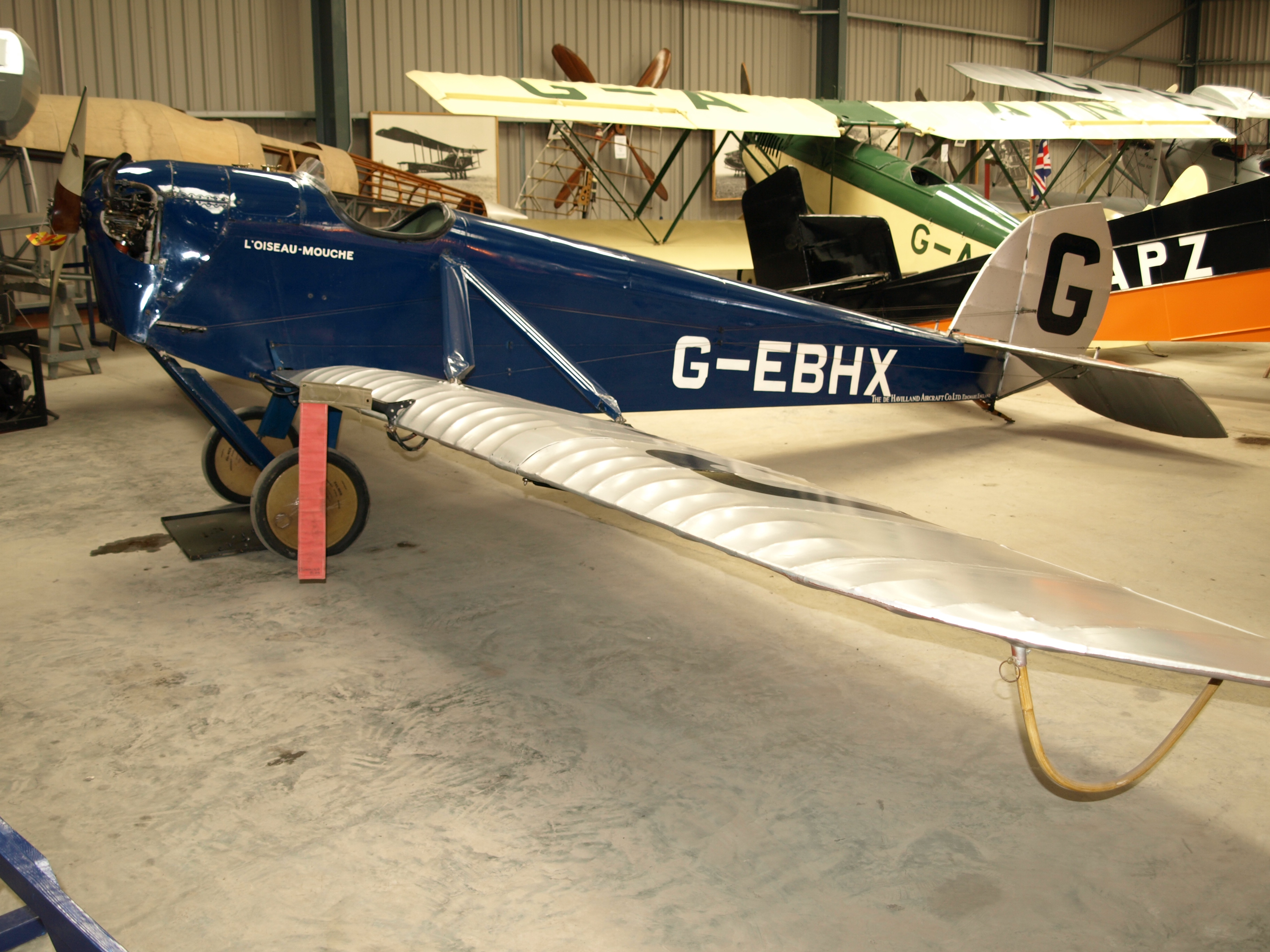

General information
- Type: Ultralight monoplane
- Manufacturer: de Havilland
- Primary user: Royal Air Force
- Number built: 15

History
- Manufactured: 1923–1924
- First flight: 2 October 1923

The de Havilland DH.53 Humming Bird is a British single-seat, single-engine, low-wing monoplane light aircraft first flown in the 1920s.

== Design and development ==
In response to the Daily Mail Light Aeroplane Competition of 1923, de Havilland built two DH.53s which were named Humming Bird and Sylvia II. The DH.53 was a low-wing single-seat monoplane powered by a Douglas 750 cc (46 cu in) motorcycle engine. At Lympne, in October 1923, the DH.53s did not win any prizes but gave an impressive performance. After the trial, Humming Bird was reengined with a 26 hp (19 kW) Blackburne Tomtit two-cylinder engine, and fitted with a revised undercarriage. The Air Ministry became interested in the design and ordered eight Tomtit-powered aircraft in 1924 as communications and training aircraft for the Royal Air Force.

Early in 1924 twelve aircraft were built at Stag Lane Aerodrome and were named Humming Bird after the first prototype. Eight aircraft were for the Air Ministry order, three were for export to Australia, and one was exported to Avia in Prague. One further aircraft was later built for an order from Russia.

== Operational service ==
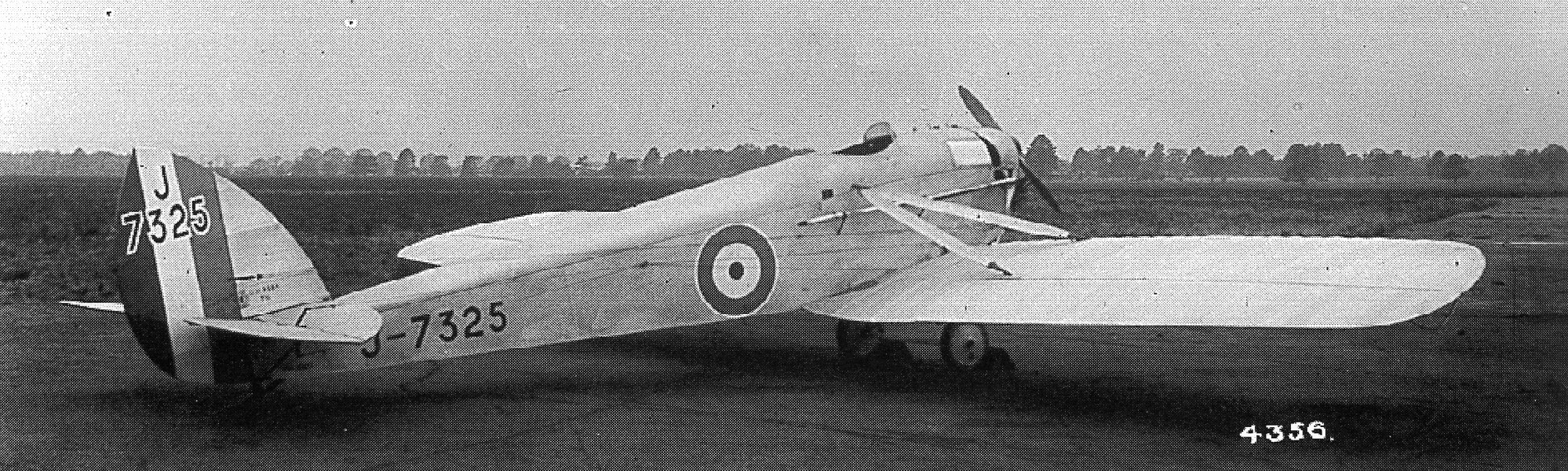
Royal Air Force Humming Bird

The first six aircraft for the Royal Air Force all made their public debut at the 1925 display at RAF Hendon, where they were raced against each other. The last two aircraft would later be used for "parasite aircraft" trials being launched from below an airship – the R.33. The aircraft were retired in 1927 and all eight were sold as civil aircraft.

== Operators ==
United Kingdom

- Royal Air Force

== Aircraft on display ==
- G-EBHX, the prototype, was airworthy and on display at the Shuttleworth Collection but crashed on 1 July 2012, killing the pilot. The airframe has since been rebuilt to airworthy condition and was returned to the Shuttleworth Collection in 2020 for completion.
- J7326 G-EBQP is privately owned and airworthy and flew for the first time at the Shuttleworth Collection on 26 February 2026. It had been displayed at the De Havilland Aircraft Museum.

== Specifications ==
Data from British Civil Aircraft since 1919 Vol 2,

General characteristics

- Crew: 1
- Length: 19 ft 8 in (5.99 m)
- Wingspan: 30 ft 1 in (9.17 m)
- Height: 7 ft 3 in (2.21 m)
- Wing area: 125 sq ft (11.6 m^{2})
- Airfoil: RAF 15 modified
- Empty weight: 326 lb (148 kg)
- Gross weight: 565 lb (256 kg)
- Powerplant: 1 × Blackburne Tomtit V-2 inverted air-cooled piston engine, 26 hp (19 kW)
- Propellers: 2-bladed fixed-pitch propeller

Performance

- Maximum speed: 73 mph (117 km/h, 63 kn)
- Cruise speed: 60 mph (97 km/h, 52 kn)
- Range: 130 mi (210 km, 110 nmi)
- Service ceiling: 15,000 ft (4,600 m)
- Rate of climb: 225 ft/min (1.14 m/s)
- Wing loading: 4.52 lb/sq ft (22.1 kg/m^{2})
- Power/mass: 0.046 hp/lb (0.076 kW/kg)

== See also ==
Related development

- RAE Scarab

Related lists

- List of aircraft of the Royal Air Force
