= List of British gliders =

This is a list of gliders/sailplanes of the world, (this reference lists all gliders with references, where available) Note: Any aircraft can glide for a short time, but gliders are designed to glide for longer.

== British miscellaneous constructors ==
- Aeronca C-2 glider
- Airdisco Phi-Phi – Aircraft Disposal Company
- Armstrong-Whitworth A.W.52G
- Birmingham Guild BG-100
- Birmingham Guild BG-135
- Bolton 1932
- Bramingham 1934
- Breeze Oozle Bird
- Bristol Glider (1910)
- Broburn Wanderlust – Broburn Sailplanes Ltd, Woodley
- Brokker (glider)
- Brown 1931 glider
- Chard Osprey – Keith Chard
- Cody UK Aircraft n°1 glider
- Colditz Cock
- Cramlington Cramcraft – Cramlington Aircraft Ltd
- Czerwiński-Shenstone Harbinger – Beverley Shenstone and Waclaw Czerwiński
- Davies Glider-1
- Davies Glider-2
- Davis-Costin Condor
- Davis Condor 2
- de Havilland DH.52 – de Havilland Aircraft Co
- Dickson Primary - Devon Gliding Club
- Dorsling 1932 glider – Dorset Gliding Club
- Dunning 1934 glider – Dunning, Southdown Gliding Club
- Edgley EA-9 Optimist – ESL (Edgley Sailplanes Ltd) & EAL (Edgley Aeronautics Ltd) – Edgley, John
- Eggleton 1912
- Enser Mk.1 – Enser, F.G.
- Etheridge 1933 – Day, S. & Etheridge, C. & Etheridge, P.
- Europa MG – Europa Management Ltd
- Farrar-McFarlane biplace – Farrar, D. J. & McFarlane, L. G.
- Gardner Cumulus – Gardner, L.
- Ginn-Lesniak Kestrel – Ginn, Vic & Lesniak – London Gliding Club, Dunstable
- Godwin Two-seater glider – Godwin, C. G.
- Gordon England 1922 glider – Gordon England, E. C – Georges England Ltd, Walton-on-Thames, Surrey
- Handasyde 1922 glider – Handasyde, G.A. & Raynham, F. P. & Camm, Sydney – Air Navigation Co, Addlestone, Vhertsey, Surrey
- Handley Page glider 1909
- Hewitt 1909 glider- Hewitt, V. V. D.
- Hick Merlin – Hick, W. Eddie, Newcastle Gliding Club
- Holdsworth 1929 glider – Holdsworth, H.
- Holdsworth 1931 glider – Holdsworth, H.
- Holmes KH-1 – Kenneth Holmes
- Hulton 1969 hang glider
- IOW Club glider – Isle of Wight gliding club
- Jefferson 1933 glider – Jefferson, G. Fearnville Grove, Roundhay, Leeds
- Keith-Weiss Aviette – Keith, Alexander & WEISS, José
- Kenilworth Me7
- KL biplane glider
- Latimer-Needham Albatross – Latimer-Needham, C. H. – R.F.D. Co, Guilford
- Lee-Richards 1912 glider
- Leeming L.P.W.
- Lightwing Type 4 Rooster
- Liverpuffin – Sherwin – man-powered glider
- Lowe-Wylde Columbus – Lowe-Wylde, Charles H.
- McAvoy MPA-1 – man-powered aircraft
- McIntyre Airglow – Mac Intyre, John & Mac Intyre, Mark
- Merriam 1922 glider – Merriam, Capt F. W.
- Midland Sailplane – Midland Gliding Club
- Miles M.76 Durestos Glider Wing – F.G. Miles Ltd.
- Monk Pegasus
- Moore Gypsy – The Birmingham Guild Ltd.
- Mulliners Aeroplane
- Norfolk 1936 glider – Norfolk Gliding Club, Skeyton
- Nyborg T.G.N.1 – Nyborg T. G.
- Oxford Club 1930 glider – Oxford Gliding Club
- Payne Granta – Payne, A. G.
- Payne I.C.1 – Payne, J. H. – Imperial College, London
- Peak 100 – The Bedford Sailplane Design Group – Peak Sailplanes Ltd.
- Peak 200 – Mitchelmore, P.
- Penrose Pegasus – Penrose, Harald J.
- Perkins Reluctant Phoenix – Perkins, Daniel – man-powered aircraft
- Porte-Pirie 1909 glider – John Cyrill Porte and Pirie
- Puffin 1 – man-powered aircraft
- Puffin 2 – man-powered aircraft
- Radlock Trainer – Raddings, J. E. & Locke, W. E. – Hull Gliding Club, Hedon, Yorkshire
- Reid Small Glider – Reid, J. A. I.
- Renaut Primary
- Reynard R.4 Primary – Reynard, – Reynard Glider Construction Co, Aylestone, Leicester
- Reynolds R.4 Primary
- Ridley 1910 glider – Ridley, C.
- Robertson Bamboo – Robertson, A.
- Ryley Dragon-Fly 1914 – Ryley, Leslie G. – Ryley, Leslie G., Coventry Aero Club
- Sayers SCW – Sayers, W. H. & Courtney, & Wright – Central Aircraft Company
- Searby Special – Searby, H. A.
- Sellars KJS-1 – Sellars, J. L. & Jordan, K.
- Shackleton Lark – Shackleton, William Stancliffe
- Sigma
- Smith Norbet 1923
- Southdown Aero Services Colditz Cock replica
- Sproule-Ivanoff Camel – Sproule, J. S. & Ivanoff, A. – Scott Light Aircraft Ltd
- Stedman TS-1 City of Leeds – Stedman, R. F. – Stedman R. F. / Bradford & County Gliding Club
- Swales SD3-15 – Swales Developments
- Technicair Trainee – Technicair Ltd. Heston, Middlesex
- Timmins 1930 glider – Timmins, Dennis
- To Phoenix Inflatable – To, Frederick E. – Phoenix Team – Man powered aircraft
- Toucan 1 – Hertfordshire Pedal Aeronauts – man powered aircraft
- Turkey Buzzard
- Vaughan 1909 glider – Vaughn, Horace
- Watson-Northrop 1929 – Watson, J. P.
- Wenham Multiplane 1858
- Westmacott Skylark – Westmacott, R. J. & Westmacott, K.
- Wilkinson Mk 1
- Wilkinson Mk 2
- Wright Falcon
- Yorkshire Sailplanes YS-53 Sovereign
- Yorkshire Sailplanes YS-55 Consort
