= Barton-Le-Clay Airfield =

Coordinates: 51.9728°N 0.4363°W

- IATA: none; ICAO: none

Summary
- Location: Barton-Le-Clay
- Opened: 1935
- Closed: November 1945
- Interactive map of Barton-Le-Clay Airfield

Barton-Le-Clay Airfield (Barton In The Clay Aerodrome) was first established in 1935 to the west of the village, on farmland owned by the nearby Brook End Green Farm. Its first residents were the newly formed Luton Aircraft Limited and The Dunstable Sailplane Company, both companies co-owned by W.L. Manuel and C.H. Latimer-Needham.

Before the mid-1960s Barton-Le-Clay was called Barton In The Clay but the name was changed to the current form by the Parish Council of the time. All references and documentation prior to this date will be in the original village name.

Luton Aircraft commenced construction of its two first aircraft under the management of W.L. Manuel, the Luton Buzzard and the Luton Minor. They were completed ready for flight on 12 December 1935 and 11 July 1936 respectively. In late 1936 the company moved from Barton-Le-Clay to new premises named The Phoenix Works on Oxford Rd, Gerrards Cross, after a fire substantially damaged the workshop building and contents.

The Dunstable Sailplane Company had started life just a year before, building and repairing gliders in the village of Hockliffe south west of Barton-Le-Clay. Most of the company's clients were from the recently formed and nearby London Gliding Club, from whose hangars Manuel had previously been working.

Marendaz Aircraft came to Barton-Le-Clay airfield in 1937, formed by D.M.K. Marendaz in 1936 from the remains of Marendaz Special Cars Ltd at the Cornwallis Works, Maidenhead to manufacture aircraft. Production of the company's first aircraft had been severely damaged in a fire and the work to rebuild was priority after the move. The Marendaz Mk3 was registered as G-AFGG on 23 March 1938; a second aircraft called the Marendaz Trainer was registered as G-AFZX on 31 October 1939.

The Bedford School of Flying was granted licence on 1 January 1938 and the Flying school formed on 14 January 1938, training of a large number of CAG members (as many as 500). The airfield's day-to-day management was handled by International Aircraft & Engineering Ltd which, like the Bedford School of Flying, was owned by D.M.K. Marendaz and Dorothy Summers. The School operated until 1940.

On 22 July 1940 No 24 Elementary Flying Training School (EFTS) was established at Luton and Barton-le-clay was assigned as a Relief Training Ground as the main Luton airfield became more congested. When the EFTS relocated, Luton airfield became the home of No 5 Ferry Pool, an all-women group of the Air Transport Auxiliary (ATA), who also used Barton-le-Clay as its Relief Training Ground. No.5 Ferry Pool had relocated from the Hatfield de Havilland Aircraft Company factory site and later moved operations to Haddenham, Buckinghamshire (RAF Thame), in 1943 though they retained use of the Barton-Le-Clay airfield, transporting student pilots by bus each day until the ATA disbanded at the end of November 1945.

Barton-le-Clay airfield returned to civil use post 1945, with the grass airstrip being returned to agriculture and the buildings being occupied for industrial use.

The airfield has an active research group which documents its findings on the Barton-Le-Clay Community Website.
