= Clarke Cheetah =

Cheetah

General information
- Type: Single-seat sports aircraft
- National origin: United Kingdom
- Designer: John Clarke
- Number built: 1

History
- First flight: Summer 1929
- Retired: 1936

The Clarke Cheetah was a single-engined amateur built aircraft built in the UK using some parts from a de Havilland Humming Bird to produce a machine that could fly either as a biplane or as a parasol winged monoplane. The single example flew for five years before being converted again in 1936.

== Design and development ==
Relatively few aircraft have been designed to be convertible from biplanes to monoplanes and back again. One such convertible was the Parnall Pixie III, designed to compete at the Lympne light aircraft trials; another was the Clarke Cheetah. This was amateur built by F/O John Clarke, who had done an apprenticeship at the Royal Air Force School of Technical Training at RAF Halton before going to RAF College Cranwell.

Clarke's contacts served him well, for the Cheetah incorporated parts from at least two other aircraft. The upper wing came from a DH.53, so that the Cheetah flew with a parasol wing from a low-wing monoplane. Such a move meant that Clarke had to provide a previously non-existent centre section. About three years later, the RAE Scarab took DH53 wings for use on this permanently parasol winged monoplane, again creating a new centre section. The lower wings came from Clarke's former base at Halton, from the sesquiplane Halton Mayfly. This aircraft was in 1928 transformed into a parasol monoplane (the Halton Minus) and so there was a set of short and narrow chord wings spare. When rigged as a monoplane, the Cheetah had a pair of parallel lift struts on each side from the lower fuselage longeron to the two wing spars not far outboard. There was also a pair of inverted V cabane struts supporting the centre section. To convert to a biplane (strictly a sesquiplane) the lower wings were attached to the fuselage at the base of the lift struts and supported by the original, unusual, integral asymmetric X interplane struts from the Mayfly, running out and down from the top of the lift struts at about 45DEG to meet their own wing well outboard.

The Cheetah also adopted a DH.53 empennage, as the Scarab did later. The fuselage, as with the Scarab, was new; a wooden wire braced structure, canvas covered was used in place of the plywood covered spruce members used in the DH.53. There was a single open cockpit at the trailing edge of the (upper) wing, which had a slight cut-out in the new centre section for visibility, and a new single axle undercarriage mounted on legs to the lower longerons with rearward bracing. Power came from a 35 hp (26 kW) Blackburne Thrush three cylinder radial, mounted in the inverted-Y orientation and driving a two-bladed propeller.

== Operational history ==
The Cheetah first flew in the summer of 1929 and gained its Certificate of Airworthiness on 17 September, registered as G-AAJK. Clarke did not live to enjoy his aeroplane, dying the following month in an RAF crash. It passed to Malcolm Hamilton, who took it to the Suffolk Aero Club's meeting in June 1930. It was then sold on to A.C.Thomas and three other airmen of 600 City of London Squadron at RAF Tangmere, who flew it as both biplane and monoplane for about four years. In 1935 it was briefly owned by F.G.Miles and whilst in his care observers noted the difficulty the little engine had in moving the aircraft over bumpy ground. It seems Miles sold the Cheetah in May 1936 to Richard Hopkinson for £10, who converted it into a low-winged monoplane called the Martin Monoplane. Since the Cheetah's wings and tail came from the low winged DH.53, it is not surprising that this final version, re-registered as G-AEYY, looked very similar to its source machine.

== Specifications ==
Data from Ord-Hume 2000, pp. 299

General characteristics

- Crew: 1
- Length: 19 ft 10 in (6.05 m)
- Wingspan: 29 ft 0 in (8.84 m)
- Height: 4 ft 8 in (1.42 m)
- Wing area: 114 sq ft (10.6 m^{2})
- Empty weight: 450 lb (204 kg)
- Gross weight: 678 lb (308 kg)
- Powerplant: 1 × Blackburne Thrush 3-cylinder radial, 35 hp (26 kW)
