= The Dunstable Sailplane Company =

The Dunstable Sailplane Company was established in 1934 by W.L. Manuel and C.H. Latimer-Needham to design, manufacture and repair gliders from its workshop at Barton-Le-Clay Airfield in Bedfordshire.

The Dunstable Kestrel was manufactured by the company from designs by W.L. Manuel in 1935; production was limited to one sailplane with a British Gliding Association id of G221. Records comment that G221 was purchased by a trainee pilot who was still in his early stages of training with a primary glider. This Dunstable Kestrel passed to the Norfolk & Norwich Aero Club and crashed in 1938, however W.L. Manuel drew up plans for home builders which were offered for sale at the cost of £6. 6s. W.E. Godson purchased a set of plans and built a second British Kestrel whilst three more Kestrels were built in Australia by R. New, R. Basillie and the last by P. Pratt. Whilst no remains exist of the British built aircraft all three Australian-built ones are in museums.

W. L. Manuel was born William Lancelot Manuel in 1903; parish records list his birthplace as Malling, Kent. Manuel spent his early life working at RAF Hawkinge Kent with 25 Fighter Squadron, He was a key member in the establishment of the Channel Gliding Club (1930), and built an estimated 14 aircraft over his 84-year life. William Manuel retired in 1965 from the AC Cars company of Thames Ditton; it is thought he was the company's chief planning engineer on retirement.
