= Luton Aircraft =

British aircraft manufacturer

Luton Aircraft Limited was a British aircraft manufacturer of Barton-in-the-Clay, Bedfordshire, and later Gerrards Cross, Buckinghamshire.

== History ==
The company was founded to build the designs of C.H. Latimer-Needham and was based at Barton-Le-Clay Airfield, Bedfordshire. The company built two ultralight wooden aircraft designs by C.H. Latimer-Needham in 1936, the Buzzard and L.A.2. The L.A.2 was later rebuilt to become the L.A.3 the prototype for the successful Luton Minor ultralight homebuilt. The company sold the plans for the Luton Minor to homebuilders. In 1937 the L.A.5 Major was developed, it was a larger high-wing aircraft, only one was built.

The company moved to a new factory (the Phoenix Works) in Gerrards Cross, Buckinghamshire, in a site adjacent to (and leased from) a garage on the A40 London-Oxford road. The company closed down when the works were destroyed by fire in 1943. In 1958 the designer C.H. Latimer-Needham and A.W.J.G Ord-Hume formed Phoenix Aircraft Limited who acquired the design rights for both the Minor and Major. Latimer-Needham further improved both designs to be sold as plans for homebuilders.

== Aircraft ==
- 1936 – Luton L.A.1 Buzzard I
- 1936 – Luton L.A.2
- 1936 – Luton L.A.3 Minor
- 1936 – Luton L.A.4 Minor
- 1937 – Luton Buzzard II
- 1939 – Luton L.A.5 Major
