= List of gliders (Y) =

This is a list of gliders/sailplanes of the world, (this reference lists all gliders with references, where available) Note: Any aircraft can glide for a short time, but gliders are designed to glide for longer.

== Y ==
=== Yakovlev ===
(Aleksander Yakovlev)

- Yakovlev AMF-10
- Yakovlev AMF-20
- Yakovlev Yak-14
- Yakovlev APS-10

=== Yakstas ===
( Adolfo Yakstas)

- Yakstas Halcón I
- Yakstas Halcón IIa
- Yakstas Halcón III

=== Yamasaki ===
(Yoshio Yamasaki / Itoh Hikoki Aviation)

- Iton D-1
- Itoh C-6

=== Yuneec International ===
(Yuneec International Ltd, Kunshan, Jiangsu, China)

- Yuneec International EViva

=== Yalo S.C. ===
(Yalo S.C. from Nowy Dwór Mazowiecki)

- Yalo Moto-Bocian

=== Yeremeyev ===
( P. Yeremeyev)

- Yeremeyev Stalinets-4

=== Yildiz ===
(Ali Yildiz)

- Yildiz 1928 glider

=== Yokosuka ===
(Yokosuka Technical Arsenal aka Kyushu)

- Yokosuka MXY5
- Yokosuka MXY8 (glider version of Mitsubishi J8M)
- Yokosuka Shinryu

=== Yorkshire Sailplanes ===
- Yorkshire Sailplanes YS-53 Sovereign
- Yorkshire Sailplanes YS-55 Consort
