= Luton Buzzard =

Buzzard
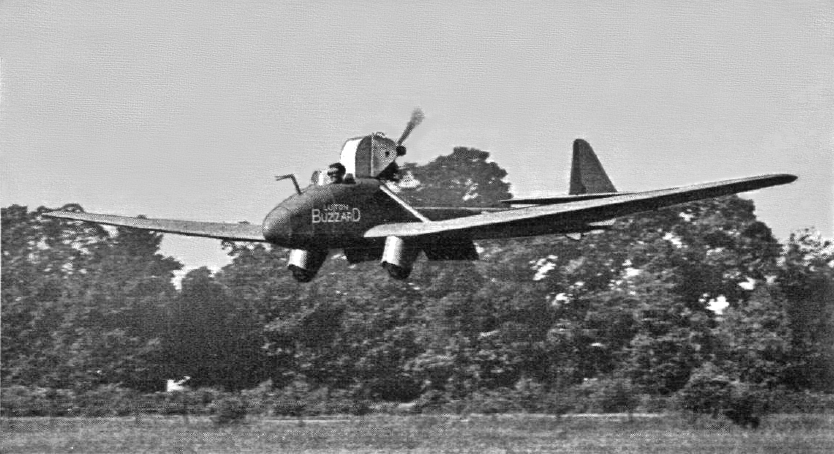
- Luton Buzzard (G-ADYX), Barton-in-the-Clay, August 1936

General information
- Type: Ultralight
- Manufacturer: Luton Aircraft Limited
- Designer: C.H. Latimer-Needham
- Number built: 1

History
- First flight: 1936

The Luton Buzzard was a 1930s British single-seat, open cockpit ultralight aircraft built by Luton Aircraft Limited.

== History ==
The Buzzard was a single-seat ultralight of wooden construction, fitted with split flaps and an all-flying tailplane, and powered by a 35 hp Anzani inverted Vee air-cooled engine. The Buzzard was designed by C.H. Latimer-Needham, and built by Luton Aircraft at Barton-in-the-Clay, Bedfordshire in 1936. The only Buzzard, registered G-ADYX and designated the Buzzard I first flew in 1936. On 16 November 1936, it was damaged during landing at Christchurch, Hampshire.

In 1937, it was rebuilt as the Buzzard II with short-span wings, enclosed cockpit and an orthodox tailplane. On 8 May 1938, it was damaged beyond repair while being demonstrated at a Royal Aeronautical Society 'garden party' at Great West Aerodrome. In 1943, the aircraft remains were destroyed when the company's Phoenix Works at Gerrards Cross burnt down.

== Variants ==
Buzzard I
Prototype open cockpit ultralight, one built.
Buzzard II
Buzzard I rebuilt with enclosed cockpit and other modifications.

== Specifications (Buzzard II) ==
Data from British Civil Aircraft since 1919 Volume 3, Jane's All the World's Aircraft 1938

General characteristics

- Crew: 1
- Length: 21 ft 6 in (6.55 m)
- Wingspan: 35 ft 6 in (10.82 m)
- Width: 7 ft 6 in (2.29 m) wings detached
- Height: 6 ft 6 in (1.98 m)
- Empty weight: 400 lb (181 kg)
- Gross weight: 620 lb (281 kg)
- Fuel capacity: 5 imp gal (6 US gal; 23 L) fuel tank behind the cockpit
- Powerplant: 1 × British Anzani 35hp V-2 inverted air-cooled piston engine, 35 hp (26 kW)
- Propellers: 2-bladed fixed-pitch pusher propeller

Performance

- Maximum speed: 95 mph (153 km/h, 83 kn)
- Cruise speed: 81 mph (130 km/h, 70 kn)
- Stall speed: 30 mph (48 km/h, 26 kn)
- Range: 180 mi (290 km, 160 nmi)
- Endurance: 4 hours
- Rate of climb: 400 ft/min (2.0 m/s)
