= Manuel Wren =

British single-seat glider, 1931

Wren
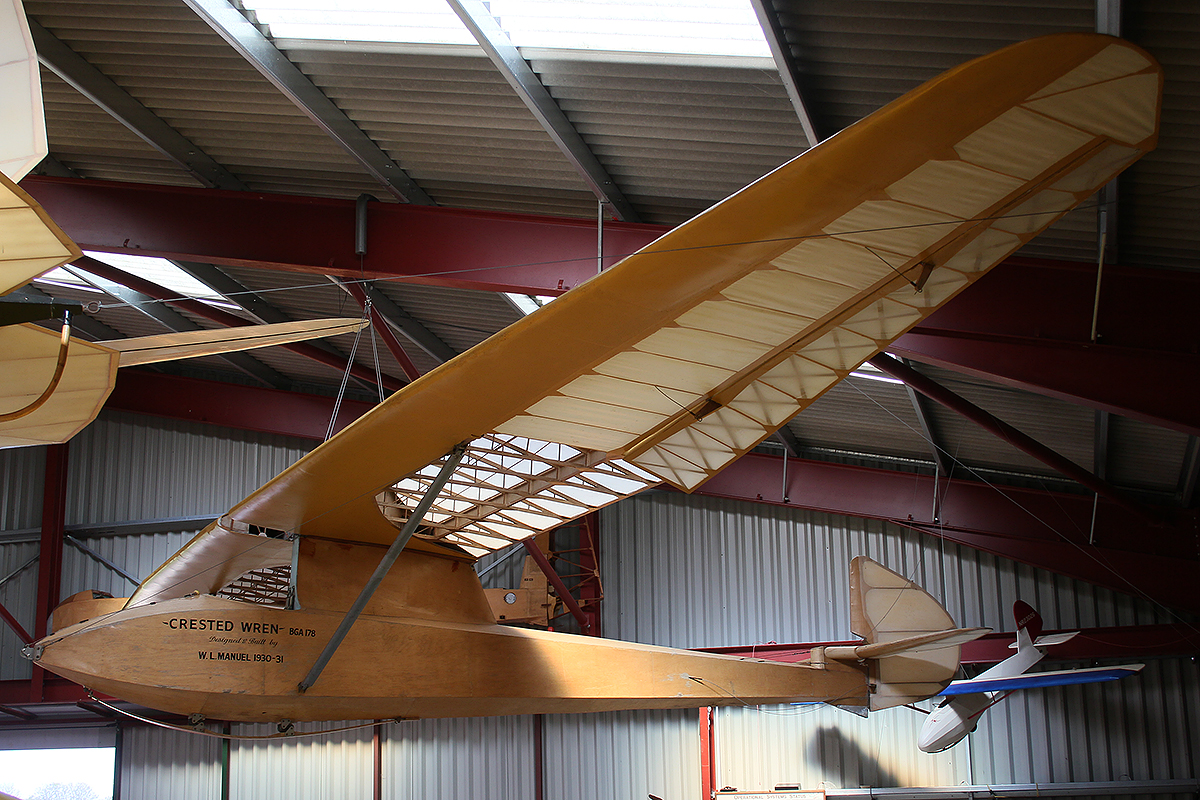

General information
- Type: Single seat sailplane
- National origin: UK
- Designer: W. L. Manuel
- Number built: 13, all variants included

History
- First flight: July 1931

The Manuel Crested and Willow Wrens formed a series of wooden, single-seat gliders designed in the UK by W. L. Manuel in the early 1930s, intended for slope soaring. Some were built by the designer, others from plans he supplied. The Dunstable Kestrel was a further development.

== Design and development ==
The Crested Wren was the first of the series, its design influenced by contemporary German practice. It was built by Manuel. Its two-piece wings had single spars which, together with plywood wing coverings forward of them, formed D-shaped box girders. The wooden ribs were produced in batches with a method devised by Manuel. Behind the spar the wings were fabric covered. The wings, which were slightly swept about the spars, had a constant-chord centre section, tapering outboard with ailerons and rounded tips. There were no flaps or airbrakes. The wings were mounted on a fuselage pylon and had lift struts from the lower fuselage. Two flying wires from the nose assisted with drag or torsional loads.

The Crested Wren's fuselage was a plywood-skinned hexagonal structure, its vertical faces longer than the others. It curved to a point at the nose, where the flying wires and tow rope were attached, and tapered gently towards the tail. The open, unscreened cockpit was under the wing leading edge immediately forward of the pylon. A rubber-sprung ash landing skid with a steel sole ran from the nose to below the trailing edge. There were no fixed tail surfaces: separate rounded elevators were mounted on a little pedestal and a roughly D-shaped rudder moved between them. The elevator control wires emerged from the fuselage midway between the wing and the tail.

The first flight of the Crested Wren was in July 1931. After soaring flights over the South Downs, Manuel designed and built a developed version named the Willow Wren. This was very similar to the Crested Wren but had a deeper cockpit which left the pilot less exposed. The tail surfaces were also revised, with a single-piece elevator with a straighter leading edge and a taller, deeper rudder. The elevator modification allowed the control wires to run within the fuselage. The deeper rudder added 35 mm (1.4 in) to the glider's length but all other dimensions were the same. The redesign increased the empty weight by about 20 lb (9 kg). The Willow Wren prototype first flew in December 1932.

The Willow Wrens built from plans most acquired individual names based on their colour schemes: BGA 202, for example, was the Golden Wren. Different constructors introduced their own modifications; the Golden Wren had an enclosed cockpit, ailerons with prominent rounded trailing edges and fuselage stiffening; the White Wren had dihedral. Both had also a transparency in the leading edge to provide an upwards view from the cockpit. Manuel too made changes to his second Willow Wren, the Blue Wren, giving the outer wing washout to improve the stall behaviour.

A final development was the Dunstable Kestrel, with the same wing as the Blue Wren, a fuselage 4 in (102 mm) shorter and 35 lb (16 kg) heavier empty. It built by The Dunstable Sailplane Company which Manuel now had joined.

== Operational history ==
Manuel sold the Crested Wren, which remained active until at least 1938. In 1986, aged 83, he built a non-flying replica.

The first Willow Wren, BGA 162 and known as the Yellow Wren despite being painted green for part of its life remained active, after restoration by Manuel in 1964, into the 1970s, becoming the oldest airworthy glider in the UK. Manuel built a second example which went to South Africa, eventually crashing in 1949. Four other Willow Wrens were built to plans sold by Manuel, three in the UK and one in Australia.

Only one Dunstable Kestrel was factory built. Another Kestrel was constructed from plans in the UK, one in the USA and three more in Australia. The UK plan-built Kestrel crashed at the National Championships in 1939, killing its constructor.

== Aircraft on display ==
The Yellow Wren was acquired and restored by the late Mike Beach and others in the mid-1990s and was sold to Brooklands Museum in Surrey in 1998. It is on display at the Gliding Heritage Centre.

== Variants ==
Data from Ellison

Crested Wren
The first of the series. Only one built, often known as the Red Wren and later registered as BGA 178.

Willow Wren
Refined version with modified empennage and rear fuselage allowing internal elevator control wires. Deeper cockpit. Six built.

Dunstable Kestrel
1935 development of the Willow Wren designed and built by the Dunstable Sailplane Co. Same wing dimensions, slightly shorter and heavier. Six built.

== Specifications (Willow Wren) ==
Data from British Gliders and Sailplanes 1971 p.143-4

General characteristics

- Crew: 1
- Length: 20 ft 4 in (6.20 m)
- Wingspan: 40 ft 0 in (12.19 m)
- Wing area: 150 sq ft (14 m^{2})
- Aspect ratio: 12
- Airfoil: Göttingen 549
- Empty weight: 210 lb (95 kg)
- Gross weight: 345 lb (156 kg)

== See also ==
Related lists

- List of gliders
