= Luton Major =

L.A.5 Major
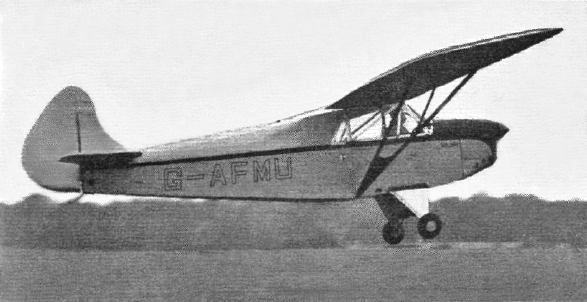
- Luton LA.5 Major, 1939

General information
- Type: Two-seat cabin monoplane
- Manufacturer: Homebuilt
- Designer: C.H. Latimer-Needham

History
- First flight: 12 March 1939

The Luton L.A.5 Major was a 1930s British two-seat high-wing cabin monoplane. Following World War II, plans were made available to suit construction as a homebuilt aircraft.

== History ==
The original L.A.5 Major was a two-seat light aircraft powered by a 62 hp Walter Mikron II engine. It was designed by C.H. Latimer-Needham, and built in 1939 by Luton Aircraft Limited at its Phoenix Works, Gerrards Cross, Buckinghamshire. The prototype (G-AFMU), designated L.A.5 Major, first flew on 12 March 1939. During 1943, the Phoenix Works burnt down, destroying the prototype, and causing the Luton Aircraft company to close.

After World War II, Phoenix Aircraft Limited, formed by the designer C.H. Latimer-Needham and A.W.J.G. Ord-Hume, took over the design rights for the Luton Major. Latimer-Needham updated the design to make it more suitable for homebuilding, in which form it has become L.A.5A Major, with plans marketed by Falconar Avia of Edmonton, Alberta, Canada as the Cubmajor. An open cockpit version is marketed as the Majorette.

== Variants ==
L.A.5 Major
Prototype, one built.
L.A.5A Major
Updated homebuilt version, all homebuilt.
Falconar Cubmajor
Version marketed in kit and plans form by Falconar Avia
Falconar Majorette
Version with open cockpit marketed in kit and plans form by Falconar Avia

== Specifications (L.A.5) ==
Data from Jane's All the World's Aircraft 1958-59

General characteristics

- Crew: 1
- Capacity: 1
- Length: 23 ft 9 in (7.24 m)
- Wingspan: 35 ft 2 in (10.72 m)
- Wing area: 163 sq ft (15.1 m^{2})
- Airfoil: RAF 48
- Empty weight: 600 lb (272 kg)
- Gross weight: 1,030 lb (467 kg)
- Fuel capacity: 11 imp gal (13 US gal; 50 L)
- Powerplant: 1 × Walter Mikron II 4-cylinder air-cooled inverted in-line piston engine, 62 hp (46 kW)
- Propellers: 2-bladed

Performance

- Maximum speed: 105 mph (169 km/h, 91 kn)
- Cruise speed: 95 mph (153 km/h, 83 kn)
- Stall speed: 35 mph (56 km/h, 30 kn)
- Range: 300 mi (480 km, 260 nmi)
- Rate of climb: 700 ft/min (3.6 m/s)

== Bibliography ==
- Jackson, A.J. (1974). British Civil Aircraft since 1919 Volume 3. Putnam ISBN 0-370-10014-X
