= Lightwing Rooster =

Rooster

General information
- Type: Experimental, optionally powered biplane glider
- National origin: United Kingdom
- Designer: John M. Lee
- Number built: 1

History
- First flight: 1983
- Retired: 1990

The Lightwing Type 4 Rooster is an experimental biplane glider, capable of powered or unpowered flight, built in the UK in the 1980s to explore the properties of this unusual glider configuration.

== Design and development ==
The Rooster was not intended for production but to explore the soaring performance of a biplane. It is an unequal span biplane, not technically a sesquiplane but with a lower wing with 2/3 the span of the upper one. The aspect ratio of the latter is 10, that of the lower about 6.7 and both planes are unswept with constant chord. The wings are wood framed and fabric covered, with the lower ones mounted on the lower fuselage longerons and the upper on a short, thin pedestal from the fuselage top. There are two short, faired wing struts one each side, one from mid-fuselage to the upper wing another, crossing just ahead of the first, from the top of the pedestal to the lower wing.

The fuselage of the Rooster is a simple, fabric covered rectangular structure, with a simple, straight edged, cruciform tail unit, the tailplane mounted just above the upper fuselage. The region around the upper wing pylon is faired in, just ahead of a mounting frame for the pusher engine. The fairing extends forwards to the back of the cockpit; originally, this was open but the surviving sole example currently has a single piece canopy. The Rooster has a fixed, conventional undercarriage with small, wing mounted mainwheels, assisted by a small tailskid and a sprung nose skid, reaching back under most of the cockpit.

Following the first flight in 1983 John Lee tested the soaring capabilities of the Rooster with flights from 180 m (600 ft). By the Spring of 1984 he had made some 200 circuits and was going forwards with tests the aircraft's semi-aerobatic abilities. He later turned to the development of his Type 6 monoplane and the Rooster's registration was cancelled in 1990.

== Aircraft on display ==
- Norfolk and Sussex Aviation Museum, Flixton - the sole Rooster, G-MJVI.

== Specifications ==
Data from Jane's All The World's Aircraft 1984-85

General characteristics

- Crew: 1
- Length: 6.40 m (21 ft 0 in)
- Upper wingspan: 9.14 m (30 ft 0 in)
- Lower wingspan: 6.10 m (20 ft 0 in)
- Height: 1.52 m (5 ft 0 in)
- Wing area: 13.94 m^{2} (150.0 sq ft)
- Aspect ratio: 10, upper wing
- Empty weight: 148 kg (326 lb)
- Max takeoff weight: 227 kg (500 lb)
- Fuel capacity: 10 L (2.2 Imp gal; 2.6 US gal)
- Powerplant: 1 × Valmet engine optional
- Propellers: 2-bladed, 1.45 m (4 ft 9 in) diameter pusher, via speed reduction drive

Performance

- Maximum speed: 105 km/h (65 mph, 57 kn)
- Cruise speed: 64 km/h (40 mph, 35 kn) economical
- Stall speed: 33 km/h (21 mph, 18 kn) power on; 46 km/h (28 mph; 25 kn) power off
- Never exceed speed: 120 km/h (75 mph, 65 kn)
- Range: 161 km (100 mi, 87 nmi) maximum fuel
- Endurance: 2 h with maximum fuel
- Wing loading: 16.27 kg/m^{2} (3.33 lb/sq ft)
- Landing run: 23 m (75 ft)
