= Swales SD3-15 =

British single-seat glider, 1975

SD3-15

General information
- Type: Single seat glider
- National origin: United Kingdom
- Manufacturer: Swales Sailplanes

History
- First flight: July 1975
- Developed from: Moore Gypsy, Yorkshire YS 55 Consort

The Swales SD3-15 is an all-metal single-seat glider produced and marketed in the UK in the mid to late 1970s. It was a development of the Moore Gypsy via the Yorkshire YS 55 Consort. The aircraft was intended to appeal to flying clubs and small syndicates to whom its small size, low weight, low cost, and safe flying characteristics would be appealing.

== Design and development ==
The SD3-15 is a cantilever, shoulder-wing monoplane of all-metal construction apart from its GRP nose and wingtips. The cockpit is enclosed by a large, moulded canopy that hinges to starboard. The fuselage is of semi-monocoque construction, built on four longerons, and the constant-chord wings are built on metal and polystyrene ribs. The undercarriage consists of a non-retractable monowheel and a tailskid. The trailing-edge flaps also function as airbrakes.

The prototype SD3-15 was equipped with a V-tail, but a subsequent development was given a T-tail.

In 1973, Yorkshire Sailplanes acquired the manufacturing rights to the Moore Gypsy from The Birmingham Guild. They extended the Gypsy's 12-metre wingspan to 13.5 metres and sold a small number as the YS 55 Consort. When Yorkshire Sailplanes went bankrupt the following year, Swales Sailplanes took up the rights. Construction of a prototype, designated SD3-13V began in September 1974 and it flew the following March.

Swales now further extended the wingspan to 15 metres (an option that had been in the Gypsy design from the outset) and this version first flew in July 1975 as the SD3-15V. The prototype of the T-tail SD3-15T followed in December 1976.

By mid-1979, Swales had built six SD3-15Vs, and one production SD3-15T was under construction. By this time, aircraft were only being built to order, and only the SD3-15T version was still being offered.

== Variants ==
Swales SD3-15V
V-tail version, first flown March 1975. 6 built by 1982
Swales SD3-15T
T-tail version, first flown December 1976

== Specifications (SD3-15T) ==
Data from Hardy 1982, p.124

General characteristics

- Crew: 1
- Length: 20 ft (6.1 m)
- Wingspan: 49 ft 3 in (15.0 m)
- Height: 4 ft 3 in (1.30 m)
- Wing area: 102.0 sq ft (9.48 m^{2})
- Aspect ratio: 23.7
- Airfoil: Wortmann FX61-168
- Empty weight: 490 lb (222 kg)
- Gross weight: 728 lb (330 kg)

Performance

- Maximum speed: 125 mph (201 km/h, 109 kn) (smooth air)
- Stall speed: 75 mph (120 km/h, 65 kn)
- Maximum glide ratio: best 36:1 at 55 mph (88 km/h, 48 kn)
- Rate of sink: 144 ft/min (0.73 m/s) minimum at 48.5 mph (78.1 km/h, 42.1 kn)
- Wing loading: 706 lb/sq ft (3,450 kg/m^{2}) (maximum)

== Bibliography ==
- Coates, Andrew (1978). Jane's World Sailplanes and Motor Gliders. UK: Flying Books.
- Hardy, Michael (1982). Gliders & Sailplanes of the World. London: Ian Allan.
- Taylor, John W R (1975). Jane's All the World's Aircraft 1975-76. London: Jane's Yearbooks.
- Taylor, John W R (1979). Jane's All the World's Aircraft 1979-80. London: Jane's Yearbooks.
