= Brokker (glider) =

General information
- Type: single seat sailplane
- National origin: United Kingdom
- Manufacturer: Alec Gray and W. J. Buchanan
- Number built: 1

History
- First flight: 1922

The Brokker (a nickname which stuck, the glider having no other name) was a single seat glider entered into the first British gliding endurance competition, held at Itford Hill in 1922. It combined the wing of a Fokker D.VII with an engineless Bristol F.2 Fighter fuselage. It flew well in the stiff winds of the last day and achieved the third longest flight.

== Development ==
In August 1922 the Daily Mail newspaper offered a £1,000 prize for the longest duration flight by an unpowered, heavier than air aircraft. The competition was to be organized by the Royal Aero Club, who chose the site (Itford Hill, on the Sussex South Downs near Lewes) and the date (16–21 October). This gave competitors six weeks to design, build and transport their entries. Thirteen arrived in time and one of these was the aircraft nicknamed Brokker, competition number 31.

Initially regarded as something of a joke, the Brokker was, as its name suggested a fusion of a Bristol and a Fokker aircraft. Specifically, the upper wing of a Fokker D.VII was married to the engineless fuselage of a Bristol Fighter. It was put together by Alec Gray and W. J. Buchanan from two of the cheap and unwanted airframes left at the end of World War I; the wings and fuselage each cost 5/- (25 p), with 8/6 (42.5 p) chiefly for dope and plywood, a total of 18/6 or 92.5 p. The Fokker D.VII wing had advantages over most other World War I fighters as it was one of the few to use a thick airfoil. The merits of these only emerged towards the end of the war, and then only in Germany: structurally, they could be internally braced and more importantly they produced lower drag and higher lift, particularly at high angles of attack, than the usual thin wings.

On the Brokker, the D.VII wing was simply clamped to the top of the rectangular cross section Bristol fuselage, forming a high wing cantilever monoplane. Since there was no propeller to need ground clearance, the Fighter's tall undercarriage was replaced with a pair of wheels mounted outside the lower longerons. The now empty nose of the Bristol was enclosed with a new, single curvature fairing.

== Operational history ==
The Brokker arrived late at the Iford meeting and was not flown until the final day. Its first launch was not successful but the next resulted in a flight of over 90 mins ended only by darkness, the third longest flight of the week. The relative steadiness of the heavy Brokker in the strong winds of the last day, compared with all other competitors with their low wing loadings, was noted. Gray received the Royal Aero Club prize of £50 third longest flight.

After the competition Gray took it to Salisbury Plain where he was to conduct tests for the Air Ministry on the suitability of gliders in pilot training programmes. The aircraft was lost in a fatal glider accident on 28 August 1923. The pilot, Neville Charles Waltho, was thrown out of the cockpit when the Brokker stalled on a hillside near Pewsey. It was the first fatal glider accident in England since Percy Pilcher's death in 1899.

== Specifications ==
General characteristics

- Capacity: 1
- Length: 25 ft 10 in (7.87 m) this is the length of a standard Bristol F.2 Fighter; the Brokker would have been shorter
- Wingspan: 29 ft 4 in (8.93 m) the span of a Fokker D.VII: images suggest the whole of the Fokker wing was used
- Airfoil: thick and related to those developed in Göttingen by Prandtl
- Gross weight: 500 lb (227 kg) approximately
