= Ginn-Lesniak Kestrel =

British two-seat glider, 1969

Kestrel

General information
- Type: Two seat semi-aerobatic sailplane
- National origin: United Kingdom
- Designer: Vic Ginn and Lesniak
- Number built: 1

History
- First flight: 19 July 1969

The Ginn-Lesniak Kestrel is a one-off homebuilt two seat sailplane, designed in the United Kingdom in the 1950s and flown in 1969.

== Design and development ==
Though the sole Kestrel did not fly until 1969, its design and construction began in 1956. Vic Ginn and Lesniak, both members of the London Gliding Club (LGC) designed it and Ginn built the wings, tailplane and front fuselage at his Luton home. The rear fuselage was built at the LGC at Dunstable Downs where, after some years delay, the aircraft was finally assembled by Jeff Butt and Ron Dodd. It was described as a semi-aerobatic aircraft and was built of wood and fabric.

The most unusual feature of the Kestrel is that its straight tapered, cantilever wings have a forward sweep of about 8°. The wings carry outboard ailerons and airbrakes, the latter at about one third span and chord. There are no flaps. The straight tapered tailplane and elevators, mounted on the upper fuselage, are set forward of the rudder hinge. The fin and rudder are straight edged and of about equal area, the latter extending to the bottom of the fuselage.

The fuselage has an oval cross section, increasing in depth forwards to behind the cockpit where the wing is mounted. Both seats, placed in tandem, are forward of the wing root under a canopy. A skid from nose to a monowheel below the wing root leading edge forms the undercarriage, assisted by a small tail bumper.

The Kestrel first flew at the LGC on Dunstable Downs on 19 July 1969.

== Operational history ==
By 1998 the Kestrel, refurbished, was with the Lakes Gliding Club. By 2010 it had moved to storage with the Anglia Gliding Club at RAF Wattisham.

== Specifications ==
Data from Ellison

General characteristics

- Capacity: 2
- Length: 24 ft 9 in (7.54 m)
- Wingspan: 59 ft 1 in (18.0 m)
- Wing area: 243 sq ft (22.6 m^{2})
- Aspect ratio: 14.3
- Airfoil: Gōttingen 549 at roo, M 12 at tip
- Empty weight: 678 lb (308 kg)
- Gross weight: 1,100 lb (499 kg)

Performance

- Maximum speed: 138 mph (222 km/h, 120 kn)
- Stall speed: 37 mph (60 km/h, 32 kn)
- Rate of sink: 132 ft/min (0.67 m/s) minimum at 50 mph (80 km/h)
- Lift-to-drag: Maximum 28
