= Hick Merlin =

British single-seat glider, 1936

Merlin

General information
- Type: High performance sailplane
- National origin: United Kingdom
- Designer: W. E. Hick
- Number built: 1

History
- First flight: 2 February 1936

The Hick Merlin was a high performance small sailplane built in the United Kingdom in the mid-1930s. It was a wooden, single seat, parasol wing aircraft. Only one was built.

== Design and development ==
The Merlin, originally known as the Kestrel, was designed and built by W. E. Hick of the Newcastle Glider Club. It took three years to complete, first flying on 2 February 1936 from the Club's Moat Law site.

It was a wooden single seat high performance glider with a parasol wing of three parts. The long outer panels were continuously tapered and the centre section had an uncovered strip above the fuselage, with the open cockpit not far below the underside of the wing. The wing was braced by a single lift strut on either side from the bottom of the fuselage to the outer centre section, assisted by flying wires. The ailerons reached to the wing tips where the whole wing surface rotated, the leading edge acting as an aerodynamic balance; there were no flaps or airbrakes.

The fuselage was rounded and tapered towards the rear. The tail surfaces had straight leading edges and curved trailing edges; the rudder was described as "automatic". The Merlin landed on a simple central skid which ran along the fuselage underside from the nose to below the wing trailing edge, assisted by a tailskid.

== Operational history ==
Apart from the first flight, the activities of the Merlin seem not to have been recorded. It was tailored around its owner and seems not to have suited other pilots, ending up on the club bonfire.

== Specifications ==
Data from Ellison

General characteristics

- Crew: 1
- Length: 14 ft 9 in (4.50 m)
- Wingspan: 34 ft 4 in (10.46 m)
- Wing area: 80.0 sq ft (7.43 m^{2})
- Aspect ratio: 14.8
- Airfoil: Gõttingen 652
- Empty weight: 90 lb (41 kg)
- Gross weight: 256 lb (116 kg)

Performance

- Rate of sink: 120 ft/min (0.61 m/s) minimum
- Lift-to-drag: 20
