= Radlock Trainer =

British single-seat glider, 1932

General information
- Type: Single seat primary glider
- National origin: UK
- Manufacturer: members of the Hull Experimental Gliding Club
- Designer: J. E. Raddings and W. E. Locke
- Number built: 1

History
- First flight: 1932

The Radlock Trainer was a single seat primary glider designed and built by members of the Hull Experimental Gliding Club as a basic trainer for their own use in the early 1930s. It was a simple, single exposed seat, wooden glider with a parasol wing.

== Design and development ==
In 1931 two members of the Hedon-based Hull Experimental Gliding Club designed a single-seat primary glider, known as the Radlock glider from a conjunction of their names, Raddings and Locke. The designers worked for Blackburn Aeroplane and Motor Co., Ltd., based at Brough near Hull. The club had a workshop at Hessle and the glider was built there by members during 1931–1932.

The Radlock glider had a wing of rectangular plan built around two spars. It carried ailerons but no flaps or airbrakes. The wing was attached high above the fuselage by a pair of lift struts, one from the upper fuselage to the forward spar and the other reaching forwards from the lower fuselage member, behind the wing trailing edge, to the aft spar. Both lift struts joined the wing at about mid-span. The centre section was braced with a single N-form set of struts and these also provided a base for a triangular kingpost above the wing, from which a pair of landing wires on each side ran to the spars at mid-span.

The fuselage was simple, very narrow and shallow, being formed from two members, one above the other and joined by short X-shaped webs. The pilot sat below the leading edge of the wing, his seat and controls on a short platform attached to the upper fuselage member. There was a short, square fin with the triangular tailplane on top of it. The rudder was almost twice the height of the fin and reached down to the lower fuselage, moving in a cut-out between the elevators. The rear of the fuselage was laterally braced by a pair of wires from the rear spar at the tops of the lift strut to the rear end of the lower fuselage member.

Originally the Radlock landed on the skid-shaped lower fuselage member, though later a simple pair of wheels was added for auto-towed launches. A photograph taken before September 1932 may show the wheels in place before the tail covering was complete. There was a tail bumper.

== Operational history ==
The first flight was made in 1932. No BGA Certificate of Airworthiness number was recorded. The Radlock seems to have been in regular use with the Hull G.C. at Hedon in 1933, with auto-launches for free flights and auto-towing for training. It is not known how long it remained in service.

== Specifications ==
Data from British Gliders and Sailplanes 1922-1970

General characteristics

- Length: 17 ft 0 in (5.18 m)
- Wingspan: 38 ft 0 in (11.58 m)
- Wing area: 171 sq ft (15.9 m^{2})
- Aspect ratio: 8.45
- Empty weight: 182 lb (83 kg)
