= Reynard R.4 Primary =

British single-seat glider, 1930

R.4 Primary

General information
- Type: Primary glider
- National origin: United Kingdom
- Manufacturer: Reynard Gliders, Leicester
- Number built: at least 5

History
- First flight: 1930

The Reynard R.4 Primary was an open seat primary glider with an open girder fuselage and a high, wire braced wing. It was designed and built in the UK in 1930 and a few served Gliding Clubs in England and Ireland.

== Design and development ==
Like other primary gliders, the Reynard R.4 Primary was a simple, wooden, robust design, not intended for high performance.

The wing was rectangular in plan, with ailerons at the tips but no flaps or airbrakes. N-form struts from the wing supported a girder about 8.5 ft (2.6 m) long and curved on the underside to form a landing skid. The pilot's seat and controls were placed, exposed, on its upper surface just ahead of the wing. Lift wires ran from this girder to the underside of the wing beyond mid-span and a pair of landing wires on each side were fixed to the apex of a two strut, triangular central cabane or kingpost above the wing.

Behind the wing trailing edge and the end of the lower girder the rear fuselage was a tapering, vertically orientated, two bay Warren truss, ending at a vertical cross member which supported the rudder. The triangular tailplane and fin were mounted on the horizontal upper fuselage beam and the straight edged rudder extended down through a cut-out between the elevators to the lower beam.

Some Reynards were built with a hinged nacelle to give the pilot better protection from the weather, though still in an open cockpit. To compensate for the extra side area the rear two bays of the fuselage were fabric covered.

It has been suggested that at least two R.4s were built with steel tubed rather than wooden rear fuselages, under the name Reynolds R.4 after the contemporary bicycle tube frame manufacturer.

== Operational history ==
The Reynard could be bought complete for £45 or built from plans costing 21/- (1 guinea or £1.05) and was regularly advertised in 1930-1. Several were built and active in the early 1930s with UK gliding clubs. One was demonstrated to the Leeds club in October 1930 and they received the first of two the following month. The Bradford, Halifax, Leicester and Ulster Gliding Clubs also had Reynards. The two Reynards that received BGA certificates of airworthiness, BGA 166 and 167 had serial number R.4/5 and R.4/6 respectively BGA 166 was used by the Leeds and later Bradford Gliding Clubs. BGA 167 was used by the Ulster Gliding Club from 1931, they fitted a nacelle when they rebuilt it aircraft in 1933. This glider went to the Dublin Gliding Club in 1934 and was still active the following year.

== Specifications ==
Data from British Gliders and Sailplanes 1920-1972

General characteristics

- Crew: 1
- Length: 18 ft 3 in (5.56 m)
- Wingspan: 34 ft 2 in (10.41 m)
- Height: 7 ft 2 in (2.18 m)
- Aspect ratio: 6.6
