= Merriam glider =

General information
- Type: single seat glider
- National origin: United Kingdom
- Designer: F. W. Merriam
- Number built: 1

History
- First flight: 1922

The Merriam glider was a single-seat monoplane glider, designed specifically for the first British gliding competition held at Itford Hill in 1922, an endurance event. It crashed at the start of its first competitive flight and was later converted into a dual control training glider.

== Design ==
In August 1922, the Daily Mail newspaper offered a £1,000 prize for the longest duration flight by an unpowered, heavier than air aircraft. The competition was to be organized by the Royal Aero Club, who chose the site (Itford Hill, on the Sussex South Downs near Lewes) and the date (16–21 October). This gave competitors six weeks to design, build and transport their entries. Thirteen machines arrived in time and one of these was the Merriam glider, competition number 18.

The Merriam glider was designed, built and flown by Frederick Warren Merriam. He built it in one of the sheds belonging to S. E. Saunders at Cowes, Isle of Wight where Newman was works manager. The latter took a close interest in the glider and came to Itford with it; it is sometimes referred to as the Merriam-Newman glider.

It was an all-wood aircraft, a parasol wing monoplane. Though several of the Itford contenders used thick airfoils, the Merriam used the thin R.A.F. 15 section and its wing required external wire bracing. A pair of flying wires on each side ran from a central, four strut pylon above the wing central section and three more pairs ran from the lower fuselage longerons to the wing undersides. The wing had constant chord and blunt wing tips, with ailerons which reached the tips and extended aft a little beyond the wing trailing edge.

The glider had a deep, rectangular cross-section fuselage, straight edged and roughly rhomboidal in profile. The underside sloped up rearwards, with an all-moving tailplane hinged at its extremity. Fin and rudder had a cropped parallelogram form, sloping up to allow clearance between rudder and elevator. The single open cockpit was ahead of the wing. Twin wheels were attached outside the fuselage, assisted by a tailskid.

== Operational history ==
Merriam and Newman arrived at Itford late on Saturday 14 October, the first of two pre-competition practice days. A competitive flight on the Monday was called off when the wind dropped. It was launched the following day and crashed immediately. Though Merriam was only slightly hurt, his glider was too damaged to continue.

After repair the Merriam went to the Whitely Bank School of gliding, set up by Merriam on the Isle of Wight where it was converted into a dual control two seater. In 1930 it was with the Isle of Wight Gliding Club, but there is no evidence that it was flown by this club.

== Specifications ==
Data from British Gliders and Sailplanes

General characteristics

- Capacity: 1
- Length: 19 ft 6 in (5.94 m)
- Wingspan: 38 ft 4 in (11.68 m)
- Wing area: 225.0 sq ft (20.90 m^{2})
- Aspect ratio: 6.54
- Airfoil: R.A.F. 15
- Empty weight: 200 lb (91 kg)
- Gross weight: 360 lb (163 kg)
- Wing loading: 1.60 lb/sq ft (7.81 kg/m^{2})
