= Davis-Costin Condor =

British two-seat glider, 1953

Condor

General information
- Type: Two seat sailplane
- National origin: United Kingdom
- Designer: Peter Davis and Frank Costin
- Number built: 1

History
- First flight: 1953
- Retired: 1961

The Davis-Costin Condor was a conventional all-wood, tandem-seat sailplane built in the United Kingdom in the 1950s. Only one was constructed; it was later rebuilt with a longer fuselage and other detailed alterations as the Condor 2.

== Design and development ==
The Condor was an all-wood glider, seating two in tandem. The wing was built around two spars and the planform was unusual in that the chord of the straight tapered inboard section increased outwards. The outer wing sections, where the ailerons were mounted, were conventionally tapered. No flaps or airbrakes were fitted. The wings joined a raised fuselage centre section and were braced by pairs of parallel lift struts from about one third span to the bottom of the fuselage.

Its fuselage was flat sided with angled panels above and below. The straight edged tailplane and elevators were set well forward on top of the fuselage. There was no fixed fin, just a generous and slightly angular rudder. The front seat was just ahead of the wing leading edge and the rear one near mid-chord. A skid from the nose ended under the wing with a small monowheel; a little tailwheel was fixed below the rudder hinge.

The first flight was made in 1953. No Certificate of Airworthiness was issued. Later, P. Davis rebuilt the aircraft with several alterations. The fuselage was lengthened by 8 in (203 mm), chiefly by moving the cockpit further forward, at the cost of a 7 lb (3.2 kg) increase in weight. The trailing edge of the rudder was curved outwards and a very small dorsal fillet added. Minor undercarriage changes were also made. Named Condor 2, the rebuilt aircraft first flew on 13 August 1960. It was written off less than a year later on 25 June 1961 when it crashed at Chesford Head, near Winchester in Hampshire.

== Specifications ==
Data from Ellison

General characteristics

- Crew: 2
- Length: 23 ft 9 in (7.24 m)
- Wingspan: 44 ft 6 in (13.56 m)
- Wing area: 150 sq ft (14 m^{2})
- Aspect ratio: 10.4
- Airfoil: Gōttingen 426 modified at root, NACA64-110 at tip
- Empty weight: 418 lb (190 kg)

Performance

- Rate of sink: 150 ft/min (0.76 m/s) minimum at 34 mph (55 km/h)
- Lift-to-drag: Maximum 22 at 40 mph, (65 km/h)
