= Nyborg T.G.N.1 =

British single-seat glider, 1932

T.G.N. 1

General information
- Type: sailplane
- Manufacturer: UK
- Designer: T. G. Nyborg
- Number built: 1 or 3

History
- First flight: Between May and August 1932
- Retired: 1950s

The Nyborg T.G.N.1 was a single-seat experimental sailplane built in the early 1930s, its unusual wing design a scaled-up version of the wings of large birds.

== Design and development ==
The design of the Nyborg glider was strongly informed by the Danish engineer T G Nyborg's long and quantitative study of bird flight. These considerations led to a glider with wings of high aspect ratio and high wing loading. The T.G.N.1 had an aspect ratio of 21.8 and wing loading of 8.0 lb/ft^{2} (39 kg/m^{2}), compared with 9.9 and 2.8 lb/ft^{2} (13.7 kg/m^{2}) for the roughly contemporary Slingsby Falcon (Schleicher Falke).

The short-span, narrow mean chord (16 in or 406 mm) cantilever wing was built of wood like the rest of the T.G.N.1. It had three parts, two plywood-skinned lifting sections each 15 ft (4.57 m) long joined by a 3 ft (910 mm) centre section. The single wing spar was a 4×3 in (102×76 mm) spruce beam. The wing was straight edged and tapered by sweep on the leading edge only. The trailing edges carried full-span ailerons with the inboard half-spans divided into three sections. These inner surfaces moved through progressively smaller angles than the outer ones and could be lowered as camber changing flaps or airbrakes.

This wing was shoulder mounted to a short, stout, flat-sided fuselage. The enclosed cockpit was over the wing with a prominent, curved fairing behind the pilot's head. The tailplane, shaped like a bird's tail, had unusually broad chord for the period, with strong sweep on its leading edge. Its trailing edge was placed at the end of the fuselage and carried a single-piece elevator. Several different rudder shapes were tried or considered: drawings of the early version show a triangular surface with a straight and vertical trailing edge apart from a small cut-out for elevator movement, but pre-first flight images show it with a cropped, triangular fin and tall, rectangular rudder, temporarily installed for aero-towing. By 1938 both fin and rudder appear rectangular, with the latter taller.

Some sources refer to the T.G.N. III and the number built is not certain; either one aircraft was progressively modified, including the fin and rudder alterations noted above, or three different aircraft were built. In an account of an attempt to fly the Nyborg in about 1948, the author reports he "saw the wings of the next model under construction. It looked as though the same fuselage, or much the same fuselage, had been used on most of his gliders, the only change being to the wings." He also noted that the wings were built professionally. An accompanying, undated photograph shows the glider with a further modified, rounded rudder.

== Operational history ==
Towed trials were begun in the late Spring of 1932 but encountered lateral instability problems. An increase in rudder area was not the answer but it seems a cure was found, perhaps by completing the cockpit enclosure, as a particular flight was noted on 13 August 1932. The early tests were made from the London Gliding Club's Totternhoe field on Dunstable Downs. By 1938 it was flying at Duxford.

Its final flights were made near Worcester, Nyborg's home town, in the late 1950s. Despite the long flying life of the T.G.N., no careful assessment of its performance seems to have been made to decide between the predictions made by the designer, his contemporary critics and later analysis.

The Nyborg T.G.N.III survived in store at Warwick in the early 1990s, number 25 on the British Aviation Preservation Council register.

== Specifications ==
Data from British Gliders and Sailplanes 1922-1970

General characteristics

- Capacity: 1
- Length: 12 ft 6 in (3.81 m)
- Wingspan: 33 ft 0 in (10.06 m)
- Wing area: 50 sq ft (4.6 m^{2})
- Aspect ratio: 21.8
- Airfoil: Nyborg
- Gross weight: 450 lb (204 kg) (another source gives 370 lb (168 kg)).
- Wing loading: 8.0 lb/sq ft (39 kg/m^{2}) (a letter from Nyborg says 8.6 lb/ft^{2} (42 kg/m^{3})).
