= Holmes KH-1 =

British single-seat glider, 1971

KH-1

General information
- Type: Single-seat high-performance homebuilt sailplane
- National origin: United Kingdom
- Designer: Kenneth Holmes
- Number built: 1

History
- First flight: 27 November 1971

The Holmes KH-1 is a British single-seat high-performance homebuilt sailplane designed and built by Kenneth Holmes and first flown on 27 November 1971.

== Design ==
The KH-1 is a shoulder-wing cantilever monoplane with a conventional all-wood semi-monocoque fuselage and tail unit with an all-moving tailplane, the wings have small-span flaps for control during approach but no airbrakes or spoilers. The pilot has a semi-reclined seat in an enclosed cockpit under a two-piece transparent canopy. The KH-1 landing gear is a retractable monowheel gear and a tailskid, it is also fitted with a tail drag chute to control speed during approach.

== Specifications ==
Data from Jane's All the World's Aircraft 1973-74

General characteristics

- Crew: 1
- Length: 7.315 m (24 ft 0 in)
- Wingspan: 18.56 m (61 ft 0 in)
- Wing area: 11.70 m^{2} (126 sq ft)
- Empty weight: 226 kg (500 lb)
- Gross weight: 325 kg (716 lb)

Performance

- Maximum speed: 158 km/h (97.5 mph, 84.7 kn)
- Stall speed: 67 km/h (41.5 mph, 36.1 kn)
