= Luton Minor =

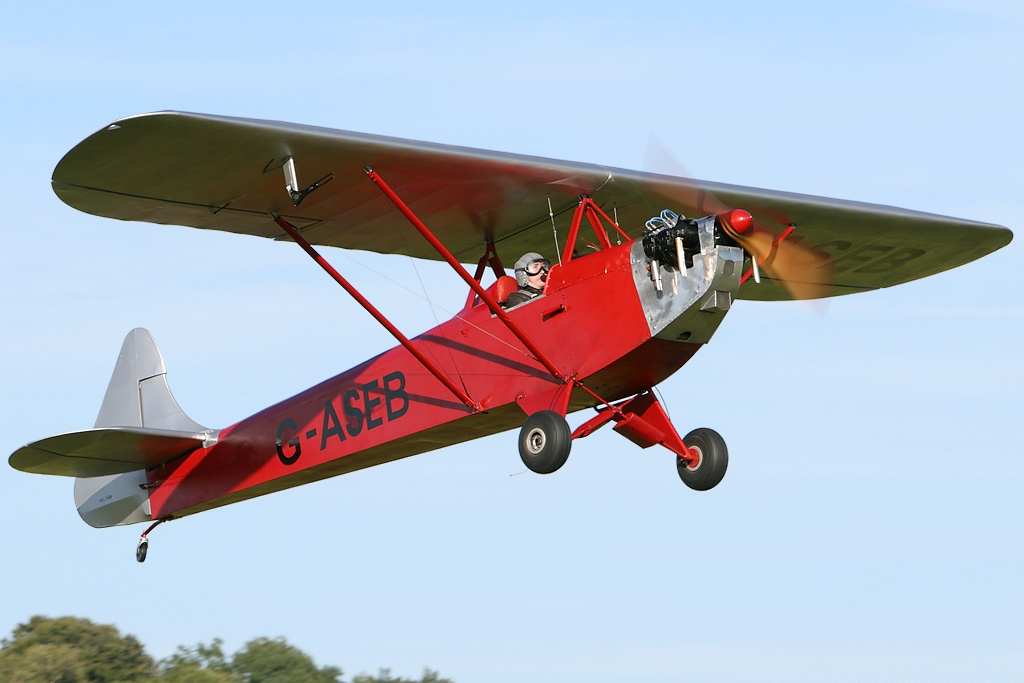

General information
- Type: Ultralight
- Manufacturer: Light Aircraft Association
- Designer: C.H. Latimer-Needham

History
- Manufactured: 30
- First flight: 3 March 1937

The Luton L.A.4 Minor was a 1930s British single-seat high-wing ultra-light aircraft. The prototype was built by the Luton Aircraft Limited, and design plans were later adapted and copies sold for homebuilding.

== Design and development ==
The L.A.3 Minor ultralight was powered by a 35 hp Anzani inverted-vee air-cooled engine, and was of spruce, ply and fabric construction. It was designed by C.H. Latimer-Needham, and built by Luton Aircraft at Barton-in-the-Clay, Bedfordshire in 1936, using the fuselage and components of the earlier experimental L.A.2 tandem-wing aircraft. The prototype L.A.3 Minor, registered G-AEPD, first flew on 3 March 1937 at Heston Aerodrome. The aircraft was a successful flyer despite the low-powered engine, and it was then redesigned for home construction. Designated the L.A.4 Minor, it had a strutted undercarriage and parallel wing struts. The first L.A.4 Minor was built at the company's new factory (the Phoenix Works) at Gerrards Cross in Buckinghamshire. It was fitted with a 40 hp ABC Scorpion two-cylinder horizontally opposed engine. All subsequent Luton Minors were home-built from plans sold by the company.

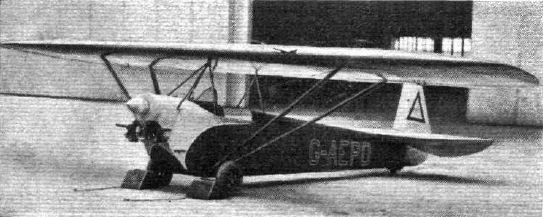
Luton Minor (G-AEPD) at Heston Aerodrome, 1937

The Phoenix Works had burnt down during 1943, and Luton Aircraft had closed, so designer C.H. Latimer-Needham and A.W.J.G. Ord-Hume created a new company in March 1958 to take over the design rights for the Luton Minor. Latimer-Needham updated the design to take more modern lightweight four-cylinder engines and an increased all-up weight. The redesigned aircraft was designated L.A.4A Minor. The design, and subsequently the aircraft, has been built all over the world as a homebuilt aircraft with a wide variety of engines, with the plans for the aircraft being passed on to the Popular Flying Association (now the Light Aircraft Association) in the UK.

== Operational history ==
Reviewers Roy Beisswenger and Marino Boric described the design in a 2015 review, saying, "it has a great deal of period charm and gives a back-to-basics feel, although performance doesn't match more modern designs. Predictable handling and sturdy construction make it a joy to own. A white scarf is a compulsory accessory.".

== Variants ==
L.A.3 Minor
Prototype ultralight, one built.
L.A.4 Minor
Homebuilt version, one factory built and numerous homebuilt examples.
L.A.4A Minor
Updated homebuilt version to take more modern engines, all homebuilt.
Knowles Duet
The Knowles Duet was a side-by-side two seat version built by Alf Knowles in 1971, registered G-AYTT.
Coates Swalesong S.A.I
A Luton Minor built by James Coates, registered as G-AMAW.

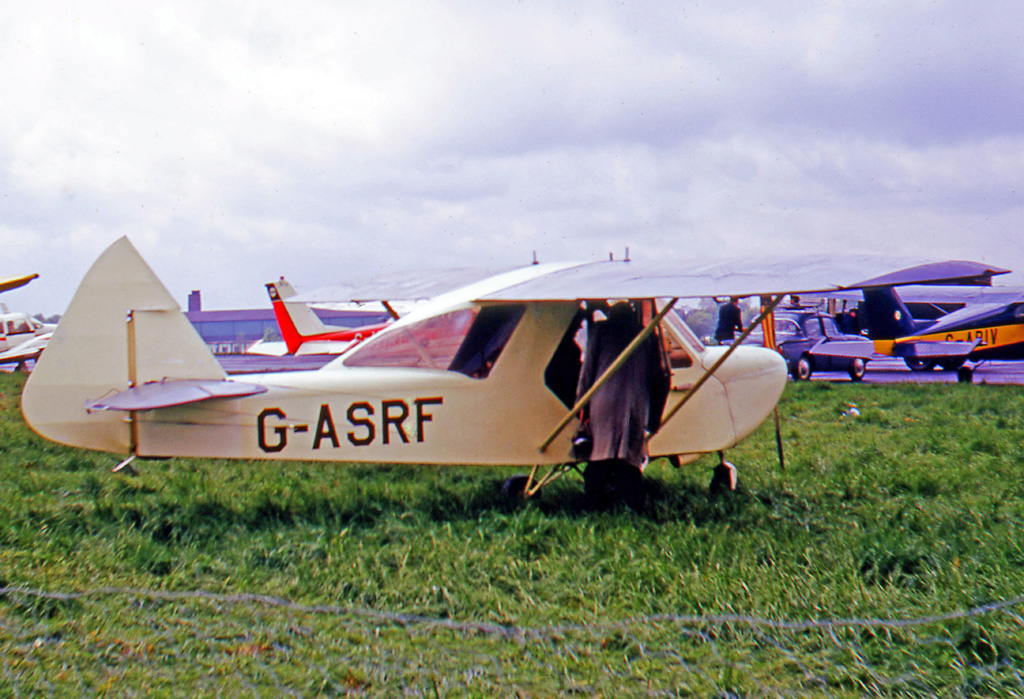
The Gowland Jenny Wren at Biggin Hill airfield in 1969

Gowland Jenny Wren
A Luton Minor with enclosed cockpit and tricycle landing gear; registered G-ASRF it first flew on 13 OCtober 1966 at Panshanger.

== Specifications (L.A.4A) ==
Data from British Civil Aircraft 1919–1972: Volume III, Jane's All the World's Aircraft 1958-59

General characteristics

- Crew: 1
- Length: 20 ft 9 in (6.32 m)
- Wingspan: 25 ft 0 in (7.62 m)
- Height: 6 ft 3 in (1.91 m)
- Wing area: 125 sq ft (11.6 m^{2})
- Aspect ratio: 5
- Airfoil: RAF 48
- Empty weight: 390 lb (177 kg)
- Gross weight: 627 lb (284 kg)
- Max takeoff weight: 750 lb (340 kg)
- Fuel capacity: 6.5 imp gal (7.8 US gal; 30 L) with provision for auxiliary tanks in the wings
- Powerplant: 1 × Aeronca-J.A.P. J-99 air-cooled horizontally-opposed piston engine, 37 hp (28 kW)

Alternative engines up to 65 hp (48 kW) can be fitted

- Propellers: 2-bladed fixed-pitch propeller

Performance

- Maximum speed: 85 mph (137 km/h, 74 kn)
- Cruise speed: 75 mph (121 km/h, 65 kn)
- Stall speed: 28 mph (45 km/h, 24 kn)
- Range: 180 mi (290 km, 160 nmi)
- Ferry range: 400 mi (640 km, 350 nmi) with auxiliary wing fuel tanks
- Rate of climb: 450 ft/min (2.3 m/s)
- Wing loading: 5 lb/sq ft (24 kg/m^{2})
- Power/mass: 0.0588 hp/lb (0.0967 kW/kg)
- Take-off run: 240 ft (73 m)
- Landing run: 120 ft (37 m)
