= Stedman TS-1 City of Leeds =

British two-seat glider, 1939

TS-1 City of Leeds

General information
- Type: Two seat sailplane
- National origin: United Kingdom
- Designer: R. F. Stedman
- Number built: 1

History
- First flight: 21 July 1934
- Retired: 1939

The Stedman TS-1 City of Leeds was a parasol wing wooden sailplane, seating two in tandem open cockpits. Only one was built, by its designer in 1934; it remained active until the outbreak of World War II.

== Design and development ==
The City of Leeds was designed and built by R. F. Stedman, a member of the Bradford and County Gliding Club at the time, between 1932 and 1934. It flew for the first time on 21 July 1934 from Baildon in West Yorkshire. It was a simple wooden aircraft featuring open cockpits and wings with a modest aspect ratio, not designed for high performance. Its wing was built around two spars and had constant chord apart from slight leading edge taper near the tip. There were no airbrakes or flaps. The wing was mounted parasol fashion on pairs of parallel, broad chord lift struts which joined the spars at about mid-span to the lower fuselage longerons.

The fuselage was flat sided and hexagonal in cross section. The cockpits were in tandem, one at the wing leading edge and the other under the wing at mid-chord. A single landing skid ran from the nose to below the wing trailing edge. The fuselage tapered slightly rearwards, where a straight edged tailplane was mounted on its upper surface. The fin was small, carrying a taller, balanced, wide chord and curved rudder which reached down to the bottom of the fuselage, moving in a cut-out between the elevators.

== Operational history ==
Plans of the TS-1 were advertised at £8-8-0 (£8.40), but only the prototype was built. This obtained its Certificate of Airworthiness BGA 213 in April 1935 after some modification and strengthening. It flew in the 1935 National Gliding Championships at Sutton Bank and remained active until a ban on private civil aviation was imposed at the start of World War II, when its designer and builder became a local chief test pilot at Blackburn Aircraft's Sherburn-in-Elmet plant. Stedman was the first, if not the only, British glider pilot to escape by parachute, bailing out of a military glider in 1944. What happened to his own glider is not known.

== Specifications ==
Data from British Gliders and Sailplanes 1922-1970

General characteristics

- Crew: 2
- Length: 25 ft 0 in (7.62 m)
- Wingspan: 50 ft 0 in (15.24 m)
- Wing area: 295 sq ft (27.4 m^{2})
- Aspect ratio: 8.3
- Airfoil: Modified Göttingen 535
- Empty weight: 424 lb (192 kg)
- Gross weight: 725 lb (329 kg)

Performance

- Cruise speed: 30 mph (48 km/h, 26 kn)
- Stall speed: 24 mph (39 km/h, 21 kn)
- Wing loading: 2.46 lb/sq ft (12.0 kg/m^{2})
