= Latimer-Needham Albatross =

British single-seat glider, 1930

Albatross

General information
- Type: single-seat sailplane
- National origin: United Kingdom
- Manufacturer: RFD Co., Guildford
- Designer: C.H. Latimer-Needham
- Number built: 1

History
- First flight: 1930

The Latimer-Needham Albatross was the first British-designed and constructed sailplane, flying in 1930. Only one example of this single-seat, wooden aircraft was built.

== Design and development ==
The RFD Company constructed the Albatross to C.H. Latimer-Needham's design, the first British-designed and built sailplane. It was a conventional wooden single-seat aircraft, its cantilever high wing having a constant chord centre section and outboard straight-tapered panels from about mid-span. Ailerons were fitted from the wing tips over most of the outboard sections but here were no flaps or air brakes. The wing was mounted with slight dihedral on top of the fuselage, which was rectangular in cross section and tapered only a little towards the tail. There were no fixed rear surfaces, both elevators and rudder being all moving. The elevator, mounted on top of the fuselage, had constant chord apart from a cut-out for rudder movement; the latter was tall, with a vertical leading edge and curved trailing edge.

The Albatross's single-seat open cockpit was at the leading edge of the wing, with a fairing behind the pilot's head reaching aft beyond the trailing edge. Originally it landed on a skid which was part of a V-shaped ventral extension of the fuselage, running from just behind the nose about half the length of the aircraft. Twin landing wheels were fitted later.

== Operational history ==
Only one Albatross was built, receiving its Certificate of Airworthiness in October 1930. It appeared at the Glider Show held at The Royal Agricultural Hall, Islington in May 1931. It was later sold to Edwin S Griffis, who was killed when the wing failed when it was being launched at the Furness Gliding Club site at Ireleth on 12 August 1936.

== Specifications ==
Data from Ellison

General characteristics

- Length: 20 ft 8 in (6.3 m)
- Wingspan: 42 ft 0 in (12.8 m)
- Wing area: 180 sq ft (17 m^{2})
- Aspect ratio: 10
- Airfoil: Göttingen 535
- Empty weight: 205 lb (93 kg)
- Gross weight: 360 lb (163 kg)
