= Peak 100 =

British two-seat glider, 1963

General information
- Type: Two seat high performance training and competition sailplane
- National origin: UK
- Manufacturer: Peak Sailplanes Ltd., Chapel-en-le-Frith
- Designer: Harry Midwood
- Number built: 1

History
- First flight: 5 February 1963

The Peak 100 was a side-by-side two-seat high performance sailplane, featuring a steel-framed fuselage, designed in the United Kingdom in the early 1960s. Only one was built.

== Design and development ==
The Peak 100 was designed by Harry Midwood of the Bedford Sailplane Design Group and the only prototype was built by Peak Sailplanes at Chapel-en-le-Frith in Derbyshire. Seating two side-by-side, it was intended to be suitable for training at elementary and advanced levels and to have a performance high enough for competitions.

The Peak 100 had a cantilever, shoulder-mounted, long-span wing of thick section and straight tapered plan, constructed in three parts with a 28 ft (8.53 m) centre section and a pair of 16 ft (4.88 m) outer panels. It was built around two spruce spars with birch plywood webs and had stressed birch ply skin back to the rear spar, with fabric covering behind. The outer panels carried fabric-covered, long span, aerodynamically balanced ailerons and a pair of DFS-type spoilers which extended above and below the wing were mounted on the centre section rear spar.

The fuselage of the Peak 100 had a welded steel tube structure, fabric covered apart from glass fibre nose and centre section fairings. Details of the steel structure were designed by Aviation and Engineering Projects Ltd and the wide, forward-sliding, one-piece canopy was made by English Electric. The original nose was very blunt and rounded; the flat-sided fuselage tapered towards the tail. An all-moving tailpane was mounted at the base of the fin. The tailplane was straight tapered, mostly on its trailing edge; it had a wooden structure, with a ply-covered leading edge and fabric elsewhere. It was fitted with anti-balance and trim tabs. The fin and horn-balanced rudder were also straight edged apart from a slightly rounded rudder top; the rudder was short, ending above the tailplane. Fin and rudder both had wooden structures, the former ply skinned and the latter mostly fabric covered.

The Peak 100's undercarriage was a little unusual in having two wheels in tandem rather than the more common monowheel plus skid arrangement. It was claimed this made ground handling under heavy conditions easier. There was also a small tailskid.

The first flight had been expected in 1962 but was delayed until 5 February 1963, piloted by Harry Midwood. This took place from Cranfield, Bedfordshire. Bad weather prevented much flying and so the aircraft went back to Peak Sailplanes for a lengthening and lowering of the nose, giving it a slightly more pointed look. Serious testing resumed at Long Mynd that Easter and was ongoing in August. It received its BGA certificate of airworthiness no. BGA 1140.

== Operational history ==
Early in its testing programme the Peak 100 made its first competitive appearance at the 1963 National Gliding Championships at Lasham. Two-seaters were not expected to perform as well as the more numerous single-seaters and both the Peak and the Slingsby Capstan finished well down the rankings.

Despite early plans for production at two separate factories, the prototype was the only Peak 100 built.

== Specifications ==
Data from British Gliders and Sailplanes 1922-1970

General characteristics

- Crew: one
- Capacity: one passenger
- Length: 27 ft 7 in (8.41 m)
- Wingspan: 60 ft 0 in (18.29 m)
- Aspect ratio: 15
- Gross weight: 1,250 lb (567 kg)

Performance

- Rate of sink: 140 ft/min (0.7 m/s) Minimum at 41 mph (67 km/h)
- Lift-to-drag: 29.5 at 46 mph (74 km/h) maximum
