= Halton Mayfly =

Mayfly
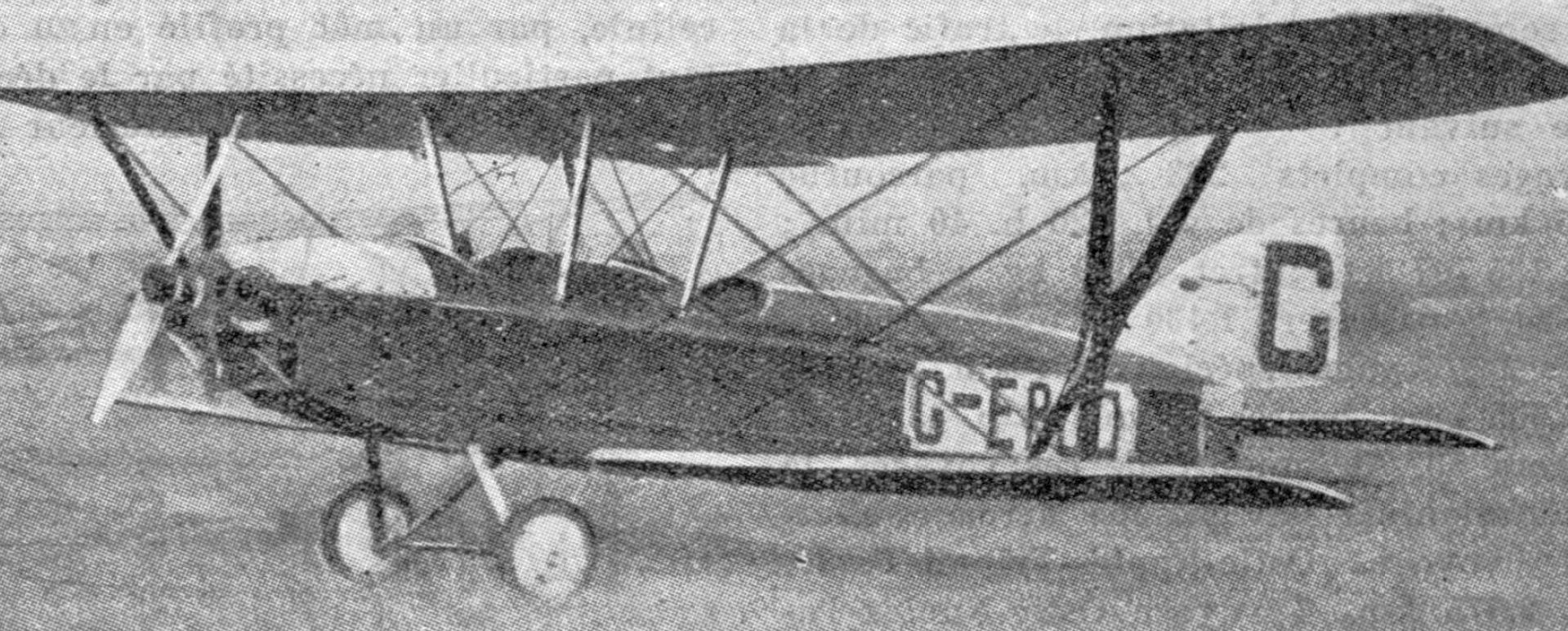

General information
- Type: Sports biplane
- National origin: United Kingdom
- Manufacturer: Halton Aero Club
- Designer: C.H. Latimer-Needham
- Number built: 1

History
- First flight: 31 January 1927

The Halton Mayfly was a British two-seat biplane designed by C.H. Latimer-Needham and built by the Halton Aero Club between 1926 and 1927. Registered G-EBOO and named the HAC.1 Mayfly it first flew on 31 January 1927. It was converted to a single-seater and was flown in a number of air races including the King's Cup Race. It was entered in the 1926 Lympne light aircraft trials as No. 8 but failed to arrive in time for the elimination trials.

By 1928 the aircraft had been converted from a biplane to a parasol monoplane and was renamed the Halton HAC.2 Minus. It was used again for air racing, being entered in the 1928 and 1928 King's Cup Races. The aircraft was dismantled at Halton in 1930.

== Variants ==
HAC.1 Mayfly
Two-seat then single-seat biplane powered by a Bristol Cherub III engine.
HAC.2 Minus
The Mayfly converted into a parasol monoplane.

== Specifications (Mayfly) ==
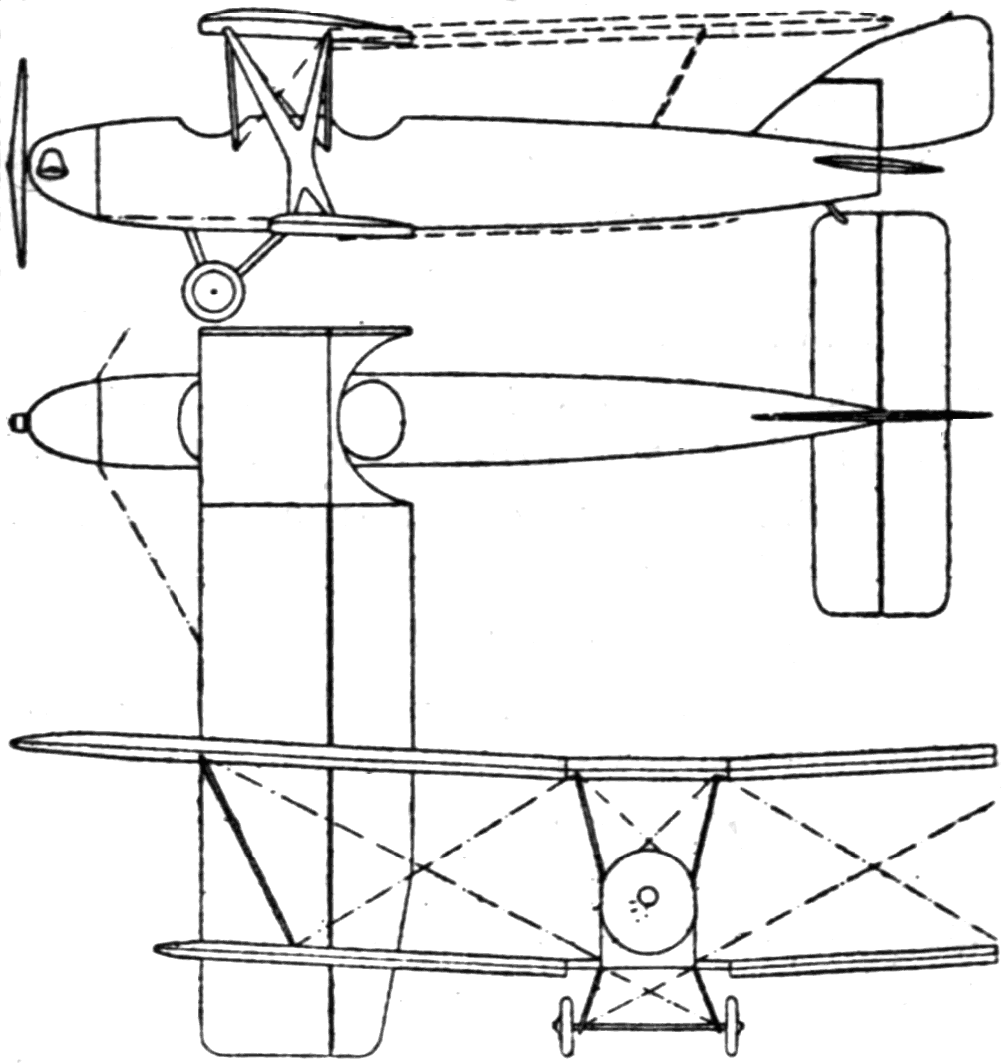
Halton HAC-1 Mayfly 3-view drawing from Le Document aéronautique October,1926

Data from

General characteristics

- Crew: one
- Length: 22 ft 0 in (6.71 m)
- Upper wingspan: 28 ft 6 in (8.69 m)
- Lower wingspan: 22 ft 0 in (6.71 m)
- Wing area: 195 sq ft (18.1 m^{2})
- Empty weight: 480 lb (218 kg)
- Gross weight: 920 lb (417 kg)
- Powerplant: 1 × Bristol Cherub III Two-cylinder, air-cooled piston engine, 32 hp (24 kW)

Performance

- Maximum speed: 83.5 mph (134.4 km/h, 72.6 kn)
- Cruise speed: 75 mph (121 km/h, 65 kn)
