= Broburn Wanderlust =

British single-seat glider, 1946

Wanderlust

General information
- Type: Single-seat glider
- National origin: United Kingdom
- Manufacturer: Broburn Sailplanes Ltd, Woodley
- Designer: T. E. Brown and K. W. Radburn
- Number built: 1

History
- First flight: 1946

The Broburn Wanderlust was a small, wooden, single-seat glider designed in the United Kingdom just after World War II. Only one was built, though it was well used.

== Design and development ==
The Wanderlust glider was designed and built by T. E. Brown and K. W. Radburn, two employees of Miles Aircraft, immediately after World War II. It was a single-seat, all-wood, shoulder-wing aircraft, with a short span for a glider of 34 ft (10 m) though with an aspect ratio of over 15.

The wing of the Wanderlust was built around a single spar, which with plywood skin around the leading edge formed a torsion box. Behind the spar the wing was fabric covered. There was 4° of dihedral and 2° of washout. The trailing edge was spanned with aerofoil section flaps, split into two equal sections. Inboard, these acted as simple flaps; outboard, additionally, as drooping ailerons. The two NACA airfoil sections used in the wing were chosen because they have centres of pressure that vary little with the angle of incidence, which increases when the flaps are deployed. The Wanderlust also had upper surface spoilers hinged on the wing spar at about quarter span.

The rest of the Wanderlust was plywood skinned, with a cockpit which could be open or enclosed in a bubble hood. The fuselage tapered aft, with the tailplane mounted on top and the small fin behind it. The elevators, with individual trim tabs, moved either side of the fin and the rudder was hinged behind their trailing edges. Both elevators and rudder were horn balanced. The Wanderlust landed on a pneumatically-mounted central skid.

== Operational history ==
Despite hopes of marketing the Wanderlust in finished and in kit form, only one was made. This was flown by many pilots including Lorne Welch. It was in at store at RAE Farnborough about 1970 and later donated to the Museum of Berkshire Aviation.

== Aircraft on display ==
- Museum of Berkshire Aviation - sole example

== Specifications ==
Data from Ellison

General characteristics

- Crew: 1
- Length: 18 ft 3 in (5.56 m)
- Wingspan: 34 ft 0 in (10.36 m)
- Height: 4 ft 0 in (1.22 m) tail down
- Wing area: 75.0 sq ft (6.97 m^{2})
- Aspect ratio: 15.4
- Airfoil: NACA 23021 at root, NACA 4312 at tip
- Empty weight: 250 lb (113 kg)
- Gross weight: 450 lb (204 kg)

Performance

- Cruise speed: 36 mph (58 km/h, 31 kn) optimum glde speed
- Stall speed: 32 mph (52 km/h, 28 kn)
- Maximum glide ratio: 1:25
- Rate of sink: 390 ft/min (1.98 m/s) minimum, at 95 mph (153 km/h)
- Wing loading: 4.5 lb/sq ft (22 kg/m^{2})
