= C.H. Latimer-Needham =

British aircraft designer, inventor and aviation author

Cecil Hugh (Chookie) Latimer-Needham (20 February 1900 – 5 May 1975) was a British aircraft designer, inventor and aviation author. He is best remembered for the series of aircraft he designed for the Luton Aircraft company and his invention of the Hovercraft skirt for which he was granted a patent. His book, Aircraft Design proved to be an invaluable reference work for Bill Goldfinch and Jack Best during their construction of the Colditz glider. The Germans were rather careless in providing a copy of the book in the Colditz prison library.

== Early life ==
Latimer-Needham was educated at University College London and served with the Royal Flying Corps (RFC) in France during 1918 and then with the Army of Occupation until 1919. He then transferred to the Royal Air Force (RAF) and became Educational Officer based at RAF Halton until 1935.

In the early 1920s he was involved in the design of the Halton Aero Club's Mayfly and Minus light aircraft.

== Designer ==
Interested in gliding, Latimer-Needham was an early pioneer of the sport in Britain. He was interested in the anatomy of birds and spent some time analysing the muscle-power, mass, wing-loading and structure of them. He once arranged for the bodies of dead birds to be sent to him from the zoo for examination. The result of these studies was the Albatross glider, one of which was built by RFD in Guildford, Surrey, in 1930. Founding the Dunstable Sailplane Company (DSC), he was appointed the first Chairman of the Technical Committee of the British Gliding Association and advised on the design of both powered and non-powered aircraft.

He left the RAF in 1935 and formed his second company, Luton Aircraft, at Barton-in-the-Clay, Bedfordshire, where he designed the Buzzard, Minor & Major. In 1936 the company moved to Gerrards Cross, while the DSC sold kits of parts for the Kestrel glider, which Latimer-Needham had also designed.

At the same time he became Senior Technical Officer to the Aeroplane and Armament Experimental Establishment (A&AEE) at Boscombe Down. On the outbreak of war, he became acting Chief Technical Officer to the Airborne Forces Experimental Establishment (AFEE). Following a period as Assistant Designer to the A. V. Roe Company (Avro) he became Chief Engineer to Flight Refuelling Ltd with Alan Cobham, flying on several early flight trials, including a 1947 non-stop flight from London to Bermuda. He was also consulted by the RFD company on the design of airborne life rafts.

== Phoenix Aircraft ==
With Arthur W. J. G. Ord-Hume he formed Phoenix Aircraft in 1958, working on the evolution of crop dusting equipment and methods, building a wind tunnel in which to test them, and a subsequent agricultural aircraft. At this time, the design of the hovercraft was at an early stage, and when Ord-Hume suggested a flexible skirt system to retain the air cushion beneath the craft, Latimer-Needham engineered a patentable design. Latimer-Needham then became a hovercraft consultant to the Saunders-Roe company.

== Death ==
In 1967 he left his home in Wonersh to emigrate to Canada, the home of his married daughters. After a visit to his home country in 1975, on return to Canada he suffered a serious heart attack from which he seemed to be recovering, however he died suddenly at his home in Kelowna, British Columbia on 5 May 1975.

== Aircraft Designs ==
=== Halton Aero Club 1924-1929 ===
- HAC1 Mayfly – 1 x 36 hp Bristol Cherub III
- HAC2 Minus – 1 x 36 hp Bristol Cherub III – based on Mayfly with lower wing removed
- HAC3 Meteor – racing tailless monoplane, powered by two 36 hp Bristol Cherub III (one in nose and one in rear). Although largely built by 1928 it was not completed
- HAC4 Major – 3 x 36 hp Bristol Cherub III – not completed

=== Luton Aircraft 1936-1939 ===
- Luton Buzzard I – 1 x 35 hp Anzani inverted Vee
- Luton L.A.2
- Luton L.A.3 Minor – 1 x 40 hp ABC Scorpion
- Luton L.A.4 Minor – 1 x 55 hp Lycoming O-145-A2
- Luton Buzzard II – 1 x 35 hp Anzani inverted Vee
- Luton L.A.5 Major – 1 x 62 hp Walter Mikron II

== Books ==
- Sailplanes, their design, construction and pilotage, Chapman and Hall Ltd, 1932
- Gliding And Soaring, Philip Allan, (The Sportsman's Library Vol. 10), 1935
- Aircraft Design, Vol.I: Aerodynamics, Chapman & Hall Ltd., 1939
- Aircraft Design, Vol.II: Aero Structures, 1939
- Refuelling in Flight, Pitman, 1950
- Man's Dilemma, Volturna Press, 1973
- Juggling with Jesus: and his two-thousand-year legacy to mankind, Exposition Press, 1977
