= Moore Gypsy =

British single-seat glider, 1970

Gypsy

General information
- Type: Single seat glider
- National origin: United Kingdom
- Manufacturer: The Birmingham Guild Ltd.
- Designer: L. P. Moore, J. Gibson and K. Emslie

History
- First flight: 7 April 1970

The Moore Gypsy or Birmingham Guild BG 100/12 and BG 135 is an early all-metal single-seat glider designed in the UK in the late 1960s. Several longer span variants were produced by various manufacturers. The first BG 135 was still flying in 2011.

== Design and development ==
The Moore Gypsy is a small glider, all metal apart from a GRP nose, designed by L. P. Moore, J. Gibson and K. Emslie and constructed by the Birmingham Guild Ltd. It has shoulder mounted, cost-saving wings of constant chord with square tips. Though the prototype had a 12 m span wing, longer span variants were envisaged from the outset.

The wings are light alloy structures with polyurethane foam cores and 0.0124 in (315 μm) light alloy skins. Ailerons and flaps occupy the whole of the trailing edge. The Gypsy has a constant chord V-tail constructed in the same manner as the wing. Its fuselage behind the nose is an oval section metal monocoque with a long, smooth, bulged canopy over the single seat cockpit that rejoins the fuselage profile. There is a single, semi-protruding fixed mono wheel under the wing and a small tailwheel.

The first Gypsy, the 12.0 m span BG 100/12, made its first flight from Pendeford airfield near Wolverhampton on 7 April 1970, piloted by Derek Piggott. A 13.46 m (44 ft 3.5 in) span version was first flown on 30 May 1971. Known as the BG 100/13.5, it was a rebuild of the sole BG 100/12; as well as the new wings, which were fitted with extended trailing edge air brakes, it had an increased span tailplane of higher aspect ratio.

The first pre-production Gypsy, the BG 135, flew in March 1972. It differed from the earlier versions chiefly in its wing construction, having the foam-stabilised thin skin of the BG 100s replaced by an aluminium alloy skinned D-box leading edge, based on the main spar, and with fabric covering between main and rear spars. The best glide angle of the BG 135 is 33:1. It gained a Certificate of Airworthiness in July 1972. After demonstrations at the British National Gliding Championships, held from 27 May to 4 June 1972, the BG 135 was loaned to several Clubs for evaluation. Following some minor modifications, production of a batch of seven was prepared.

This limited production by The Birmingham Guild was later taken over by Yorkshire Sailplanes as the YS 55 Consort.

In 1975, the design was further developed as the Swales SD3-15, with a 15 m (49 ft 2.5 in) span

== Operational history ==
At least one example has had an extended active life. The first BG 135, Certificate of Airworthiness BGA 1741, competed at the Inter-services Regional Glider Competition held at Hullavington Airfield in August 1998, 26 years after its first competitive appearance. BGA 1741 was recorded at RAF Keevil in 2009. In 2011 it was privately owned and based at Lasham Airfield.

== Variants ==
Moore Gypsy or (Birmingham Guild BG 100/12)
Original version, 12 m span, 1970.
BG 100/13.5
13.5 m span prototype, rebuilt BG 100/12, 1971.
BG 135
Production 13.5 m span version, 1972. 7 built by Yorkshire Sailplanes as the YS 55 Consort, plus one by Swales Sailplanes as the SW3-13.

== Specifications (Moore Gypsy/BG 100/12) ==
Data from Jane's All the World's Aircraft 1971

General characteristics

- Crew: 1
- Length: 19 ft 8 in (5.99 m)
- Wingspan: 39 ft 4 in (12.0 m)
- Height: 3 ft 11 in (1.19 m)
- Wing area: 90.0 sq ft (8.36 m^{2}) gross
- Aspect ratio: 17.15
- Airfoil: Wortmann FX61-168
- Empty weight: 275 lb (125 kg) ; 370 lb (168 kg) equipped
- Gross weight: 520 lb (236 kg)
- Max takeoff weight: 605 lb (274 kg)

Performance

- Stall speed: 43 mph (69 km/h, 37 kn) at maximum all up weight
- Maximum glide ratio: best 31: at 54-62 mph (87-100 km/h, 47-4 kn)
- Rate of sink: 138 ft/min (0.70 m/s) minimum at 47 mph (76 km/h, 41 kn)
- Wing loading: 6.7 lb/sq ft (33 kg/m^{2}) maximum
