= Barton-le-Clay =

Village in Bedfordshire, England

Coordinates: 51.9669°N 0.4241°W

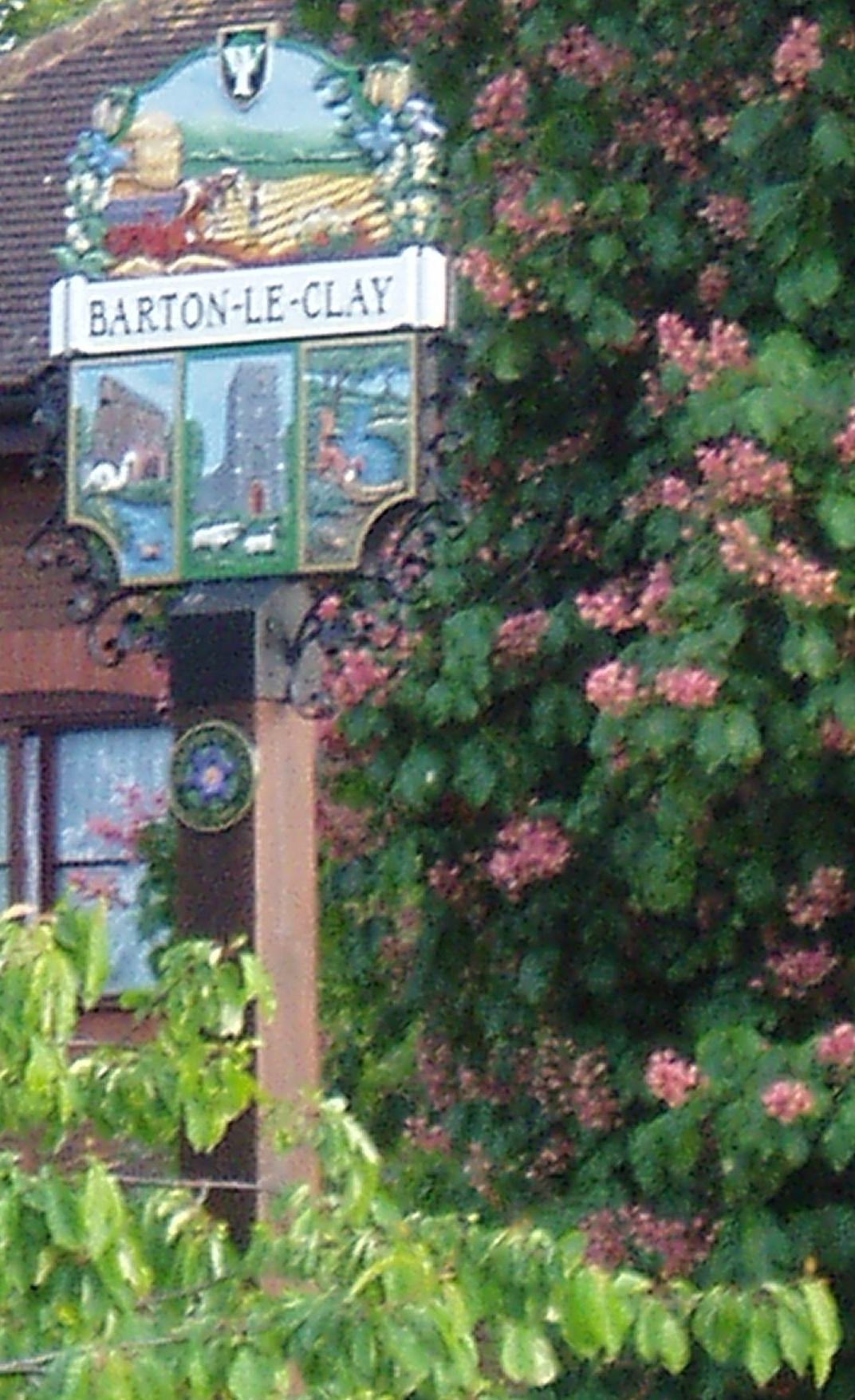
- The village sign Barton-le-Clay, Bedfordshire

- Location within Bedfordshire
- Population: 4,937 (parish)
- OS grid reference: TL082310
- Civil parish: Barton-le-Clay
- Unitary authority: Central Bedfordshire
- Ceremonial county: Bedfordshire
- Region: East
- Country: England
- Sovereign state: United Kingdom
- Post town: Bedford
- Postcode district: MK45
- Dialling code: 01582
- Police: Bedfordshire
- Fire: Bedfordshire
- Ambulance: East of England
- UK Parliament: Mid Bedfordshire

Barton-le-Clay is a large village and a civil parish in the Central Bedfordshire district of Bedfordshire, England, bordering Hertfordshire. In 2021 the parish had a population of 4,937. The village has existed since at least 1066 and is mentioned in the Domesday Book.

== History ==
On 25 May 1956 the parish was renamed from "Barton in the Clay" to "Barton-le-Clay".

=== Ancient history ===
To the southwest of the town, across the A6 is Sharpenhoe Clappers, an Iron Age hill fort.

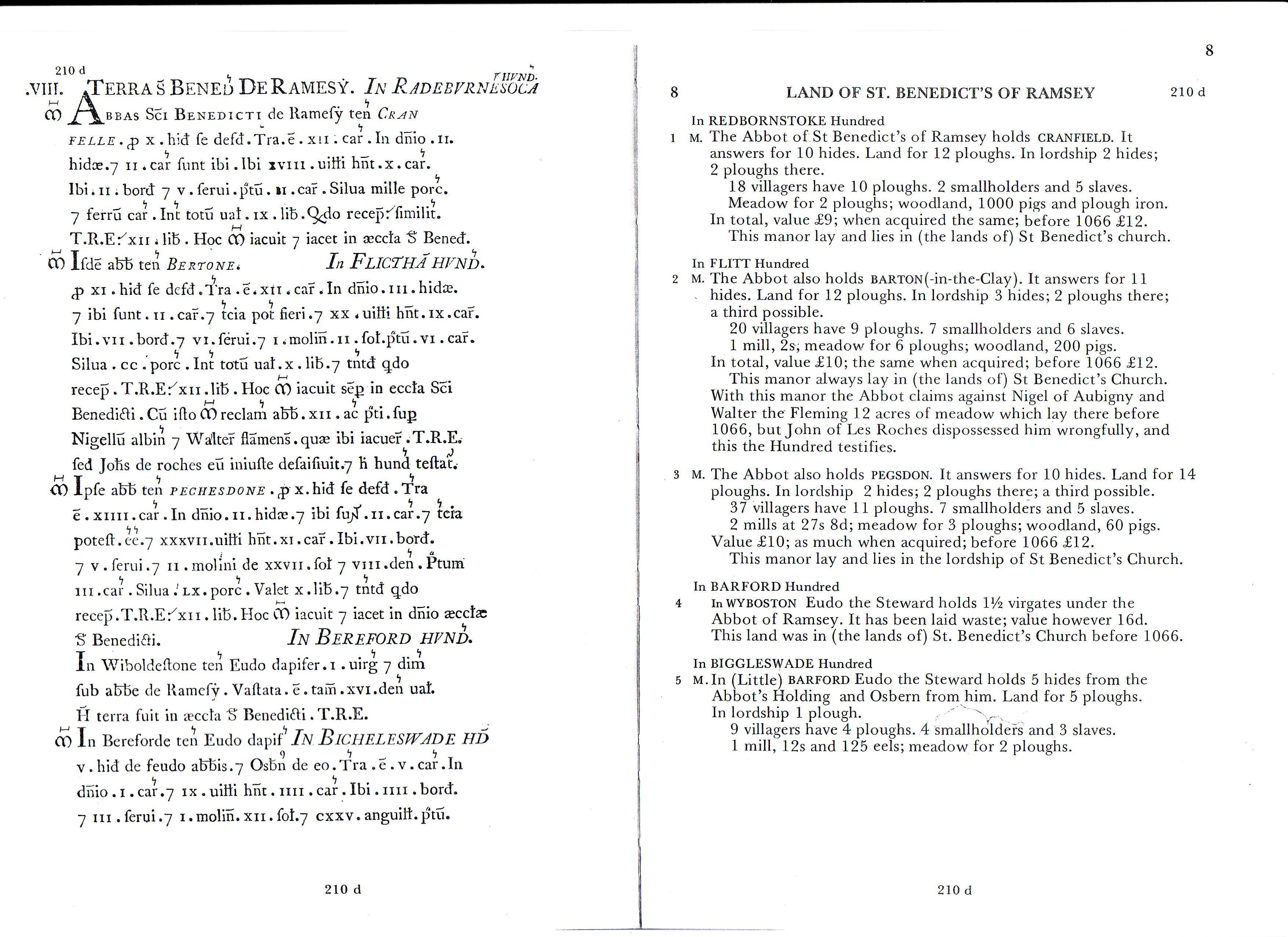
The Barton Domesday Book entry in Latin and English

=== The Domesday Book ===
Barton-Le-Clay Domesday Book entry, taken from 210d 2.

In FLITT Hundred M. The Abbot also holds Barton (in-the-clay). It answers for 11 hides. Land for 12 ploughs. In lordship 3 hides; 2 ploughs there; a third possible. 20 villagers have 9 ploughs. 7 smallholders and 6 slaves. 1 mill, 2s, meadow for 6 ploughs; woodland, 200 pigs. In total, value £10; the same when acquired; before 1066 £12. This manor always lay in (the lands of) St Benedict's Church. With this manor the Abbot claims against Nigel of Aubigny and Walter the Fleming 12 acres (4.9 ha) of meadow which lay there before 1066, but John of Les Roches dispossessed him wrongfully, and this the Hundred testifies.

== Location ==
Barton-le-Clay is in Central Bedfordshire between Bedford and Luton, 36 miles (58 km) north of London. Nearby villages include Sharpenhoe, Silsoe, Westoning and Pulloxhill. The A6 which runs from Luton (6 miles south of the village) bypasses Barton and continues through Bedford (north of the village) to Carlisle. The village bypass was constructed in January 1990.

In the southeast of the parish are the Barton Hills, which form the northeast extremity of the Chiltern Hills and are designated an Area of Outstanding Natural Beauty. Much of this area of chalk downland is now a nature reserve, managed by Natural England.

== Places of worship ==
- Baptist – Hope Chapel
- Church of England – St. Nicholas Church
- Methodist – Barton-le-Clay
- Roman Catholic – St. Matthew (Now closed)

== Schools ==
Two major schools are in Barton: Ramsey Manor Lower School and Arnold Academy, a middle school The lower school takes children of the village. The middle school usually also takes those of Westoning, Silsoe and Greenfield, its children and those new to Barton meet ex-school and geographic criteria of Harlington Upper School admission (13+). The village has a pre-school.

A small private nursery and prep school for children aged 0 to 9, Orchard School & Nursery, is in the parish.

== Transportation ==
The closest railway station is 3.5 miles (5.6 km), somewhat more by footpath, in Harlington. No buses link to this. Bus services through Barton are largely those between Luton, south and Bedford, north. A cross-country route joins Barton to other local villages including Shillington and Shefford. There is a weekly (Tuesday) bus to/from Hitchin in the east.

The roads are well-bypassed so favoured by experienced cyclists, especially in daylight.

== Clubs and groups ==
Barton-le-Clay has a football club (Barton Rovers), who play their home matches at Sharpenhoe Road. The club currently competes in the Southern League Division One Central.

Organisations offer karate and football. A Rotary Club meets at The Bull Hotel. Barton Players, the main local amateur dramatics group, hold plays and summer workshops for children in the village hall. However, it is open to new members who wish to join. There is a youth drama group in the village called Up-Stage, including two branches for young people aged 13 and over, called CentreStage and Stage Right. Barton also hosts Scouting and Guide organisations for all ages. A local history group meets in the library on the last Saturday of each month at 10:30 am.

The village saw the start-up of Lea Sports Reserves, an active team.

== Public services ==
- Barton Library
- GP Surgery
- Dental Surgery Richard Miller-White

== War memorials ==
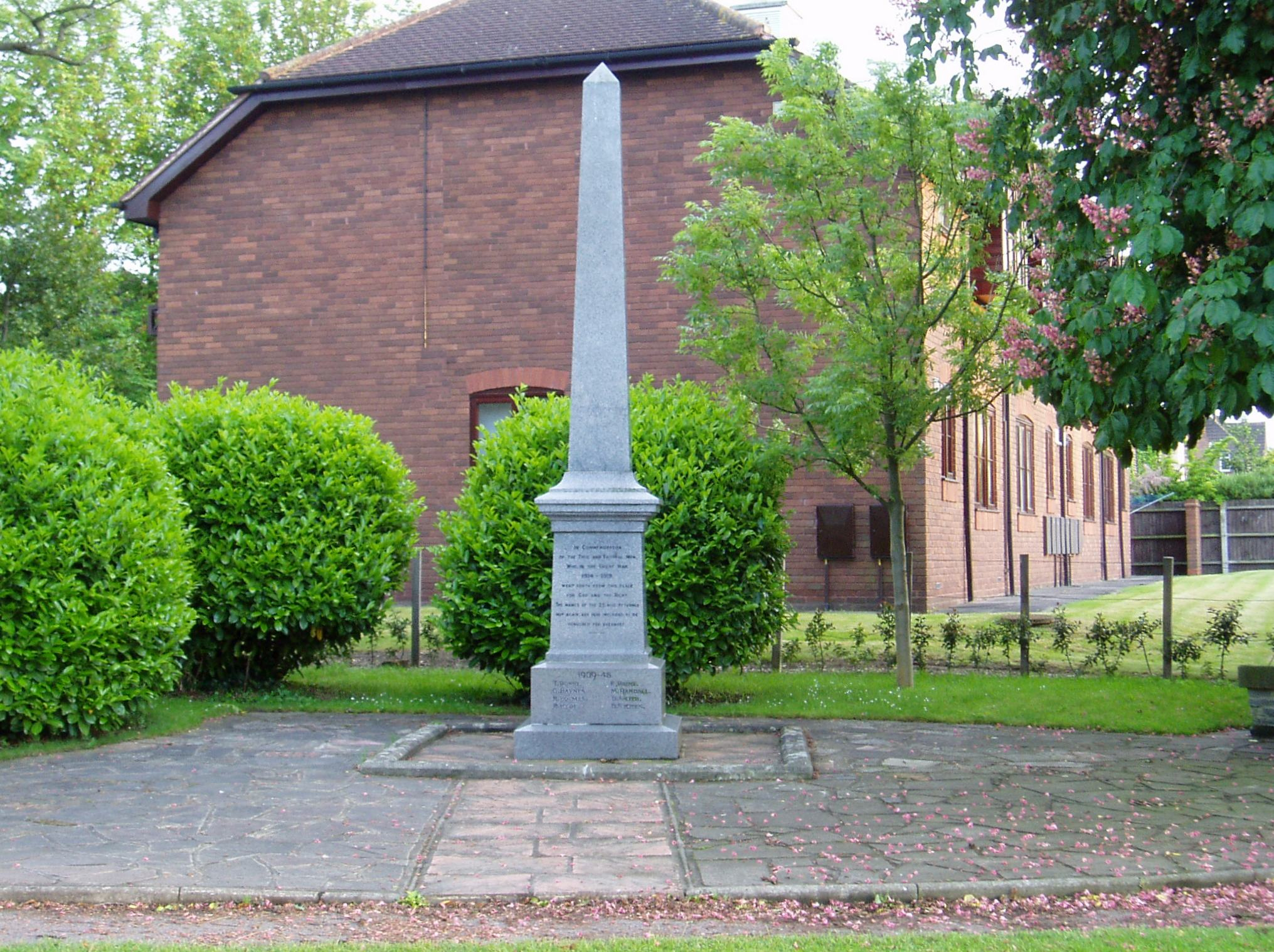
The high street war memorial.

There are two combined World War matching-list memorials, one near the main road (junction of Luton Road and Hexton Road) and the other in the Parish Church. This list is transcribed on a website.

=== St Nicholas Church restoration of 1879 ===
Published by the NOF Digitise Architecture England Consortium.

- St Nicholas Church plans from 1879

== Local newspapers ==
Two weekly newspapers are delivered free to many houses in Barton, with news about Barton and the surrounding area.

- Herald and Post (Luton based) – delivered every Thursday
- Luton and Dunstable Express (previously titled Luton on Sunday, Dunstable on Sunday or Bedfordshire on Sunday) – delivered every Sunday

== See also ==
- Barton-Le-Clay Airfield

== Pictures ==
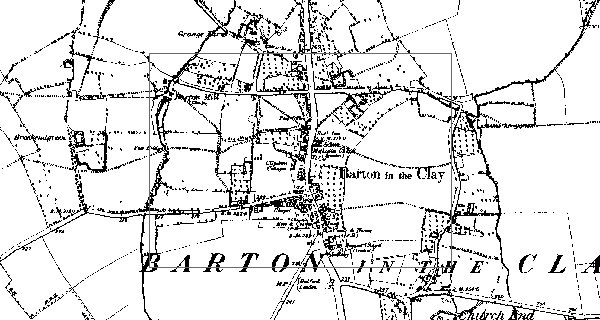
A map of Barton-le-Clay from 1890.

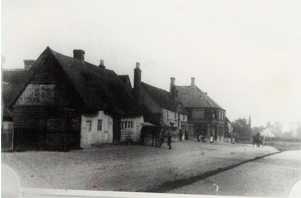
The Bull Hotel in 1902.

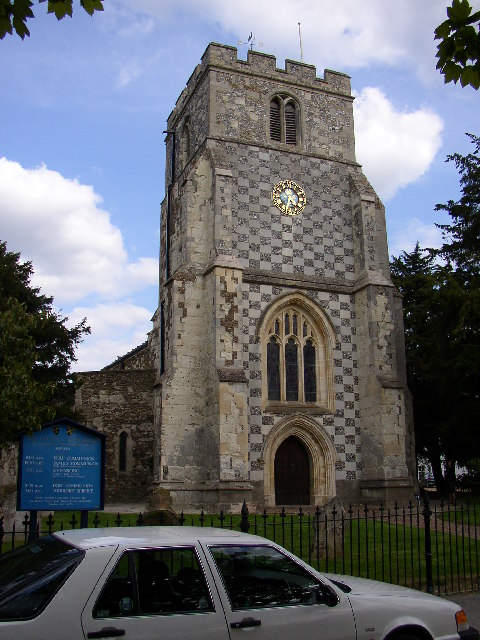
St Nicholas's Church. The tower in perpendicular style with chequered pattern of ashlar stone and cobbles

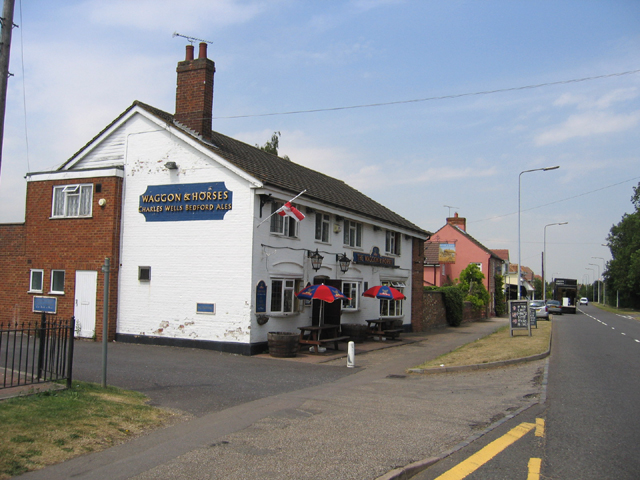
Bedford Road

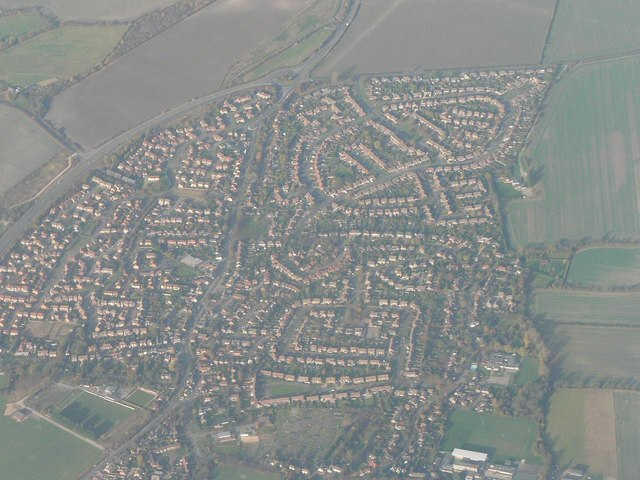
Aerial view

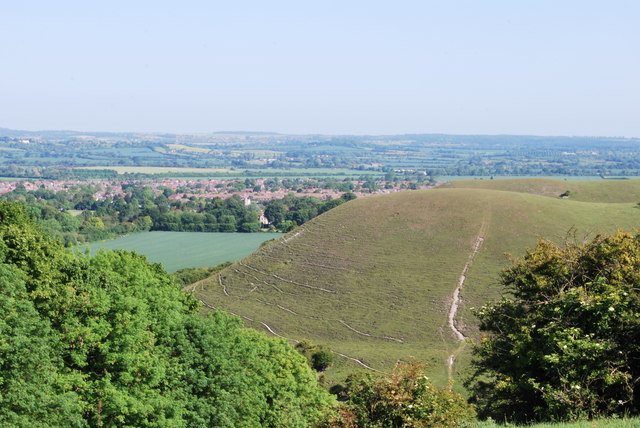
Barton Hills showing their proximity to this place
