= Nicholas-Beazley Pobjoy Special =

Pobjoy Special
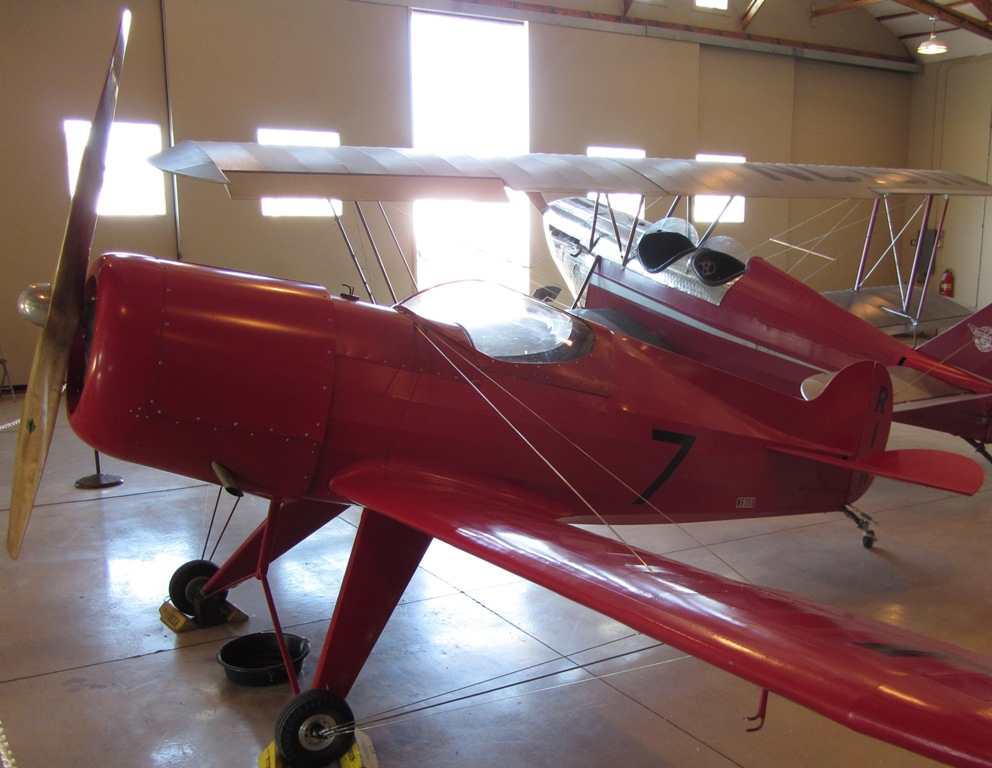
- Pobjoy Special Replica displayed in the EAA Museum at Oshkosh, Wisconsin

General information
- Type: Racing aircraft
- National origin: U.S.
- Manufacturer: Nicholas-Beazley Airplane Company
- Designer: Robert T. Jones
- Status: unknown
- Number built: 1

History
- Introduction date: 1930

The Nicholas-Beazley Pobjoy Special a.k.a. the Nicholas-Beazley Phantom I, a.k.a. the Wittman Phantom, a.k.a. the Flagg Phantom, a.k.a. the Reaver Special was a world record holding air racer of the 1930s.

== Development ==
The Nicholas-Beazley Airplane Company imported a Pobjoy Airmotors engine with a gear reduction unit for use in its new design the Nicholas-Beazley NB-3. Designer Robert T. Jones computed the weight and balance for the setup and proposed a new design as an air racer. Claude Flagg and H. F. Landis built the aircraft in their spare time and patented the wing design.

== Design ==
The fuselage was welded steel with fabric covering. The wings used an early application of lightweight aluminum construction with U-shaped cantilever spars with wire bracing and fabric covering. The aircraft used wheels with small tires and without brakes. The cockpit was open and the engine was fully cowled.

In 1932 the Pobjoy P engine was replaced with a Pobjoy R of 75 horsepower (56 kilowatts). The cockpit was also enclosed. In 1933 Wittman lengthened the fuselage by 21 inches (53 cm), removed the engine cowling, and modified the rudder. In 1946 the engine was replaced with a Continental C-85.

== Operational history ==
In 1932 ownership passed to air racer Steve Wittman. An Air Commerce Bureau inspector fronted the money, and had Wittman race the aircraft to avoid a conflict of interest. The Pobjoy Special is the only racer Wittman raced that he did not build or design himself.

- 1930 National Air Races, Cleveland, Ohio – Registered as R1W. Pilot Danny Fowlie reached 115 mph (185 km/h), placing third in its class with a mismatched propeller.
- 1933 Chicago International Air Races – Pilot Steve Wittman won all races in the 200ci class with a maximum speed of 120 mph (190 km/h).
- 1934 New Orleans, Louisiana – Wittman set the world speed record for aircraft weighing less than 200 kg (440 lb) over a distance of 100 km (62.1 mi), averaging 137.513 mph (221.306 km/h)
- 1934 National Air Races, Cleveland, Ohio – Wittman won all races in the 200ci class with a speed of 129.440 mph (208.313 km/h).
- 1935 National Air Races, Cleveland, Ohio – New owner Percy V. Chaffee won all races in the 200ci class.

In 1936 the 200ci class was eliminated, making the Pobjoy Special obsolete for racing. In 1937 in St. Louis, Missouri, the Pobjoy Special flew its last race.

In 1937 the Pobjoy Special flipped on its back. It was rebuilt, sold, and stored until the end of World War II. John Reaver entered the aircraft as the Reaver Special in the new Goodyear Formula One races.

== Variants ==
In 1998 former owner, Dick Sampson, commissioned an airworthy replica of the Pobjoy Special to be built by Bill Turner of Repeat Aviation. It is configured with the Wittman modifications, a cowled Pobjoy engine, and wooden wings. The aircraft is on display at the EAA Airventure Museum in Oshkosh, Wisconsin.

== Specifications (Pobjoy Special) ==
Data from Sport Aviation

General characteristics

- Capacity: 1
- Length: 21 ft 9 in (6.63 m)
- Empty weight: 355 lb (161 kg)
- Powerplant: 1 × Pobjoy Niagara II Radial, 65 hp (48 kW)

Performance

== Bibliography ==
- Ogden, Bob. Aviation Museums and Collections of North America. 2007. Air-Britain (Historians) Ltd. ISBN 0-85130-385-4.
