= Shadower =

Shadower may refer to:

- Fleet shadower (disambiguation), aircraft designed to tail enemy vessels
  - Airspeed Fleet Shadower
  - General Aircraft Fleet Shadower
- The Shadower 3D, a 2012 experimental art film; see List of 3D films (2005 onwards)
- The Shadowers, a 1964 novel by Donald Hamilton

== See also ==
- Shadowing (disambiguation)
