= G25 =

G25 may refer to:

- G25 Changchun–Shenzhen Expressway in China
- G25 Sniper Rifle, used by the German Armed Forces
- Gribovsky G-25, a Soviet aircraft
- Glock 25, a pistol
- HMAS Nepal (G25), a N-class destroyer of the Royal Australian Navy
- Logitech G25, an electronic steering wheel designed for Sim racing video games
- Zenoah G-25, an aircraft engine
- Global25 (G25), a system used in ancestry modelling
