= Pobjoy P =

1920s British piston aircraft engine

'P'
- Type: Piston radial aero-engine
- National origin: United Kingdom
- Manufacturer: Pobjoy Airmotors
- Designer: Douglas Rudolf Pobjoy
- First run: ca.1926
- Developed into: Pobjoy R

The Pobjoy P was a British seven-cylinder, air-cooled, aircraft engine designed by Douglas Rudolf Pobjoy and built by Pobjoy Airmotors. It became the progenitor of the Pobjoy R/Niagara/Cataract family of small radial engines. A notable feature of the Pobjoy P was the propeller reduction gear which allowed the small engine to operate at more desirable higher speeds.

== Applications ==
- Comper C.L.A.7 Swift
- Parnall Imp

== Specifications (Pobjoy P) ==
Data from Jane's all the World's Aircraft 1928

=== General characteristics ===
- Type: 7-cylinder air-cooled, radial, left-hand tractor
- Bore: 2.83 in (72 mm)
- Stroke: 3.43 in (87 mm)
- Displacement: 151.05 cu in (2.48 L)
- Diameter: 25 in (640 mm)
- Dry weight: 115 lb (52.16 kg)
- Designer: Douglas Rudolf Pobjoy

=== Components ===
- Valvetrain: overhead valves operated by rockers, push-rods and tappets driven by a cam-plate at the rear of the engine
- Fuel system: One Zenith carburetor
- Fuel type: 80% Petrol, 20% Benzol
- Oil system: Dry sump, pressure system at 45 psi (310 kPa)
- Cooling system: Air-cooled
- Reduction gear: Double-helical spur gear 0.524:1

=== Performance ===
- Power output: 60 hp (45 kW) at 3,000 rpm rated output; 67.5 hp (50.3 kW) at 3,300 rpm maximum
- Specific power: 0.397 hp/cu in (18.1 kW/L)
- Specific fuel consumption: 0.35 kg/kWh (0.57 lb/(hp⋅h))
- Oil consumption: 0.018 L/kWh (0.023 imp pt/(hp⋅h))
- Power-to-weight ratio: 0.858 kW/kg (0.522 hp/lb)
