= Pander Multipro =

Multipro
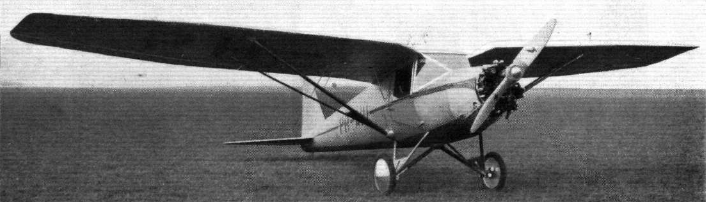

General information
- Type: Two/three seat sports aircraft
- National origin: Netherlands
- Manufacturer: Nederlandse Fabriek van Vliegtuigen H. Pander & Zonen (Pander & Sons)
- Designer: Theo Slot
- Number built: 3

History
- First flight: September 1932

The Pander Multipro was a two/three seat light monoplane aircraft with a high, braced wing, designed in the Netherlands in the early 1930s. Powered by a Pobjoy radial engine, three were built.

== Design ==
Designed by Theo Slot, who was responsible for all of Pander & Sons original designs, the Multipro is variously described as a side-by-side two-seat or three-seat light aircraft. It had high and almost constant chord wings, braced on each side by a V-form pair of struts fixed to the lower fuselage longerons. The fuselage was a rounded, plywood-skinned structure, contemporaries remarking, as they had with other Panders, on the quality of the finish.

It was powered by a Pobjoy R seven-cylinder radial engine; the two-blade propeller was driven via spur gears that reduced its speed and placed the output shaft above the engine centre, an unusual arrangement for a radial. The cabin was under the wing with a deep starboard-side access door and multi-panel glazing. The fuselage tapered aft, with the tailplane set halfway up it, and its fin and rudder together were almost triangular apart from a rounded tip. The Multipro's conventional undercarriage was fixed, with the mainwheels on V-struts attached to the lower longerons and stabilized laterally by an inverted V-strut jointed at the fuselage central underside.

The Multipro flew for the first time in September 1932.

== Operational history ==
In all, three Multipros were built. The first and third were rapidly sold to private individuals; the second remained registered to the Pander works until 1937, when it too was bought privately. All remained on the Dutch civil aircraft register until at least 1939. One, the second aircraft, is known to have been destroyed by German bombing during the invasion of the Netherlands on 10 May 1940.

== Specifications ==
Data from Wesselink

General characteristics

- Capacity: two or three
- Length: 7.80 m (25 ft 7 in)
- Wingspan: 11.30 m (37 ft 1 in)
- Gross weight: 720 kg (1,587 lb)
- Powerplant: 1 × Pobjoy R 7-cylinder, air-cooled geared radial, 63 kW (85 hp)

Performance

- Maximum speed: 175 km/h (109 mph, 94 kn)
