= Fleet shadower =

Fleet Shadower can refer to either of two aircraft designed to tail enemy vessels.

- Airspeed Fleet Shadower
- General Aircraft Fleet Shadower
