= Autogiro Company of America AC-35 =

AC-35
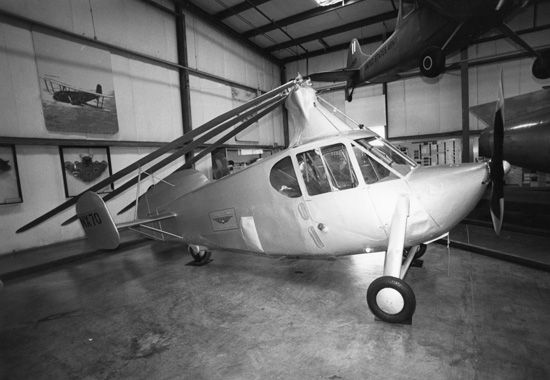

General information
- Type: Autogyro
- National origin: United States of America
- Manufacturer: Autogiro Company of America

History
- First flight: March 26, 1936

The Autogiro Company of America AC-35 was an early attempt to make a roadable aircraft in the United States during the 1930s. Although it was successfully tested, it did not enter production; a 1960s attempt to revive the aircraft in a non-roadable version also failed to achieve success.

== Design and development ==
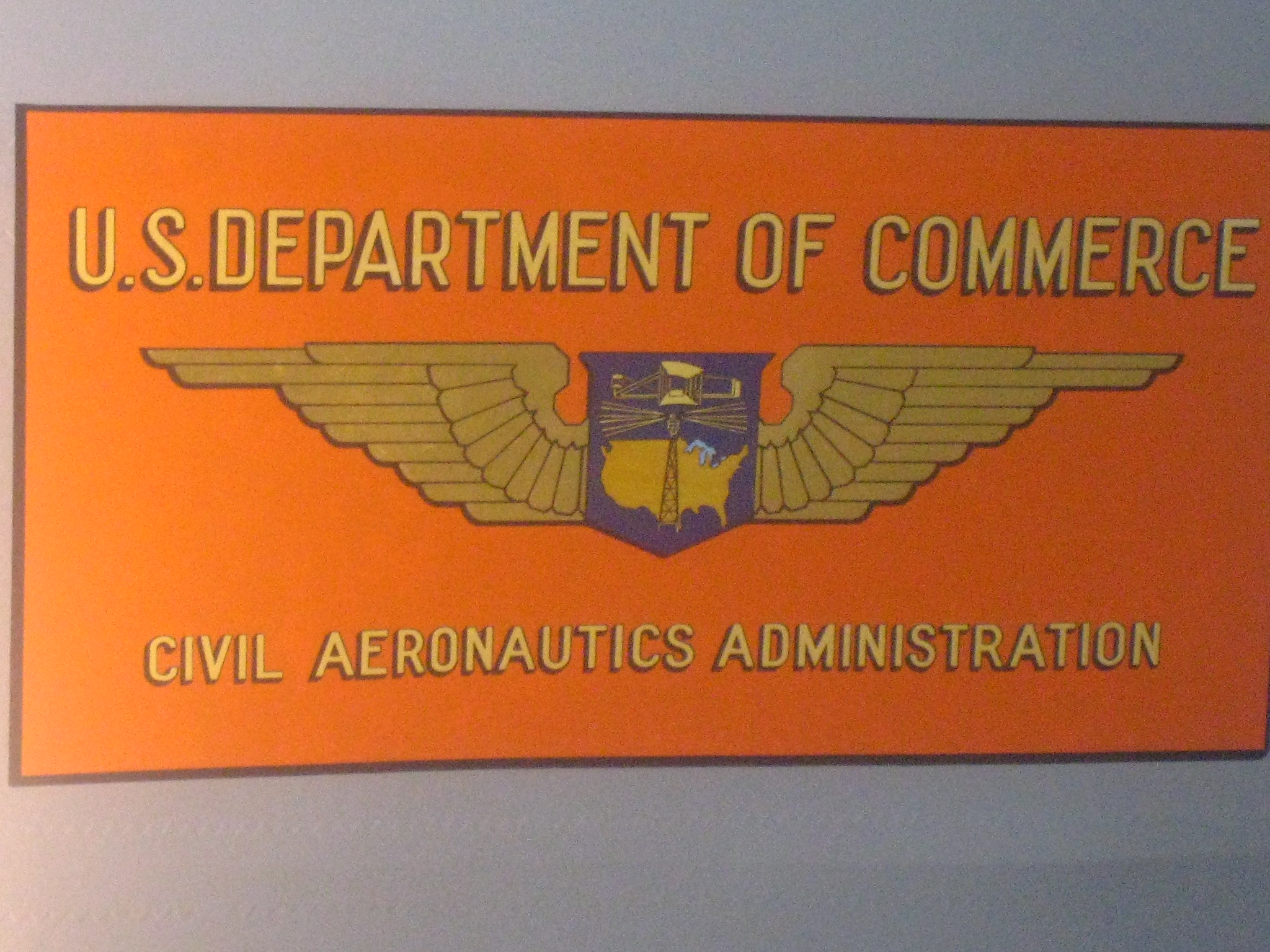
logo on side of the AC-35

The aircraft design process started in 1935. The Experimental Development Section of the Bureau of Air Commerce contracted the building of a roadable aircraft based around an PA-22 autogyro from ACA's parent company, Pitcairn Autogiro Company. The vehicle could fly at high speed in the air, and drive at up to 25 mph (40 km/h) on the ground with its rotors stowed. Six other companies were contracted to produce a roadable aircraft, but the AC-35 was the only one that met all the requirements.

The AC-35 had side-by-side seating with a small baggage compartment. The fuselage was a combination of steel tube in front, and wood construction in the tail with fabric covering overall. The engine was rear mounted with a shaft driven forward propeller. The vehicle had three equal size wheels (two in front, one in the rear). The rear wheel was shaft driven from the engine and the front wheels provided steering.

== Operational history ==
On March 26, 1936, the AC-35 was flown by test pilot James G. Ray with counter rotating propellers. These were later replaced with a single conventional propeller arrangement. On October 2, 1936, Ray landed the AC-35 in a downtown park in Washington, D.C., where it was displayed on October 26, 1936. The aircraft was converted to roadable configuration. Ray drove it to the main entrance of the Commerce Building where it was accepted by John H. Geisse, chief of the Aeronautics Branch. It was driven to Bolling Field for additional testing and review by Hap Arnold.

The aircraft was tested by the Autogiro Company of America at Pitcairn Field until 1942. In 1950 the Bureau of Air Commerce transferred the AC-35 to the Smithsonian Institution.

== Variants ==
In 1961, Skyway Engineering Company. Inc. in Carmel, Indiana, licensed the AC-35 with an intent to produce a non-roadable variant, powered by a 135-hp Lycoming O-290-D2Bs engine. One example was built and test flown out of Terry Field in Indianapolis, but did not go into production as the company failed.

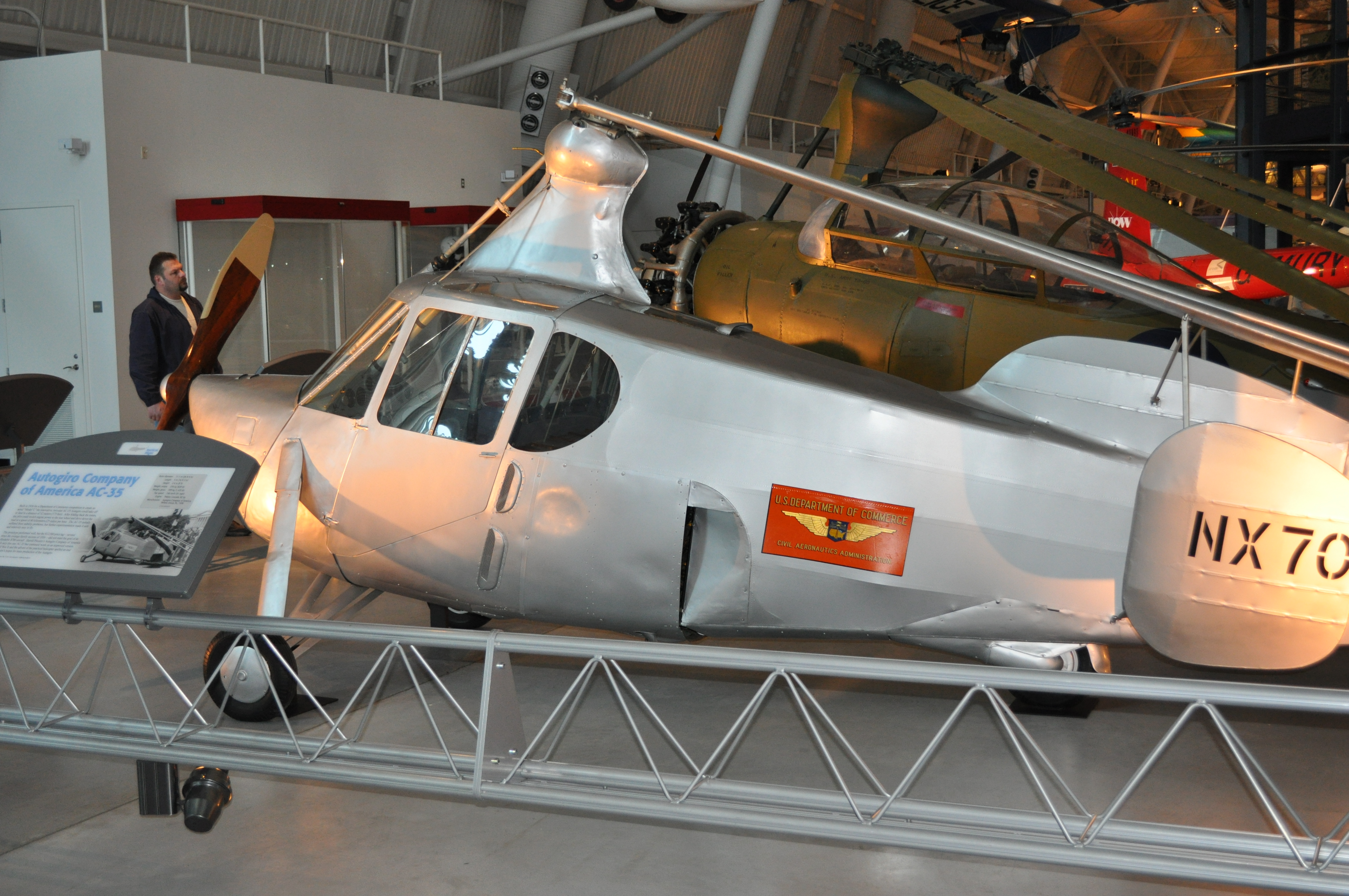
Autogiro AC-35 at NASM

== Specifications (AC-35) ==
Data from Cierva Autogiros: The Development of Rotary-Wing Flight

General characteristics

- Capacity: 2
- Length: 16 ft 3 in (4.95 m)
- Powerplant: 1 × Pobjoy Cascade , 90 hp (67 kW)
- Main rotor diameter: 34 ft 3 in (10.44 m)

Performance

- Cruise speed: 75 mph (121 km/h, 65 kn)

== See also ==
Aircraft of comparable role, configuration, and era

- Buhl A-1 Autogyro
- Hafner Rotabuggy
