= Nicholas-Beazley NB-8G =

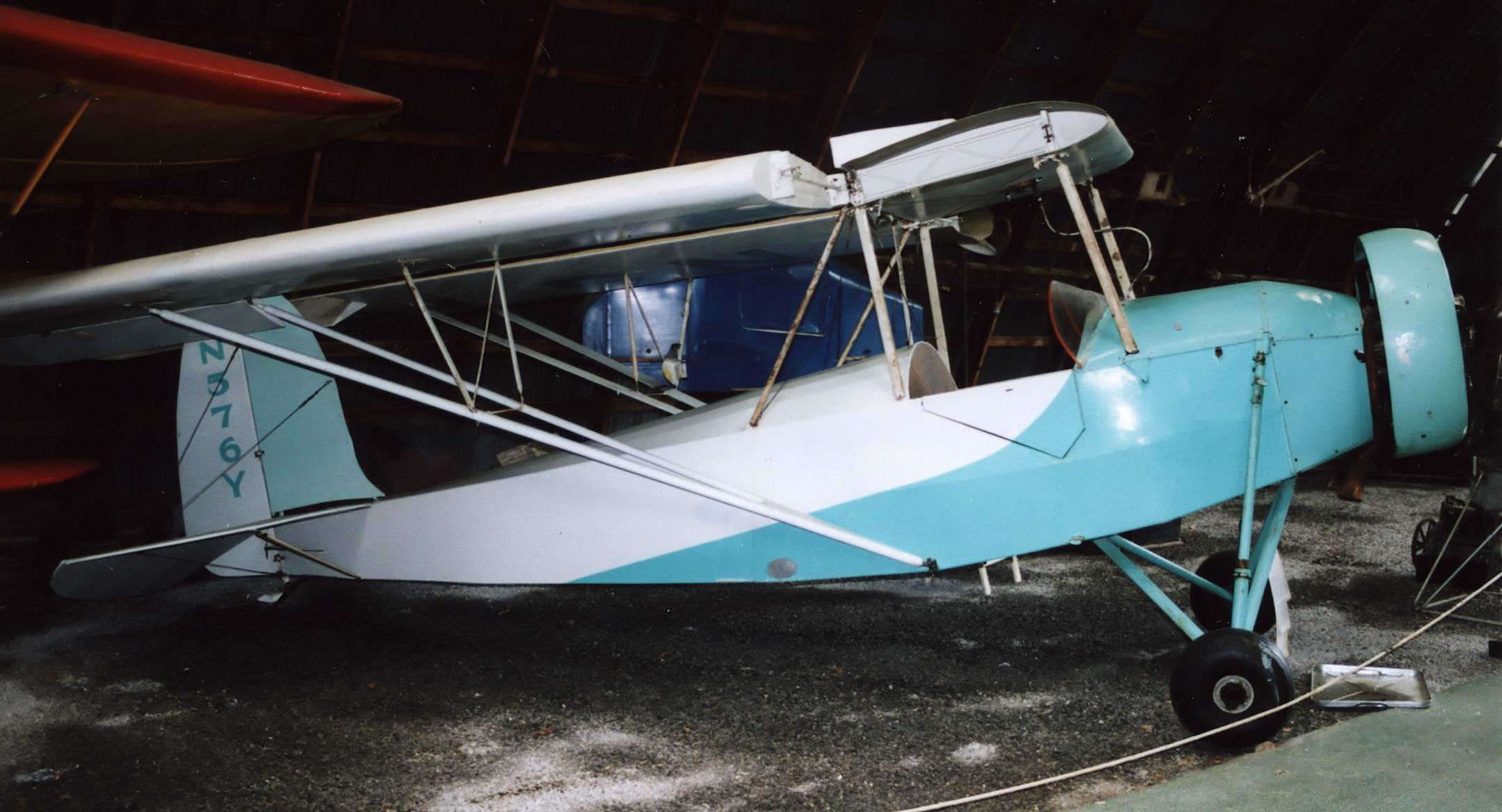
- Nicholas-Beazley NB-8G of 1931, at the Old Rhinebeck Aerodrome museum, New York State, June 2005

General information
- Type: light parasol wing monoplane
- National origin: United States
- Manufacturer: Nicholas-Beazley Airplane Company
- Designer: Tom Kirkup
- Status: several airworthy in 2009
- Primary user: private owner pilots
- Number built: 57

History
- Introduction date: 1931
- First flight: 1931

The Nicolas-Beazley NB-8G is a United States two-seat parasol wing light monoplane that was constructed in the early 1930s.

== Development ==
The NB-8G was designed and built by the Nicholas-Beazley Airplane Company at its factory in Marshall, Missouri. The first of 57 examples flew in 1931, and most are powered by the Armstrong-Siddeley Genet Mark II engine of 80 hp (60 kW) Some were later fitted with the 80 hp (60 kW) Lambert engine.

The aircraft has a high strut-mounted parasol wing that can be folded to reduce hangarage space required and to permit towing by road. The two crew seats are arranged side-by-side. Initially the cockpit was open, but some examples later had an enclosure fitted. Production ceased in 1935.

== Operational history ==
The NB-8G was advertised for sale at $1,790. It was fully aerobatic. 57 examples were purchased, mainly by private pilot owners in the United States.

Six examples were still extant in 2009, with at least two being fully airworthy. Examples of these can be viewed at the Old Rhinebeck Aerodrome museum in New York State, and the Historic Aircraft Restoration Museum at Creve Coeur airfield near St Louis Missouri.

== Specifications (NB-8G Genet-powered) ==
Data from Aerofiles

General characteristics

- Crew: 1
- Capacity: 1 passenger or traineee pilot
- Length: 20 ft 3 in (6.17 m)
- Wingspan: 37 ft 6 in (11.43 m)
- Useful lift: 493 lb (224 kg)
- Powerplant: 1 × Armstrong-Siddeley Genet II 5-cylinder radial , 80 hp (60 kW)

Performance

- Maximum speed: 110 mph (177 km/h, 96 kn)
- Cruise speed: 83 mph (134 km/h, 72 kn)
- Stall speed: 40 mph (64 km/h, 35 kn)
- Range: 400 mi (644 km, 350 nmi)
- Service ceiling: 18,000 ft (5,486 m)
