= Nicholas-Beazley Airplane Company =

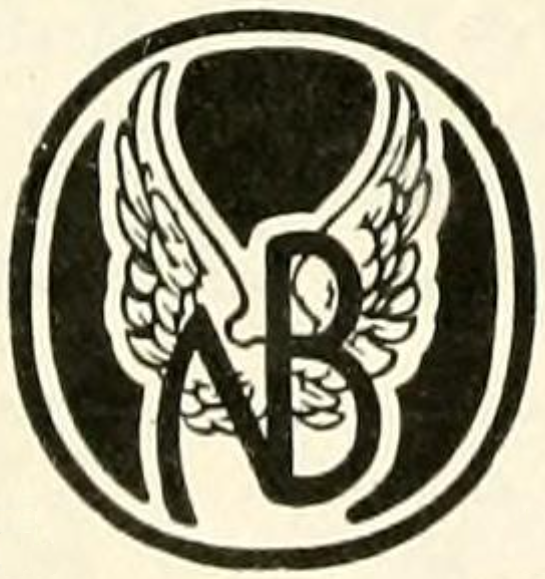
- Industry: Aircraft parts and manufacturing
- Predecessor: Central Aviation Company
- Founded: 1921
- Defunct: 2 May 1938
- Fate: Sold to Air Associates Inc in 1938.
- Headquarters: Marshall, Missouri
- Key people: Russell Nicholas and Howard Beazley
- Number of employees: 67 in 1929
- Subsidiaries: Marshall Flying School

Nicholas-Beazley Airplane Company was an American aircraft manufacturer of the 1920s and 1930s

== History ==
In 1921, the Nicholas-Beazley Airplane Company was founded by Russell B. (Penny) Nicholas and Howard Beazley. Nicholas started Central Aviation Company reselling surplus propellers, and in 1924 renamed the company to reflect the addition of Howard Beazley as partner. Nicholas-Beazley Airplane Company started as a reseller of surplus Curtiss OX-5 parts through mail-order catalogs, expanding into a wide variety of airplane construction materials. Nicholas-Beazley resold 57 Armstrong-Siddeley Genet engines originally sold by Fairchild, becoming the US distributor. Surplus Standard J aircraft were modified and marketed by the company.

In 1927, Walter Barling was hired to engineer the first in-house aircraft, the Barling NB-3. The aircraft was advertised as being able to right itself from any position with the hands off the controls, and spin-proof. In 1929, Tom Kirkup was hired to design the NB-8G. 57 units were completed and sold. At its peak, the company produced as many as one aircraft per day. In 1937, production of aircraft ceased, after the Great Depression.

The Nicholas-Beazley Aircraft Company Museum resides at Marshall Memorial Municipal Airport in Marshall, Missouri, featuring a NB-3 on display.

== Aircraft ==
Model name	First flight	Number built	Type
NB-3	1928	76	Low wing monoplane
NB-4	1930	8	three place low wing monoplane
NB-8G	1931	57	Parasol
Pobjoy Special	1930	1	Racing aircraft
