= Spartan Clipper =

Clipper
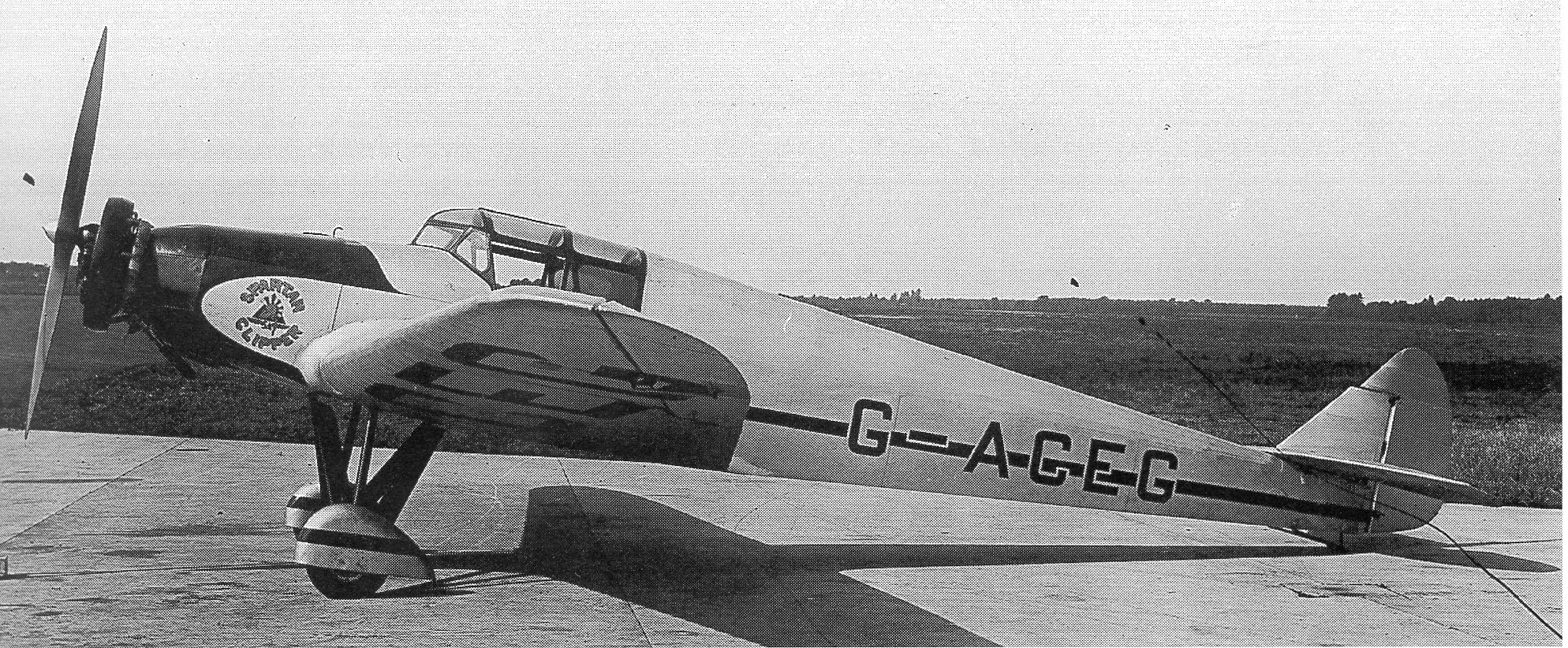

General information
- Type: Civil touring aeroplane
- Manufacturer: Spartan Aircraft Limited
- Designer: H.E. Broadsmith
- Primary user: Spartan Aircraft Limited
- Number built: 1

History
- Manufactured: 1932
- First flight: 14 December 1932
- Retired: Destroyed 4 May 1942

The Spartan Clipper was a British light touring aeroplane of the 1930s. It was a single-engine, two-seat, low-wing monoplane with a fixed tailwheel undercarriage.

== Development ==
H.E. Broadsmith designed the Clipper as a two-seater; he employed the outer wings of the Monospar ST-4. Spartan Aircraft Limited built one example at their East Cowes works in 1932. The aeroplane was initially fitted with a 75-hp Pobjoy R motor. Registered G-ACEG it flew for the first time on 14 December 1932. After modification to undercarriage, cabin glazing and cowling, it received a Certificate of Airworthiness on 29 June 1933.

In 1933 the Clipper was raced in the King's Cup Race.

In 1938, it was re-engined with a Pobjoy Niagara III of 90-hp, after which it was used as a company hack until 4 May 1942, when it was destroyed in an air raid on Cowes.

== Specifications ==
Data from British Civil Aircraft since 1919, Volume 3, Saunders and Saro aircraft since 1917

General characteristics

- Crew: 2
- Length: 28 ft 2 in (8.59 m)
- Wingspan: 34 ft 0 in (10.36 m)
- Height: 6 ft 7 in (2.01 m)
- Wing area: 150 sq ft (14 m^{2})
- Empty weight: 770 lb (349 kg)
- Gross weight: 1,300 lb (590 kg)
- Fuel capacity: 140 lb (64 kg) fuel and oil
- Powerplant: 1 × Pobjoy R 7-cylinder air-cooled geared radial piston engine, 75 hp (56 kW)
- Propellers: 2-bladed fixed-pitch propeller

Performance

- Maximum speed: 110 mph (180 km/h, 96 kn)
- Rate of climb: 800 ft/min (4.1 m/s)
