= Pitcairn PA-22 =

- The PA-22 demonstrating over Washington, 8 November 1934

General information
- Type: Experimental, direct control autogyro
- National origin: United States
- Manufacturer: Autogiro Company of America
- Number built: 1

History
- First flight: April 1933

The 1933 experimental Pitcairn PA-22 was one of the first wingless autogyros. It was controlled by movement of the rotor plane rather than the usual control surfaces, though initially the much modified lone example retained rudders as a precaution.

== Design and development ==
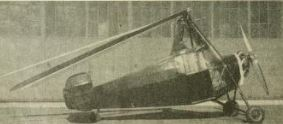
The rotor folded back for storage

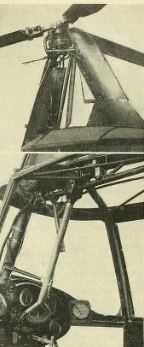
The rotor head, with an inverted control stick visible below

The first autogyros, while relying on the rotor for lift, were controlled in flight with ailerons, elevators and rudders like conventional fixed wing aircraft. The first United States autogyro to dispense with these was the PA-22, which the pilot manoeuvred by altering the rotor plane with a long hanging stick which reached down into the cabin; such designs were termed direct control autogyros. Direct control meant the aircraft could be controlled at the lowest speed at which sufficient lift was available, rather than the higher speeds required for control surface authority. First flown in April 1933, it was first demonstrated in public in Washington, D.C., on 8 November 1934.

The PA-22 had a three-bladed rotor with a diameter of 32 ft (9.8 m), pylon-mounted over the cockpit. It was connected via a clutch to the nose-mounted, 85 hp (63 kW) Pobjoy Cataract engine to spin it up, with rotor blades latched at a low angle of incidence, then unlatched for take-off. Uncowled for cooling and driving a two-bladed propeller, the Cataract powered the PA-22 conventionally once autorotation was established, in standard autogyro fashion.

Behind the engine the fuselage of the PA-22 was conventional, with two side-by-side seats in a flat-sided cabin with generous glazing including windows for both upward and downward views. Access was via side doors. Its tail included a constant chord tailplane, mounted above the fuselage, which carried twin fins inboard of its rounded tips. In the early stages of this much-modified airframe, the fins carried rudders as a precaution but experience of direct control allowed their removal.

The PA-22 had a split axle, fixed tailwheel undercarriage. Its design was similar to that of many fixed wing and autogyro aircraft, with the axles and their rearward drag struts mounted on the central fuselage underside. Long shock-absorbing legs were attached to the upper fuselage. The front wheels were further forward than on other aircraft, making the fraction of weight on the tailwheel greater than usual. Because there was no wing lift involved, it was not necessary to lift the tail during take-off. All three tyres were pneumatic and the tailwheel was steerable.

Another unusual feature of the PA-22 was its foldable rotor. Like other autogyros, the rotor blades were hinged to the drive shaft in the plane of the rotor. In flight, each blade's movement was limited to a few degrees by a pin but these could be removed and the blades folded back manually on the ground. With no wings, hangar space was minimized.

The compact footprint when folded encouraged hopes for a roadable version. This emerged as the Autogiro AC-35, aerodynamically similar and with a foldable rotor but with a centrally-positioned engine. This drove a tractor propeller in flight via a long drive shaft and the tailwheel on the ground through another shaft. It did not reach production and most of Pitcairn's later aircraft had wings, though the PA-36 was an exception. Kellett Autogiro Company's slightly later wingless Kellett KD-1 autogyro had more commercial success.

== Specifications ==
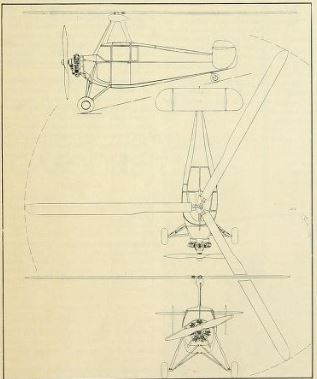
PA-22

Data from

General characteristics

- Crew: 2
- Length: 18 ft (5.5 m)
- Empty weight: 600 lb (272 kg) approximately
- Gross weight: 1,140 lb (517 kg) approximately
- Fuel capacity: 17 US gal (14 imp gal; 64 L)
- Powerplant: 1 × Pobjoy Cataract seven cylinder radial, 85 hp (63 kW)
- Main rotor diameter: 3 × 32 ft (9.8 m)
- Propellers: 2-bladed

Performance

- Maximum speed: 105 mph (169 km/h, 91 kn)
- Cruise speed: 90 mph (140 km/h, 78 kn)
- Approximate minimum speed: 17 mph (27 km/h; 15 kn)
- Approximate take off speed: 25 mph (40 km/h; 22 kn)
- Range: 350 mi (560 km, 300 nmi)
