= CLW Curlew =

Training aircraft

Curlew
- Flight Global archive

General information
- Type: Demonstrator and trainer
- National origin: United Kingdom
- Manufacturer: CLW Aviation Co.Ltd.
- Designer: Arthur Levell and Francis Welman
- Number built: 1

History
- First flight: 3 September 1936

The CLW Curlew was a two-seat, single-engined training aircraft built partly to demonstrate a new wing structure. It flew successfully in the UK in 1936, but the company went bankrupt and only one Curlew flew.

== Design and development ==
In the early 1930s Francis Welham and Arthur Levell conceived a new single spar duralumin wing structure that promised weight savings without loss of strength. It was quite different from the already established Monospar design. The wing was built around a cross braced, girder-like box, with the front and rear members attached to it with cantilever ribs. With financial support from S.W. Cole of EKCO radio, they set up a company known by their initials as CLW Aviation, based at Gravesend, Kent and built a wing for testing. This performed to the calculations even under destructive testing, and the company decided to produce a small aeroplane using it. The CLW Curlew was intended both as a demonstrator and as a trainer for those pilots going on to modern, fast monoplanes. It was also seen as a contender in the open two-seater market, particularly for the richer buyer after a machine with "snappier" performance. It made its first flight on 3 September 1936 at Gravesend, flown by the ex-Beardmore pilot A.N. Kingwill.

The Curlew was an all-metal aeroplane, apart from the fabric covering of its elliptical, cantilever wing, and so an unusual light plane for its time. The wing carried short span Frise ailerons outboard. The rest of the trailing edge carried manually operated split flaps. The fuselage was a monocoque structure, built on duralumin ovals and stringers, covered with stress bearing Alclad sheet. The engine installation was particularly neat for a radial. The 7-cylinder 26.5 in (673 mm) diameter 90 hp (67 kW) Pobjoy Niagara came as a "power-egg" complete with all accessories and its own long chord cowling, plus Pobjoy's characteristic "smiley" front baffle. The similarity to inline installations was enhanced by the upward off-set of the drive shaft of the two-bladed propeller, caused by the gearbox. The two generous open cockpits were in tandem, the front one at mid wing and the other at the trailing edge. The empennage was conventional: a slender fin carried a rounded, unbalanced rudder which extended down the bottom of the fuselage, and the tapered, mid-fuselage tailplane carried separate elevators so the rudder could move between them. The undercarriage had vertical (in flying position) legs from the wings with a large (3 in or 76 mm) movement, each sloping outwards slightly to increase the track and braced inwards by struts from halfway down the legs to the wing roots.

Sqn Ldr F.W.H.Lervill (another CLW director) had clear ideas on training aircraft and the Curlew was intended to place the pupil at the front to familiarise him or her with the sensation of flying alone. He also chose not to fit wheel brakes, for he thought they were likely to confuse the novice.

After its first flight, the Curlew successfully completed its initial trials, which include a terminal velocity dive at 305 mph (491 km/h) and a maximum loaded weight producing a wing loading of 14 lb/sq ft (68 kg/m^{2}). Landing speed with flaps down was 38 mph (61 km/h). The machine was advertised as suitable for other engines up to powers of 130 hp (97 kW) and the de Havilland Gipsy Major was specifically mentioned. Though Cole had by this time withdrawn his financial support, things for a short while looked bright for CLW, with talk of an Australian order for 50 Curlews, but they were over extended and went bankrupt. Plans for a twin-engined light transport using a similar wing structure were abandoned. The sole Curlew, registered G-ADYU and built at a cost of £10,000 went to Essex Aero, also of Gravesend, in the asset sale. It then went to Martlesham Heath and gained its Certificate of Airworthiness on 19 November 1936. It seems to have done little flying after that, and was put up for sale in July 1938. Stored during the war, it was broken up in 1948.

== Specifications ==
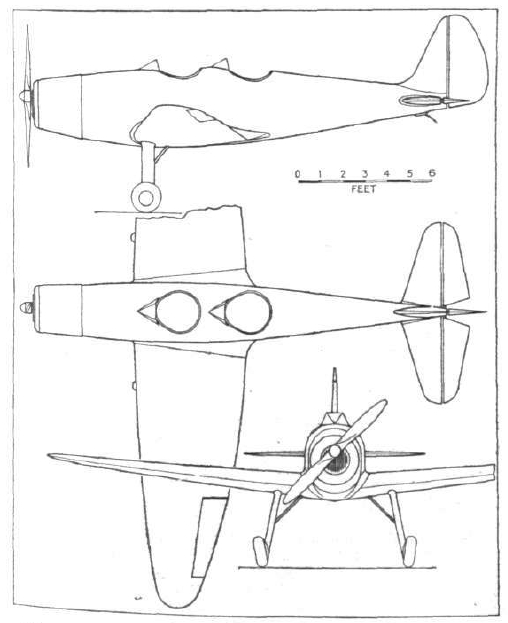
General arrangement drawing of the Curlew. Flight Global archive

Data from Ord-Hume 2000, pp. 299–300

General characteristics

- Crew: 2
- Length: 21 ft 6 in (6.55 m)
- Wingspan: 27 ft 0 in (8.23 m)
- Height: 9 ft 0 in (2.74 m)
- Wing area: 116 sq ft (10.8 m^{2})
- Empty weight: 970 lb (440 kg)
- Gross weight: 1,500 lb (680 kg)
- Powerplant: 1 × Pobjoy Niagara III 7-cylinder radial engine, geared down by 0.47:1, 90 hp (67 kW)

Performance

- Maximum speed: 120 mph (190 km/h, 100 kn)
- Cruise speed: 110 mph (180 km/h, 96 kn)
- Range: 380 mi (610 km, 330 nmi)
