= Shapley Kittiwake =

Kittiwake

General information
- Type: Two-seat gull wing monoplane
- National origin: United Kingdom
- Manufacturer: Shapley Aircraft Limited
- Designer: Errol Spencer Shapley
- Number built: 2

History
- Manufactured: 1937–1938
- First flight: 1937

The Shapley Kittiwake was a 1930s British two-seat gull wing monoplane designed and built by Errol Spencer Shapley at Torquay, Devon.

== Development ==
The Kittiwake was a monoplane with a gull wing and a fixed landing gear. The first aircraft, a Mark 1 registered G-AEZN, with a single-seat open cockpit and powered by a 50 hp (37 kW) Continental A50 piston engine, was first flown at Roborough in June 1937 but was damaged in a crash landing later that year. The second aircraft, a Mark 2 registered G-AFRP, was a larger two-seat cabin monoplane powered by a 90 hp (67 kW) Pobjoy Niagara III engine, and first flew at Roborough in 1938.

The Mark 1 aircraft was dismantled before the Second World War. The Mark 2 was stored during the war, only to crash on Dartmoor in December 1946.

== Specifications (Mark 2) ==
Data from

General characteristics

- Crew: 1
- Capacity: 1
- Length: 20 ft 10 in (6.35 m)
- Wingspan: 32 ft 0 in (9.76 m)
- Empty weight: 901 lb (409 kg)
- Gross weight: 1,600 lb (726 kg)
- Powerplant: 1 × Pobjoy Niagara III , 90 hp (67 kW)

Performance

- Cruise speed: 110 mph (176 km/h, 96 kn)
