= Pobjoy R =

1920s British piston aircraft engine

R
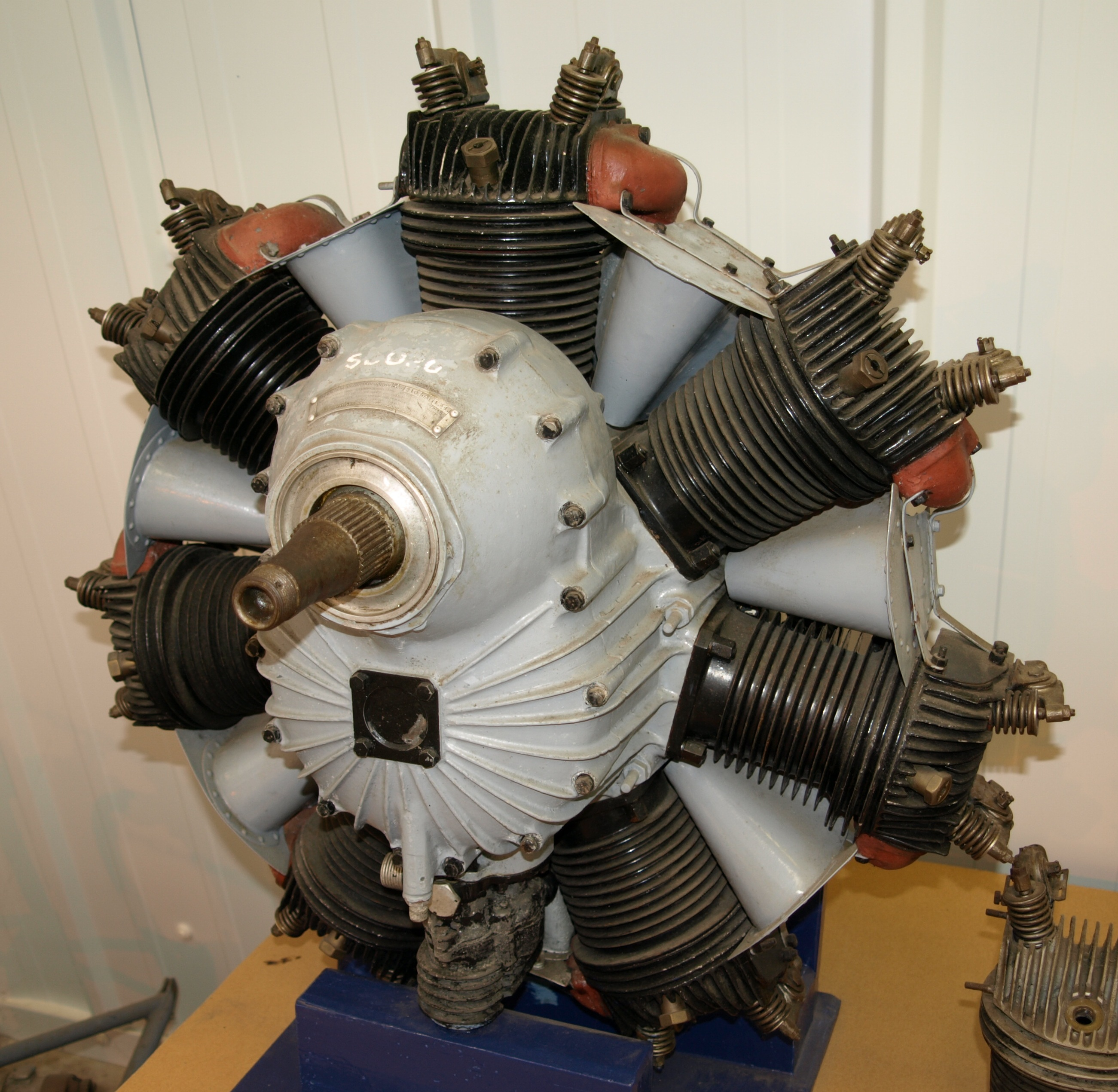
- Preserved Pobjoy R at the Shuttleworth Collection
- Type: Piston radial aero-engine
- Manufacturer: Pobjoy Airmotors
- First run: 1926
- Major applications: BA Swallow; Comper Swift

The Pobjoy R is a British seven-cylinder air-cooled radial aircraft engine designed and built by Pobjoy Airmotors. Introduced in 1926, it was a popular engine for ultralight and small aircraft in the 1930s. A notable feature of the Pobjoy R was the propeller reduction gear which allowed the small engine to operate at more desirable higher speeds.

The engine was license produced in Czechoslovakia by Walter Aircraft Engines as the Walter Mira.

== Variants ==
Walter Mira R
License produced version of Pobjoy R.
Walter Mira I-R
Renaming of Mira R.
Walter Mira II-R
Developed version of the Mira R producing 95 hp (70 kW).

== Applications ==
- British Aircraft Swallow
- Cierva C.25
- Comper Kite
- Comper Swift
- Cosmopolitan Light Plane
- Couzinet 101
- Farman F.239
- Fauvel AV.10
- Fieseler F 3
- General Aircraft Monospar
- Hendy Hobo
- Kay Gyroplane
- Landgraf H-2
- Letov Š-139
- Lippisch Delta IV
- Mauboussin M.121P Corsaire Major
- Miles Satyr
- Nicholas-Beazley Pobjoy Special
- Nozawa X-I
- Pander Multipro
- Praga E.214
- Přikryl-Blecha PB-5 Racek
- Savoia-Marchetti SM.80bis
- Short Scion
- Short Scion Senior
- Spartan Clipper
- Swanson-Fahlin SF-1

Walter Mira

- Letov Š-39
- Letov Š-139

== Engines on display ==
A preserved Pobjoy R engine is on display at the Shuttleworth Collection, Old Warden, Bedfordshire.

Two Pobjoy R engines, one installed in the remains of Comper Swift (R222 / LV-FBA) will be soon on display at the National Aviation Museum in Buenos Aires Province, Argentina.

== Specifications (Pobjoy R) ==
Data from Lumsden.

=== General characteristics ===
- Type: 7-cylinder air-cooled, radial, left-hand tractor
- Bore: 3.03 in (77 mm)
- Stroke: 3.43 in (87 mm)
- Displacement: 173.05 cu in (2.84 L)
- Diameter: 25.5 in (650 mm)
- Dry weight: 135 lb

=== Components ===
- Oil system: Dry sump
- Cooling system: Air-cooled

=== Performance ===
- Power output: 85 hp
- Specific power: 0.5 hp/cu in
- Fuel consumption: 4.9 imp. gallons per hour
- Power-to-weight ratio: 0.63 hp/lb

== See also ==
Related development

- Pobjoy Niagara

Comparable engines

- Rotec R2800

Related lists

- List of aircraft engines
