= Pobjoy Pirate =

British touring aircraft

Pirate

General information
- Type: Three-seat touring aircraft
- National origin: United Kingdom
- Manufacturer: Pobjoy Airmotors and Aircraft Ltd, Rochester airport, Kent
- Designer: Harold Boultbee
- Number built: 1

History
- First flight: 25 June 1935

The Pobjoy Pirate was a three-seat, high-wing monoplane designed to compete with the de Havilland Leopard Moth using a low-power but light Pobjoy radial engine. Flight tests showed the Pirate to be uncompetitive and its development was rapidly abandoned.

== Design and development ==
The success of the three-seat, high-wing de Havilland Leopard Moth, introduced in 1933, had proved that there was a market for this class of aircraft. Until 1935 Pobjoy Airmotors Ltd had not previously built an aircraft, but concentrated successfully on engines. In June 1935 the company name was changed to Pobjoy Airmotors and Aircraft Ltd and at the same moment they introduced their only original aircraft design, the Pobjoy Pirate, aimed at the Leopard Moth market. They naturally chose to power it with one of their own seven cylinder radial engines. At the time, the most powerful variant was the 90 hp (67 kW) Niagara III, much less powerful than the 145 hp (108 kW) Gipsy Major 10 of the Leopard Moth. The Pobjoy, though was less than half the weight of the de Havilland engine and Pobjoy believed that with the advantage of this weight saving (about 160 lb or 73 kg) they could build a lighter and smaller aircraft that would perform as well.

The designer of the Pirate was the experienced Harold Boultbee, who had recently produced the Civilian Coupé, and construction began early in 1935. The high wings were straight edged, but tapered, slightly swept on the leading edge and fully slotted. The trailing edge carried differential ailerons and interacting flaps. A pair of V-shaped lift struts ran from the two wing spars down to the lower fuselage side where there was a universal joint to facilitate wing folding. The folding mechanism was unusual: unlocked, the wings slid forward and tipped leading edge down, so that when the front spar was released from its fitting the wings could fold rearwards and downwards about the rear spar. Because of the initial forward movement, the folded length was less than it would have been with conventional geometries.

The fuselage was of wooden construction, plywood-covered and tapering strongly in elevation to the tail. The fin was triangular and carried a semicircular rudder moving above the tailplane and elevators. The main undercarriage oleo legs were attached close to the fuselage end of the lift struts. A glazed cabin placed the pilot ahead of the two side-by-side seated passengers. Ahead of them, the Niagara, under a characteristically neat Pobjoy cowling with "helmet" exhaust ports drove a two-bladed propeller.

In mid-1935 Pobjoy were collaborating with Shorts over the Pobjoy powered Short Scion, so Short's test pilot, John Lankester Parker was available to try the Pirate. It first flew on 25 June and by 10 July had been in the air for a total of 70 minutes. Parker reported that the machine was underpowered and uncompetitive and it was never flown again. It was registered as G-ADEY but never carried these letters; it was broken up the following summer.

The Pirate was lighter and smaller than the Leopard Moth: the span was 3 ft 6 in (1.07 m) or 10% smaller and the all-up weight 624 lb (283 kg, 28%) lighter, but this did not make up for the 38% decease in power.

== Specifications ==
Data from Ord-Hume 2000, pp. 454

General characteristics

- Wingspan: 34 ft 0 in (10.36 m)
- Wing area: 180 sq ft (17 m^{2}) estimate
- Gross weight: 1,600 lb (726 kg)
- Powerplant: 1 × Pobjoy Niagara III 7-cylinder radial, 90 hp (67 kW)

Performance

- Maximum speed: 125 mph (201 km/h, 109 kn)
