= Kay Gyroplane =

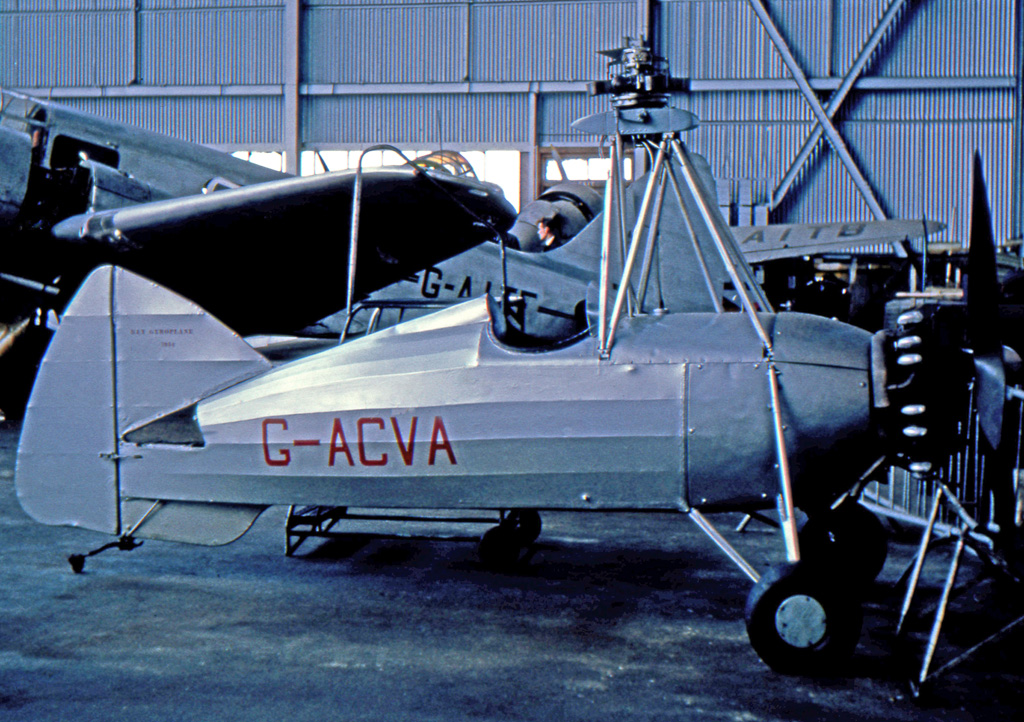
- The Gyroplane at Scone Airport in 1967 after restoration to static display standard

General information
- Type: Single-seat autogyro
- National origin: United Kingdom
- Manufacturer: Oddie, Bradbury and Cull Limited
- Designer: David Kay
- Status: On display
- Primary user: the designer
- Number built: 1 (32/1); 1 (33/1)

History
- Introduction date: 1935
- First flight: 18 February 1935
- Retired: 1947

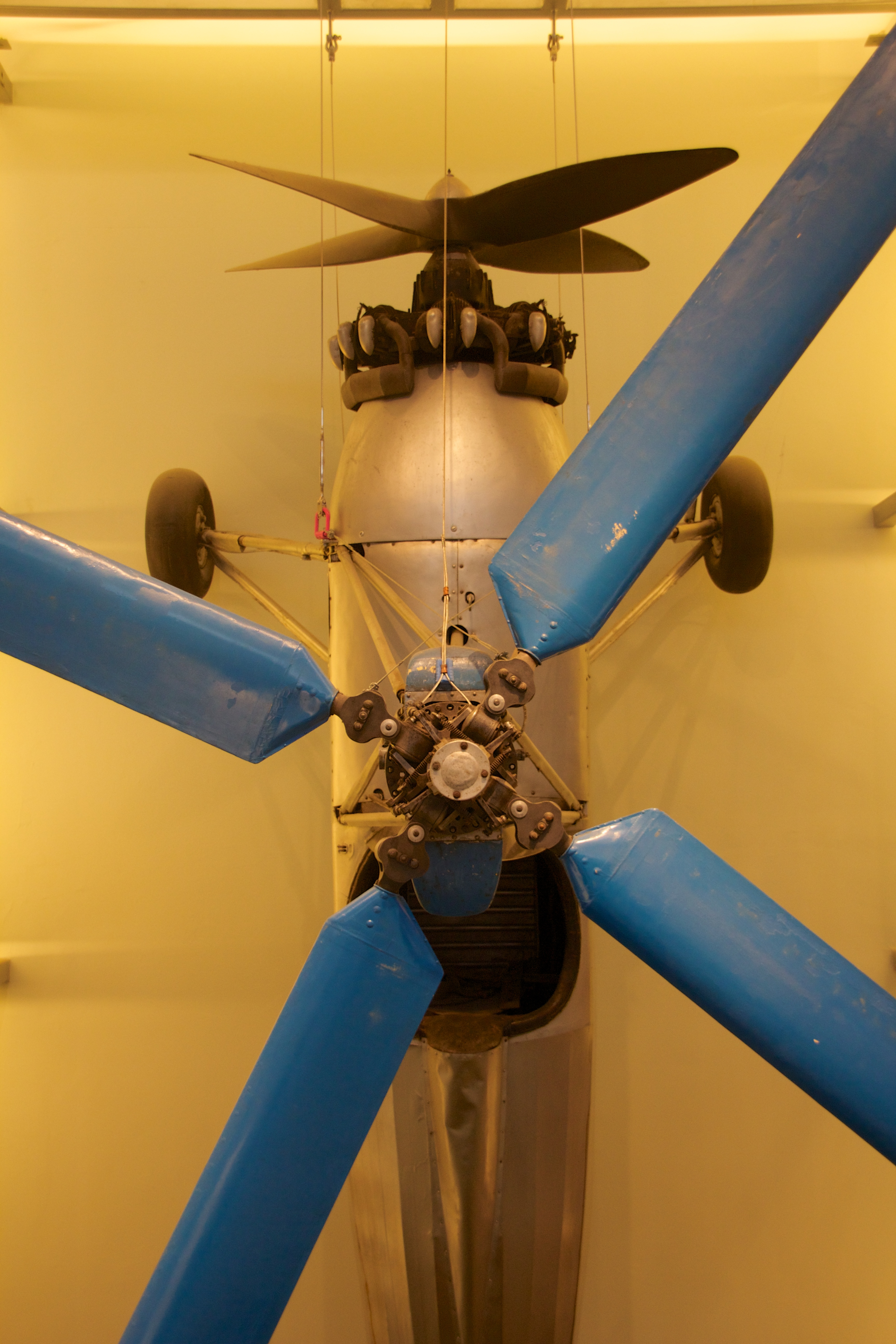
Type 33/1 on display at the National Museum of Scotland.

The Kay Gyroplane Type 33/1 was a 1930s British single-seat autogyro design by David Kay.

== Design and development ==
David Kay had first flown an autogyro (the Type 32/1) in 1932 but it was damaged in early 1933 and not repaired. Kay then designed a larger single-seat autogyro, the Type 33/1 and contracted Oddie, Bradbury and Cull Limited of Southampton to build two fuselages.

The first autogyro, registered G-ACVA, first flew on 18 February 1935 from Eastleigh Airport. The second autogyro was not completed. Following the last flight of G-ACVA on 16 August 1947 at Perth Airport (Scotland) at Scone, it was stored there for many years. It was then refurbished at Scone in 1967 and loaned to the Museum of Transport, Glasgow. The autogyro was then purchased from the Kay family by the National Museums Scotland and is on display in the main museum building in Chambers Street, Edinburgh.

== Variants ==
Type 32/1
Single-seat autogyro powered by an ABC Scorpion piston engine.
Type 33/1
Single-seat autogyro powered by a Pobjoy R piston engine.

== Aircraft on display ==
On display at National Museum of Scotland in Edinburgh, Scotland.

== Specifications ==
Data from British Civil Aircraft since 1919 - Volume 3

General characteristics

- Crew: 1
- Length: 5.46 m (17 ft 11 in)
- Empty weight: 301 kg (664 lb)
- Gross weight: 417 kg (920 lb)
- Powerplant: 1 × Pobjoy R piston engine , 56 kW (75 hp)
- Main rotor diameter: 6.71 m (22 ft 0 in)

== See also ==
Related lists

- List of rotorcraft
