= Nicholas-Beazley NB-3 =

NB-3
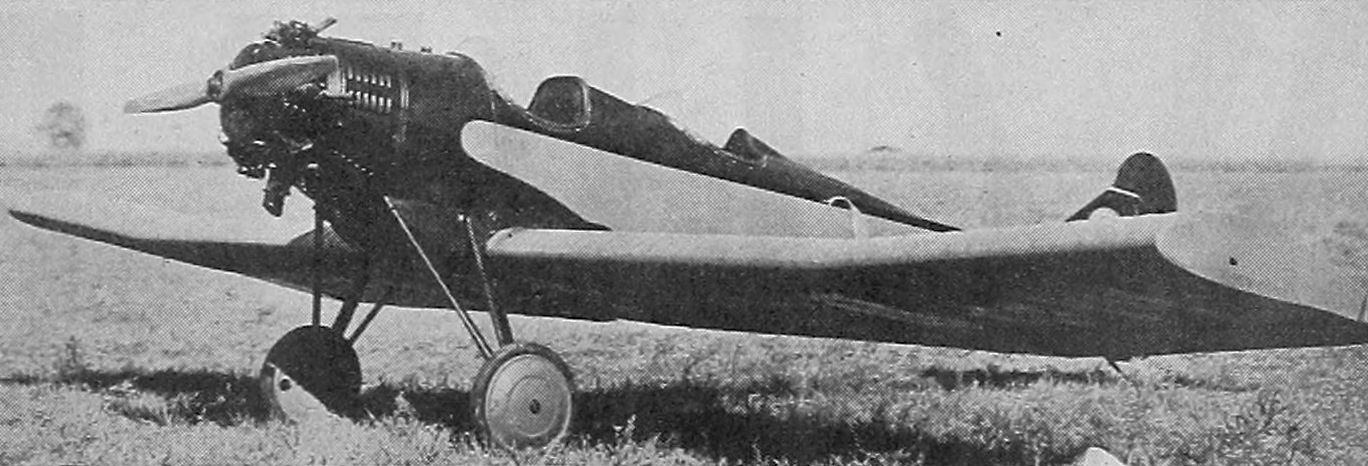
- Barling NB-3

General information
- Type: Sport trainer
- National origin: United States
- Manufacturer: Nicholas-Beazley Airplane Company
- Designer: Walter Barling
- Number built: 20

History
- First flight: February 1928

The Nicholas-Beazley NB-3, or Barling NB-3, is a two-seat, training aircraft of the 1920s.

== Design ==
The Barling NB-3 was designed by Walter Barling in 1927. The aircraft was advertised as being able to right itself from any position with hands off the controls and also as being spin-proof. The NB-3 is a low-wing, tandem-seat, open-cockpit aircraft with conventional landing gear. The fuselage was constructed of welded chrome-moly steel tubing with aircraft fabric covering. The wings used a unique double-layered corrugated aluminum skin with a smooth exterior that required custom presses to handle the various thicknesses of material along the span. The center section was straight with dihedral in the outer bays. The spar was also aluminum with a U-shaped profile. The aircraft was powered by an Anzani 3-cylinder radial engine, Superior radial or LeBlond 60-5-D. The main gear used long struts attached to the upper fuselage for the largest landing gear geometry. The NB-3 fuselage was widened, giving one cockpit a side-by-side seating arrangement to accommodate three people. The new aircraft was named the NB-4.

== Operational history ==
The NB-3 was test flown by Claude Sterling in February 1929. The plane competed in the 1929 National Air Races, placing first or second in events in its class. The Marshall Flying School advertised the NB-3 as a one-day-to-learn-to-fly aircraft with students flying in the morning, an aerodynamics class, learning how to weld by mid-afternoon, salesmanship, and a leisure round of boxing and swimming by evening. Ruth Alexander established a new world record for altitude in 1930 using an NB-3 over San Diego, California. A NB-3 is on display at the N-B plant's hometown airport in Marshall, Missouri.

== Variants ==
NB-3
60 hp (45 kW) Anzani powered - 3 built
NB-3G
Armstrong-Siddely Genet Mk II 80 hp (60 kW)
NB-3L
Lambert 90 hp (67 kW)
NB-3V
Velie M-5 60 hp (45 kW) 1 built
NB-4G
Side-by-side variant with Armstrong-Siddely Genet Mk II 80 hp (60 kW)
NB-4L
Side-by-side variant with Lambert 90 hp (67 kW). ATC#365 issued 12-13-1930
NB-4W
Side-by-side variant with Warner 90 hp (67 kW). ATC#386 issued 12-13-1930

== Specifications (NB-3) ==
Data from Aeronautics

General characteristics

- Crew: 1
- Capacity: 1
- Length: 21 ft 11 in (6.68 m)
- Wingspan: 32 ft 9 in (9.98 m)
- Airfoil: Barling 90-A
- Powerplant: 1 × Anzani , 60 hp (45 kW)
- Propellers: 2-bladed

Performance

- Maximum speed: 87 kn (100 mph, 160 km/h)
- Cruise speed: 74 kn (85 mph, 137 km/h)
- Stall speed: 52 kn (60 mph, 97 km/h)
