= Hendy Hobo =

Hobo

General information
- Type: Single-seat light monoplane
- Manufacturer: Hendy Aircraft Company
- Designer: Basil Henderson
- Number built: 1

History
- Manufactured: 1929
- Introduction date: 1929
- First flight: 1929
- Retired: 1940

The Hendy 281 Hobo was a British single-seat light monoplane designed by Basil B. Henderson and built by the Hendy Aircraft Company at Shoreham Airport in 1929. Only one aircraft was built, registered G-AAIG, and first flown in October 1929 by Edgar Percival.

It was a small low-wing cantilever monoplane with a fixed tailskid landing gear and powered by a 35 hp ABC Motors Scorpion II engine. It was rebuilt in 1934 with a 90 hp Pobjoy Cataract, mass balance ailerons and a modified landing gear.

== Operational life ==
Under the ownership of Lord Patrick Stuart it was entered in many races in the 1930s and in 1934 won a race between Hatfield and Cardiff at 125.4 miles per hour (201.8 km/h). In the summer months of 1935 the Hendy Hobo was operated out of Hall Caine Airport, Isle of Man. Under the control of Flight lieutenant R. Duncanson, a former Chief Flying Instructor at the London Air Park and who had recently set up a flying school at Hall Caine. The Hendy Hobo captivated visitors and locals alike by performing a series of aerobatics over Ramsey Bay.

== Loss ==
On 30 August 1940 it was destroyed by German bombing at Lympne Aerodrome.

== Specifications (Hobo) ==
Data from A.J. Jackson, British Civil Aircraft since 1919 Volume 3, 1974, Putnam, London, ISBN 0-370-10014-X, Page 252

General characteristics

- Crew: 1
- Length: 19 ft 6 in (5.94 m)
- Wingspan: 32 ft 0 in (9.75 m)
- Gross weight: 650 lb (295 kg)
- Powerplant: 1 × Pobjoy Cataract , 90 hp (67 kW)

Performance

- Maximum speed: 130 mph (210 km/h, 110 kn)
