= Pobjoy Airmotors =

Pobjoy Airmotors and Aircraft Ltd.
- Industry: Aerospace
- Founded: 1928
- Defunct: c.1935
- Fate: Sold
- Successor: Short Brothers
- Headquarters: Rochester, Kent, UK
- Key people: Douglas Pobjoy
- Products: Aero engines

Pobjoy Airmotors and Aircraft was a British manufacturer of small aircraft engines. The company was purchased by Short Brothers shortly before the start of World War II, production continuing until the end of the war.

== History ==
Douglas Rudolf Pobjoy started in the engine business working with Roy Fedden at Cosmos Engineering just after the end of World War I. Cosmos went bankrupt shortly after the war, and its assets were picked up by the Bristol Aeroplane Company, where Fedden would go on to produce a line of extremely successful engines.

Pobjoy also spent time in the RAF as an education officer. Here he met Flt. Lt. Nicholas Comper who went on to design the Comper Swift, that would later fly from London to Australia in 9 days 2 hours. Pobjoy partnered with Parnall to develop an engine for the Swift. Although they felt that a cast-block inline engine like the ones being produced by Cirrus and de Havilland would always be less expensive, they nevertheless selected the radial layout for their design, feeling that the cost would be more than offset by the lighter weight and higher performance his designs would offer. Douglas Pobjoy later took over the design, and started a company of his own to produce it at Hooton Park in the Wirral.

The Parnall/Pobjoy design, the 7-cylinder 67 hp Pobjoy P, received its 50-hour type rating in 1928. This was followed in 1929 by the 75/80 hp Pobjoy R, that became very successful, notably on the General Aircraft Monospar. Later designs included the 85/90 hp Pobjoy Cataract, replacing the Pobjoy R, and the 130 hp Pobjoy Niagara of 1934. The Niagara was used on a number of designs by Shorts designers, notably the Short Scion Senior and the original half-scale prototype for the Short Stirling, the S.31. The Niagara's compact size and excellent performance led to it being used on the General Aircraft GAL.38 and Airspeed AS.39 extremely long-endurance slow-flying "Fleet Shadower" prototypes produced to Air Ministry specification S.23/27" where they maximized airflow over the wings.

In 1934, Pobjoy Airmotors moved its plant to Rochester, Kent, to be closer to its largest customer, Shorts. The move, and the ongoing effects of the Great Depression, drove the company into financial difficulty, and it was eventually bought outright by Shorts. The company was made public in 1935. Douglas Pobjoy then moved on to designing de-icing equipment for high-altitude flights.

During the Second World War, Pobjoy ran a section of Rotol Airscrews of Gloucester, England, and was responsible for the design and development of an airborne generator, intended for use on the Short Shetland flying boat. The unit consisted of a flat-six sleeve-valve air-cooled petrol engine driving the generator. This was installed inboard on the aircraft, and due to the incorrect closure of the cooling ducts the engine overheated and the resulting fire destroyed the prototype Shetland. It seems that the project was abandoned at this stage.

After the war Pobjoy designed a new tractor. On 4 July 1948, he was returning from a sales trip to Helsinki when the Scandinavian Airlines Douglas DC-6 in which he was flying was involved in the 1948 Northwood mid-air collision. All 38 passengers in both aircraft were killed.

== Aircraft ==
- Pobjoy Pirate

== Engine designs ==
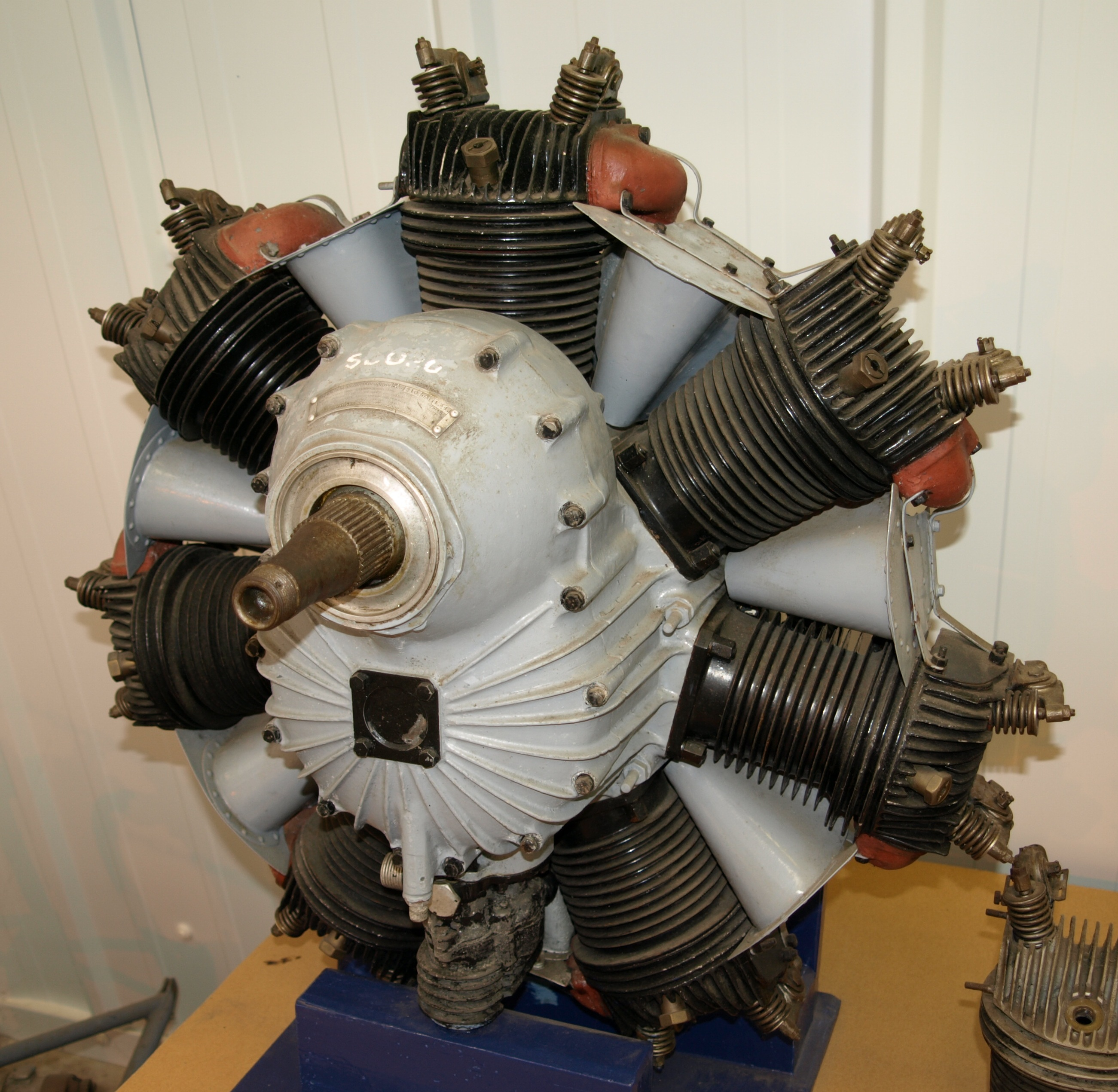
The Pobjoy 'R'.

- Pobjoy P (1928)

7-cylinder radial, air-cooled, geared, 2,480 cc, 67 hp (50 kW)

- Pobjoy R (1933)

7-cylinder radial, air-cooled, geared, 2,835 cc, 85 hp (63 kW)

- Pobjoy Cataract I-III (1934-6)

7-cylinder radial, air-cooled, geared, 2,835 cc, three marks with take-off powers from 80-98 hp (60-73 kW)

- Pobjoy Cascade (1934)

7-cylinder radial, air-cooled, direct drive version of Cataract I, 2,835 cc, take-off power 70 hp (52 kW)

- Pobjoy Niagara I-IV (1936-7)

7-cylinder radial, air-cooled, geared, cowled, 2,835 cc, four marks with take-off powers from 84-98 hp (63-73 kW)

- Pobjoy Niagara V (1937)

7-cylinder radial, air-cooled, geared, cowled, 3,138 cc, take-off power 142 hp (106 kW)

== See also ==
Related lists

- List of aircraft engine manufacturers
