= Gribovsky G-25 =

General information
- Type: Tandem seat biplane basic trainer
- National origin: USSR
- Designer: Vladislav Gribovsky
- Number built: 1

History
- First flight: 1937

The Gribovsky G-25 (Russian: Грибовский Г-25) was a Soviet tandem seat biplane basic trainer built in the late 1930s. It was hoped to minimize unit costs by using a modified automobile engine but the G-25 did not reach production.

== Design and development ==
The G-25 was probably Gribovsky's only biplane design, aimed to compete with the Polikarpov U-2 as a basic trainer. Its economic construction was partly based on its use of a Western engine originally designed for automobiles. It was a single bay biplane with large forward stagger. The lower wing was mounted on the lower fuselage longerons with N-form interplane struts between it and the upper wing, which was supported over the fuselage on cabane struts.

The G-25 was initially powered by a British made, 63 kW (85 hp) Pobjoy Niagara II, a small radius seven cylinder radial engine with an off-set, geared down propeller shaft. The 1937 first flight was made with this unit but in 1938 the light, air-cooled radial was replaced by a GAZ-Avia-11, a 6-cylinder water-cooled adapted motor-vehicle engine derived from the Dodge D5; the aircraft was redesignated G25bis. The new engine produced the same power as the Pobjoy but was some 70 kg (154 lb) heavier, lowering performance. Water cooling required a prominent central radiator under the rear of the engine. The first GAZ-Avia-11 in the G-25bis was that previously tested in the Gribovsky G-23bis-GAZ and was not a success in either design, though when it was replaced by a new GAZ-11 the G-25bis performed rather better.

Behind the engine the fuselage was flat sided, with rounded upper decking. The tandem open cockpits were sited close together, the rear one over the lower wing trailing edge. The G-25's empennage was conventional, with its horizontal tail mounted on top of the fuselage. The vertical tail had a parabolic profile and an unbalanced rudder which reached down to the keel. The biplane's tail skid undercarriage had main wheels mounted on a single axle, hinged from the rear with a pair of struts to the fuselage underside and with a pair of forward leaning, faired shock absorber struts.

With the Pobjoy engine the performance and manoeuvrability of the G-25 was judged outstanding. After the GAZ-11 engine was fitted the G-25bis was demonstrated at the air show at Tushino on 18 August 1938. it was hoped to build five further examples for flight testing but the disappointing performance with the heavier engine, coupled with the greater flexibility in other rôles of the Polikarpov U-2, led to the end of flight trials in November 1938.

== Variants ==
G-25
Pobjoy Niagara II 7-cylinder radial engine
G-25bis
GAZ-Avia-11 6-cylinder inline engine

== Specifications (G-25) ==
Data from Gunston (1995), p. 80

General characteristics

- Crew: Two
- Length: 6.4 m (21 ft 0 in)
- Wingspan: 9.0 m (29 ft 6 in)
- Wing area: 23.0 m^{2} (248 sq ft)
- Empty weight: 430 kg (948 lb)
- Gross weight: 630 kg (1,389 lb)
- Fuel capacity: 40 kg (88 lb) with oil
- Powerplant: 1 × Pobjoy Niagara II 7-cylinder radial, 63 kW (85 hp)

Performance

- Maximum speed: 170 km/h (110 mph, 92 kn)
- Range: 280 km (170 mi, 150 nmi)
- Service ceiling: 3,500 m (11,500 ft)
- Take-off distance: 40 m (131 ft)
- Landing speed: 55 km/h (34 mph; 30 kn)
- Landing distance: 60 m (197 ft)
