= Pobjoy Niagara =

Niagara
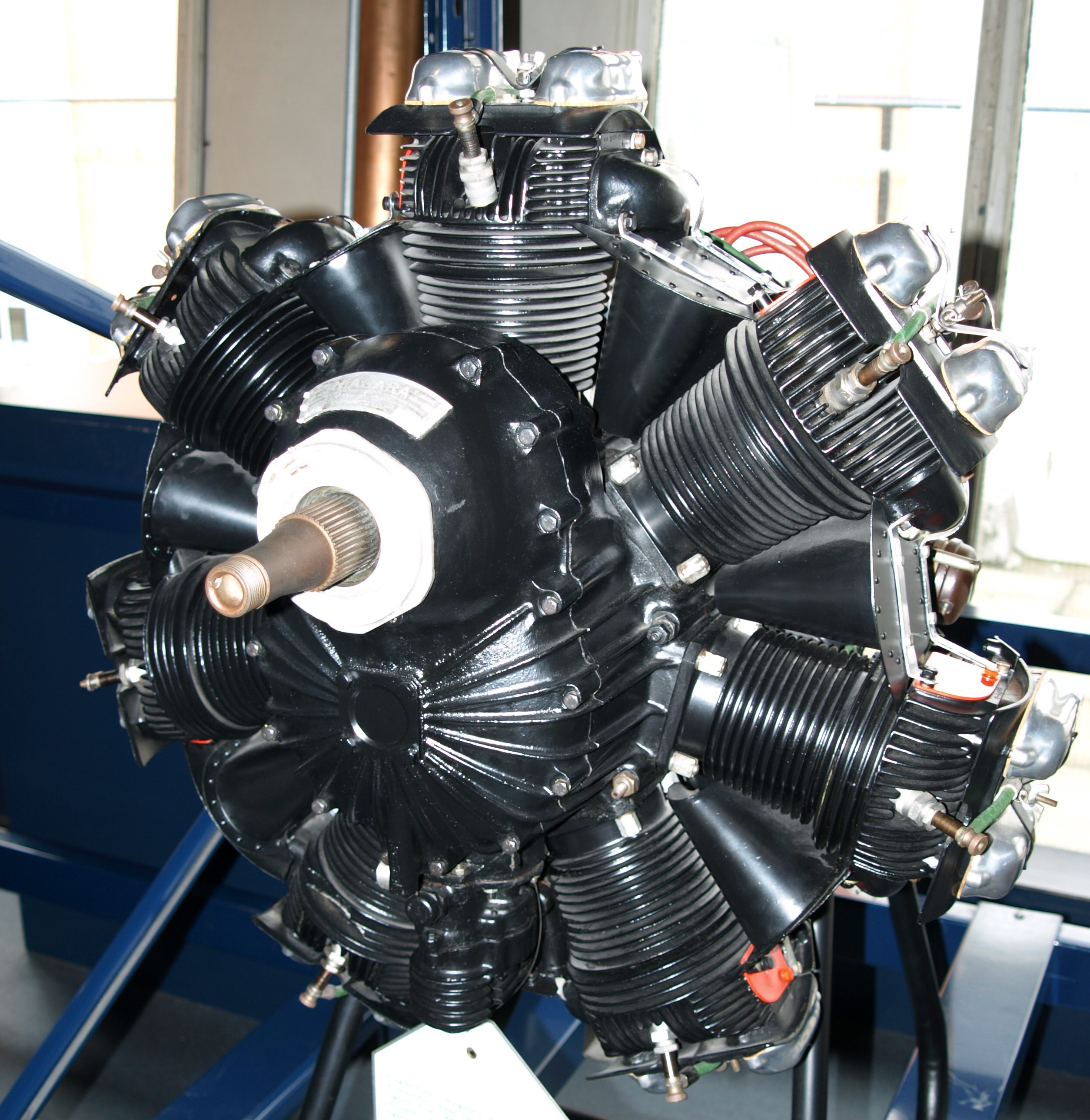
- Pobjoy Niagara on display at the Science Museum, London
- Type: Piston radial aero engine
- Manufacturer: Pobjoy Airmotors
- First run: 1934

The Pobjoy Niagara is a British seven-cylinder, air-cooled, radial, aero engine first produced in 1934. The design ran at higher speeds than conventional engines, and used reduction gearing to lower the speed of the propeller. This led to a noticeable off-centre mounting for the propeller. The Niagara was a popular engine for light and experimental aircraft, well regarded due to its small diameter, smooth operation, low noise and innovative engineering.

== Variants ==
Niagara I
Bore/stroke 77 × 87 mm (3.03 × 3.43 in), swept volume 2,835 cc (173.0 cu in). Compression 6.25:1, gearing 0.47:1. Normal continuous power 84 hp (63 kW) at 3,200 rpm at sea level.

Niagara II
Bore/stroke 77 × 87 mm (3.03 × 3.43 in), swept volume 2,835 cc (173.0 cu in). Compression 6.0:1, gearing 0.39:1. Normal continuous power 84 hp (63 kW) at 3,200 rpm at sea level.

Niagara III
Bore/stroke 77 × 87 mm (3.03 × 3.43 in), swept volume 2,835 cc (173.0 cu in). Gearing 0.47:1. Normal continuous power 88 hp (66 kW) at 3,300 rpm at sea level.

Niagara IV
Similar to Niagara III but with a higher operating rpm. Normal continuous power 98 hp (73 kW) at 3,500 rpm at sea level.

Niagara V
Larger version of the basic Niagara. Bore/stroke 81 × 87 mm (3.19 × 3.43 in), swept volume 3,138 cc (191.5 cu in). Compression 8.0:1, gearing 0.47:1. Normal continuous power 125 hp (93 kW) at 4,000 rpm at sea level.

Cataract I-III
De-rated, uncowled versions of Niagara I-III with simple inter-cylinder baffles for cooling and trickle-down lubrication for lower exhaust rockers. Compression 5.7:1, gearing 0.47:1.

Cascade
Direct drive version of Cataract I. Normal continuous power 66 hp (49 kW) at 2,100 rpm.

== Applications ==
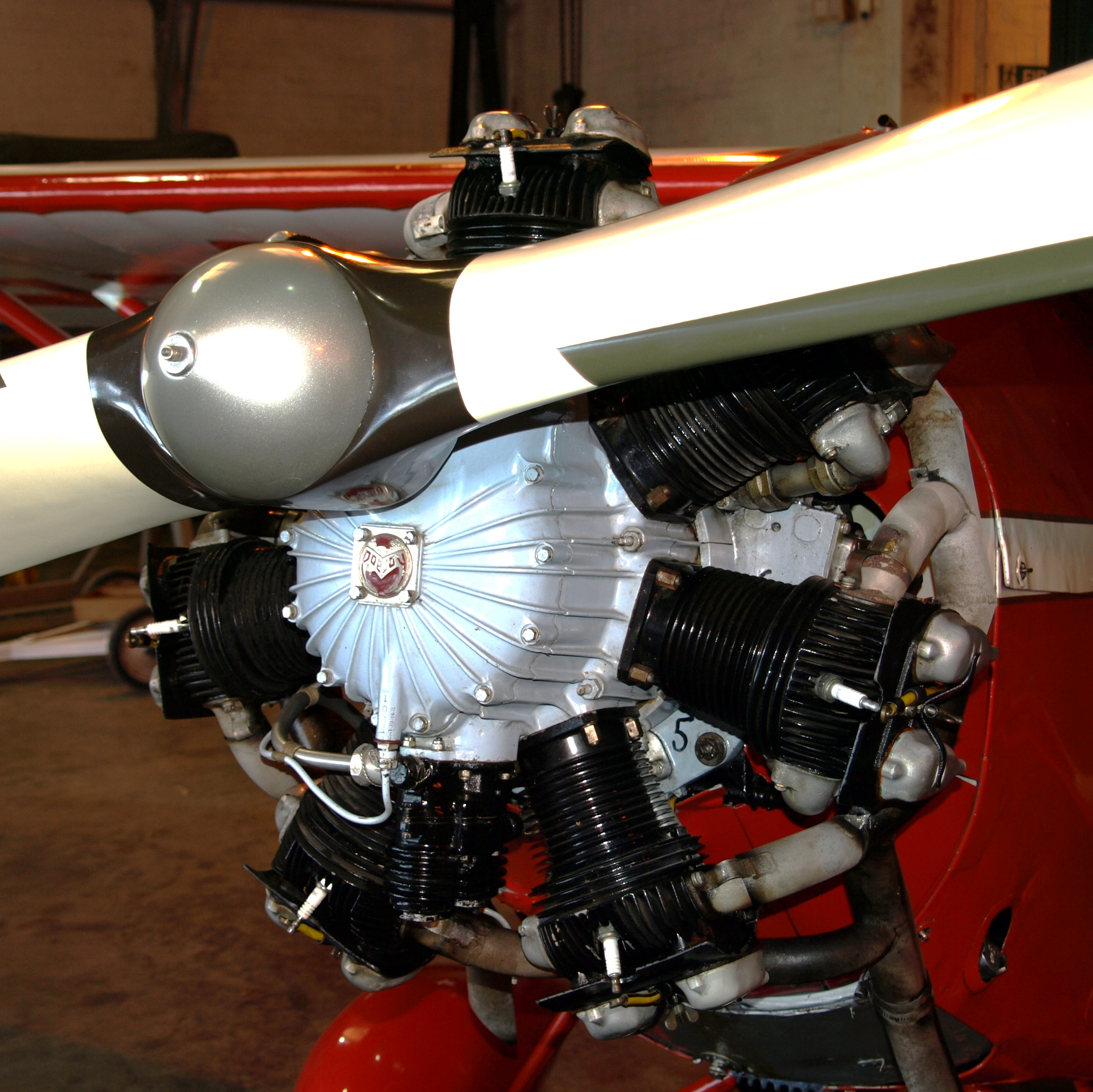
Airworthy Pobjoy Niagara installed in a Comper Swift at the Shuttleworth Collection

=== Niagara ===
- Aeroput MMS-3
- Airspeed Fleet Shadower
- CLW Curlew
- Comper Kite
- Comper Swift
- General Aircraft Monospar ST-25
- General Aircraft Fleet Shadower
- Gribovsky G-25
- Lambach HL.I
- Moss M.A.1
- Pobjoy Pirate
- Saro Shrimp
- Shapley Kittiwake
- Short Scion Senior
- Short Scion
- Short S.31 (half-scale Stirling)
- Spartan Clipper
- Westland CL.20

=== Cataract ===
- British Klemm Swallow
- Hafner A.R.III Gyroplane
- Hendy Hobo
- Pitcairn PA-22

=== Cascade ===
- Autogiro AC-35

== Surviving engines ==
A Pobjoy Niagara-powered Comper Swift G-ACTF that is owned and operated by The Shuttleworth Collection, Old Warden remains airworthy in 2017 and displays to the public at home airshows during the flying season.

== Engines on display ==
A preserved Pobjoy Niagara engine is on public display at the Science Museum, London and one is also held at the Museum of Transport and Technology (New Zealand).

== Specifications (Pobjoy Niagara IV) ==
Data from Lumsden.

=== General characteristics ===
- Type: 7-cylinder, air-cooled, radial engine
- Bore: 3.03 in (77 mm)
- Stroke: 3.43 in (87 mm)
- Displacement: 173 cu in (2.8 L)
- Diameter: 26.5 in (670 mm)
- Dry weight: 130 lb (59 kg)

=== Components ===
- Valvetrain: 1 inlet and 1 exhaust valve per cylinder
- Fuel system: 1 Claudel-Hobson carburettor
- Fuel type: 70 octane
- Cooling system: Air-cooled

=== Performance ===
- Power output: 98 hp (73 kW) at 3,625 rpm maximum at sea level
- Compression ratio: 6:1
- Power-to-weight ratio: 0.75 hp/lb

== See also ==
Related development

- Pobjoy R

Comparable engines

- Rotec R2800
- Warner Scarab

Related lists

- List of aircraft engines
