= General Aircraft Fleet Shadower =

G.A.L.38 Fleet Shadower
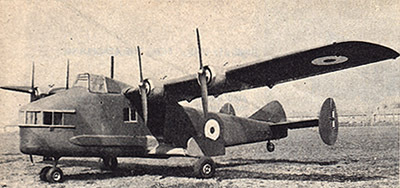

General information
- Type: Carrier-based fleet shadower
- Manufacturer: General Aircraft Ltd
- Primary user: Fleet Air Arm
- Number built: 1

History
- First flight: 13 May 1940
- Retired: 1941

The General Aircraft G.A.L.38 Fleet Shadower was a British long-range patrol aircraft design of the immediate pre-Second World War period. The Fleet Shadower was a highly specialised aircraft intended to follow enemy naval forces over long periods of time and radio back position information. However, the concept produced an ungainly and ultimately unsuccessful type. The Airspeed Fleet Shadower, built to the same requirement and of broadly similar appearance, also did not progress past the prototype stage.

== Design and development ==
The G.A.L.38 Fleet Shadower and the Airspeed A.S.39 Fleet Shadower were produced to meet Specification S.23/37, which came from the Royal Navy's "Operational Requirement OR.52" for an aircraft which could shadow enemy fleets at night. Initially, three other companies were also involved: Percival, Short Brothers and Fairey Aviation. Following evaluation of the designs General Aircraft and Airspeed were contracted to build two prototypes each, General Aircraft's contract being dated 15 November 1938.

The required performance was a speed of 38 knots (70 km/h) at 1,500 feet (460 m) for not less than six hours. The design would also have to be able to operate from an aircraft carrier and hence have a folding wing for easier deck storage. It would have to give good views for the observer and be quiet at cruising speed.

The G.A.L.38 and the A.S.39 designs were similar – both high-wing aircraft with fixed landing gear using four small Pobjoy Niagara V engines spread across the wings to generate lift at low speed. There was an observer's position in a glazed compartment in the nose and a radio operator's station in the fuselage behind the pilot's cockpit.

The aircraft was fitted with various devices to increase lift; slotted flaps and slotted ailerons and, on the low wing sponsons, split flaps. The wings folded back, pivoted close to the fuselage, on hydraulic power.

Due to development problems at Pobjoy with the Niagara V, it was decided to use the lower-powered Niagara III civil version. The first G.A.L.38 Fleet Shadower (also known as the "Night Shadower") flew on 13 May 1940 with the Niagara III engines. An innovative use of the "propwash" generated by propellers directed over the full-span flaps led to an impressive minimum speed of 39 mph (63 km/h) which would have allowed the Fleet Shadower to cruise above an enemy fleet. During testing the aircraft suffered from stability problems, but not as bad as those of the Airspeed design, which was cancelled in February 1941. The aircraft had major modification before flying again in June 1941 with the Niagara V engines; the three tail fins had been replaced by a single large fin. With the incomplete second G.A.L.38 being used as a spares source, test flying continued until September 1941. In October 1941 the company was instructed to scrap the second aircraft, and in March 1942 instructions were issued to scrap the prototype as well.

The concept of a fleet patrol aircraft was superseded by the wartime development of effective Air to Surface (ASV) radar which could be fitted in long-range patrol aircraft such as the Consolidated Liberator I. In February 1941, the Royal Navy cancelled the project.

== Specifications ==
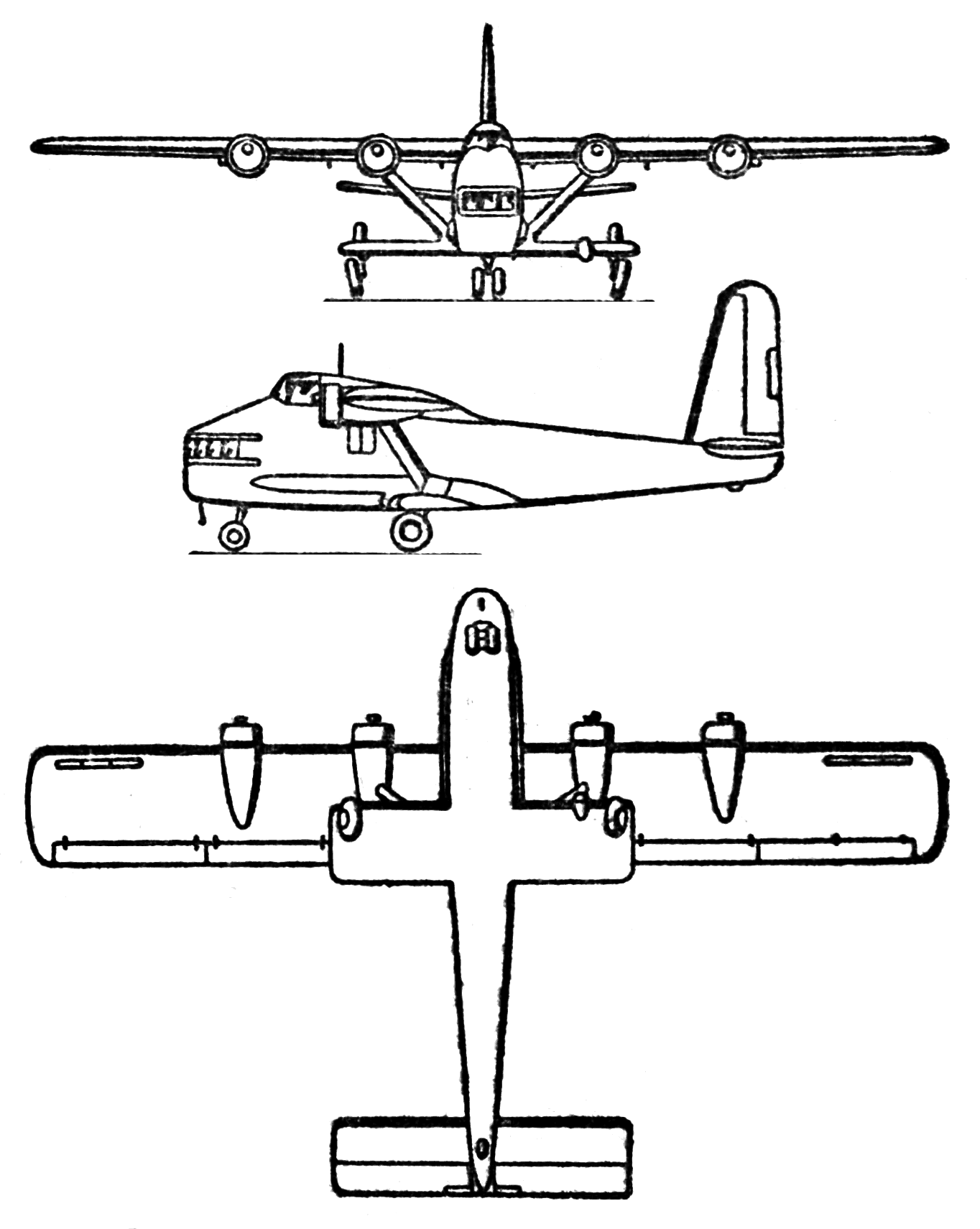
General Aircraft GAL-38 Fleet Shadower 3-view drawing from Les Ailes January 25, 1947

Data from Jane's Fighting Aircraft of World War II

General characteristics

- Crew: 3 (pilot, observer, radio operator)
- Length: 36 ft 1 in (11.00 m)
- Wingspan: 55 ft 10 in (17.02 m)
- Width: 17 ft 11 in (5.46 m) folded
- Height: 12 ft 8 in (3.86 m)
- Wing area: 472 sq ft (43.9 m^{2})
- Empty weight: 6,153 lb (2,791 kg)
- Gross weight: 8,591 lb (3,897 kg)
- Max takeoff weight: 9,458 lb (4,290 kg)
- Powerplant: 4 × Pobjoy Niagara V 7-cylinder air-cooled geared radial piston engine, 130 hp (97 kW) each
- Propellers: 2-bladed fixed-pitch wooden propellers

Performance

- Maximum speed: 115 mph (185 km/h, 100 kn) at sea level
- Cruise speed: 94 mph (151 km/h, 82 kn)
- Landing speed: 73 mph (63 kn; 117 km/h)
- Minimum speed: 39 mph (34 kn; 63 km/h)
- Range: 990 mi (1,590 km, 860 nmi)
- Endurance: 11 hours
- Service ceiling: 6,000 ft (1,800 m)
- Rate of climb: 390 ft/min (2.0 m/s)
- Wing loading: 20 lb/sq ft (98 kg/m^{2})

== See also ==
Aircraft of comparable role, configuration, and era

- Airspeed Fleet Shadower

Related lists

- List of aircraft of the Fleet Air Arm
- List of carrier-based aircraft
