= Airspeed Fleet Shadower =

Proposed long-range patrol aircraft

AS.39 Fleet Shadower
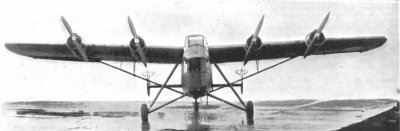

General information
- Type: carrier-based maritime reconnaissance aircraft
- Manufacturer: Airspeed Ltd
- Number built: 1

History
- First flight: 17 October 1940
- Retired: 1941

The Airspeed AS.39 Fleet Shadower was a British long-range patrol aircraft design that did not go beyond the prototype stage. A prototype of similar aircraft, the General Aircraft Fleet Shadower, was also built. While the concept of a fleet shadower had some promise, the resulting designs were soon overtaken by wartime developments in airborne radar.

== Design and development ==
The Royal Navy envisaged a need (Operational Requirement OR.52) for an aircraft that could shadow enemy fleets at night, and the resulting Specification S.23/37 called for a slow-flying low-noise aircraft with a long range capable of operating from an aircraft carrier. The specified performance was a speed of 38 knots (70 km/h) at 1,500 ft (460 m) for not less than six hours.

Five companies showed interest: Percival, Short Brothers, Fairey Aviation, General Aircraft Ltd and Airspeed.

General Aircraft submitted the G.A.L.38, of very similar general design to the AS.39. General Aircraft and Airspeed were selected to build two prototypes each and Airspeed received a contract on 10 August 1938.

The AS.39 was a high-wing, semi-cantilever, strut-braced (on the outer panels) monoplane with wooden wings and tail unit and an all-metal monocoque fuselage. It had a fixed, divided type landing gear and tailwheel. It had a crew of three: pilot, observer and radio operator. The observer was accommodated in the nose with windows on three sides and the pilot's compartment was raised to allow passage to the radio operator's compartment. Four 130 hp (97 kW) Pobjoy Niagara V seven-cylinder air-cooled radial engines were mounted on the wings. This maximized propwash over the wing giving extra lift at low speed. The wings could be folded for storage when used on an aircraft carrier.

== Operational history ==
Of the two prototypes started, only one was completed, making its first flight on 17 October 1940; the first flight was delayed due to vibration problems with the Niagara V engines. The prototype had stability problems and poor stall handling, not helped by the low power of the engines. Airspeed was asked to re-engine the aircraft with two Armstrong Whitworth Cheetah XI radial engines and add rear-facing machine guns but the second aircraft was not complete when, on 17 February 1941, the Navy cancelled the Fleet Shadower programme along with the AS.39, the company was asked to scrap both aircraft. The competing G.A.L.38 flew for a few months before it too was cancelled, and scrapped in March 1942. The requirement for such aircraft had been made obsolete due to the introduction of radar on long-range patrol aircraft such as the Liberator I.

== Specifications (AS.39) ==
Data from Nothing ventured...Airspeed AS.39 Night Shadower

General characteristics

- Crew: 3 (Pilot, observer, radio operator)
- Length: 39 ft 10 in (12.14 m)
- Wingspan: 55 ft 4 in (16.87 m)
- Height: 10 ft 5 in (3.18 m)
- Wing area: 469 sq ft (43.6 m^{2})
- Empty weight: 4,592 lb (2,083 kg)
- Gross weight: 6,935 lb (3,146 kg)
- Powerplant: 4 × Pobjoy Niagara V 7-cylinder air-cooled radial piston engines, 140 hp (100 kW) each

Performance

- Maximum speed: 126 mph (203 km/h, 109 kn) at 5,000 ft (1,500 m)
- Cruise speed: 113 mph (182 km/h, 98 kn) at 5,000 ft (1,500 m)
- Stall speed: 33 mph (53 km/h, 29 kn)
- Endurance: 6 hours
- Service ceiling: 14,700 ft (4,500 m)
- Absolute ceiling: 16,700 ft (5,100 m)
- Rate of climb: 865 ft/min (4.4 m/s)
- Time to altitude: 10,000 ft (3,000 m) in 18 minutes

== See also ==
Aircraft of comparable role, configuration, and era

- General Aircraft Fleet Shadower
